= 2013 PTT Pattaya Open =

- Date: 28 January – 3 February
- Edition: 22nd
- Category: WTA International tournaments
- Draw: 32S / 16D
- Prize money: $235,000
- Surface: Hard - outdoor
- Location: Pattaya, Thailand

Champions

Singles
- (Russia) Maria Kirilenko

Doubles
- (Japan) Kimiko Date-Krumm / (Australia) Casey Dellacqua
← 2012 ·	PTT Pattaya Open	· 2014 →

The 2013 PTT Pattaya Open was a women's professional tennis tournament played on outdoor hard courts. It was the 22nd edition of the PTT Pattaya Open and was part of the International category on the 2013 WTA Tour. It took place at the Dusit Thani Hotel in Pattaya, Thailand from January 26 through February 3, 2013. Second-seeded Maria Kirilenko won the singles title.

== Finals ==
=== Singles ===
- (Russia) Maria Kirilenko defeated (Germany) Sabine Lisicki, 5–7, 6–1, 7–6^{(7–1)}

=== Doubles ===
- (Japan) Kimiko Date-Krumm / (Australia) Casey Dellacqua defeated (Uzbekistan) Akgul Amanmuradova / (Russia) Alexandra Panova, 6–3, 6–2

== Singles main-draw entrants ==
=== Seeds ===
Country	Player	Ranking^{1}	Seed
SRB	Ana Ivanovic	13	1
RUS	Maria Kirilenko	15	2
TPE	Hsieh Su-wei	27	3
ROU	Sorana Cîrstea	29	4
GER	Sabine Lisicki	36	5
SVK	Daniela Hantuchová	44	6
RUS	Elena Vesnina	47	7
GBR	Heather Watson	50	8

- ^{1} Rankings as of January 14, 2013

=== Other entrants ===
The following players received wildcards into the main draw:

- (Slovakia) Daniela Hantuchová
- (Thailand) Luksika Kumkhum
- (Thailand) Varatchaya Wongteanchai

The following players received entry from the qualifying draw:

- (Uzbekistan) Akgul Amanmuradova
- (United States) Bethanie Mattek-Sands
- (Australia) Anastasia Rodionova
- (Latvia) Anastasija Sevastova

=== Withdrawals ===
Before the tournament

- (Slovenia) Polona Hercog
- (Switzerland) Romina Oprandi
- (United Kingdom) Laura Robson
- (Russia) Vera Zvonareva

=== Retirements ===
- (Hungary) Tímea Babos (gastrointestinal illness)
- (Romania) Irina-Camelia Begu (right shoulder injury)
- (Slovakia) Daniela Hantuchová (dizziness)

== Doubles main-draw entrants ==
=== Seeds ===
Country	Player	Country	Player	Rank^{1}	Seed
TPE	Chang Kai-chen	USA	Vania King	90	1
NZL	Marina Erakovic	GBR	Heather Watson	108	2
TPE	Chan Hao-ching	TPE	Chan Yung-jan	110	3
USA	Bethanie Mattek-Sands	ISR	Shahar Pe'er	114	4

- ^{1} Rankings are as of January 14, 2013

=== Other entrants ===
The following pairs received wildcards into the main draw:

- (Thailand) Noppawan Lertcheewakarn / (Kyrgyzstan) Ksenia Palkina
- (Thailand) Nicha Lertpitaksinchai / (Thailand) Peangtarn Plipuech

The following pair received entry as alternates:

- (Thailand) Varatchaya Wongteanchai / (Thailand) Varunya Wongteanchai

=== Withdrawals ===
Before the tournament

- (China) Zheng Saisai (personal reasons)

During the tournament

- (Hungary) Tímea Babos (gastrointestinal illness)
