= 2014 PTT Pattaya Open =

- Date: 27 January – 2 February
- Edition: 23rd
- Category: WTA International tournaments
- Draw: 32S / 16D
- Prize money: $250,000
- Surface: Hard - outdoor
- Location: Pattaya, Thailand

Champions

Singles
- (Russia) Ekaterina Makarova

Doubles
- (China) Peng Shuai / (China) Zhang Shuai
← 2013 ·	PTT Pattaya Open	· 2015 →

The 2014 PTT Pattaya Open was a women's professional tennis tournament played on outdoor hard courts. It was the 23rd edition of the PTT Pattaya Open and was part of the International category on the 2014 WTA Tour. It took place at the Dusit Thani Hotel in Pattaya, Thailand from January 27 through February 2, 2014. Fourth-seeded Ekaterina Makarova won the singles title.

== Finals ==
=== Singles ===
- (Russia) Ekaterina Makarova defeated (Czech Republic) Karolína Plíšková 6–3, 7–6^{(9–7)}

=== Doubles ===
- (China) Peng Shuai / (China) Zhang Shuai defeated (Russia) Alla Kudryavtseva / (Australia) Anastasia Rodionova 3–6, 7-6^{(7-5)}, [10-6]

== Points and prize money ==
=== Point distribution ===
Event	W	F	SF	QF	Round of 16	Round of 32	Q	Q2	Q1
Singles	280	180	110	60	30	1	18	12	1
Doubles	280	180	110	60	1	—	—	—	—

=== Prize money ===
Event	W	F	SF	QF	Round of 16	Round of 32^{1}	Q2	Q1
Singles	$43,000	$21,400	$11,500	$6,200	$3,420	$2,200	$1,285	$750
Doubles *	$12,300	$6,400	$3,435	$1,820	$960	—	—	—

_{^{1} Qualifiers prize money is also the Round of 32 prize money}
_{* per team}

== Singles main-draw entrants ==
=== Seeds ===
Country	Player	Ranking^{1}	Seed
GER	Sabine Lisicki	15	1
RUS	Svetlana Kuznetsova	20	2
ROU	Sorana Cîrstea	21	3
RUS	Ekaterina Makarova	22	4
RUS	Elena Vesnina	28	5
ESP	Garbiñe Muguruza	38	6
USA	Bethanie Mattek-Sands	41	7
CHN	Peng Shuai	43	8

- ^{1} Rankings as of January 13, 2014

=== Other entrants ===
The following players received wildcards into the main draw:

- (Russia) Svetlana Kuznetsova
- (Thailand) Nicha Lertpitaksinchai
- (Thailand) Peangtarn Plipuech
- (Russia) Vera Zvonareva

The following players received entry from the qualifying draw:

- (Romania) Alexandra Dulgheru
- (Serbia) Aleksandra Krunić
- (Russia) Alla Kudryavtseva
- (Ukraine) Olga Savchuk

=== Withdrawals ===
Before the tournament

- (Japan) Misaki Doi → replaced by (Slovenia) Tadeja Majerič
- (United States) Varvara Lepchenko → replaced by (Spain) Anabel Medina Garrigues
- (Japan) Ayumi Morita → replaced by (Spain) Estrella Cabeza Candela
- (Japan) Kurumi Nara → replaced by (Kazakhstan) Yulia Putintseva

During the tournament

- (Russia) Svetlana Kuznetsova (left hip injury)
- (Germany) Sabine Lisicki (right shoulder injury)

== Doubles main-draw entrants ==
=== Seeds ===
Country	Player	Country	Player	Rank^{1}	Seed
RUS	Ekaterina Makarova	RUS	Elena Vesnina	11	1
CZE	Andrea Hlaváčková	ESP	Anabel Medina Garrigues	42	2
RUS	Alla Kudryavtseva	AUS	Anastasia Rodionova	48	3
CHN	Peng Shuai	CHN	Zhang Shuai	51	4

- ^{1} Rankings are as of January 13, 2014

=== Other entrants ===
The following pairs received wildcards into the main draw:

- (Thailand) Noppawan Lertcheewakarn / (Russia) Vera Zvonareva
- (Thailand) Varatchaya Wongteanchai / (Thailand) Varunya Wongteanchai
