= 2012 PTT Pattaya Open – Doubles =

Doubles
- 2012 PTT Pattaya Open

Final
- Champions: (India) Sania Mirza (Australia) Anastasia Rodionova
- Runners-up: (Chinese Taipei) Chan Hao-ching (Chinese Taipei) Chan Yung-jan
- Score: 3–6, 6–1, [10–8]

Details
- Draw: 16
- Seeds: 4

Events
Singles	Doubles
← 2011 ·	PTT Pattaya Open	· 2013 →

Sara Errani and Roberta Vinci were the defending champions, but chose not to participate.
Sania Mirza and Anastasia Rodionova won the title after defeating Chan Hao-ching and Chan Yung-jan 3–6, 6–1, [10–8] in the final.

== Seeds ==
1. (India) Sania Mirza / (Australia) Anastasia Rodionova (champions)
2. (Greece) Eleni Daniilidou/ (Thailand) Tamarine Tanasugarn (semifinals, retired)
3. (Uzbekistan) Akgul Amanmuradova/ (Japan) Kimiko Date-Krumm (semifinals)
4. (Chinese Taipei) Chan Hao-ching / (Chinese Taipei) Chan Yung-jan (final)

== Draw ==
=== Key ===
- Q = Qualifier
- WC = Wild card
- LL = Lucky loser
- Alt = Alternate
- SE = Special exempt
- PR = Protected ranking
- ITF = ITF entry
- JE = Junior exempt
- w/o = Walkover
- r = Retired
- d = Defaulted
- SR = Special ranking

=== Draw ===
First round
1	(India) S Mirza (Australia) A Rodionova	6	6
(France) I Brémond (France) C Garcia	0	2
(Slovakia) D Cibulková (Slovakia) J Husárová	2	3
(Thailand) Vara Wongteanchai (Thailand) Varu Wongteanchai	6	6
3	(Uzbekistan) A Amanmuradova (Japan) K Date-Krumm	3	7^{7}	[10]
(Slovenia) A Klepač (Russia) A Pivovarova	6	6^{1}	[4]
(Thailand) N Lertcheewakarn (Japan) E Sema	6	6
(Uzbekistan) N Abduraimova (Turkey) Ç Büyükakçay	2	1
(Chinese Taipei) K-c Chang (United States) V King
(Romania) S Cîrstea (United Kingdom) A Keothavong	w/o
(Chinese Taipei) C-w Chan (Australia) D Jeflea	6	4	[5]
4	(Chinese Taipei) H-c Chan (Chinese Taipei) Y-j Chan	4	6	[10]
(Chinese Taipei) W-h Hsu (United Kingdom) E Webley-Smith	6	2	[9]
(Japan) S Akita (Austria) N Rottmann	3	6	[11]
(Japan) M Doi (China) Y Zhou	3	2
2	(Greece) E Daniilidou (Thailand) T Tanasugarn	6	6

Quarterfinals
1	(India) S Mirza (Australia) A Rodionova	6	6
(Thailand) Vara Wongteanchai (Thailand) Varu Wongteanchai	4	3
3	(Uzbekistan) A Amanmuradova (Japan) K Date-Krumm	7^{7}	6
(Thailand) N Lertcheewakarn (Japan) E Sema	6^{4}	1
(Romania) S Cîrstea (United Kingdom) A Keothavong
4	(Chinese Taipei) H-c Chan (Chinese Taipei) Y-j Chan	w/o
(Japan) S Akita (Austria) N Rottmann	2	0
2	(Greece) E Daniilidou (Thailand) T Tanasugarn	6	6

Semifinals
1	(India) S Mirza (Australia) A Rodionova	6	6
3	(Uzbekistan) A Amanmuradova (Japan) K Date-Krumm	4	4
4	(Chinese Taipei) H-c Chan (Chinese Taipei) Y-j Chan	w/o
2	(Greece) E Daniilidou (Thailand) T Tanasugarn

Final
1	(India) S Mirza (Australia) A Rodionova	3	6	[10]
4	(Chinese Taipei) H-c Chan (Chinese Taipei) Y-j Chan	6	1	[8]
