= 2011 PTT Pattaya Open – Singles =

Singles
- 2011 PTT Pattaya Open

Final
- Champion: (Slovakia) Daniela Hantuchová
- Runner-up: (Italy) Sara Errani
- Score: 6–0, 6–2

Details
- Draw: 32
- Seeds: 8

Events
Singles	Doubles
← 2010 ·	PTT Pattaya Open	· 2012 →

Vera Zvonareva was the two-time defending champion, but lost to Daniela Hantuchová in the semifinals.
Daniela Hantuchová won the title, defeating Sara Errani 6-0, 6-2 in the final.

== Seeds ==
1. (Russia) Vera Zvonareva (semifinals)
2. (Serbia) Ana Ivanovic (quarterfinals)
3. (Russia) Maria Kirilenko (second round)
4. (Slovakia) Daniela Hantuchová (champion)
5. (Italy) Roberta Vinci (semifinals)
6. (China) Peng Shuai (quarterfinals)
7. (China) Zheng Jie (first round)
8. (Italy) Sara Errani (final)

== Draw ==
=== Key ===
- Q = Qualifier
- WC = Wild card
- LL = Lucky loser
- Alt = Alternate
- SE = Special exempt
- PR = Protected ranking
- ITF = ITF entry
- JE = Junior exempt
- w/o = Walkover
- r = Retired
- d = Defaulted
- SR = Special ranking

=== Finals ===
Semifinals
1	(Russia) Vera Zvonareva	6^{3}	4
4	(Slovakia) Daniela Hantuchová	7	6
8	(Italy) Sara Errani	6	6
5	(Italy) Roberta Vinci	1	4

Final
4	(Slovakia) Daniela Hantuchová	6	6
8	(Italy) Sara Errani	0	2

=== Top half ===
First round
1	(Russia) V Zvonareva	6	6
(Austria) T Paszek	4	2
Q	(Kazakhstan) Z Diyas	4	4
Q	(Thailand) N Wannasuk	6	6
(United Kingdom) E Baltacha	6	6
WC	(Thailand) N Lertpitaksinchai	2	3
(Chinese Taipei) Y-j Chan	6^{8}	0
6	(China) S Peng	7	6
4	(Slovakia) D Hantuchová	6	6
(Japan) K Nara	2	1
(Japan) K Date-Krumm	6	6
(Czech Republic) R Voráčová	2	2
(Germany) T Malek	6^{4}	2
(South Africa) C Scheepers	7	6
(Uzbekistan) A Amanmuradova	6	7
7	(China) J Zheng	4	6^{6}

Second round
1	(Russia) V Zvonareva	6	7
Q	(Thailand) N Wannasuk	1	5
(United Kingdom) E Baltacha	6	1	4
6	(China) S Peng	2	6	6
4	(Slovakia) D Hantuchová	7	6
(Japan) K Date-Krumm	6^{3}	3
(South Africa) C Scheepers	2	4
(Uzbekistan) A Amanmuradova	6	6

Quarterfinals
1	(Russia) V Zvonareva	6	4	6
6	(China) S Peng	4	6	4
4	(Slovakia) D Hantuchová	6	6
(Uzbekistan) A Amanmuradova	2	0

Semifinals
1	(Russia) V Zvonareva	6^{3}	4
4	(Slovakia) D Hantuchová	7	6

=== Bottom half ===
First round
8	(Italy) S Errani	4	6	6
(Chinese Taipei) K-c Chang	6	2	4
(Thailand) T Tanasugarn	3	2
(Japan) A Morita	6	6
(Italy) R Oprandi	6	3	5
Q	(Kazakhstan) G Voskoboeva	4	6	7
(Italy) A Brianti	0	6	2
3	(Russia) M Kirilenko	6	4	6
5	(Italy) R Vinci	6	6
Q	(Kyrgyzstan) K Palkina	1	3
(Slovakia) Z Kučová	4	2
(China) S Zhang	6	6
WC	(Thailand) N Lertcheewakarn	3	3
(United States) J Craybas	6	6
WC	(Thailand) N Luangnam	0	2
2	(Serbia) A Ivanovic	6	6

Second round
8	(Italy) S Errani	2	7	6
(Japan) A Morita	6	5	2
Q	(Kazakhstan) G Voskoboeva	1	7	6
3	(Russia) M Kirilenko	6	5	4
5	(Italy) R Vinci	7	6
(China) S Zhang	5	1
(United States) J Craybas	6	1	5
2	(Serbia) A Ivanovic	4	6	7

Quarterfinals
8	(Italy) S Errani	2	6	6
Q	(Kazakhstan) G Voskoboeva	6	3	2
5	(Italy) R Vinci	7	6
2	(Serbia) A Ivanovic	5	3

Semifinals
8	(Italy) S Errani	6	6
5	(Italy) R Vinci	1	4
