= 2013 PTT Pattaya Open – Doubles =

Doubles
- 2013 PTT Pattaya Open

Final
- Champions: (Japan) Kimiko Date-Krumm (Australia) Casey Dellacqua
- Runners-up: (Uzbekistan) Akgul Amanmuradova (Russia) Alexandra Panova
- Score: 6–3, 6–2

Details
- Draw: 16
- Seeds: 4

Events
Singles	Doubles
← 2012 ·	PTT Pattaya Open	· 2014 →

Sania Mirza and Anastasia Rodionova were the defending champions but decided not to participate.
Kimiko Date-Krumm and Casey Dellacqua won the final against Akgul Amanmuradova and Alexandra Panova with the score 6–3, 6–2.

== Seeds ==
1. (Chinese Taipei) Chang Kai-chen / (United States) Vania King (quarterfinals)
2. (New Zealand) Marina Erakovic / (United Kingdom) Heather Watson (first round)
3. (Chinese Taipei) Chan Hao-ching / (Chinese Taipei) Chan Yung-jan (first round)
4. (United States) Bethanie Mattek-Sands / (Israel) Shahar Pe'er (semifinals)

== Draw ==
=== Key ===
- Q = Qualifier
- WC = Wild card
- LL = Lucky loser
- Alt = Alternate
- SE = Special exempt
- PR = Protected ranking
- ITF = ITF entry
- JE = Junior exempt
- w/o = Walkover
- r = Retired
- d = Defaulted
- SR = Special ranking

=== Draw ===
First round
1	(Chinese Taipei) K-c Chang (United States) V King	7^{7}	6
WC	(Thailand) N Lertpitaksinchai (Thailand) Pe Plipuech	6^{3}	3
(Romania) S Cîrstea (Slovakia) D Hantuchová	6	2	[10]
(Japan) K Date-Krumm (Australia) C Dellacqua	4	6	[12]
4	(United States) B Mattek-Sands (Israel) S Pe'er	6	6
(Chinese Taipei) S-y Hsieh (China) W Liu	4	1
(Russia) N Bratchikova (Slovenia) A Klepač	6	3	[10]
(China) X Han (Japan) M Miyamura	4	6	[5]
WC	(Thailand) N Lertcheewakarn (Kyrgyzstan) K Palkina	4	1
(Ukraine) I Buryachok (Russia) V Solovyeva	6	6
Alt	(Thailand) Vara Wongteanchai (Thailand) Varu Wongteanchai	6	3	[10]
3	(Chinese Taipei) H-c Chan (Chinese Taipei) Y-j Chan	4	6	[7]
(Hungary) T Babos (Greece) E Daniilidou	6	7
(Germany) T Malek (South Africa) C Scheepers	4	5
(Uzbekistan) A Amanmuradova (Russia) A Panova	6	1	[10]
2	(New Zealand) M Erakovic (United Kingdom) H Watson	2	6	[1]

Quarterfinals
1	(Chinese Taipei) K-c Chang (United States) V King	3	3
(Japan) K Date-Krumm (Australia) C Dellacqua	6	6
4	(United States) B Mattek-Sands (Israel) S Pe'er	6	6
(Russia) N Bratchikova (Slovenia) A Klepač	3	3
(Ukraine) I Buryachok (Russia) V Solovyeva	1	1
Alt	(Thailand) Vara Wongteanchai (Thailand) Varu Wongteanchai	6	6
(Hungary) T Babos (Greece) E Daniilidou
(Uzbekistan) A Amanmuradova (Russia) A Panova	w/o

Semifinals
(Japan) K Date-Krumm (Australia) C Dellacqua	6	7^{7}
4	(United States) B Mattek-Sands (Israel) S Pe'er	3	6^{4}
Alt	(Thailand) Vara Wongteanchai (Thailand) Varu Wongteanchai	3	2
(Uzbekistan) A Amanmuradova (Russia) A Panova	6	6

Final
(Japan) K Date-Krumm (Australia) C Dellacqua	6	6
(Uzbekistan) A Amanmuradova (Russia) A Panova	3	2
