= 2014 PTT Pattaya Open – Singles =

Singles
- 2014 PTT Pattaya Open

Final
- Champion: (Russia) Ekaterina Makarova
- Runner-up: (Czech Republic) Karolína Plíšková
- Score: 6–3, 7–6^{(9–7)}

Details
- Draw: 32
- Seeds: 8

Events
Singles	Doubles
← 2013 ·	PTT Pattaya Open	· 2015 →

Maria Kirilenko was the defending champion, but decided not to participate.
Ekaterina Makarova won the title, defeating Karolína Plíšková in the final, 6–3, 7–6^{(9–7)}.

== Seeds ==
1. (Germany) Sabine Lisicki (second round, withdrew because of a right shoulder injury)
2. (Russia) Svetlana Kuznetsova (second round, withdrew because of a left hip injury)
3. (Romania) Sorana Cîrstea (quarterfinals)
4. (Russia) Ekaterina Makarova (champion)
5. (Russia) Elena Vesnina (quarterfinals)
6. (Spain) Garbiñe Muguruza (first round)
7. (United States) Bethanie Mattek-Sands (first round)
8. (China) Peng Shuai (quarterfinals)

== Draw ==
=== Key ===
- Q = Qualifier
- WC = Wild card
- LL = Lucky loser
- Alt = Alternate
- ITF = ITF entry
- PR = Protected ranking
- SR = Special ranking
- SE = Special exempt
- JE = Junior exempt
- JR = Junior Accelerator Programme entrant
- CO = College Accelerator Programme entrant
- NG = Next Gen Accelerator Program entrant
- w/o = Walkover
- r = Retired
- d = Defaulted

=== Finals ===
Semifinals
(Czech Republic) Andrea Hlaváčková	3	6	4
4	(Russia) Ekaterina Makarova	6	0	6
(Czech Republic) Karolína Plíšková	6	4	6
(Germany) Julia Görges	3	6	3

Final
4	(Russia) Ekaterina Makarova	6	7^{9}
(Czech Republic) Karolína Plíšková	3	6^{7}

=== Top half ===
First round
1	(Germany) S Lisicki	7	2	6
(Croatia) D Vekić	5	6	4
(Czech Republic) A Hlaváčková	6	6
(Spain) E Cabeza Candela	2	4
Q	(Romania) A Dulgheru	6	6^{6}	6
(Kazakhstan) Y Putintseva	1	7^{8}	4
(Austria) P Mayr-Achleitner	1	6^{1}
8	(China) S Peng	6	7^{7}
4	(Russia) E Makarova	3	6	6
Q	(Ukraine) O Savchuk	6	2	4
WC	(Russia) V Zvonareva	6	6
WC	(Thailand) Pe Plipuech	3	2
(Chinese Taipei) S-w Hsieh	2	6^{4}
(Slovenia) T Majerič	6	7^{7}
(Japan) K Date-Krumm	6^{2}	7	7^{8}
6	(Spain) G Muguruza	7^{7}	5	6^{6}

Second round
1	(Germany) S Lisicki
(Czech Republic) A Hlaváčková	w/o
Q	(Romania) A Dulgheru	3	4
8	(China) S Peng	6	6
4	(Russia) E Makarova	6	6
WC	(Russia) V Zvonareva	0	2
(Slovenia) T Majerič	6^{4}	3
(Japan) K Date-Krumm	7^{7}	6

Quarterfinals
(Czech Republic) A Hlaváčková	6	7
8	(China) S Peng	2	5
4	(Russia) E Makarova	6	4	6
(Japan) K Date-Krumm	2	6	4

Semifinals
(Czech Republic) A Hlaváčková	3	6	4
4	(Russia) E Makarova	6	0	6

=== Bottom half ===
First round
7	(United States) B Mattek-Sands	2	4
(Czech Republic) Ka Plíšková	6	6
(Croatia) A Tomljanović	4	5
Q	(Russia) A Kudryavtseva	6	7
(Spain) A Medina Garrigues	0	0
(United States) A Riske	6	6
(Slovakia) AK Schmiedlová	1	3
3	(Romania) S Cîrstea	6	6
5	(Russia) E Vesnina	7^{8}	6^{5}	6
(United States) V King	6^{6}	7^{7}	1
Q	(Serbia) A Krunic	3	3
WC	(Thailand) N Lertpitaksinchai	6	6
(Thailand) L Kumkhum	4	4
(Germany) J Görges	6	6
(China) S Zhang	0	6^{3}
2/WC	(Russia) S Kuznetsova	6	7^{7}

Second round
(Czech Republic) Ka Plíšková	4	6	6
Q	(Russia) A Kudryavtseva	6	3	4
(United States) A Riske	3	4
3	(Romania) S Cîrstea	6	6
5	(Russia) E Vesnina	6	6
WC	(Thailand) N Lertpitaksinchai	3	3
(Germany) J Görges	w/o
2/WC	(Russia) S Kuznetsova

Quarterfinals
(Czech Republic) Ka Plíšková	1	7^{7}	6
3	(Romania) S Cîrstea	6	6^{3}	0
5	(Russia) E Vesnina	7	3	3
(Germany) J Görges	5	6	6

Semifinals
(Czech Republic) Ka Plíšková	6	4	6
(Germany) J Görges	3	6	3

== Qualifying ==
=== Seeds ===
1. (Russia) Olga Puchkova (first round)
2. (Serbia) Aleksandra Krunić (qualified)
3. (Kazakhstan) Zarina Diyas (first round)
4. (Australia) Anastasia Rodionova (qualifying competition)
5. (Russia) Alla Kudryavtseva (qualified)
6. (Romania) Alexandra Dulgheru (qualified)
7. (Japan) Sachie Ishizu (qualifying competition)
8. (Poland) Paula Kania (first round)

=== Qualifiers ===
1. (Ukraine) Olga Savchuk
2. (Serbia) Aleksandra Krunić
3. (Russia) Alla Kudryavtseva
4. (Romania) Alexandra Dulgheru

=== Qualifying draw ===
==== First qualifier ====
First round
1	(Russia) Olga Puchkova	6	4	5
(Ukraine) Olga Savchuk	4	6	7
(Japan) Risa Ozaki	0	6	5
7	(Japan) Sachie Ishizu	6	4	7

Qualifying competition
(Ukraine) Olga Savchuk	6	6
7	(Japan) Sachie Ishizu	0	2

==== Second qualifier ====
First round
2	(Serbia) Aleksandra Krunić	6	6
(Greece) Eleni Daniilidou	4	3
(China) Duan Yingying	6	6
8	(Poland) Paula Kania	4	4

Qualifying competition
2	(Serbia) Aleksandra Krunić	6	7
(China) Duan Yingying	2	5

==== Third qualifier ====
First round
3	(Kazakhstan) Zarina Diyas	2	6^{4}
(Switzerland) Belinda Bencic	6	7^{7}
WC	(Thailand) Noppawan Lertcheewakarn	1	2
5	(Russia) Alla Kudryavtseva	6	6

Qualifying competition
(Switzerland) Belinda Bencic	3	3
5	(Russia) Alla Kudryavtseva	6	6

==== Fourth qualifier ====
First round
4	(Australia) Anastasia Rodionova	6	6
(Russia) Alisa Kleybanova	4	4
WC	(Thailand) Varatchaya Wongteanchai	4	1
6	(Romania) Alexandra Dulgheru	6	6

Qualifying competition
4	(Australia) Anastasia Rodionova	6	4	6^{2}
6	(Romania) Alexandra Dulgheru	3	6	7^{7}
