= 2014 PTT Pattaya Open – Doubles =

Doubles
- 2014 PTT Pattaya Open

Final
- Champions: (China) Peng Shuai (China) Zhang Shuai
- Runners-up: (Russia) Alla Kudryavtseva (Australia) Anastasia Rodionova
- Score: 3–6, 7–6^{(7–5)}, [10–6]

Details
- Draw: 16
- Seeds: 4

Events
Singles	Doubles
← 2013 ·	PTT Pattaya Open	· 2015 →

Kimiko Date-Krumm and Casey Dellacqua were the defending champions, but Dellacqua decided not to participate. Date-Krumm played alongside Ajla Tomljanović, but lost to Alla Kudryavtseva and Anastasia Rodionova in the quarterfinals.

Peng Shuai and Zhang Shuai won the title, defeating Kudryavtseva and Rodionova in the final, 3–6, 7–6^{(7–5)}, [10–6].

== Seeds ==
1. (Russia) Ekaterina Makarova / (Russia) Elena Vesnina (first round)
2. (Czech Republic) Andrea Hlaváčková / (Spain) Anabel Medina Garrigues (semifinals)
3. (Russia) Alla Kudryavtseva / (Australia) Anastasia Rodionova (final)
4. (China) Peng Shuai / (China) Zhang Shuai (champions)

== Draw ==
=== Key ===
- Q = Qualifier
- WC = Wild card
- LL = Lucky loser
- Alt = Alternate
- SE = Special exempt
- PR = Protected ranking
- ITF = ITF entry
- JE = Junior exempt
- w/o = Walkover
- r = Retired
- d = Defaulted
- SR = Special ranking

=== Draw ===
First round
1	(Russia) E Makarova (Russia) E Vesnina	0	4
WC	(Thailand) N Lertcheewakarn (Russia) V Zvonareva	6	6
(Thailand) N Lertpitaksinchai (Thailand) P Plipuech	6	2	[9]
(Greece) E Daniilidou (Serbia) A Krunić	4	6	[11]
4	(China) S Peng (China) S Zhang	6	6
(Japan) S Aoyama (Romania) A Dulgheru	3	3
(Chinese Taipei) C-w Chan (China) Y Xu	6^{5}	5
(Ukraine) O Savchuk (Thailand) T Tanasugarn	7^{7}	7
(Japan) K Date-Krumm (Croatia) A Tomljanović	2	6	[10]
(Chinese Taipei) S-y Hsieh (Chinese Taipei) S-w Hsieh	6	4	[8]
(Poland) P Kania (Russia) V Solovyeva	5	4
3	(Russia) A Kudryavtseva (Australia) A Rodionova	7	6
(Chinese Taipei) C-j Chuang (Thailand) L Kumkhum	6	6
WC	(Thailand) Vara Wongteanchai (Thailand) Varu Wongteanchai	1	3
(Croatia) D Jurak (Slovenia) A Klepač	1	3
2	(Czech Republic) A Hlaváčková (Spain) A Medina Garrigues	6	6

Quarterfinals
WC	(Thailand) N Lertcheewakarn (Russia) V Zvonareva	6	2	[10]
(Greece) E Daniilidou (Serbia) A Krunić	1	6	[6]
4	(China) S Peng (China) S Zhang	6	6
(Ukraine) O Savchuk (Thailand) T Tanasugarn	4	1
(Japan) K Date-Krumm (Croatia) A Tomljanović	5	1
3	(Russia) A Kudryavtseva (Australia) A Rodionova	7	6
(Chinese Taipei) C-j Chuang (Thailand) L Kumkhum	4	5
2	(Czech Republic) A Hlaváčková (Spain) A Medina Garrigues	6	7

Semifinals
WC	(Thailand) N Lertcheewakarn (Russia) V Zvonareva	2	3
4	(China) S Peng (China) S Zhang	6	6
3	(Russia) A Kudryavtseva (Australia) A Rodionova	6	7
2	(Czech Republic) A Hlaváčková (Spain) A Medina Garrigues	3	5

Final
4	(China) S Peng (China) S Zhang	3	7^{7}	[10]
3	(Russia) A Kudryavtseva (Australia) A Rodionova	6	6^{5}	[6]
