= 2012 PTT Pattaya Open =

- Date: 5–12 February
- Edition: 21st
- Category: WTA International tournaments
- Draw: 32S / 16D
- Prize money: $220,000
- Surface: Hard / outdoor
- Location: Pattaya, Thailand

Champions

Singles
- (Slovakia) Daniela Hantuchová

Doubles
- (India) Sania Mirza / (Australia) Anastasia Rodionova
← 2011 ·	PTT Pattaya Open	· 2013 →

The 2012 PTT Pattaya Open was a women's professional tennis tournament played on outdoor hard courts. It was the 21st edition of the PTT Pattaya Open and was part of the International category on the 2012 WTA Tour. It took place at the Dusit Thani Hotel in Pattaya, Thailand from February 5 through February 12, 2012. Third-seeded Daniela Hantuchová won the singles title.

Third-seeded Daniela Hantuchová won her second consecutive singles title at the event and earned $37,000 first-prize money.

== Finals ==
=== Singles ===
(Slovakia) Daniela Hantuchová defeated (Russia) Maria Kirilenko, 6–7^{(4–7)}, 6–3, 6–3

- It was Hantuchová's 1st singles title of the year and 5th of her career.

=== Doubles ===
(India) Sania Mirza / (Australia) Anastasia Rodionova defeated (Chinese Taipei) Chan Hao-ching / (Chinese Taipei) Chan Yung-jan, 3–6, 6–1, [10–8]

== Singles main-draw entrants ==
=== Seeds ===
Country	Player	Ranking^{1}	Seed
RUS	Vera Zvonareva	8	1
SVK	Dominika Cibulková	16	2
SVK	Daniela Hantuchová	20	3
RUS	Maria Kirilenko	26	4
CHN	Zheng Jie	35	5
KAZ	Galina Voskoboeva	46	6
ROU	Sorana Cîrstea	54	7
USA	Vania King	59	8

- ^{1} Rankings as of January 30, 2012

=== Other entrants ===
The following players received wildcards into the main draw:

- (Thailand) Noppawan Lertcheewakarn
- (Thailand) Nicha Lertpitaksinchai
- (Thailand) Nungnadda Wannasuk

The following players received entry from the qualifying draw:

- (Chinese Taipei) Chang Kai-Chen
- (Chinese Taipei) Hsieh Su-wei
- (Thailand) Varatchaya Wongteanchai
- (China) Zhou Yimiao

=== Retirements ===
- (United Kingdom) Laura Robson (lower back injury)
- (Kazakhstan) Galina Voskoboeva (illness)
- (Russia) Vera Zvonareva (left hip injury)

== Doubles main-draw entrants ==
=== Seeds ===
Country	Player	Country	Player	Rank^{1}	Seed
IND	Sania Mirza	AUS	Anastasia Rodionova	41	1
GRE	Eleni Daniilidou	THA	Tamarine Tanasugarn	135	2
UZB	Akgul Amanmuradova	JPN	Kimiko Date-Krumm	142	3
TPE	Chan Hao-ching	TPE	Chan Yung-jan	147	4

- ^{1} Rankings are as of January 30, 2012

=== Retirements ===
- (Chinese Taipei) Kai-Chen Chang (illness)
- (United Kingdom) Anne Keothavong (illness)
- (Thailand) Tamarine Tanasugarn (severe illness)
