= 2011 PTT Pattaya Open – Singles qualifying =

This article displays the qualifying draw of the 2011 PTT Pattaya Open.

== Players ==
=== Seeds ===
1. (India) Sania Mirza (first round)
2. (Kazakhstan) Sesil Karatantcheva (first round)
3. (Kazakhstan) Zarina Diyas (qualified)
4. (Turkey) Çağla Büyükakçay (qualifying competition)
5. (Japan) Erika Sema (qualifying competition)
6. (China) Lu Jingjing (first round)
7. (United States) Lindsay Lee-Waters (qualifying competition)
8. (Japan) Ryoko Fuda (first round)

=== Qualifiers ===
1. (Kazakhstan) Galina Voskoboeva
2. (Kyrgyzstan) Ksenia Palkina
3. (Kazakhstan) Zarina Diyas
4. (Thailand) Nungnadda Wannasuk

== Qualifying draw ==
=== First qualifier ===
First round
1	(India) Sania Mirza	4	4
(Kazakhstan) Galina Voskoboeva	6	6
(Japan) Tomoko Yonemura	2	4
7	(United States) Lindsay Lee-Waters	6	6

Qualifying competition
(Kazakhstan) Galina Voskoboeva	4	6	6
7	(United States) Lindsay Lee-Waters	6	1	0

=== Second qualifier ===
First round
2	(Kazakhstan) Sesil Karatantcheva	3	6	4
(Kyrgyzstan) Ksenia Palkina	6	4	6
(South Korea) Kim So-jung	5	4
5	(Japan) Erika Sema	7	6

Qualifying competition
(Kyrgyzstan) Ksenia Palkina	6	6
5	(Japan) Erika Sema	2	4

=== Third qualifier ===
First round
3	(Kazakhstan) Zarina Diyas	6	6
(Australia) Jessica Moore	2	3
(China) Sun Shengnan	7	6^{1}	6
8	(Japan) Ryoko Fuda	5	7	3

Qualifying competition
3	(Kazakhstan) Zarina Diyas	7	6
(China) Sun Shengnan	6^{3}	3

=== Fourth qualifier ===
First round
4	(Turkey) Çağla Büyükakçay	6	6
WC	(Thailand) Tanaporn Thongsing	2	0
WC	(Thailand) Nungnadda Wannasuk	7	6
6	(China) Lu Jingjing	5	1

Qualifying competition
4	(Turkey) Çağla Büyükakçay	3	3
WC	(Thailand) Nungnadda Wannasuk	6	6
