= 2011 PTT Pattaya Open – Doubles =

Doubles
- 2011 PTT Pattaya Open

Final
- Champions: (Italy) Sara Errani (Italy) Roberta Vinci
- Runners-up: (China) Sun Shengnan (China) Zheng Jie
- Score: 3–6, 6–3, [10–5]

Details
- Draw: 16
- Seeds: 4

Events
| Singles | Doubles |
| ← 2010 · | PTT Pattaya Open | · 2012 → |

Marina Erakovic and Tamarine Tanasugarn were the defending champions, but Erakovic chose not to participate this year.
Tanasugarn partnered with Jill Craybas, but lost in the quarterfinals to Sun Shengnan and Zheng Jie.
In the final, Sara Errani and Roberta Vinci defeated Sun and Zheng, 3–6, 6–3, [10–5].

== Seeds ==
1. (Italy) Sara Errani / (Italy) Roberta Vinci (champions)
2. (Uzbekistan) Akgul Amanmuradova / (Czech Republic) Renata Voráčová (quarterfinals)
3. (United States) Jill Craybas / (Thailand) Tamarine Tanasugarn (quarterfinals)
4. (Chinese Taipei) Chang Kai-chen / (India) Sania Mirza (semifinals)

== Draw ==
=== Key ===
- Q = Qualifier
- WC = Wild card
- LL = Lucky loser
- Alt = Alternate
- SE = Special exempt
- PR = Protected ranking
- ITF = ITF entry
- JE = Junior exempt
- w/o = Walkover
- r = Retired
- d = Defaulted
- SR = Special ranking

=== Draw ===
First round
1 | (Italy) S Errani (Italy) R Vinci | 6 | 6
(Ukraine) T Arefyeva (Kazakhstan) G Voskoboeva | 1 | 3
(Italy) A Brianti (China) S Zhang | 6 | 6
(China) J Lu (China) Y Xu | 4 | 4
4 | (Chinese Taipei) K-c Chang (India) S Mirza | 6^{7} | 7 | [10]
(Thailand) N Lertcheewakarn (Australia) J Moore | 7 | 5 | [0]
WC | (Thailand) N Lertpitaksinchai (Thailand) N Wannasuk | 4 | 6^{2}
(Japan) K Date-Krumm (Italy) R Oprandi | 6 | 7
WC | (Indonesia) Y Basuki (Thailand) V Wongteanchai | 3 | 3
(China) S Sun (China) J Zheng | 6 | 6
3 | (United States) J Craybas (Thailand) T Tanasugarn | 7 | 6
(Italy) N Clerico (Kyrgyzstan) K Palkina | 6^{9} | 2
(China) W Liu (Japan) T Yonemura | 1 | 6^{2}
Alt | (Chinese Taipei) H-c Chan (Chinese Taipei) Y-j Chan | 6 | 7
(United States) L Lee-Waters (United States) M Moulton-Levy | 6^{6} | 4
2 | (Uzbekistan) A Amanmuradova (Czech Republic) R Voráčová | 7 | 6

Quarterfinals
1 | (Italy) S Errani (Italy) R Vinci | 7 | 7
(Italy) A Brianti (China) S Zhang | 6^{7} | 5
4 | (Chinese Taipei) K-c Chang (India) S Mirza | 6 | 6
(Japan) K Date-Krumm (Italy) R Oprandi | 1 | 2
(China) S Sun (China) J Zheng | 6^{9} | 6 | [10]
3 | (United States) J Craybas (Thailand) T Tanasugarn | 7 | 2 | [4]
Alt | (Chinese Taipei) H-c Chan (Chinese Taipei) Y-j Chan | 7 | 6
2 | (Uzbekistan) A Amanmuradova (Czech Republic) R Voráčová | 6^{3} | 3

Semifinals
1 | (Italy) S Errani (Italy) R Vinci | 6 | 6
4 | (Chinese Taipei) K-c Chang (India) S Mirza | 3 | 3
(China) S Sun (China) J Zheng | 6 | 3 | [10]
Alt | (Chinese Taipei) H-c Chan (Chinese Taipei) Y-j Chan | 2 | 6 | [4]

Final
1 | (Italy) S Errani (Italy) R Vinci | 3 | 6 | [10]
(China) S Sun (China) J Zheng | 6 | 3 | [5]
