= 2013 PTT Pattaya Open – Singles =

Singles
- 2013 PTT Pattaya Open

Final
- Champion: (Russia) Maria Kirilenko
- Runner-up: (Germany) Sabine Lisicki
- Score: 5–7, 6–1, 7–6^{(7–1)}

Details
- Draw: 32
- Seeds: 8

Events
Singles	Doubles
← 2012 ·	PTT Pattaya Open	· 2014 →

Daniela Hantuchová was the two-time defending champion but retired against Nina Bratchikova in the second round.
Maria Kirilenko became the new champion after defeating Sabine Lisicki 5–7, 6–1, 7–6^{(7–1)} in the final.

== Seeds ==
1. (Serbia) Ana Ivanovic (first round)
2. (Russia) Maria Kirilenko (champion)
3. (Chinese Taipei) Hsieh Su-wei (first round)
4. (Romania) Sorana Cîrstea (semifinals)
5. (Germany) Sabine Lisicki (final)
6. (Slovakia) Daniela Hantuchová (second round, retired due to dizziness)
7. (Russia) Elena Vesnina (quarterfinals)
8. (United Kingdom) Heather Watson (second round)

== Draw ==
=== Key ===
- Q = Qualifier
- WC = Wild card
- LL = Lucky loser
- Alt = Alternate
- SE = Special exempt
- PR = Protected ranking
- ITF = ITF entry
- JE = Junior exempt
- w/o = Walkover
- r = Retired
- d = Defaulted
- SR = Special ranking

=== Finals ===
Semifinals
(Russia) Nina Bratchikova	5	3
5	(Germany) Sabine Lisicki	7	6
4	(Romania) Sorana Cîrstea	0	2
2	(Russia) Maria Kirilenko	6	6

Final
5	(Germany) Sabine Lisicki	7	1	6^{1}
2	(Russia) Maria Kirilenko	5	6	7^{7}

=== Top half ===
First round
1	(Serbia) A Ivanovic	3	7	3
(Japan) A Morita	6	5	6
(South Africa) C Scheepers	5	1
(Japan) K Date-Krumm	7	6
(Russia) N Bratchikova	6	6
(Israel) S Pe'er	3	3
(Russia) O Puchkova	1	6	0
6/WC	(Slovakia) D Hantuchová	6	3	6
3	(Chinese Taipei) S-w Hsieh	2	2
(New Zealand) M Erakovic	6	6
WC	(Thailand) Vara Wongteanchai	6	6
(Germany) A Beck	3	3
(Russia) A Panova	7^{8}	3
(Romania) I-C Begu	6^{6}	2^{r}
(Germany) T Malek	2	3
5	(Germany) S Lisicki	6	6

Second round
(Japan) A Morita	4	6	6
(Japan) K Date-Krumm	6	4	1
(Russia) N Bratchikova	6	3
6/WC	(Slovakia) D Hantuchová	2	0^{r}
(New Zealand) M Erakovic	6	7^{7}
WC	(Thailand) Vara Wongteanchai	3	6^{4}
(Russia) A Panova	5	2
5	(Germany) S Lisicki	7	6

Quarterfinals
(Japan) A Morita	1	6	1
(Russia) N Bratchikova	6	3	6
(New Zealand) M Erakovic	7	3	2
5	(Germany) S Lisicki	5	6	6

Semifinals
(Russia) N Bratchikova	5	3
5	(Germany) S Lisicki	7	6

=== Bottom half ===
First round
8	(United Kingdom) H Watson	6	3
(Hungary) T Babos	1	0^{r}
Q	(Latvia) A Sevastova	6	6
(Japan) M Doi	4	2
(United States) V King	4	4
Q	(Australia) A Rodionova	6	6
Q	(United States) B Mattek-Sands	1	3
4	(Romania) S Cîrstea	6	6
7	(Russia) E Vesnina	6	5	6
(Greece) E Daniilidou	2	7	2
(France) M Johansson	6	6
(Chinese Taipei) K-c Chang	4	3
WC	(Thailand) L Kumkhum	6	6
(Australia) C Dellacqua	2	2
Q	(Uzbekistan) A Amanmuradova	3	5
2	(Russia) M Kirilenko	6	7

Second round
8	(United Kingdom) H Watson	6^{4}	6	2
Q	(Latvia) A Sevastova	7^{7}	4	6
Q	(Australia) A Rodionova	0	6^{3}
4	(Romania) S Cîrstea	6	7^{7}
7	(Russia) E Vesnina	6	3	6
(France) M Johansson	2	6	1
WC	(Thailand) L Kumkhum	7	2	2
2	(Russia) M Kirilenko	5	6	6

Quarterfinals
Q	(Latvia) A Sevastova	3	0
4	(Romania) S Cîrstea	6	6
7	(Russia) E Vesnina	6^{6}	3
2	(Russia) M Kirilenko	7^{8}	6

Semifinals
4	(Romania) S Cîrstea	0	2
2	(Russia) M Kirilenko	6	6

== Qualifying ==
=== Seeds ===
1. (Chinese Taipei) Chan Yung-jan (first round, retired)
2. (China) Duan Yingying (qualifying competition)
3. (Australia) Anastasia Rodionova (qualified)
4. (Japan) Kurumi Nara (first round)
5. (China) Zhou Yimiao (first round)
6. (United States) Bethanie Mattek-Sands (qualified)
7. (Latvia) Anastasija Sevastova (qualified)
8. (Russia) Valeria Solovyeva (first round)

=== Qualifiers ===
1. (Latvia) Anastasija Sevastova
2. (United States) Bethanie Mattek-Sands
3. (Australia) Anastasia Rodionova
4. (Uzbekistan) Akgul Amanmuradova

=== Draw ===
==== First qualifier ====
First round
1	(Chinese Taipei) Chan Yung-jan	2	1^{r}
(United States) Alison Riske	6	3
(Thailand) Nudnida Luangnam	6	4	2
7	(Latvia) Anastasija Sevastova	3	6	6

Qualifying competition
(United States) Alison Riske	6	5	6^{6}
7	(Latvia) Anastasija Sevastova	4	7	7^{8}

==== Second qualifier ====
First round
2	(China) Duan Yingying	6	7
(China) Xu Yifan	2	5
WC	(Thailand) Kotcha Nattawadee	3	0
6	(United States) Bethanie Mattek-Sands	6	6

Qualifying competition
2	(China) Duan Yingying	2	2
6	(United States) Bethanie Mattek-Sands	6	6

==== Third qualifier ====
First round
3	(Australia) Anastasia Rodionova	6	6
WC	(Thailand) Noppawan Lertcheewakarn	3	2
(Kazakhstan) Zarina Diyas	6	6
5	(China) Zhou Yimiao	1	2

Qualifying competition
3	(Australia) Anastasia Rodionova	4	6	6
(Kazakhstan) Zarina Diyas	6	3	2

==== Fourth qualifier ====
First round
4	(Japan) Kurumi Nara	3	2
(China) Wang Qiang	6	6
(Uzbekistan) Akgul Amanmuradova	2	6	6
8	(Russia) Valeria Solovyeva	6	3	4

Qualifying competition
(China) Wang Qiang	3	0
(Uzbekistan) Akgul Amanmuradova	6	6
