= 2012 PTT Pattaya Open – Singles =

Singles
- 2012 PTT Pattaya Open

Final
- Champion: (Slovakia) Daniela Hantuchová
- Runner-up: (Russia) Maria Kirilenko
- Score: 6–7^{(4–7)}, 6–3, 6–3

Details
- Draw: 32
- Seeds: 8

Events
Singles	Doubles
← 2011 ·	PTT Pattaya Open	· 2013 →

Daniela Hantuchová successfully defended her title beating Maria Kirilenko 6–7^{(4–7)}, 6–3, 6–3 in the final.

== Seeds ==
1. (Russia) Vera Zvonareva (quarterfinals, retired due to a left hip injury)
2. (Slovakia) Dominika Cibulková (first round)
3. (Slovakia) Daniela Hantuchová (champion)
4. (Russia) Maria Kirilenko (final)
5. (China) Zheng Jie (first round)
6. (Kazakhstan) Galina Voskoboeva (first round, retired)
7. (Romania) Sorana Cîrstea (semifinals)
8. (United States) Vania King (quarterfinals)

== Draw ==
=== Key ===
- Q = Qualifier
- WC = Wild card
- LL = Lucky loser
- Alt = Alternate
- SE = Special exempt
- PR = Protected ranking
- ITF = ITF entry
- JE = Junior exempt
- w/o = Walkover
- r = Retired
- d = Defaulted
- SR = Special ranking

=== Finals ===
Semifinals
7	(Romania) Sorana Cîrstea	2	7	4
4	(Russia) Maria Kirilenko	6	5	6
3	(Slovakia) Daniela Hantuchová	6	6
Q	(Chinese Taipei) Hsieh Su-wei	4	1

Final
4	(Russia) Maria Kirilenko	7^{7}	3	3
3	(Slovakia) Daniela Hantuchová	6^{4}	6	6

=== Top half ===
First round
1	(Russia) V Zvonareva	6	7
Q	(Thailand) V Wongteanchai	2	5
(United Kingdom) L Robson	2^{r}
(Uzbekistan) A Amanmuradova	5
WC	(Thailand) N Lertcheewakarn	1	3
(Japan) M Doi	6	6
(Japan) E Sema	2	2
7	(Romania) S Cîrstea	6	6
4	(Russia) M Kirilenko	4	7^{8}	6
(Australia) C Dellacqua	6	6^{6}	3
(Australia) A Rodionova	6	6
(France) I Brémond	4	0
Q	(Chinese Taipei) K-c Chang	7	6
(Greece) E Daniilidou	5	1
(Thailand) T Tanasugarn	6	4
6	(Kazakhstan) G Voskoboeva	3	2^{r}

Second round
1	(Russia) V Zvonareva	6	6
(Uzbekistan) A Amanmuradova	3	3
(Japan) M Doi	2	2
7	(Romania) S Cîrstea	6	6
4	(Russia) M Kirilenko	2	6	7^{7}
(Australia) A Rodionova	6	3	6^{3}
Q	(Chinese Taipei) K-c Chang	6^{7}	3
(Thailand) T Tanasugarn	7^{9}	6

Quarterfinals
1	(Russia) V Zvonareva	6	4	2^{r}
7	(Romania) S Cîrstea	2	6	2
4	(Russia) M Kirilenko	7^{7}	6
(Thailand) T Tanasugarn	6^{2}	1

Semifinals
7	(Romania) S Cîrstea	2	7	4
4	(Russia) M Kirilenko	6	5	6

=== Bottom half ===
First round
8	(United States) V King	6	6
(United Kingdom) H Watson	4	2
(Russia) A Kudryavtseva	6	7
Q	(China) Y Zhou	1	5
(Russia) A Pivovarova	4	1
(Poland) U Radwańska	6	6
WC	(Thailand) N Wannasuk	2	0
3	(Slovakia) D Hantuchová	6	6
5	(China) J Zheng	3	2
Q	(Chinese Taipei) S-w Hsieh	6	6
WC	(Thailand) N Lertpitaksinchai	1	1
(Japan) K Date-Krumm	6	6
(India) S Mirza	3	6	6
(Japan) A Morita	6	1	2
(United Kingdom) A Keothavong	6	6
2	(Slovakia) D Cibulková	4	1

Second round
8	(United States) V King	6	6
(Russia) A Kudryavtseva	1	3
(Poland) U Radwańska	3	2
3	(Slovakia) D Hantuchová	6	6
Q	(Chinese Taipei) S-w Hsieh	7	6
(Japan) K Date-Krumm	5	0
(India) S Mirza	6	7
(United Kingdom) A Keothavong	4	5

Quarterfinals
8	(United States) V King	6^{7}	4
3	(Slovakia) D Hantuchová	7^{9}	6
Q	(Chinese Taipei) S-w Hsieh	7	6
(India) S Mirza	5	3

Semifinals
3	(Slovakia) D Hantuchová	6	6
Q	(Chinese Taipei) S-w Hsieh	4	1

== Qualifying ==
=== Seeds ===
1. (Chinese Taipei) Chang Kai-chen (qualified)
2. (France) Caroline Garcia (first round)
3. (Chinese Taipei) Hsieh Su-wei (qualified)
4. (Thailand) Varatchaya Wongteanchai (qualified)
5. (Japan) Misa Eguchi (qualifying competition)
6. (Australia) Sacha Jones (qualifying competition)
7. (Turkey) Çağla Büyükakçay (qualifying competition)
8. (China) Wang Qiang (qualifying competition)

=== Qualifiers ===
1. (Chinese Taipei) Chang Kai-chen
2. (China) Zhou Yimiao
3. (Chinese Taipei) Hsieh Su-wei
4. (Thailand) Varatchaya Wongteanchai

=== Draw ===
==== First qualifier ====
First round
1	(Chinese Taipei) Chang Kai-chen	7^{7}	6
(Thailand) Nudnida Luangnam	6^{2}	3
WC	(Thailand) Nattawadee Kotcha	1	3
7	(Turkey) Çağla Büyükakçay	6	6

Qualifying competition
1	(Chinese Taipei) Chang Kai-chen	6	6
7	(Turkey) Çağla Büyükakçay	0	2

==== Second qualifier ====
First round
2	(France) Caroline Garcia	4	6	6^{2}
(China) Zhou Yimiao	6	4	7^{7}
(Japan) Shiho Akita	6	1	4
6	(Australia) Sacha Jones	1	6	6

Qualifying competition
(China) Zhou Yimiao	6	6^{9}	6
6	(Australia) Sacha Jones	3	7^{11}	2

==== Third qualifier ====
First round
3	(Chinese Taipei) Hsieh Su-wei	6	6
WC	(Thailand) Tanaporn Thongsing	1	2
(United Kingdom) Emily Webley-Smith	0	1
8	(China) Wang Qiang	6	6

Qualifying competition
3	(Chinese Taipei) Hsieh Su-wei	6	6
8	(China) Wang Qiang	4	3

==== Fourth qualifier ====
First round
4	(Thailand) Varatchaya Wongteanchai	0	7	6
(Chinese Taipei) Hsu Wen-hsin	6	5	1
(Austria) Nicole Rottmann	1	0
5	(Japan) Misa Eguchi	6	6

Qualifying competition
4	(Thailand) Varatchaya Wongteanchai	6	6
5	(Japan) Misa Eguchi	4	3
