= 2015 PTT Thailand Open – Doubles =

Doubles
- 2015 PTT Thailand Open

Final
- Champions: (Chinese Taipei) Chan Hao-ching (Chinese Taipei) Chan Yung-jan
- Runners-up: (Japan) Shuko Aoyama (Thailand) Tamarine Tanasugarn
- Score: 2–6, 6–4, [10–3]

Details
- Draw: 15
- Seeds: 4

Events
Singles	Doubles
← 2014 ·	PTT Thailand Open

Peng Shuai and Zhang Shuai were the defending champions, however Peng chose not to participate. Zhang partnered with Chuang Chia-jung, but lost in the first round to Anastasia Rodionova and Vera Zvonareva.
Chan Hao-ching and Chan Yung-jan won the title, defeating Shuko Aoyama and Tamarine Tanasugarn in the final, 2–6, 6–4, [10–3].

== Seeds ==
1. (Chinese Taipei) Chan Hao-ching / (Chinese Taipei) Chan Yung-jan (champions)
2. (Japan) Kimiko Date-Krumm / (Russia) Alexandra Panova (quarterfinals)
3. (Australia) Jarmila Gajdošová / (Croatia) Ajla Tomljanović (quarterfinals)
4. (Chinese Taipei) Chan Chin-wei / (China) Xu Yifan (semifinals)

== Draw ==
=== Key ===
- Q = Qualifier
- WC = Wild card
- LL = Lucky loser
- Alt = Alternate
- ITF = ITF entry
- PR = Protected ranking
- SR = Special ranking
- SE = Special exempt
- JE = Junior exempt
- JR = Junior Accelerator Programme entrant
- CO = College Accelerator Programme entrant
- NG = Next Gen Accelerator Program entrant
- w/o = Walkover
- r = Retired
- d = Defaulted

=== Draw ===
First round
(Thailand) K Buayam (Thailand) L Kumkhum	6^{9}	3
(Thailand) N Lertpitaksinchai (Thailand) P Plipuech	7^{11}	6
3	(Australia) J Gajdošová (Croatia) A Tomljanović	6^{5}	6	[10]
WC	(Russia) E Kulichkova (Russia) E Rodina	7^{7}	2	[7]
(China) C Liang (China) K Zhang	4	7	[10]
(New Zealand) M Erakovic (Puerto Rico) M Puig	6	5	[5]
(Chinese Taipei) C-j Chuang (China) S Zhang	2	5
(Australia) An Rodionova (Russia) V Zvonareva	6	7
(Chinese Taipei) K-c Chang (Luxembourg) M Minella	7	1	[6]
4	(Chinese Taipei) C-w Chan (China) Y Xu	5	6	[10]
(Japan) S Aoyama (Thailand) T Tanasugarn	7	6
(Hong Kong) L Zhang (China) L Zhu	5	2
(Uzbekistan) A Amanmuradova (Ukraine) Y Beygelzimer	7	4	[6]
2	(Japan) K Date-Krumm (Russia) A Panova	5	6	[10]

Quarterfinals
1	(Chinese Taipei) H-c Chan (Chinese Taipei) Y-j Chan	6	6
(Thailand) N Lertpitaksinchai (Thailand) P Plipuech	2	4
3	(Australia) J Gajdošová (Croatia) A Tomljanović	3	4
(China) C Liang (China) K Zhang	6	6
(Australia) An Rodionova (Russia) V Zvonareva
4	(Chinese Taipei) C-w Chan (China) Y Xu	w/o
(Japan) S Aoyama (Thailand) T Tanasugarn	6	7
2	(Japan) K Date-Krumm (Russia) A Panova	1	5

Semifinals
1	(Chinese Taipei) H-c Chan (Chinese Taipei) Y-j Chan	6	6
(China) C Liang (China) K Zhang	3	3
4	(Chinese Taipei) C-w Chan (China) Y Xu	6	5	[7]
(Japan) S Aoyama (Thailand) T Tanasugarn	3	7	[10]

Final
1	(Chinese Taipei) H-c Chan (Chinese Taipei) Y-j Chan	2	6	[10]
(Japan) S Aoyama (Thailand) T Tanasugarn	6	4	[3]
