= 2015 PTT Thailand Open =

- Date: 9–15 February
- Edition: 24th
- Category: WTA International
- Draw: 32S / 16D
- Prize money: $250,000
- Surface: Hard
- Location: Pattaya, Thailand

Champions

Singles
- (Slovakia) Daniela Hantuchová

Doubles
- (Chinese Taipei) Chan Hao-ching / (Chinese Taipei) Chan Yung-jan
← 2014 ·	PTT Thailand Open

The 2015 PTT Thailand Open was a women's professional tennis tournament played on outdoor hard courts. It was the 24th and last edition of the PTT Thailand Open and part of the International category on the 2015 WTA Tour. It took place at the Dusit Thani Hotel in Pattaya, Thailand from 9 February until 15 February 2015. Unseeded Daniela Hantuchová won the singles title, her third at the event after 2011 and 2012, and earned $43,000 first-prize money.

== Finals ==
=== Singles ===
- (Slovakia) Daniela Hantuchová defeated (Croatia) Ajla Tomljanović, 3–6, 6–3, 6–4

=== Doubles ===
- (Chinese Taipei) Chan Hao-ching / (Chinese Taipei) Chan Yung-jan defeated (Japan) Shuko Aoyama / (Thailand) Tamarine Tanasugarn, 2–6, 6–4, [10–3]

== Points and prize money ==
=== Point distribution ===
Event	W	F	SF	QF	Round of 16	Round of 32	Q	Q2	Q1
Singles	280	180	110	60	30	1	18	12	1
Doubles	280	180	110	60	1	—	—	—	—

=== Prize money ===
Event	W	F	SF	QF	Round of 16	Round of 32^{1}	Q2	Q1
Singles	$43,000	$21,400	$11,500	$6,200	$3,420	$2,200	$1,285	$750
Doubles*	$12,300	$6,400	$3,435	$1,820	$960	—	—	—

_{^{1}Qualifiers prize money is also the Round of 32 prize money.}
_{*per team}

== Singles main-draw entrants ==
=== Seeds ===
Country	Player	Ranking^{1}	Seed
CHN	Peng Shuai	21	1
~~UKR~~	~~Elina Svitolina~~	~~26~~	~~2~~
KAZ	Zarina Diyas	33	3
JPN	Kurumi Nara	44	4
~~KAZ~~	~~Yaroslava Shvedova~~	~~51~~	~~5~~
AUS	Jarmila Gajdošová	54	6
PUR	Monica Puig	60	7
CHN	Zhang Shuai	64	8

- ^{1} Rankings as of February 2, 2015.

=== Other entrants ===
The following players received wildcards into the main draw:

- (Thailand) Nicha Lertpitaksinchai
- (Thailand) Tamarine Tanasugarn
- (Russia) Vera Zvonareva

The following players received entry from the qualifying draw:

- (Chinese Taipei) Chan Yung-jan
- (Japan) Misa Eguchi
- (Russia) Elizaveta Kulichkova
- (China) Xu Yifan

The following players received entry as lucky losers:

- (Ukraine) Yuliya Beygelzimer
- (China) Zhu Lin

=== Withdrawals ===
Before the tournament

- (Czech Republic) Denisa Allertová → replaced by (Russia) Evgeniya Rodina
- (Kazakhstan) Yaroslava Shvedova → replaced by (China) Zhu Lin
- (Czech Republic) Tereza Smitková → replaced by (China) Duan Yingying
- (Ukraine) Elina Svitolina → replaced by (Ukraine) Yuliya Beygelzimer

=== Retirements ===
- (China) Zhu Lin (right shoulder injury)

== Doubles main-draw entrants ==
=== Seeds ===
Country	Player	Country	Player	Rank^{1}	Seed
TPE	Chan Hao-ching	TPE	Chan Yung-jan	60	1
JPN	Kimiko Date-Krumm	RUS	Alexandra Panova	80	2
AUS	Jarmila Gajdošová	CRO	Ajla Tomljanović	120	3
TPE	Chan Chin-wei	CHN	Xu Yifan	152	4

- ^{1} Rankings are as of February 2, 2015.

=== Other entrants ===
The following pair received wildcards into the main draw:

- (Russia) Elizaveta Kulichkova / (Russia) Evgeniya Rodina

=== Withdrawals ===
During the tournament

- (Australia) Anastasia Rodionova / (Russia) Vera Zvonareva (unspecified reason)
