= 2011 PTT Pattaya Open =

- Date: 6–13 February
- Edition: 20th
- Category: WTA International
- Draw: 32S / 16D
- Prize money: $220,000
- Surface: Hard / outdoor
- Location: Pattaya, Thailand

Champions

Singles
- (Slovakia) Daniela Hantuchová

Doubles
- (Italy) Sara Errani / (Italy) Roberta Vinci
← 2010 ·	PTT Pattaya Open	· 2012 →

The 2011 PTT Pattaya Open was a women's professional tennis tournament played on outdoor hard courts. It was the 20th edition of the PTT Pattaya Open (formerly known as the Pattaya Women's Open) and was part of the International category on the 2011 WTA Tour. It took place at Dusit Thani Hotel in Pattaya, Thailand from February 6 through February 13, 2011.

== Finals ==
=== Singles ===
(Slovakia) Daniela Hantuchová defeated (Italy) Sara Errani, 6–0, 6–2.

- It was Hantuchová's first title of the year, and fourth of her career.

=== Doubles ===
(Italy) Sara Errani / (Italy) Roberta Vinci defeated (China) Sun Shengnan / (China) Zheng Jie, 3–6, 6–3, [10–5].

== WTA entrants ==
=== Seeds ===
Country	Player	Rank^{1}	Seed
RUS	Vera Zvonareva	3	1
SRB	Ana Ivanovic	19	2
RUS	Maria Kirilenko	25	3
SVK	Daniela Hantuchová	32	4
ITA	Roberta Vinci	38	5
CHN	Peng Shuai	40	6
CHN	Zheng Jie	43	7
ITA	Sara Errani	44	8

- ^{1} Rankings as of January 31, 2011.

=== Other entrants ===
The following players received wildcards into the main draw:

- (Thailand) Noppawan Lertcheewakarn
- (Thailand) Nicha Lertpitaksinchai
- (Thailand) Nudnida Luangnam

The following players received entry from the qualifying draw:

- (Kazakhstan) Zarina Diyas
- (Kyrgyzstan) Ksenia Palkina
- (Kazakhstan) Galina Voskoboeva
- (Thailand) Nungnadda Wannasuk
