= 2015 PTT Thailand Open – Singles =

Singles
- 2015 PTT Thailand Open

Final
- Champion: (Slovakia) Daniela Hantuchová
- Runner-up: (Croatia) Ajla Tomljanović
- Score: 3–6, 6–3, 6–4

Details
- Draw: 32
- Seeds: 8

Events
| Singles | Doubles |
| ← 2014 · | PTT Thailand Open |

Ekaterina Makarova was the defending champion, but chose not to participate this year.

Daniela Hantuchová won the title, defeating Ajla Tomljanović in the final, despite being two match points down against Marina Erakovic in the third set in the semifinal. This was Hantuchová's final WTA tour singles title, before her retirement in 2017.

== Seeds ==
1. (China) Peng Shuai (second round)
2. (Ukraine) Elina Svitolina (withdrew)
3. (Kazakhstan) Zarina Diyas (first round)
4. (Japan) Kurumi Nara (second round)
5. (Kazakhstan) Yaroslava Shvedova (withdrew)
6. (Australia) Jarmila Gajdošová (second round)
7. (Puerto Rico) Monica Puig (semifinals)
8. (China) Zhang Shuai (second round)

== Draw ==
=== Key ===
- Q = Qualifier
- WC = Wild card
- LL = Lucky loser
- Alt = Alternate
- ITF = ITF entry
- PR = Protected ranking
- SR = Special ranking
- SE = Special exempt
- JE = Junior exempt
- JR = Junior Accelerator Programme entrant
- CO = College Accelerator Programme entrant
- NG = Next Gen Accelerator Program entrant
- w/o = Walkover
- r = Retired
- d = Defaulted

=== Finals ===
Semifinals
7 | (Puerto Rico) Monica Puig | 6^{4} | 7 | 6^{7}
(Croatia) Ajla Tomljanović | 7^{7} | 5 | 7^{9}
(Slovakia) Daniela Hantuchová | 4 | 6 | 7^{7}
(New Zealand) Marina Erakovic | 6 | 3 | 6^{3}

Final
(Croatia) Ajla Tomljanović | 6 | 3 | 4
(Slovakia) Daniela Hantuchová | 3 | 6 | 6

=== Top half ===
First round
1 | (China) S Peng | 6 | 6
(Russia) A Kudryavtseva | 3 | 2
WC | (Thailand) T Tanasugarn | 6^{2} | 0
(Japan) M Doi | 7^{7} | 6
(Switzerland) R Oprandi | 6 | 6
(Russia) E Vesnina | 3 | 3
(Switzerland) S Vögele | 2 | 6^{4}
7 | (Puerto Rico) M Puig | 6 | 7^{7}
4 | (Japan) K Nara | 6 | 6
WC | (Thailand) N Lertpitaksinchai | 2 | 1
(Russia) E Rodina | 7^{7} | 6
(Kazakhstan) Y Putintseva | 6^{2} | 4
Q | (Russia) E Kulichkova | 3 | 6^{4}
(Croatia) A Tomljanović | 6 | 7^{7}
Q | (Japan) M Eguchi | 3 | 6^{1}
6 | (Australia) J Gajdošová | 6 | 7^{7}

Second round
1 | (China) S Peng | 3 | 6 | 2
(Japan) M Doi | 6 | 2 | 6
(Switzerland) R Oprandi | 1 | 6 | 0
7 | (Puerto Rico) M Puig | 6 | 3 | 6
4 | (Japan) K Nara | 2 | 4
(Russia) E Rodina | 6 | 6
(Croatia) A Tomljanović | 7^{7} | 6
6 | (Australia) J Gajdošová | 6^{3} | 3

Quarterfinals
(Japan) M Doi | 4 | 2
7 | (Puerto Rico) M Puig | 6 | 6
(Russia) E Rodina | 6^{4} | 2
(Croatia) A Tomljanović | 7^{7} | 6

Semifinals
7 | (Puerto Rico) M Puig | 6^{4} | 7 | 6^{7}
(Croatia) A Tomljanović | 7^{7} | 5 | 7^{9}

=== Bottom half ===
First round
LL | (China) L Zhu | 7^{7} | 6
(Israel) S Pe'er | 6^{5} | 1
(China) Y Duan | 7^{7} | 7
Q | (Chinese Taipei) Y-j Chan | 6^{4} | 5
Q | (China) Y Xu | 4 | 2
(China) S Zheng | 6 | 6
(Slovakia) D Hantuchová | 1 | 6 | 6
3 | (Kazakhstan) Z Diyas | 6 | 3 | 1
8 | (China) S Zhang | 6 | 6
(Croatia) D Vekić | 2 | 0
(China) Q Wang | 2 | 2
WC | (Russia) V Zvonareva | 6 | 6
(Thailand) L Kumkhum | 2 | 2
(New Zealand) M Erakovic | 6 | 6
(Japan) K Date-Krumm | 7 | 6^{6} | 2
LL | (Ukraine) Y Beygelzimer | 5 | 7^{8} | 6

Second round
LL | (China) L Zhu | 1 | 0^{r}
(China) Y Duan | 6 | 0
(China) S Zheng | 6^{5} | 2
(Slovakia) D Hantuchová | 7^{7} | 6
8 | (China) S Zhang | 6^{6} | 3
WC | (Russia) V Zvonareva | 7^{8} | 6
(New Zealand) M Erakovic | 6 | 6
LL | (Ukraine) Y Beygelzimer | 1 | 1

Quarterfinals
(China) Y Duan | 3 | 0
(Slovakia) D Hantuchová | 6 | 6
WC | (Russia) V Zvonareva | 6 | 6^{6} | 5
(New Zealand) M Erakovic | 2 | 7^{8} | 7

Semifinals
(Slovakia) D Hantuchová | 4 | 6 | 7^{7}
(New Zealand) M Erakovic | 6 | 3 | 6^{3}

== Qualifying ==
=== Seeds ===
1. (Russia) Alexandra Panova (first round)
2. (China) Zhu Lin (qualifying competition, lucky loser)
3. (Japan) Misa Eguchi (qualified)
4. (Ukraine) Yuliya Beygelzimer (qualifying competition, lucky loser)
5. (China) Xu Yifan (qualified)
6. (China) Liu Fangzhou (qualifying competition)
7. (Russia) Elizaveta Kulichkova (qualified)
8. (Chinese Taipei) Chan Yung-jan (qualified)

=== Qualifiers ===
1. (China) Xu Yifan
2. (Russia) Elizaveta Kulichkova
3. (Japan) Misa Eguchi
4. (Chinese Taipei) Chan Yung-jan

=== Lucky losers ===
1. (Ukraine) Yuliya Beygelzimer
2. (China) Zhu Lin

=== Draw ===
==== First qualifier ====
First round
1 | (Russia) Alexandra Panova | 6 | 5 | 4
(Australia) Anastasia Rodionova | 3 | 7 | 6
(Luxembourg) Mandy Minella | 3 | 2
5 | (China) Xu Yifan | 6 | 6

Qualifying competition
(Australia) Anastasia Rodionova | 1 | 3
5 | (China) Xu Yifan | 6 | 6

==== Second qualifier ====
First round
2 | (China) Zhu Lin | 6 | 6
(Japan) Shuko Aoyama | 2 | 2
WC | (Thailand) Kamonwan Buayam | 5 | 3
7 | (Russia) Elizaveta Kulichkova | 7 | 6

Qualifying competition
2 | (China) Zhu Lin | 5 | 2
7 | (Russia) Elizaveta Kulichkova | 7 | 6

==== Third qualifier ====
First round
3 | (Japan) Misa Eguchi | 4 | 6 | 6
(Czech Republic) Andrea Hlaváčková | 6 | 3 | 4
(Uzbekistan) Akgul Amanmuradova | 6 | 2 | 5
6 | (China) Liu Fangzhou | 3 | 6 | 7

Qualifying competition
3 | (Japan) Misa Eguchi | 6 | 6
6 | (China) Liu Fangzhou | 2 | 1

==== Fourth qualifier ====
First round
4 | (Ukraine) Yuliya Beygelzimer | 6 | 6
WC | (Thailand) Peangtarn Plipuech | 2 | 1
(Hong Kong) Zhang Ling | 1 | 1
8 | (Chinese Taipei) Chan Yung-jan | 6 | 6

Qualifying competition
4 | (Ukraine) Yuliya Beygelzimer | 6 | 1 | 3
8 | (Chinese Taipei) Chan Yung-jan | 4 | 6 | 6
