= Thailand Open (Pattaya) =

Women's tennis tournament held in Pattaya, Thailand

PTT Thailand Open

Defunct tennis tournament
- Founded: 1991
- Abolished: 2015
- Editions: 24
- Location: Pattaya; Thailand
- Venue: Dusit Thani Hotel
- Category: Tier V (1991–1992, 2001–2003); Tier IV (1993–2000, 2005–2008); International Series (2009–2015)
- Surface: Hardcourt (outdoor)
- Draw: 32S / 16D
- Prize money: $250,000

The Thailand Open (also known as PTT Pattaya Open) was a women's tennis tournament held in Pattaya, Thailand. Held since 1991, this WTA Tour event was classified as an International tournament and was played on hardcourts.

The event was part of the Tier V series from 1991 to 1992 and then again from 2001 to 2003. It was a Tier IV event from 1993 to 2000 and was promoted back to Tier IV in 2005, after a year's hiatus. Starting in 2009, the tournament became a WTA International tournament. The 2015 PTT Thailand Open was its last edition.

Daniela Hantuchová holds the record for the most singles titles won with three: 2011, a successful title defence in 2012, and 2015.

== Past finals ==
=== Singles ===
Year	Champion	Runner-up	Score
1991	(Indonesia) Yayuk Basuki	(Japan) Naoko Sawamatsu	6–2, 6–2
1992	(Belgium) Sabine Appelmans	(Czech Republic) Andrea Strnadová	7–5, 3–6, 7–5
1993	(Indonesia) Yayuk Basuki (2)	(United States) Marianne Werdel	6–3, 6–1
1994	(Belgium) Sabine Appelmans (2)	(United States) Patty Fendick	6–7^{(5–7)}, 7–6^{(7–5)}, 6–2
1995	(Austria) Barbara Paulus	(China) Yi Jingqian	6–4, 6–3
1996	(Romania) Ruxandra Dragomir	(Thailand) Tamarine Tanasugarn	7-6^{(7–4)}, 6-4
1997	(Slovakia) Henrieta Nagyová	(Belgium) Dominique van Roost	7–5, 6–7^{(6–8)}, 7–5
1998	(France) Julie Halard-Decugis	(China) Li Fang	6–1, 6–2
1999	(Bulgaria) Magdalena Maleeva	(Luxembourg) Anne Kremer	4–6, 6–1, 6–2
2000	(Luxembourg) Anne Kremer	(Russia) Tatiana Panova	6–1, 6–4
2001	(Switzerland) Patty Schnyder	(Slovakia) Henrieta Nagyová	6–0, 6–4
2002	(Indonesia) Angelique Widjaja	(South Korea) Cho Yoon-jeong	6–2, 6–4
2003	(Slovakia) Henrieta Nagyová (2)	(Slovakia) Ľubomíra Kurhajcová	6–4, 6–2
2005	(Spain) Conchita Martínez	(Germany) Anna-Lena Grönefeld	6–3, 3–6, 6–3
2006	(Israel) Shahar Pe'er	(Croatia) Jelena Kostanić Tošić	6–3, 6–1
2007	(Austria) Sybille Bammer	(Argentina) Gisela Dulko	7–5, 3–6, 7–5
2008	(Poland) Agnieszka Radwańska	(United States) Jill Craybas	6–2, 1–6, 7–6^{(7–4)}
2009	(Russia) Vera Zvonareva	(India) Sania Mirza	7–5, 6–1
2010	(Russia) Vera Zvonareva (2)	(Thailand) Tamarine Tanasugarn	6–4, 6–4
2011	(Slovakia) Daniela Hantuchová	(Italy) Sara Errani	6–0, 6–2
2012	(Slovakia) Daniela Hantuchová (2)	(Russia) Maria Kirilenko	6–7^{(4–7)}, 6–3, 6–3
2013	(Russia) Maria Kirilenko	(Germany) Sabine Lisicki	5–7, 6–1, 7–6^{(7–1)}
2014	(Russia) Ekaterina Makarova	(Czech Republic) Karolína Plíšková	6–3, 7–6^{(9–7)}
2015	(Slovakia) Daniela Hantuchová (3)	(Croatia) Ajla Tomljanović	3–6, 6–3, 6–4

=== Doubles ===
Year	Champions	Runners-up	Score
1991	(Japan) Nana Miyagi (Indonesia) Suzanna Wibowo	(Japan) Rika Hiraki (Japan) Akemi Nishiya	6–1, 6–4
1992	(France) Isabelle Demongeot (Ukraine) Natalia Medvedeva	(France) Pascale Paradis-Mangon (France) Sandrine Testud	6–1, 6–1
1993	(United States) Cammy MacGregor (France) Catherine Suire	(United States) Patty Fendick (United States) Meredith McGrath	6–3, 7–6^{(7–3)}
1994	(United States) Patty Fendick (United States) Meredith McGrath	(Indonesia) Yayuk Basuki (Japan) Nana Miyagi	7–6^{(7–0)}, 3–6, 6–3
1995	(Canada) Jill Hetherington (Australia) Kristine Kunce	(Australia) Kristin Godridge (Japan) Nana Miyagi	2–6, 6–4, 6–3
1996	(Japan) Miho Saeki (Japan) Yuka Yoshida	(Slovenia) Tina Križan (Japan) Nana Miyagi	6–2, 6–3
1997	(Australia) Kristine Kunce (2) (United States) Corina Morariu	(Argentina) Florencia Labat (Belgium) Dominique van Roost	6–3, 6–4
1998	(France) Julie Halard-Decugis (Belgium) Els Callens	(Japan) Rika Hiraki (Poland) Aleksandra Olsza	3–6, 6–2, 6–2
1999	(Sweden) Åsa Svensson (France) Émilie Loit	(Russia) Evgenia Koulikovskaya (Austria) Patricia Wartusch	6–1, 6–4
2000	(Indonesia) Yayuk Basuki (Netherlands) Caroline Vis	(Slovenia) Tina Križan (Slovenia) Katarina Srebotnik	6–3, 6–3
2001	(Sweden) Åsa Carlsson (2) (Uzbekistan) Iroda Tulyaganova	(South Africa) Liezel Huber (Indonesia) Wynne Prakusya	4–6, 6–3, 6–3
2002	(Republic of Ireland) Kelly Liggan (Czech Republic) Renata Voráčová	(Russia) Lina Krasnoroutskaya (Russia) Tatiana Panova	7–5, 7–6^{(9–7)}
2003	(China) Li Ting (China) Sun Tiantian	(Indonesia) Wynne Prakusya (Indonesia) Angelique Widjaja	6–4, 6–3
2005	(France) Marion Bartoli (Germany) Anna-Lena Grönefeld	(Poland) Marta Domachowska (Croatia) Silvija Talaja	6–3, 6–2
2006	(China) Li Ting (2) (China) Sun Tiantian (2)	(China) Yan Zi (China) Zheng Jie	3–6, 6–1, 7–6^{(7–5)}
2007	(Australia) Nicole Pratt (Italy) Mara Santangelo	(Chinese Taipei) Chan Yung-jan (Chinese Taipei) Chuang Chia-jung	6–4, 7–6^{(7–4)}
2008	(Chinese Taipei) Chan Yung-jan (Chinese Taipei) Chuang Chia-jung	(Chinese Taipei) Hsieh Su-wei (United States) Vania King	6–4, 6–3
2009	(Kazakhstan) Yaroslava Shvedova (Thailand) Tamarine Tanasugarn	(Ukraine) Yulia Beygelzimer (Russia) Vitalia Diatchenko	6–3, 6–2
2010	(New Zealand) Marina Erakovic (Thailand) Tamarine Tanasugarn (2)	(Russia) Anna Chakvetadze (Russia) Ksenia Pervak	7–5, 6–1
2011	(Italy) Sara Errani (Italy) Roberta Vinci	(China) Sun Shengnan (China) Zheng Jie	3–6, 6–3, [10–5]
2012	(India) Sania Mirza (Australia) Anastasia Rodionova	(Chinese Taipei) Chan Hao-ching (Chinese Taipei) Chan Yung-jan	3–6, 6–1, [10–8]
2013	(Japan) Kimiko Date-Krumm (Australia) Casey Dellacqua	(Uzbekistan) Akgul Amanmuradova (Russia) Alexandra Panova	6–3, 6–2
2014	(China) Peng Shuai (China) Zhang Shuai	(Russia) Alla Kudryavtseva (Australia) Anastasia Rodionova	3–6, 7–6^{(7–5)}, [10–6]
2015	(Chinese Taipei) Chan Hao-ching (Chinese Taipei) Chan Yung-jan (2)	(Japan) Shuko Aoyama (Thailand) Tamarine Tanasugarn	2–6, 6–4, [10–3]

== See also ==
- Thailand Open (ATP) – men's tournament
- List of tennis tournaments
