= Varunya Wongteanchai =

Thai tennis player (born 1993)

Varunya Wongteanchai วรัญญา วงศ์เทียนชัย
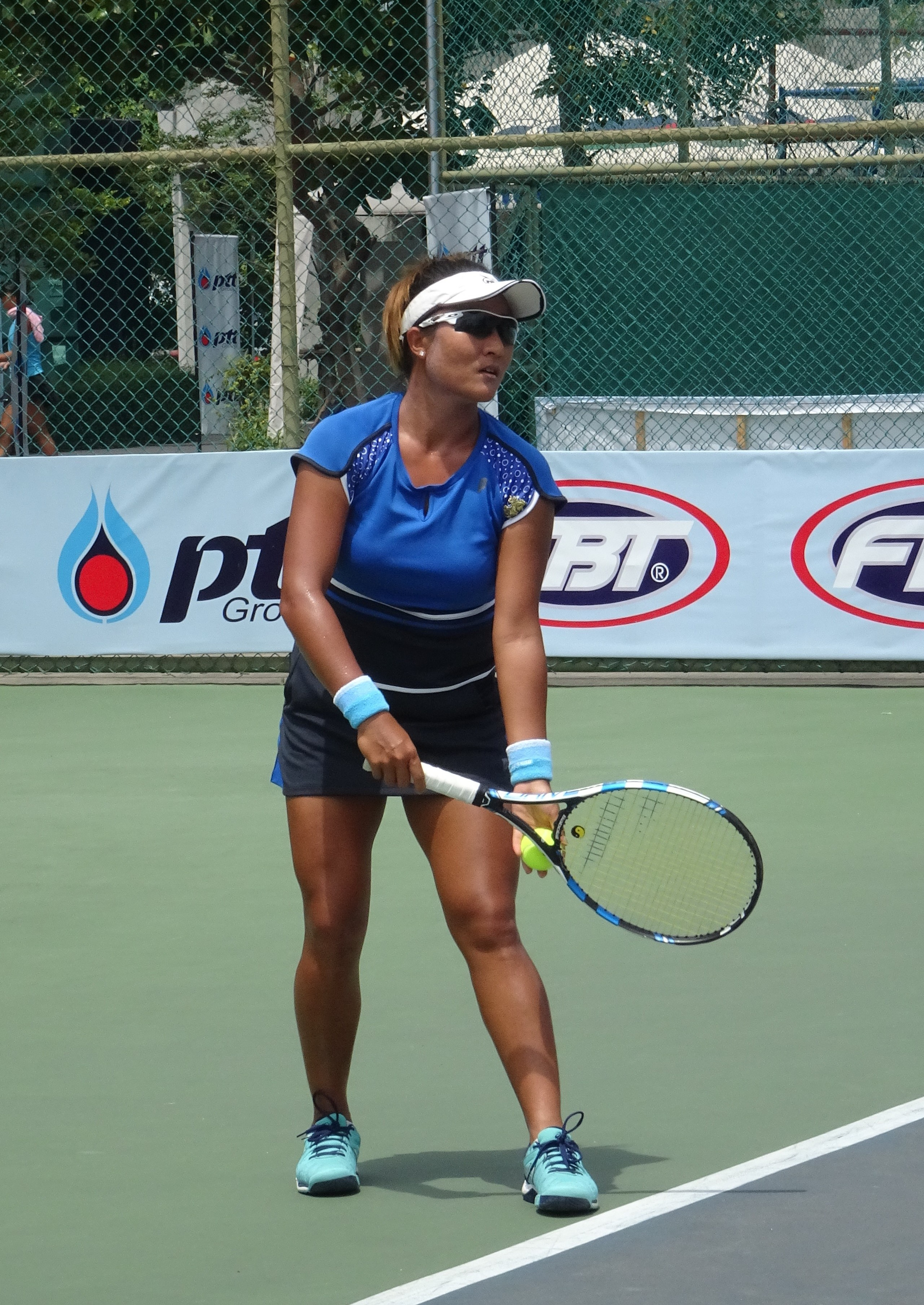
- Country (sports): Thailand
- Residence: Chiang Rai, Thailand
- Born: 7 January 1993 (age 32); Chiang Rai
- Plays: Right-handed (two-handed backhand)
- Prize money: $48,414

Singles
- Career record: 130–150
- Career titles: 0
- Highest ranking: No. 616 (3 October 2016)

Doubles
- Career record: 190–134
- Career titles: 17 ITF
- Highest ranking: No. 216 (9 February 2015)
- Current ranking: No. 1151 (26 December 2022)
- Last updated on: 28 December 2022.

Varunya "Yuyee" Wongteanchai (Thai: วรัญญา วงศ์เทียนชัย; born 7 January 1993) is a Thai tennis player. She is the younger sister of Varatchaya Wongteanchai who also plays on the ITF Women's Circuit.

On 3 October 2016, Varunya reached her highest WTA singles ranking of 616. On 9 February 2015, she peaked at No. 216 in the WTA doubles rankings.

== Career ==
Wongteanchai has had more success in doubles than singles, she has won 17 ITF doubles titles. At the 2012 PTT Pattaya Open, she partnered her sister Varatchaya and they defeated Dominika Cibulková and Janette Husárová in the first round, before losing to eventual champions Sania Mirza and Anastasia Rodionova.

At the 2013 PTT Pattaya Open, Wongteanchai again partnered with her sister after the pair gained entry by an alternate spot. They defeated third seeds Chan Hao-ching and Chan Yung-jan in the first round, then defeated Irina Buryachok and Valeria Solovyeva in the quarterfinals, before losing to Akgul Amanmuradova and Alexandra Panova in the semifinals.

== ITF finals ==
=== Singles (0–2) ===
Legend $25,000 tournaments $15,000 tournaments $10,000 tournaments	Finals by surface Hard (0–2) Clay (0–0) Carpet (0–0)

Result	No.	Date	Tournament	Surface	Opponent	Score
Loss	1.	3 October 2015	ITF Bangkok, Thailand	Hard	(Thailand) Kamonwan Buayam	1–6, 6–4, 2–6
Loss	2.	17 July 2016	ITF Hong Kong	Hard	(Japan) Mizuno Kijima	1–6, 2–6

=== Doubles (17–11) ===
Legend $50,000 tournaments $25,000 tournaments $15,000 tournaments $10,000 tournaments	Finals by surface Hard (17–10) Clay (0–1) Grass (0–0) Carpet (0–0)

Result	No.	Date	Tournament	Surface	Partner	Opponents	Score
Win	1.	18 February 2011	ITF Aurangabad, India	Hard	(Thailand) Varatchaya Wongteanchai	(Italy) Nicole Clerico (Italy) Maria Masini	4–6, 6–2, [10–6]
Win	2.	14 November 2011	ITF Manila, Philippines	Hard	(Thailand) Napatsakorn Sankaew	(Thailand) Luksika Kumkhum (Thailand) Peangtarn Plipuech	6–1, 3–6, [10–6]
Loss	1.	23 December 2011	Pune Championships, India	Hard	(Thailand) Varatchaya Wongteanchai	(China) Lu Jiajing (China) Lu Jiaxiang	1–6, 3–6
Loss	2.	10 March 2012	ITF Aurangabad, India	Clay	(Thailand) Peangtarn Plipuech	(Slovenia) Dalila Jakupović (Germany) Sarah-Rebecca Sekulic	1–6, 3–6
Win	3.	16 March 2012	ITF Mumbai, India	Hard	(Thailand) Peangtarn Plipuech	(Slovenia) Anja Prislan (India) Krya Shroff	6–1, 6–2
Loss	3.	8 July 2013	ITF Bangkok, Thailand	Hard	(Chinese Taipei) Lee Pei-chi	(China) Lu Jiajing (China) Lu Jiaxiang	4–6, 4–6
Loss	4.	9 November 2013	ITF Phuket, Thailand	Hard (i)	(Thailand) Peangtarn Plipuech	(China) Lu Jiajing (China) Lu Jiaxiang	4–6, 5–7
Win	4.	24 February 2014	ITF Nonthaburi, Thailand	Hard	(Thailand) Nungnadda Wannasuk	(Japan) Miyu Kato (Japan) Yuuki Tanaka	6–2, 6–2
Win	5.	28 April 2014	ITF Bangkok, Thailand	Hard	(Thailand) Nungnadda Wannasuk	(Chinese Taipei) Lee Hua-chen (India) Shweta Rana	1–6, 6–3, [10–8]
Win	6.	5 May 2014	ITF Bangkok, Thailand	Hard	(Thailand) Nungnadda Wannasuk	(Japan) Kyōka Okamura (Japan) Hirono Watanabe	6–2, 7–5
Loss	5.	26 May 2014	ITF Balikpapan, Indonesia	Hard	(Thailand) Varatchaya Wongteanchai	(Japan) Michika Ozeki (Thailand) Peangtarn Plipuech	3–6, 6–4, [7–10]
Win	7.	2 June 2014	ITF Tarakan, Indonesia	Hard (i)	(Thailand) Varatchaya Wongteanchai	(Indonesia) Beatrice Gumulya (Indonesia) Jessy Rompies	5–7, 6–4, [11–9]
Win	8.	7 July 2014	ITF Bangkok, Thailand	Hard	(Thailand) Varatchaya Wongteanchai	(Thailand) Luksika Kumkhum (Thailand) Tamarine Tanasugarn	6–3, 4–6, [10–8]
Loss	6.	13 September 2014	ITF Antalya, Turkey	Hard	(Thailand) Nungnadda Wannasuk	(Japan) Kotomi Takahata (Japan) Akiko Omae	4–6, 2–6
Win	9.	13 October 2014	ITF Bangkok, Thailand	Hard	(Thailand) Varatchaya Wongteanchai	(Czech Republic) Martina Borecká (Netherlands) Lesley Kerkhove	6–2, 5–7, [10–7]
Loss	7.	14 November 2014	Bendigo International, Australia	Hard	(Thailand) Varatchaya Wongteanchai	(Australia) Jessica Moore (Australia) Abbie Myers	6–3, 1–6, [6–10]
Loss	8.	10 January 2015	ITF Hong Kong	Hard	(Thailand) Varatchaya Wongteanchai	(China) Han Xinyun (Chinese Taipei) Hsu Chieh-yu	6–3, 4–6, [8–10]
Win	10.	11 June 2016	ITF Sharm El Sheikh, Egypt	Hard	(India) Shivika Burman	(United Kingdom) Sabrina Bamburac (Sweden) Brenda Njuki	6–3, 6–4
Win	11.	21 October 2016	ITF Hua Hin, Thailand	Hard	(Thailand) Nudnida Luangnam	(Thailand) Chompoothip Jandakate (Thailand) Tamachan Momkoonthod	6–2, 6–7^{(4)}, [10–0]
Win	12.	2 December 2016	ITF Hua Hin, Thailand	Hard	(Thailand) Nudnida Luangnam	(Japan) Mai Hontama (Japan) Yukina Saigo	7–5, 6–3
Win	13.	28 April 2017	ITF Hua Hin, Thailand	Hard	(Thailand) Nudnida Luangnam	(Thailand) Patcharin Cheapchandej (South Korea) Han Sung-hee	7–5, 6–2
Loss	9.	14 July 2017	ITF Hua Hin, Thailand	Hard	(Thailand) Nudnida Luangnam	(Indonesia) Beatrice Gumulya (Indonesia) Jessy Rompies	2–6, 1–6
Win	14.	21 July 2017	ITF Hua Hin, Thailand	Hard	(Thailand) Nudnida Luangnam	(Thailand) Patcharin Cheapchandej (South Korea) Han Sung-hee	6–2, 7–6^{(5)}
Win	15.	11 August 2017	ITF Nonthaburi, Thailand	Hard	(Thailand) Tamachan Momkoonthod	(Australia) Genevieve Lorbergs (Singapore) Stefanie Tan	6–3, 6–4
Loss	10.	18 August 2017	ITF Nonthaburi, Thailand	Hard	(Thailand) Varatchaya Wongteanchai	(Chinese Taipei) Chan Chin-wei (South Korea) Choi Ji-hee	6–2, 1–6, [11–13]
Win	16.	7 October 2017	ITF Nonthaburi, Thailand	Hard	(Thailand) Nudnida Luangnam	(Malta) Elaine Genovese (Finland) Oona Orpana	6–4, 6–4
Loss	11.	13 October 2017	ITF Nonthaburi, Thailand	Hard	(Thailand) Nudnida Luangnam	(Chinese Taipei) Chan Chin-wei (Chinese Taipei) Liang En-shuo	1–6, 4–6
Win	17.	15 December 2017	Pune Championships, India	Hard	(Indonesia) Jessy Rompies	(United Kingdom) Samantha Murray (Montenegro) Ana Veselinović	6–4, 6–2
