= Maria Kirilenko =

Russian tennis player (born 1987)

Maria Kirilenko Мари́я Кириле́нко
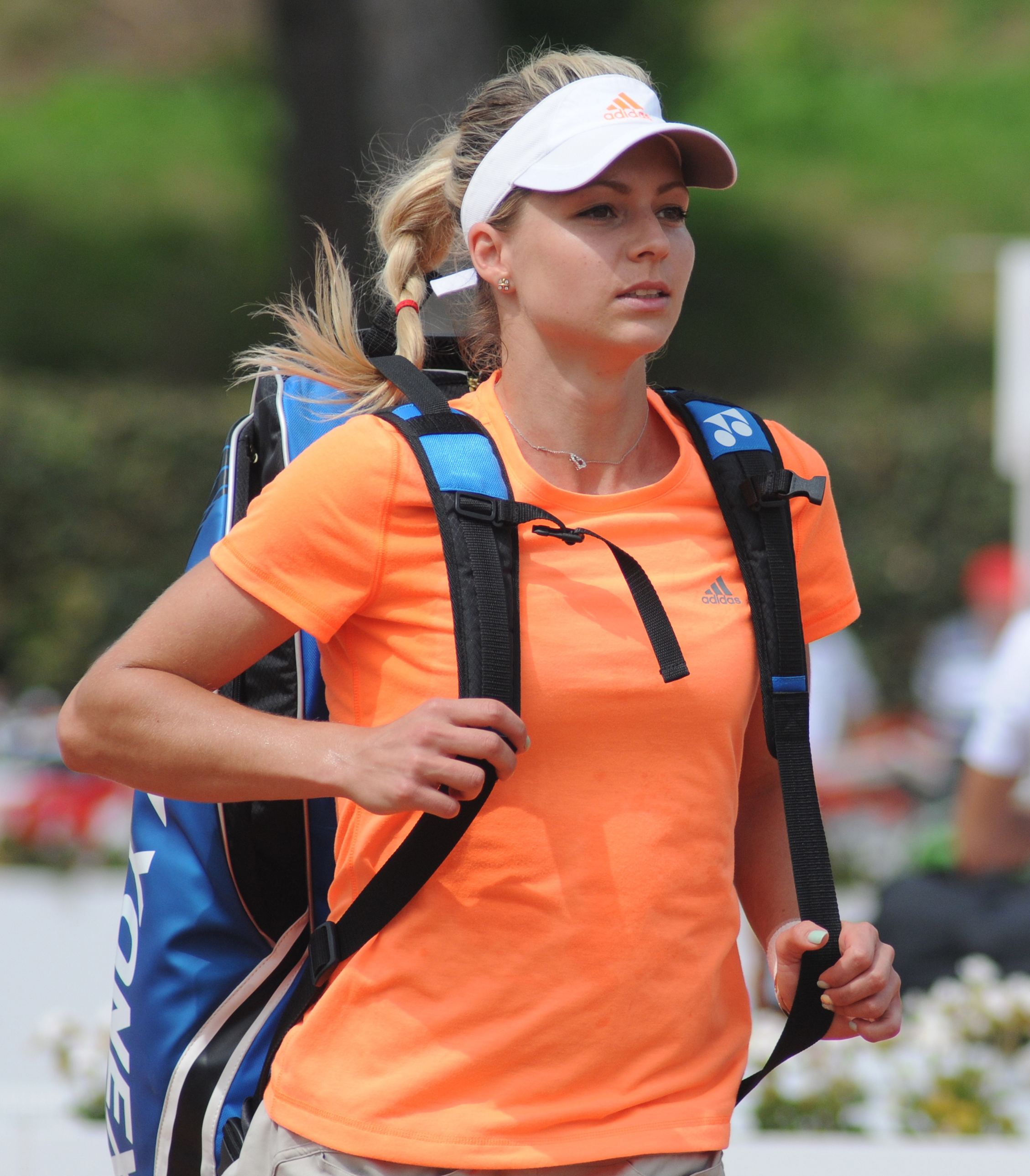
- Kirilenko at the 2014 Italian Open
- Full name: Maria Yuryevna Kirilenko
- Native name: Мари́я Ю́рьевна Кириле́нко
- Country (sports): Russia
- Residence: Moscow, Russia
- Born: 25 January 1987 (age 39) Moscow, Russian SFSR, Soviet Union
- Height: 1.74 m (5 ft 8 1/2 in)
- Turned pro: 2001
- Retired: 2014
- Plays: Right-handed (two-handed backhand)
- Prize money: $6,855,919

Singles
- Career record: 364–257
- Career titles: 6
- Highest ranking: No. 10 (10 June 2013)

Grand Slam singles results
- Australian Open: QF (2010)
- French Open: QF (2013)
- Wimbledon: QF (2012)
- US Open: 4R (2011)

Other tournaments
- Olympic Games: SF – 4th (2012)

Doubles
- Career record: 255–150
- Career titles: 12
- Highest ranking: No. 5 (24 October 2011)

Grand Slam doubles results
- Australian Open: F (2011)
- French Open: F (2012)
- Wimbledon: 3R (2007)
- US Open: SF (2011)

Other doubles tournaments
- Tour Finals: W (2012)

Team competitions
- Fed Cup: 3–4
Medal record
Olympic Games
Bronze medal – third place	2012 London	Doubles

Maria Yuryevna Kirilenko (Russian: Мари́я Ю́рьевна Кириле́нко, IPA: [mɐˈrʲijə kʲɪrʲɪˈlʲenkə]; born 25 January 1987) is a Russian former professional tennis player. A junior Grand Slam champion at the 2002 US Open at the age of 15, she went on to become a top-ten player in both singles and doubles. Kirilenko won six WTA Tour singles titles and 12 doubles titles. She was a three-time major singles quarterfinalist (reaching that stage at the 2010 Australian Open, the 2012 Wimbledon Championships, and the 2013 French Open), a semifinalist at the 2012 London Olympics (where she lost to Victoria Azarenka in the bronze medal match), and reached a career-high ranking of world No. 10, on 10 June 2013. In women's doubles, she became ranked as high as No. 5 in the world on 24 October 2011, and reached two major finals, at the 2011 Australian Open with Azarenka and the 2012 French Open with compatriot Nadia Petrova. Along with Petrova, Kirilenko won the 2012 WTA Tour Championships in doubles and was a bronze medalist at the 2012 London Olympics.

== Tennis career ==
=== Junior career ===
In 2002, Kirilenko won the junior tournaments at the Canadian Open and US Open.

=== Professional career ===
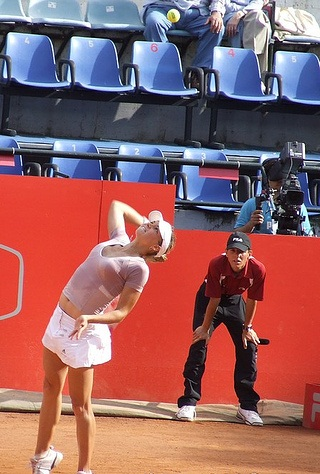
Kirilenko at Roland Garros, 2006

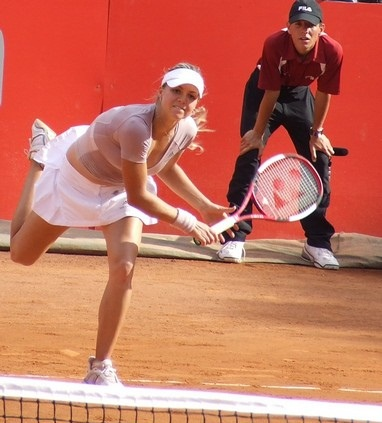
Kirilenko at Roland Garros, 2006

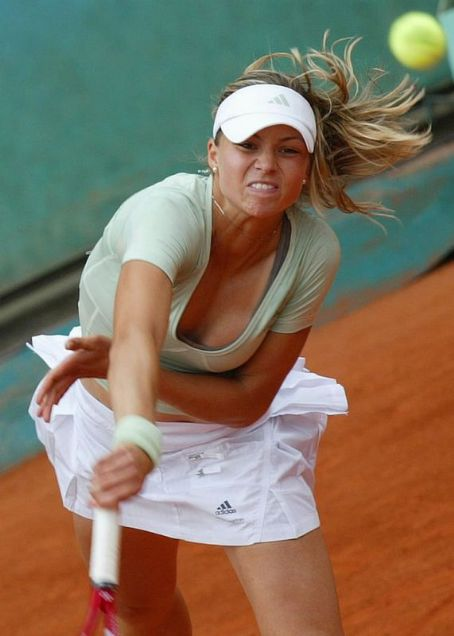
Maria Kirilenko in action

==== 2003–2006 ====
In 2002, Kirilenko started participating in WTA events. She began moving up the rankings in 2004, but was set back by an injury. At the 2004 French Open, Kirilenko took the first set off Serena Williams before losing in three sets. She was the runner-up to Nicole Pratt at the Hyderabad Open.

At the end of 2005, she climbed back up the rankings and won her first title in Beijing. On 12 June 2006, she broke into the world's top 20 for the first time. At the US Open, Kirilenko was seeded 20th and reached the third round, before losing to Aravane Rezaï.

Kirilenko made her debut for Russia at the Fed Cup tournament in April 2006. In the World Group quarterfinal tie against Belgium, she lost her singles match against 2005 US Open champion Kim Clijsters, but partnering with Dinara Safina, won her doubles match against Justine Henin and Clijsters. However, Russia ended up losing, 2–3.

==== 2007 ====
In January 2007, she advanced to the third round of the Australian Open, before being defeated by third seed Svetlana Kuznetsova. She then competed in the Pan Pacific Open in Tokyo, where she advanced to the second round, upsetting world No. 15 Shahar Pe'er of Israel, before being defeated by Ai Sugiyama. She then competed in the Dubai Tennis Championships, where she reached the second round, before losing in a close match to Daniela Hantuchová.

At the San Diego Open in California, Kirilenko upset second seeded Jelena Janković to advance to the quarterfinals, before losing to fellow Russian Elena Dementieva. At the Stanford Classic in Los Angeles, she upset sixth seed Marion Bartoli in straight sets before losing to eventual champion Ana Ivanovic in the quarterfinals.

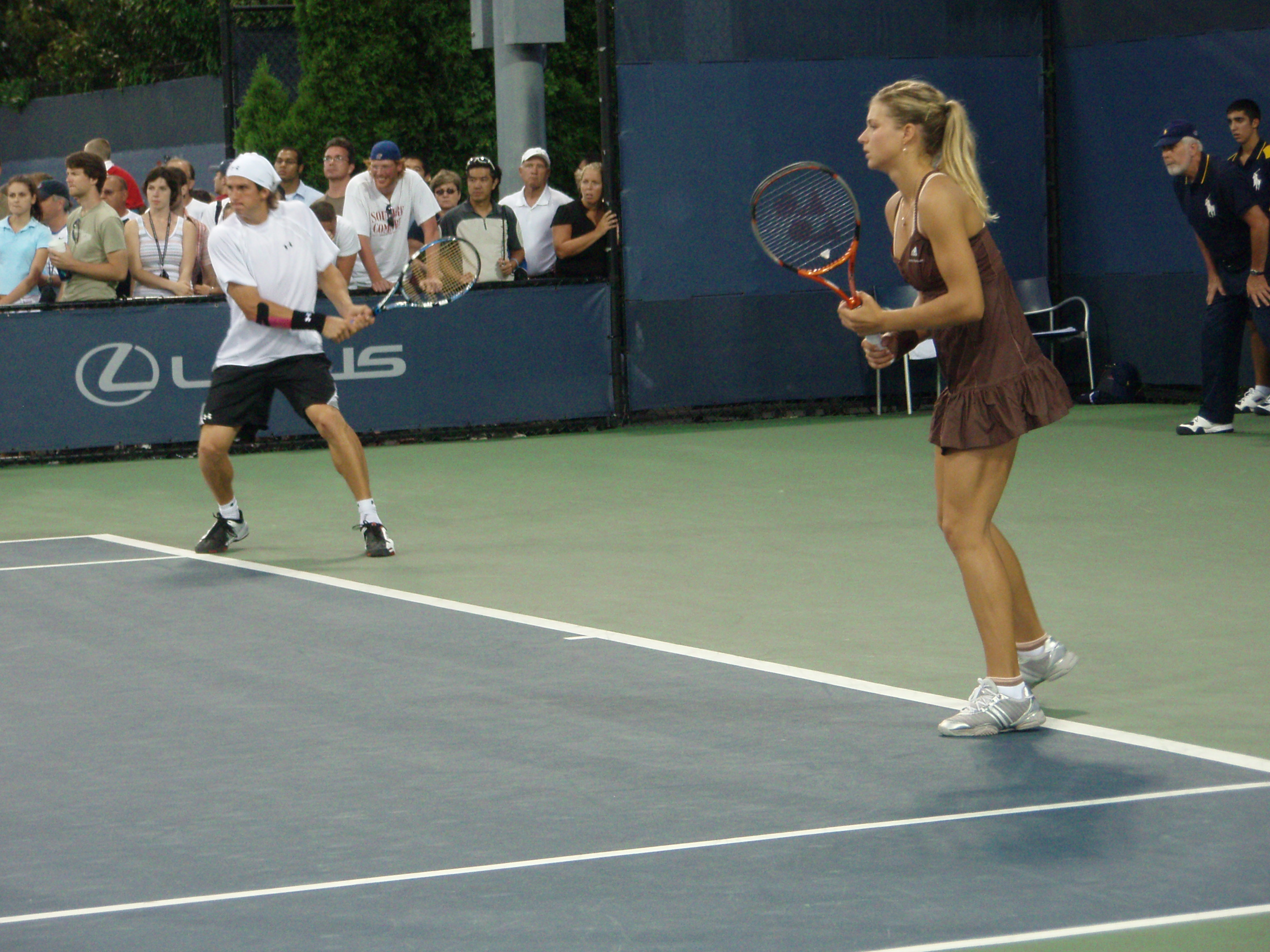
Kirilenko with mixed-doubles partner Igor Andreev at the US Open

Unseeded at the US Open, she defeated Martina Müller and 22nd seed Katarina Srebotnik. She then lost to unseeded Julia Vakulenko. After the US Open, she appeared in the Sunfeast Open. There, Kirilenko won her second WTA Tour singles title, defeating unseeded Mariya Koryttseva in straight sets. The next week at a tournament in Seoul, Kirilenko, as the fourth seed also reached the finals, but lost to top seed Venus Williams.

==== 2008 ====
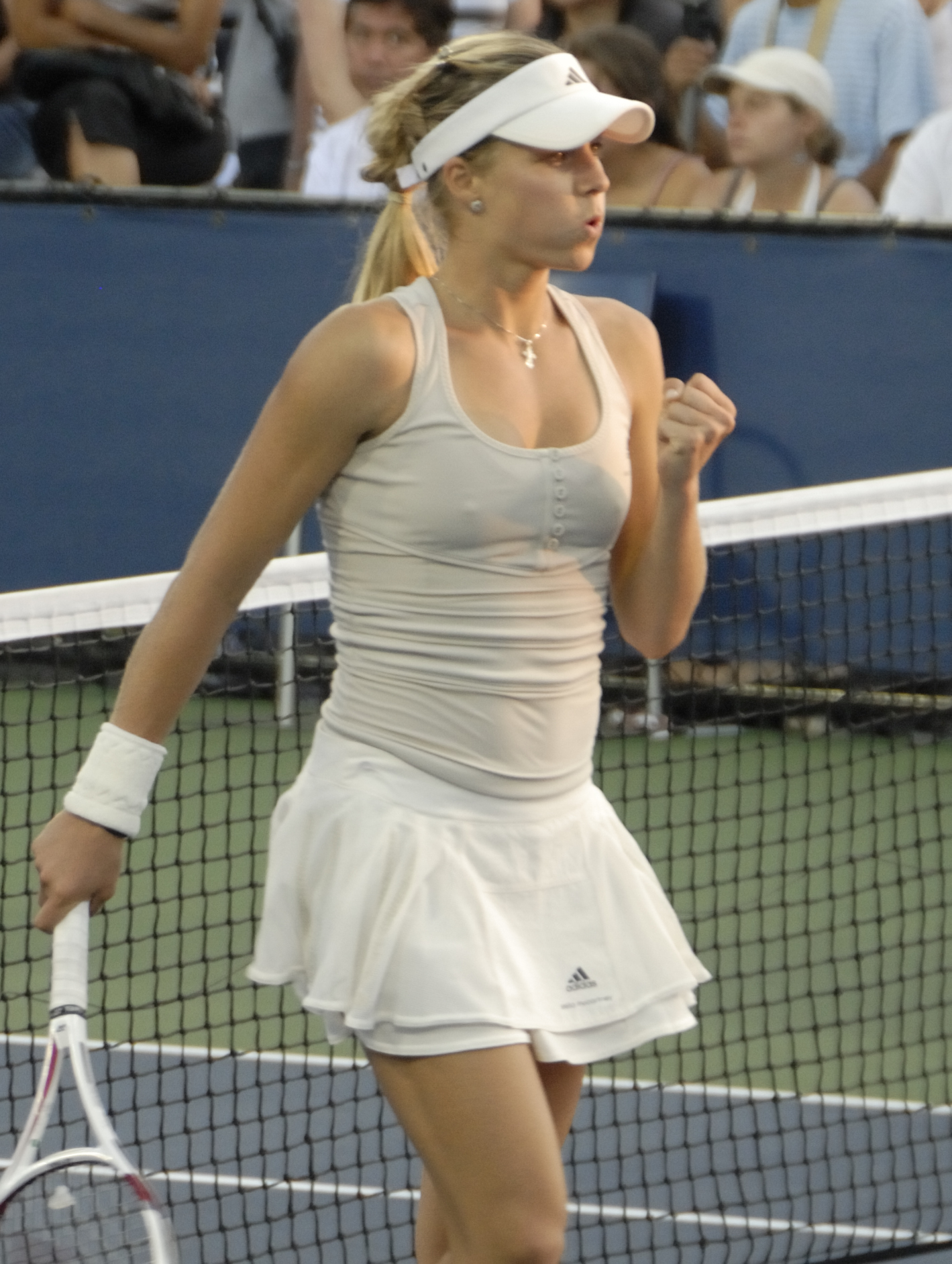
Kirilenko at the 2008 US Open

At the Australian Open, Kirilenko reached the fourth round of a Grand Slam tournament for the first time in her career, beating sixth seed Anna Chakvetadze. Her next opponent was Daniela Hantuchová, to whom she lost, 6–1, 4–6, 4–6, after leading 6–1, 3–1.

Kirilenko then reached the second round of a Tier-I event in Doha, beating Ekaterina Makarova, before losing to Anabel Medina Garrigues in three sets. Kirilenko then lost four matches in a row at Dubai, Bangalore, Indian Wells, and Miami. However, as the second seed, she reached the final of a Tier-IV event at Estoril, where she defeated Iveta Benešová in straight sets. She also won the doubles title there, partnering with Flavia Pennetta. Kirilenko also won in Barcelona, defeating Martinez-Sanchez for her fourth career title and the second of the year.

Kirilenko played at the Tier-III tournament in Cincinnati in August, where she was third seed. She reached the semifinals, where she lost to eventual champion Nadia Petrova. She partnered with Petrova as the second-seed doubles team and beat the top-seed pair of Hsieh Su-wei and Yaroslava Shvedova in the finals.

==== 2009 ====
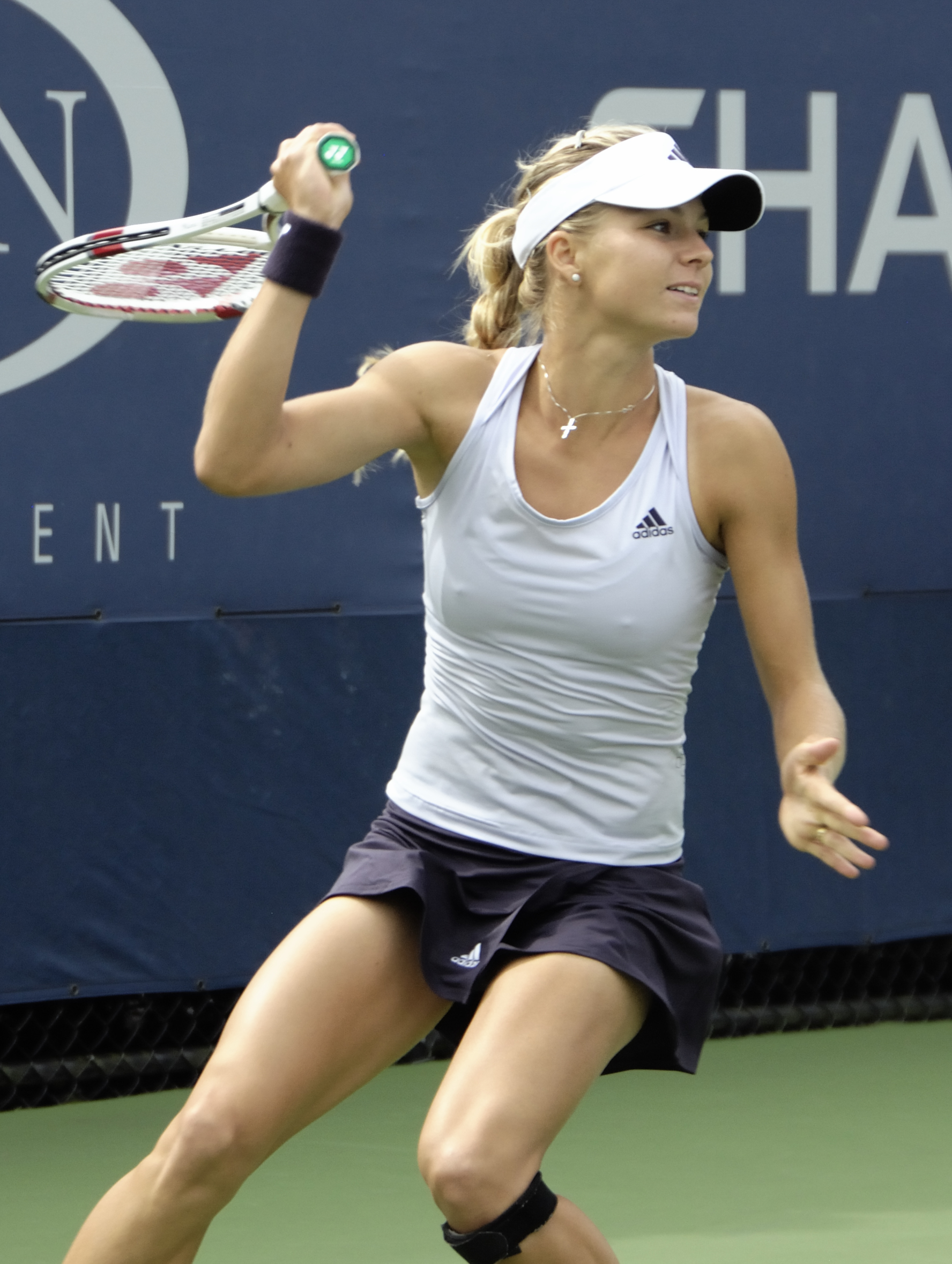
Kirilenko at the 2009 US Open

Kirilenko was seeded 27th at the Australian Open, but lost to future top five player Sara Errani in the first round.

In the Dubai doubles tournament, Kirilenko partnered with Agnieszka Radwańska, and even though they were unseeded, they reached the final, eventually losing to Liezel Huber and Cara Black, the world No. 1 doubles pairing at that time.

At the 2009 French Open, Kirilenko was unseeded in the singles tournament, and lost to Olivia Rogowska of Australia in the first round. In the doubles tournament, Kirilenko and doubles partner Flavia Pennetta of Italy were seeded eighth. They made it to the third round, before losing to 11th seeded Anna-Lena Grönefeld of Germany and Patty Schnyder of Switzerland.

Kirilenko was unseeded at Wimbledon and made it to the second round, losing to ninth seeded Caroline Wozniacki.

At the US Open, she made it to the third round, defeating her doubles partner Radwańska before losing to Li Na. She then competed in the Korea Open in Seoul, where she was the defending champion, but lost in the semifinals to eventual champion Kimiko Date-Krumm.

==== 2010: First Grand Slam quarterfinal ====
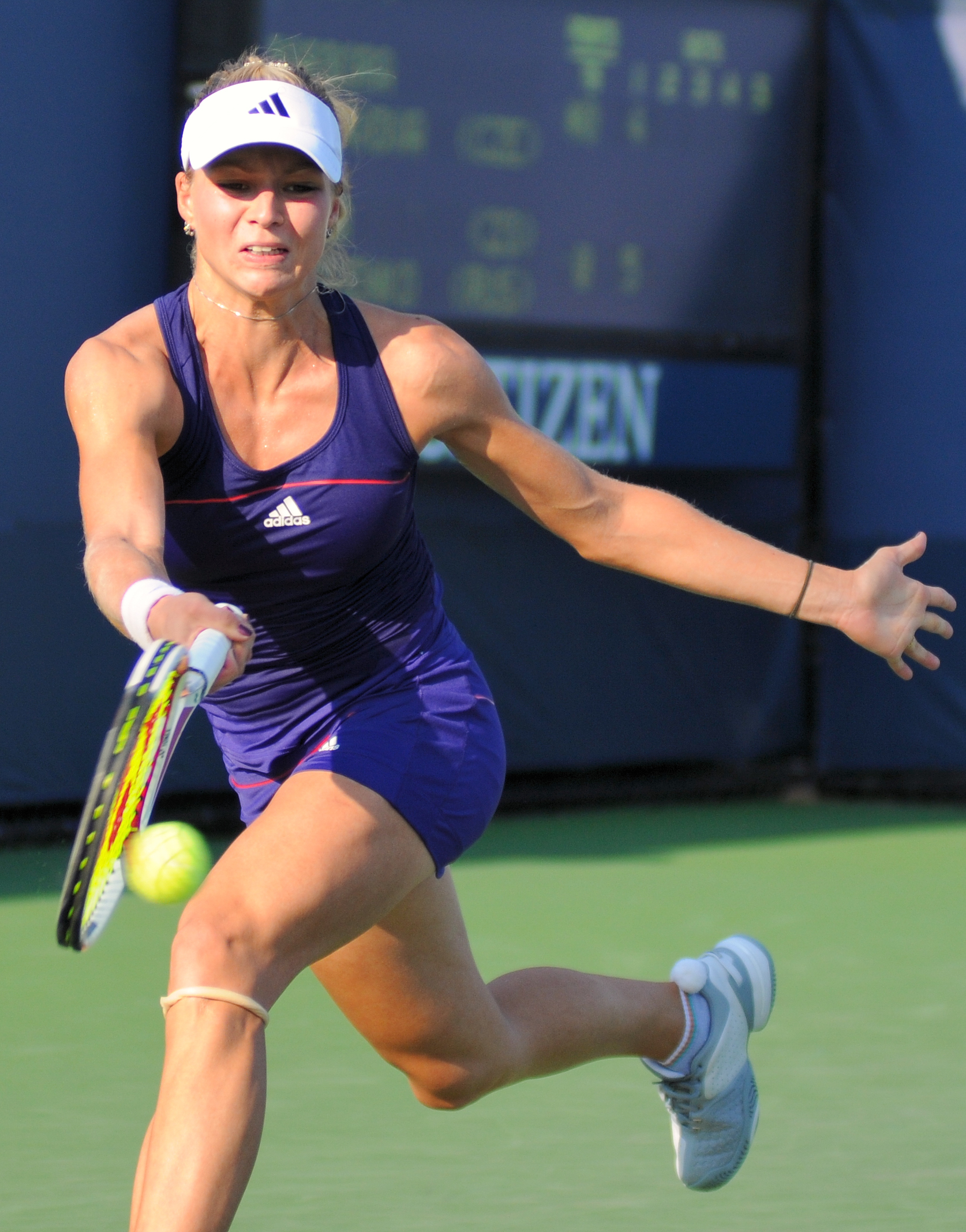
Kirilenko at the 2010 US Open

Kirilenko began the year by competing in the Auckland Open, where she reached the quarterfinals but lost to Shahar Pe'er. With a ranking at that time of No. 58, Kirilenko was unseeded at the Australian Open, where in the first round she upset her friend, former doubles partner, 2008 champion and 14th seed Maria Sharapova, 7–6, 3–6, 6–4, in a 3-hour 22-minute marathon. It was the second-longest women's match in Australian Open history (only behind the 2011 fourth-round match between Francesca Schiavone and Svetlana Kuznetsova). She advanced to the quarterfinals, losing to Zheng Jie, who was also unseeded for this tournament. In the doubles portion, she and her partner, Agnieszka Radwańska, were seeded 15th and advanced to the semifinals, losing there to the world No. 1 pairing of Cara Black and Liezel Huber in three sets.

Kirilenko entered as 32nd seed at the Indian Wells Open, and made it to the third round, losing there to second seeded Caroline Wozniacki. In Miami, she advanced as 32nd seed like Indian Wells to the third round, again losing to Wozniacki.

Kirilenko played in Rome at the Italian Open where she was unseeded. She lost in the quarterfinals to world No. 1, Serena Williams.

Kirilenko entered as 30th seed the French Open where she advanced to the round of 16 for the first time in her career, before losing to 17th seed and eventual champion Francesca Schiavone, having defeated defending champion Svetlana Kuznetsova en route. In the doubles draw, Kirilenko and Radwańska were seeded 11th. They reached the quarterfinals, before losing to the eventual champions Serena and Venus Williams in straight sets.

At Wimbledon, she was 27th seed in the singles draw, and lost in the third round to eighth seed Kim Clijsters. Kirilenko also paired up with Agnieszka Radwańska in the doubles draw, where they were seeded No. 10.

Kirilenko made the quarterfinals of the Stanford Classic in California, before losing to Radwańska. She entered in the doubles tournament with Victoria Azarenka, they ended in the semifinals.

She then reached the second rounds of Western & Southern Open and the Rogers Cup, losing to Vera Zvonareva and Victoria Azarenka, respectively. At the Pilot Pen Tennis, she reached the semifinals, losing to Nadia Petrova.

She reached the third round of the US Open losing to 11th seed Svetlana Kuznetsova.

She then reached the second rounds of Korea Open, losing to former world No. 1, Dinara Safina, and Pan Pacific Open, losing to Flavia Pennetta. At the last Premier-Mandatory event of the year, the China Open, she lost in the third round to eventual finalist and compatriot Vera Zvonareva. In the Japan Women's Open, she retired in the second round due to a hip injury against Chang Kai-chen, after losing the first set 4–6. Kirilenko reached the final of the Kremlin Cup where she fell to Victoria Azarenka.

Kirilenko ended the 2010 season ranked No. 20 in the world.

==== 2011: Steady ranking ====
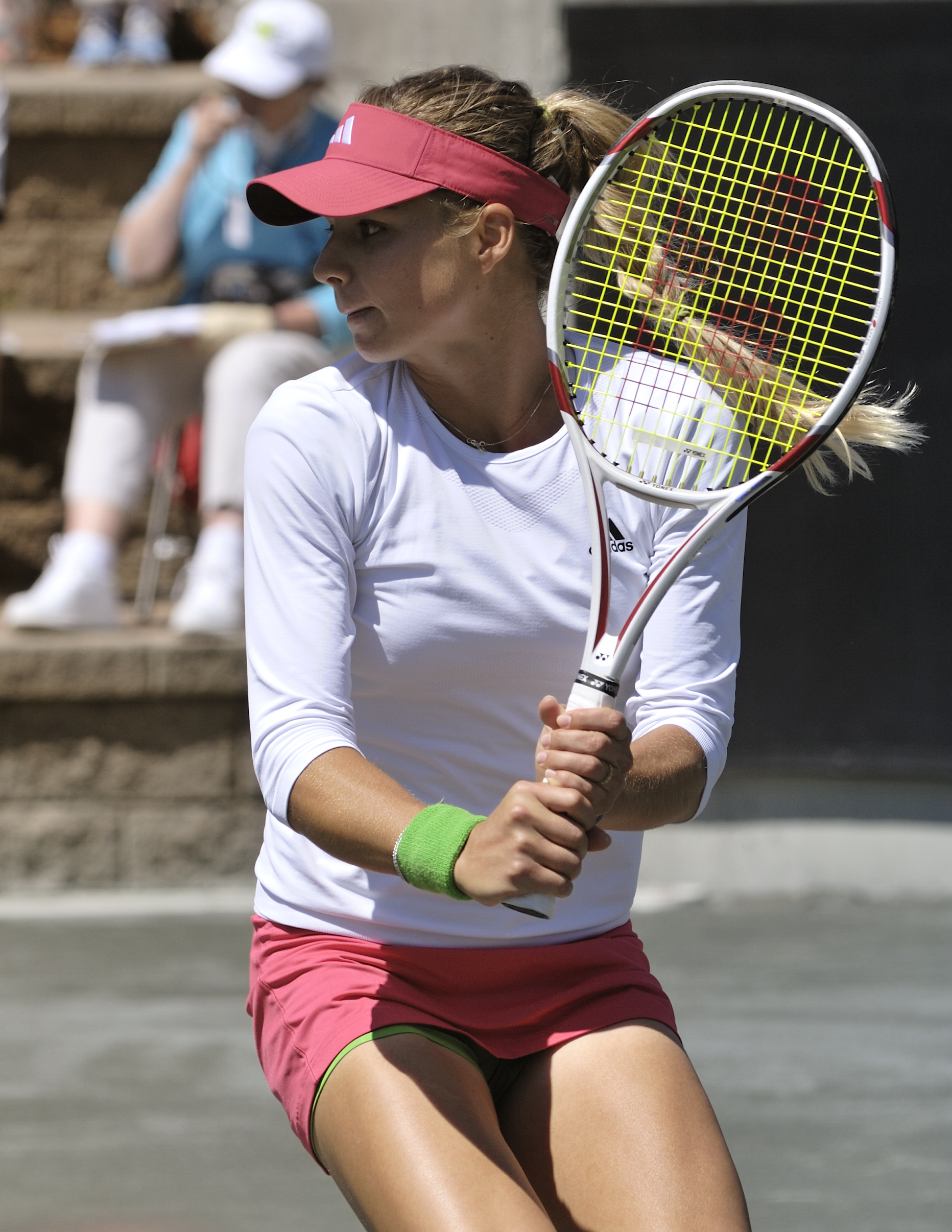
Kirilenko at the 2011 Family Circle Cup

She competed at the Hong Kong Tennis Classic and won the Gold Group Championship with her compatriots Vera Zvonareva and Yevgeny Kafelnikov. At the Australian Open, she failed to defend her quarterfinal points by being knocked out in the second round. However, in the doubles competition, she reached the final, partnered with Victoria Azarenka, but lost to Pennetta and Dulko. She then fell early in the Pattaya Open and Dubai Tennis Championships. She then reached the third round of both Indian Wells Open and Miami Open losing to Agnieszka Radwańska on both occasions. She then suffered three losses in a row in the second round of Family Circle Cup, and the first rounds of Madrid Open and Italian Open. However, she won doubles at the Mutua Madrid Open with Victoria Azarenka. At the French Open, she reached the fourth round losing to Andrea Petkovic in three sets.

She then fell in the first round of Rosmalen Open to Kimiko Date-Krumm, However, she rebounded by reaching the third round of the Wimbledon Championships, eventually being stopped by the seventh-seeded Serena Williams. She then failed to win back-to-back matches falling in the second rounds of Stanford Classic, Southern California Open, first round of Rogers Cup, and the second rounds of Western & Southern Open. She then rebounded at the US Open, losing to eventual champion Samantha Stosur 2–6, 7–6^{15–17}, 3–6 in the fourth round. The second set tie-break score of 15–17 was the longest in any major in the history of women's tennis.

She reached her first semifinal of the year at the Guangzhou International Open, losing to Chanelle Scheepers 5–7, 7–5, 4–6. She then played at the Pan Pacific Open and the China Open, where she defeated Samantha Stosur in three sets in both occasions in the second round; she also fell in the quarterfinals on both events losing to Vera Zvonareva and Monica Niculescu, respectively. She played her last tournament of the year at the Luxembourg Open, where she had to withdraw in the second round due to an ankle injury.

==== 2012: 4th place at 2012 Olympics ====
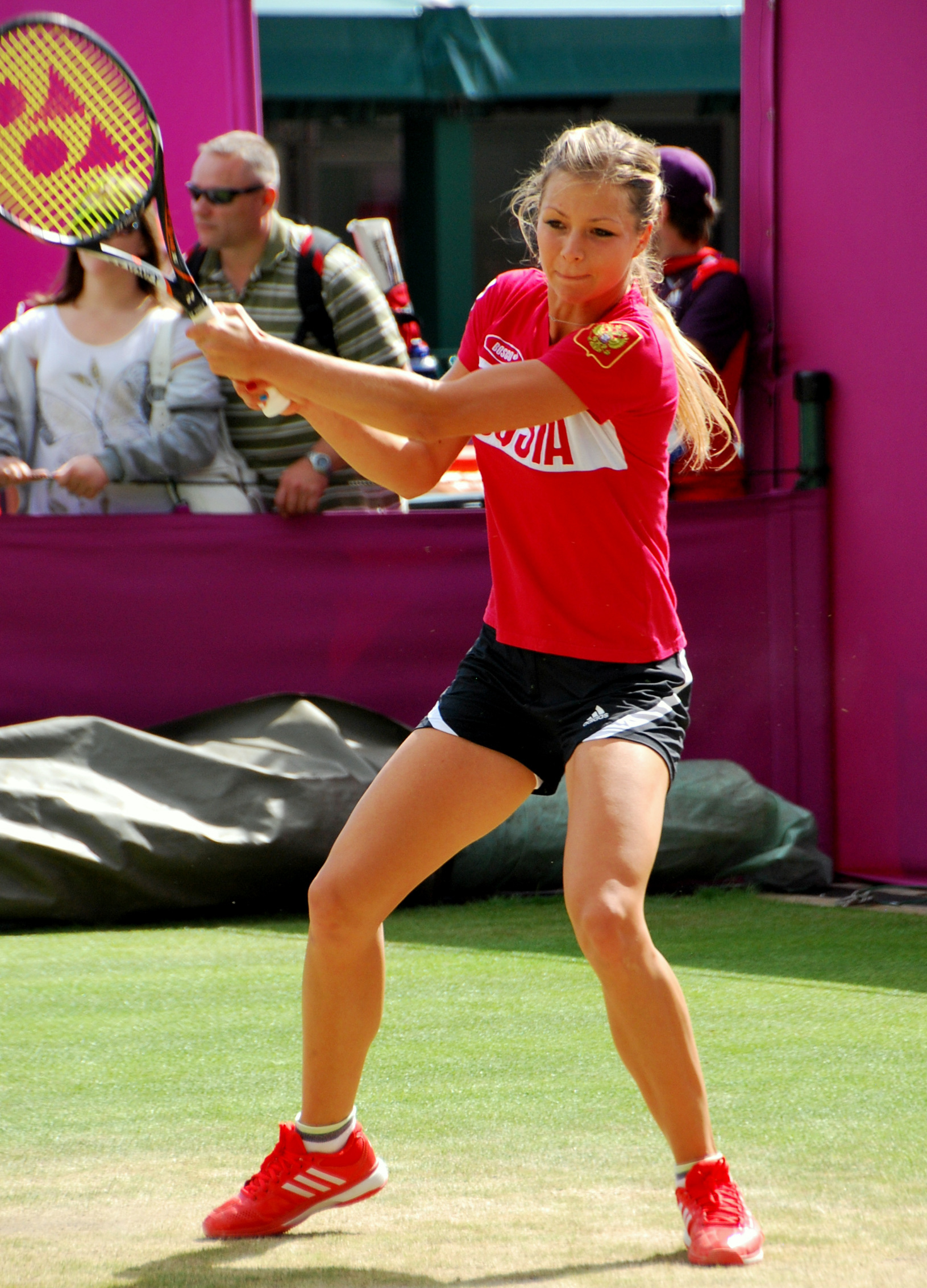
Kirilenko on the practice court at the 2012 Summer Olympics

Kirilenko began her 2012 season at the Sydney International. She lost in the second round of qualifying to Sofia Arvidsson. Seeded 27th at the Australian Open, Kirilenko retired during her third-round match against second seed Petra Kvitová due to an upper left leg injury.

Seeded fourth at the Pattaya Open, Kirilenko reached the final where she was defeated by third seed Daniela Hantuchová. In Doha at the Qatar Ladies Open, Kirilenko lost in the second round to 14th seed Svetlana Kuznetsova. At the Dubai Championships, Kirilenko was defeated in the second round by Ana Ivanovic. Seeded 20th at Indian Wells, Kirilenko advanced to the quarterfinal where she lost to second seed Maria Sharapova. Seeded 22nd at the Miami Open, Kirilenko was defeated in the fourth round by seventh seed Marion Bartoli.

Kirilenko began her clay-court season at the Estoril Open. Seeded second, she lost in the second round to qualifier Karin Knapp. Seeded 16th at the Madrid Open, Kirilenko was defeated in the second round by Ekaterina Makarova. Seeded 16th in Rome at the Italian Open, she lost in the first round to Flavia Pennetta. Seeded third at the Internationaux de Strasbourg, Kirilenko retired during her first-round match against Sloane Stephens due to a right ankle injury. Seeded 16th at the French Open, she was defeated in the second round by Klára Zakopalová.

Kirilenko played only one tournament before Wimbledon which was the Rosmalen Open. Seeded fifth, she lost in the first round to Francesca Schiavone. Kirilenko then played at the Wimbledon Championships where she was the 17th seed. She had sudden success reaching the round of 16 for the first time with easy wins over Alexandra Cadanțu, Lourdes Domínguez Lino and Sorana Cîrstea. Kirilenko had officially reached the second week of all four majors. She defeated 30th seed Peng Shuai to reach her second Grand Slam quarterfinal and her first at Wimbledon. After almost three hours of play, three rain delays and switching courts, she eventually lost in a very close and tough quarterfinal to third seed and eventual finalist Agnieszka Radwańska.

Playing for Russia at the Summer Olympics, Kirilenko reached the semifinal upsetting sixth seed Petra Kvitová in her quarterfinal match. She lost the semifinal match to eventual silver medalist Maria Sharapova. Despite the loss, she still had a chance to win a medal. In the bronze medal match, she was defeated by Victoria Azarenka to end on fourth place. However, she won a bronze medal in women's doubles with Nadia Petrova by beating the No. 1 ranked team of Liezel Huber/Lisa Raymond.

Kirilenko started her preparation for the US Open at the Western & Southern Open in Cincinnati. Seeded 12th, she lost in the first round to Venus Williams. She bounced back into form at the Premier level New Haven Open at Yale. Seeded seventh, Kirilenko reached her second final of the year where she was defeated by second seed Petra Kvitová. Seeded 14th at the US Open, Kirilenko suffered a third-round upset at the hands of Andrea Hlaváčková. In doubles, Kirilenko and Petrova upset the Williams sisters in the third round before losing in the quarterfinal to eighth seeds Nuria Llagostera Vives and María José Martínez Sánchez.

Seeded second at the Korea Open, Kirilenko retired from her first-round match against Lee So-ra due to a back injury. Competing as the 13th seed at the China Open, Kirilenko lost in the first round to Ekaterina Makarova. Seeded seventh at the Kremlin Cup, Kirilenko was defeated in the semifinal by Sofia Arvidsson. Seeded third at the Tournament of Champions, she lost her first match to second seed Nadia Petrova, but she won her second one over eighth seed Tsvetana Pironkova. She withdrew from her third match against sixth seed Jie Zheng due to an upper respiratory illness. Kirilenko played her final tournament of the season at the WTA Tour Championships. She and Petrova won the doubles title beating Andrea Hlaváčková/Lucie Hradecká in the final.

Kirilenko ended the year ranked 14 in singles and No. 7 in doubles.

==== 2013: World No. 10 & injuries ====
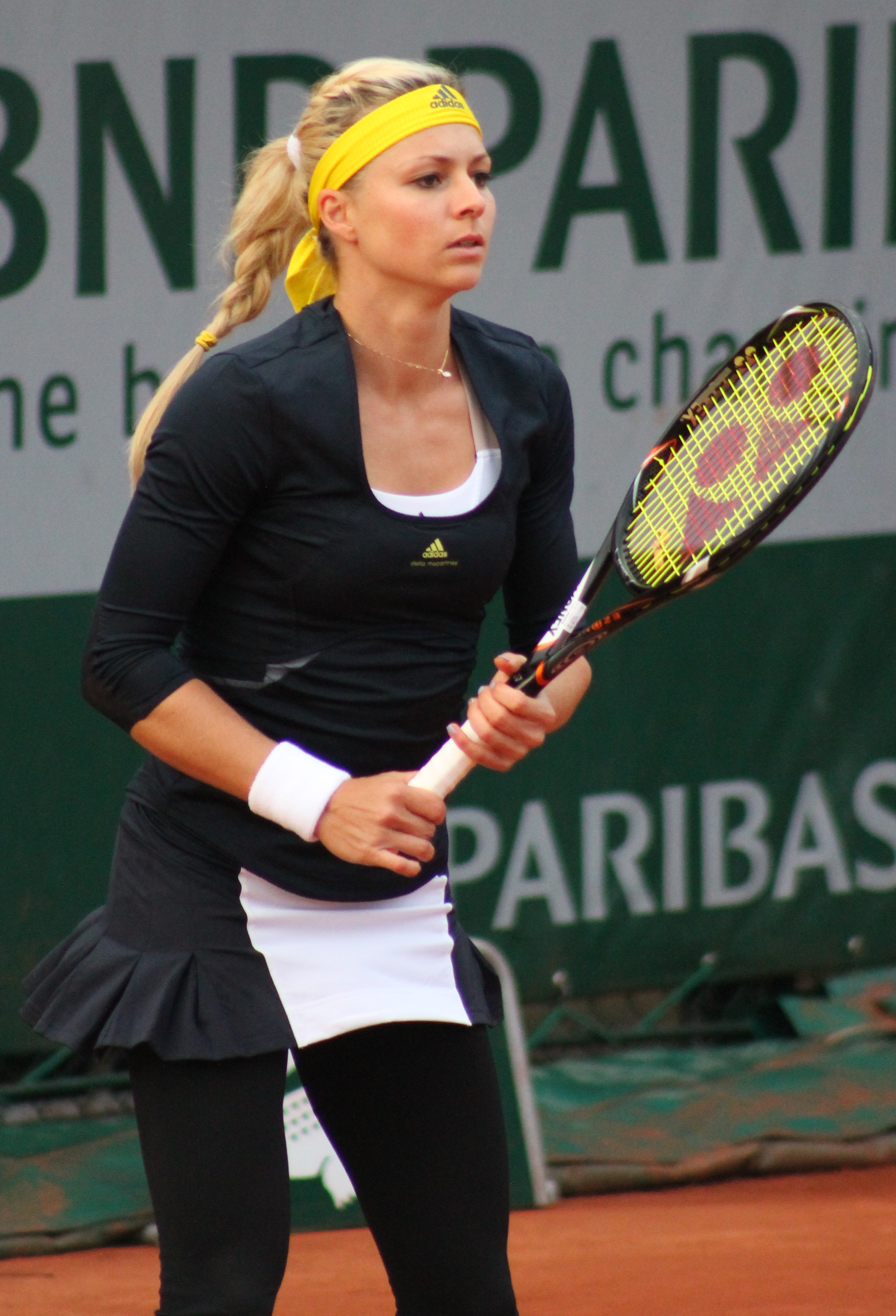
Kirilenko at the 2013 French Open

Beginning her season at the Sydney International, Kirilenko lost in the second round to third seed Sara Errani. Seeded 14th at the Australian Open, Kirilenko made it to the fourth round where she lost to third seed Serena Williams.

Seeded second at the Pattaya Open, Kirilenko won the tournament defeating fifth seed Sabine Lisicki in the final. During the Fed Cup tie versus Japan, Kirilenko played one match and beat Kimiko Date-Krumm. Russia won the tie 3-2 to advance to the semifinal. Seeded 12th at the Qatar Ladies Open, Kirilenko retired from her first-round match versus qualifier Ekaterina Bychkova due to a shoulder injury. Seeded 13th at the Indian Wells Open, Kirilenko reached the semifinal after wins over Christina McHale, qualifier Mallory Burdette, third seed Agnieszka Radwańska, and fifth seed Petra Kvitová. She was defeated in her semifinal match by second seed and eventual champion Maria Sharapova. Seeded 14th at Miami, Kirilenko lost in the third round to 21st seed Klára Zakopalová. Seeded third in Mexico at the Monterrey Open, Kirilenko made it to the semifinal where she was defeated by top seed and eventual finalist, Angelique Kerber. In the Fed Cup semifinal tie versus Slovakia, Kirilenko lost her first match to Daniela Hantuchová but beat Dominika Cibulková in her final match. Russia won 3-2 to advance to the final in November versus Italy.

Kirilenko began her preparation for the French Open at the Madrid Open. Seeded 13th, she was defeated in the third round by top seed, defending champion, and eventual champion Serena Williams. Seeded 12th at the Italian Open, Kirilenko retired during her third-round match against seventh seed Sara Errani due to a left knee injury. Seeded 12th at the French Open, Kirilenko defeated Nina Bratchikova, Ashleigh Barty to advance to the third round where she defeated Stefanie Vögele. In the fourth round, she defeated Bethanie Mattek-Sands to reach her first quarterfinal at the French Open. She subsequently lost her quarterfinal match to her former doubles partner and third seed Victoria Azarenka. Her run in Paris catapulted her into the top 10 for the first time.

Seeded sixth at the Eastbourne International, Kirilenko was suffering from a knee injury, but she still made it through to the quarterfinal where she was defeated by Yanina Wickmayer. Seeded tenth at the Wimbledon Championships, Kirilenko suffered a first-round upset at the hands of home crowd favorite Laura Robson. As a result, Kirilenko dropped to No. 12 in the world rankings due to the fact that she was defending a quarterfinal appearance from 2012.

Kirilenko started US Open Series at the Rogers Cup seeded 11th, and lost in the second round to Alizé Cornet. Seeded sixteenth at the Western & Southern Open, Kirilenko was defeated in the second round by Mona Barthel. Seeded 14th at the US Open, Kirilenko lost in the third round to twenty-first seed Simona Halep.

Kirilenko started the Asian swing at the Korea Open. Seeded second, she was defeated in the second round by Kimiko Date-Krumm. In Beijing at the China Open, Kirilenko lost in the third round to top seed and eventual champion Serena Williams. Seeded third at the Kremlin Cup, Kirilenko was defeated in the second round by Anastasia Pavlyuchenkova. Injury ended her season at the Tournament of Champions in Sofia with a 0–5 retirement loss to Alizé Cornet.

Kirilenko ended the year ranked 19.

==== 2014: Last season ====
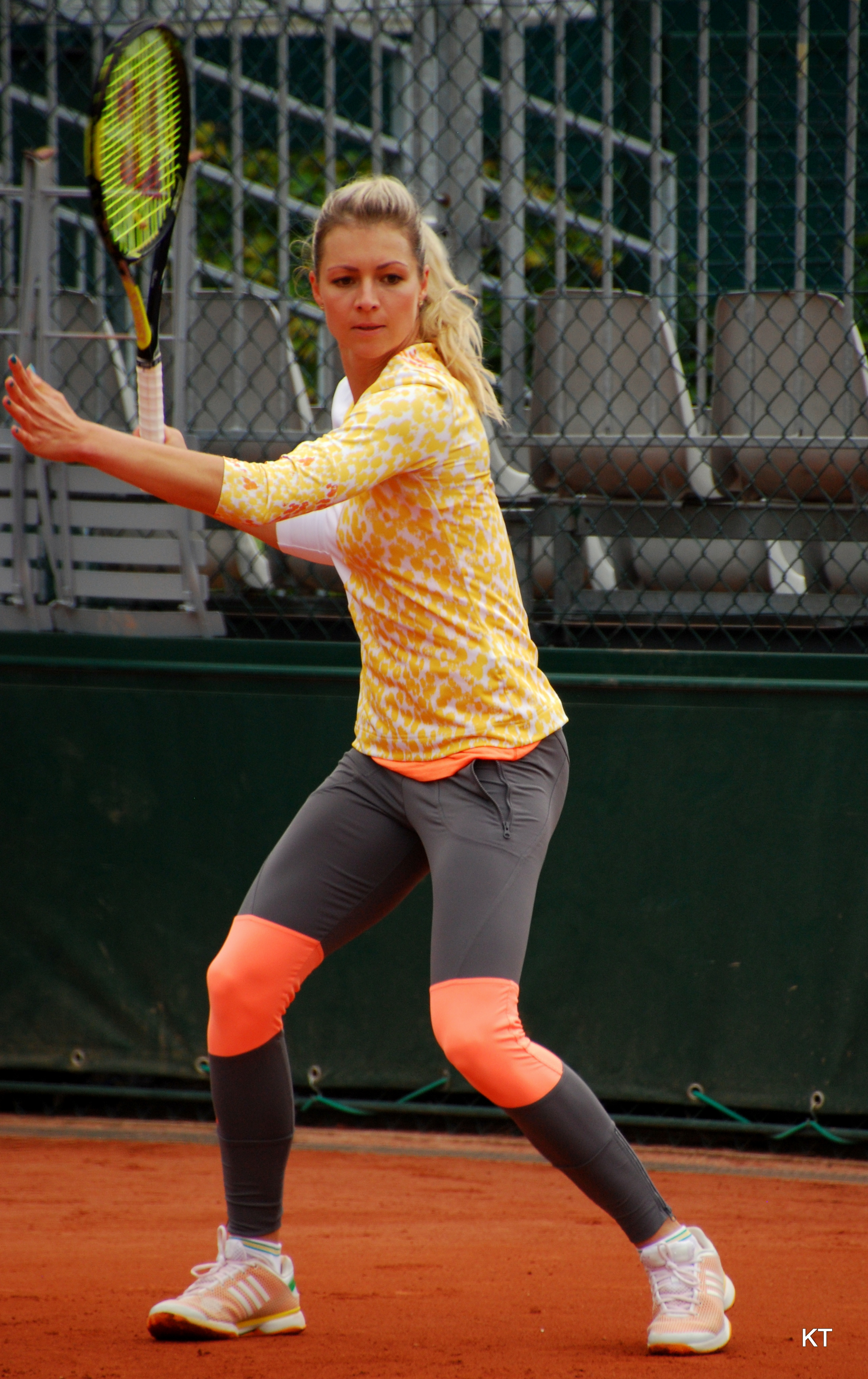
Kirilenko practicing at the 2014 French Open

Kirilenko was not listed on any entry lists for 2014 tournaments, still recovering from the knee injury suffered in the Tournament of Champions in Sofia. She also missed the Australian Open due to the injury.

After missing the pair of Premier Mandatory events at Indian Wells and Miami, Kirilenko made her comeback at the Family Circle Cup in Charleston. Seeded tenth, she was upset in the first round by qualifier Belinda Bencic, who eventually reached her first tour semifinal. At the Madrid Open, Kirilenko defeated qualifier Kristina Mladenovic in the first round to recorded her first victory of the year. She withdrew from her second-round match against qualifier Caroline Garcia due to a left wrist injury. In Rome at the Italian Open, Kirilenko lost to Svetlana Kuznetsova in the first round. Kirilenko exited in the first round at the French Open, winning three games against Johanna Larsson. As a result, her ranking plunged 44 places down to 88, after failing to defend quarterfinal points.

Kirilenko played the pre-Wimbledon tournament in the Netherlands at the Rosmalen Open but lost to Mona Barthel in the first round. Kirilenko entered the Wimbledon Championships ranked 109, her lowest ranking in five years. She caused an upset by defeating 18th seed and the previous year's quarterfinalist, Sloane Stephens, in the first round before she was defeated in the second by Peng Shuai.

After a month-long break, Kirilenko entered the US Open unseeded and drew fifth seed and 2006 champion Maria Sharapova in the first round. She lost the match in straight sets.

In Seoul at the Korea Open, Kirilenko participated as a wildcard. She reached her first quarterfinal in 15 months by defeating Donna Vekić and third seed Klára Koukalová in her first two matches. She then defeated sixth seed Kaia Kanepi for a place in the semifinals. Her run came to an end in the hands of second seed and eventual champion, Karolína Plíšková. Kirilenko played her final tournament of the season at the China Open where she was defeated in the first round by qualifier Tsvetana Pironkova.

Kirilenko ended the year ranked 186.

==== 2015–present ====
Between 2015 and 2017, Kirilenko gave birth to two children, and has since not returned to professional tennis. She has not competed professionally since 2014.

== Fashion ==
In 2006, Kirilenko was selected to be the face of Adidas tennis gear designed by noted British fashion designer Stella McCartney and played exclusively in it for three years. In 2009, she was replaced by Caroline Wozniacki following the US Open.

She appeared in the 2009 Sports Illustrated Swimsuit Edition alongside Daniela Hantuchová and Tatiana Golovin in a pictorial entitled "Volley of the Dolls".

== Personal life ==
Kirilenko dated fellow Russian tennis player Igor Andreev for several years. They split in 2011.

In November 2011, Russian ice hockey player Alexander Ovechkin of the Washington Capitals identified Kirilenko as his girlfriend on his Twitter account. On 31 December 2012, Ovechkin confirmed rumors that he and Kirilenko were engaged. In July 2014, she called off her planned wedding saying in comments distributed by the Russian Tennis Federation that there were "a lot of reasons" behind her decision. Ovechkin had faced questions from Russian media about the relationship when he did not accompany Kirilenko to Wimbledon in June.

On 24 January 2015, Kirilenko married Alexei Stepanov, reported to be the head of the Committee of Public Services in Moscow.

In July 2015, Kirilenko gave birth to a son. In 2017, she gave birth to a daughter.

== Career statistics ==
=== Grand Slam performance timelines ===
Key
W	F	SF	QF	#R	RR	Q#	DNQ	A	NH

(W) winner; (F) finalist; (SF) semifinalist; (QF) quarterfinalist; (#R) rounds 4, 3, 2, 1; (RR) round-robin stage; (Q#) qualification round; (DNQ) did not qualify; (A) absent; (NH) not held; (SR) strike rate (events won / competed); (W–L) win–loss record.

==== Singles ====
Tournament	2002	2003	2004	2005	2006	2007	2008	2009	2010	2011	2012	2013	2014	W–L
Australian Open	A	A	A	2R	3R	3R	4R	1R	QF	2R	3R	4R	A	18–9
French Open	A	A	2R	1R	3R	2R	2R	1R	4R	4R	2R	QF	1R	16–11
Wimbledon	A	A	1R	2R	1R	1R	1R	2R	3R	3R	QF	1R	2R	11–11
US Open	A	3R	2R	2R	3R	3R	1R	3R	3R	4R	3R	3R	1R	19–12
Win–loss	0–0	2–1	2–3	3–4	6–4	5–4	4–4	3–4	11–4	9–4	9–4	9–4	1–3	64–43

==== Doubles ====
Tournament	2002	2003	2004	2005	2006	2007	2008	2009	2010	2011	2012	2013	2014	W–L
Australian Open	A	A	A	1R	QF	3R	1R	3R	SF	F	3R	2R	A	19–9
French Open	A	A	A	2R	3R	1R	2R	3R	QF	QF	F	A	1R	17–9
Wimbledon	A	A	A	A	1R	3R	2R	1R	2R	1R	2R	2R	A	6–8
US Open	A	A	A	3R	3R	1R	1R	QF	3R	SF	QF	A	A	15–8
Win–loss	0–0	0–0	0–0	3–3	7–4	4–4	2–4	7–4	10–4	11–4	11–4	2–2	0–1	57–34
