= 2009 Pattaya Women's Open – Singles =

Singles
- 2009 Pattaya Women's Open

Final
- Champion: (Russia) Vera Zvonareva
- Runner-up: (India) Sania Mirza
- Score: 7–5, 6–1

Details
- Draw: 32
- Seeds: 8

Events
Singles	Doubles
← 2008 ·	Pattaya Women's Open	· 2010 →

Agnieszka Radwańska was the defending champion, but chose to participate in the Open GDF Suez, which was held the same week.

== Seeds ==
1. (Russia) Vera Zvonareva (champion)
2. (Denmark) Caroline Wozniacki (quarterfinals)
3. (Slovakia) Dominika Cibulková (withdrew due to a viral illness)
4. (Austria) Sybille Bammer (second round)
5. (China) Peng Shuai (quarterfinals)
6. (Thailand) Tamarine Tanasugarn (quarterfinals)
7. (Israel) Shahar Pe'er (semifinals)
8. (Slovakia) Magdaléna Rybáriková (semifinals)

== Draw ==
Key

- Q = Qualifier
- WC = Wild card
- LL = Lucky loser
- Alt = Alternate
- ITF = ITF entry
- PR = Protected ranking
- SR = Special ranking
- SE = Special exempt
- JE = Junior exempt
- JR = Junior Accelerator Programme entrant
- CO = College Accelerator Programme entrant
- NG = Next Gen Accelerator Program entrant
- w/o = Walkover
- r = Retired
- d = Defaulted

=== Finals ===
Semifinals
1	(Russia) Vera Zvonareva	6	6
7	(Israel) Shahar Pe'er	1	4
(India) Sania Mirza	6	5	6
8	(Slovakia) Magdaléna Rybáriková	4	7	1

Final
1	(Russia) Vera Zvonareva	7	6
(India) Sania Mirza	5	1

=== Top half ===
First round
1	(Russia) V Zvonareva	6	6
(Slovenia) A Klepač	4	3
(Kazakhstan) Y Shvedova	6	6
(Austria) T Paszek	3	4
(Kazakhstan) G Voskoboeva	4	6	6
(Slovakia) J Groth	6	2	1
(Italy) M Santangelo	6	2	r
5	(China) S Peng	3	5
4	(Austria) S Bammer	6	3	6
(Poland) U Radwańska	4	6	1
(Russia) V Dushevina	6	7
(Russia) E Bovina	4	5
(Russia) A Rodionova	2	2
Q	(Ukraine) Y Beygelzimer	6	6
WC	(Thailand) N Lertcheewakarn	1	0
7	(Israel) S Pe'er	6	6

Second round
1	(Russia) V Zvonareva	6	6
(Kazakhstan) Y Shvedova	4	4
(Kazakhstan) G Voskoboeva	6^{4}	0
5	(China) S Peng	7	6
4	(Austria) S Bammer	4	5
(Russia) V Dushevina	6	7
Q	(Ukraine) Y Beygelzimer	4	1
7	(Israel) S Pe'er	6	6

Quarterfinals
1	(Russia) V Zvonareva	6	6
5	(China) S Peng	2	3
(Russia) V Dushevina	4	6	2
7	(Israel) S Pe'er	6	4	6

Semifinals
1	(Russia) V Zvonareva	6	6
7	(Israel) S Pe'er	1	4

=== Bottom half ===
First round
6	(Thailand) T Tanasugarn	6	7
(Uzbekistan) A Amanmuradova	2	6^{4}
(Australia) J Moore	2	1
(Portugal) N Silva	6	6
(India) S Mirza	7	7
WC	(Thailand) N Lertpitaksinchai	6^{4}	5
Q	(Russia) V Diatchenko	6	1	6
LL	(Japan) R Fuda	3	6	3
8	(Slovakia) M Rybáriková	6	4	6
WC	(Japan) K Date-Krumm	2	6	4
Q	(Kazakhstan) S Karatantcheva	2	6	3
Q	(Croatia) I Lisjak	6	4	6
(Russia) K Pervak	6	6
(Japan) T Yonemura	1	1
(Chinese Taipei) Y-J Chan	3	0
2	(Denmark) C Wozniacki	6	6

Second round
6	(Thailand) T Tanasugarn	6	6
(Portugal) N Silva	3	2
(India) S Mirza	6	6
Q	(Russia) V Diatchenko	4	0
8	(Slovakia) M Rybáriková	6	2	6
Q	(Croatia) I Lisjak	4	6	2
(Russia) K Pervak	7	2	0^{r}
2	(Denmark) C Wozniacki	6^{4}	6	3

Quarterfinals
6	(Thailand) T Tanasugarn	5	4
(India) S Mirza	7	6
8	(Slovakia) M Rybáriková	6	6
2	(Denmark) C Wozniacki	4	1

Semifinals
(India) S Mirza	6	5	6
8	(Slovakia) M Rybáriková	4	7	1
