= 1994 Volvo Women's Open – Singles =

Singles
- 1994 Volvo Women's Open

Final
- Champion: (Belgium) Sabine Appelmans
- Runner-up: (United States) Patty Fendick
- Score: 6–7^{(5–7)}, 7–6^{(7–5)}, 6–2

Details
- Draw: 32 (2WC/4Q)
- Seeds: 8

Events
Singles	Doubles
← 1993 ·	Thailand Open	· 1995 →

Yayuk Basuki was the defending champion, but lost in the first round to Nicole Arendt.

Sabine Appelmans won the title by defeating Patty Fendick 6–7^{(5–7)}, 7–6^{(7–5)}, 6–2 in the final.

== Seeds ==
1. (Belgium) Sabine Appelmans (champion)
2. (United States) Patty Fendick (final)
3. (Indonesia) Yayuk Basuki (first round)
4. (Argentina) Florencia Labat (semifinals)
5. (United States) Meredith McGrath (quarterfinals)
6. (United States) Linda Harvey-Wild (second round)
7. (United States) Marianne Werdel (first round)
8. (France) Sandrine Testud (first round)

== Draw ==
=== Key ===
- Q = Qualifier
- WC = Wild card
- LL = Lucky loser
- Alt = Alternate
- SE = Special exempt
- PR = Protected ranking
- ITF = ITF entry
- JE = Junior exempt
- w/o = Walkover
- r = Retired
- d = Defaulted
- SR = Special ranking

=== Finals ===
Semifinals
1	(Belgium) Sabine Appelmans	6	6
4	(Argentina) Florencia Labat	4	2
(Australia) Kristine Radford	5	2
2	(United States) Patty Fendick	7	6

Final
1	(Belgium) Sabine Appelmans	6^{5}	7^{7}	6
2	(United States) Patty Fendick	7^{7}	6^{5}	2

=== Top half ===
First round
1	(Belgium) S Appelmans	6	6
(Australia) M Jaggard-Lai	3	2
(Spain) Á Montolio	2	3
WC	(Czech Republic) L Richterová	6	6
Q	(Netherlands) P Kamstra	3	6	6
(Japan) M Miyauchi	6	3	4
WC	(Thailand) T Tanasugarn	1	7	7
7	(United States) M Werdel	6	5	5
4	(Argentina) F Labat	1	6	6
(Czech Republic) A Strnadová	6	4	4
(Australia) J Byrne	3	1
(Italy) N Baudone	6	6
Q	(Italy) R Grande	7	3	6
Q	(Australia) K Godridge	5	6	2
(Indonesia) R Tedjakusuma	4	7^{8}	3
5	(United States) M McGrath	6	6^{6}	6

Second round
1	(Belgium) S Appelmans	6	7^{7}
WC	(Czech Republic) L Richterová	3	6^{3}
Q	(Netherlands) P Kamstra	6	3	6
WC	(Thailand) T Tanasugarn	2	6	3
4	(Argentina) F Labat	6	7^{7}
(Italy) N Baudone	4	6^{5}
Q	(Italy) R Grande	1	3
5	(United States) M McGrath	6	6

Quarterfinals
1	(Belgium) S Appelmans	7	6
Q	(Netherlands) P Kamstra	5	2
4	(Argentina) F Labat	7	6
5	(United States) M McGrath	5	3

Semifinals
1	(Belgium) S Appelmans	6	6
4	(Argentina) F Labat	4	2

=== Bottom half ===
First round
8	(France) S Testud	6^{3}	7^{7}	4
(Belgium) S Wasserman	7^{7}	6^{5}	6
(Australia) K Radford	6	6
(Austria) B Schett	3	0
(Czech Republic) E Švíglerová	6	6
(China) F Li	4	1
(United States) N Arendt	2	6	6
3	(Indonesia) Y Basuki	6	3	2
6	(United States) L Harvey-Wild	6	1	6
(France) A Dechaume-Balleret	4	6	3
(Austria) B Paulus	7^{7}	7
(United States) T Whitlinger-Jones	6^{5}	5
(Thailand) P Kansuthi	3	3
(Australia) R McQuillan	6	6
Q	(South Korea) M-r Jeon	2	2
2	(United States) P Fendick	6	6

Second round
(Belgium) S Wasserman	3	4
(Australia) K Radford	6	6
(Czech Republic) E Švíglerová	7^{7}	2	2
(United States) N Arendt	6^{3}	6	6
6	(United States) L Harvey-Wild	6	5	1
(Austria) B Paulus	4	7	6
(Australia) R McQuillan	2	2
2	(United States) P Fendick	6	6

Quarterfinals
(Australia) K Radford	6	6
(United States) N Arendt	1	4
(Austria) B Paulus	3	4
2	(United States) P Fendick	6	6

Semifinals
(Australia) K Radford	5	2
2	(United States) P Fendick	7	6
