= 1996 Volvo Women's Open – Singles =

Singles
- 1996 Volvo Women's Open
- 1995 Champion: (Austria) Barbara Paulus

Final
- Champion: (Romania) Ruxandra Dragomir
- Runner-up: (Thailand) Tamarine Tanasugarn
- Score: 7–6, 6–4

Details
- Draw: 32
- Seeds: 8

Events
Singles	Doubles
← 1995 ·	Thailand Open	· 1997 →

Barbara Paulus was the defending champion but did not compete that year.

Ruxandra Dragomir won in the final 7–6, 6–4 against Tamarine Tanasugarn.

== Seeds ==
A champion seed is indicated in bold text while text in italics indicates the round in which that seed was eliminated.

1. (Romania) **Ruxandra Dragomir (champion)**
2. (Chinese Taipei) Shi-Ting Wang (second round)
3. (Argentina) Florencia Labat (quarterfinals)
4. (Slovakia) Henrieta Nagyová (semifinals)
5. (Japan) Nana Miyagi (second round)
6. (Belgium) Nancy Feber (first round)
7. (Slovakia) Janette Husárová (quarterfinals)
8. (South Korea) Sung-Hee Park (second round)

== Draw ==
=== Key ===
- Q = Qualifier
- WC = Wild card
- LL = Lucky loser
- Alt = Alternate
- SE = Special exempt
- PR = Protected ranking
- ITF = ITF entry
- JE = Junior exempt
- w/o = Walkover
- r = Retired
- d = Defaulted
- SR = Special ranking

First round
1	(Romania) **R Dragomir**	0	**6**	**6**
(Czech Republic) L Varmužová	**6**	4	4
(Germany) **C Singer**	**6**	3	**6**
(Belarus) O Barabanschikova	3	**6**	4
(Japan) **M Saeki**	**6**	**7**
(Slovenia) T Križan	3	5
Q	(Russia) **T Panova**	**6**	3	**6**
6	(Belgium) N Feber	3	**6**	3
3	(Argentina) **F Labat**	**6**	**6**
(China) J-Q Yi	3	1
(Germany) V Martinek	2	**7**	1
(Germany) **A Glass**	**6**	5	**6**
(Czech Republic) **D Chládková**	**7**	**6**
(Czech Republic) L Cenková	5	4
(China) L-L Chen	2	**6**	6
8	(South Korea) **S-H Park**	**6**	3	**7**
7	(Slovakia) **J Husárová**	**6**	**6**
WC	(Thailand) B Sangaram	3	4
WC	(Thailand) P Suksamran	2	2
(Czech Republic) **A Gerši**	**6**	**6**
(Romania) **C Cristea**	**6**	2	**6**
Q	(Japan) S Obata	4	**6**	0
(Japan) K Nagatsuka	5	3
4	(Slovakia) **H Nagyová**	**7**	**6**
5	(Japan) **N Miyagi**	**6**	**7**
Q	(Hungary) R Kuti-Kis	1	5
(Thailand) **T Tanasugarn**	**6**	**6**
Q	(Japan) H Inoue	2	4
(Japan) **Y Yoshida**	**6**	**6**
(Italy) L Golarsa	3	3
(Israel) A Smashnova	5	2
2	(Chinese Taipei) **S-T Wang**	**7**	**6**

Second round
1	(Romania) **R Dragomir**	3	**7**	**6**
(Germany) C Singer	**6**	5	4
(Japan) **M Saeki**	4	**6**	**7**
Q	(Russia) T Panova	**6**	1	6
3	(Argentina) **F Labat**	**6**	3	**6**
(Germany) A Glass	3	**6**	4
(Czech Republic) **D Chládková**	3	**7**	**6**
8	(South Korea) S-H Park	**6**	5	0
7	(Slovakia) **J Husárová**	**6**	**6**
(Czech Republic) A Gerši	4	2
(Romania) C Cristea	4	1
4	(Slovakia) **H Nagyová**	**6**	**6**
5	(Japan) N Miyagi	2	5
(Thailand) **T Tanasugarn**	**6**	**7**
(Japan) **Y Yoshida**	**6**	1	**6**
2	(Chinese Taipei) S-T Wang	3	**6**	4

Quarterfinals
1	(Romania) **R Dragomir**	**6**	**6**
(Japan) M Saeki	1	2
3	(Argentina) F Labat	3	4
(Czech Republic) **D Chládková**	**6**	**6**
7	(Slovakia) J Husárová	4	1	r
4	(Slovakia) **H Nagyová**	**6**	**3**
(Thailand) **T Tanasugarn**	**6**	**6**
(Japan) Y Yoshida	1	2

Semifinals
1	(Romania) **R Dragomir**	**6**	**6**
(Czech Republic) D Chládková	4	3
4	(Slovakia) H Nagyová	**6**	5	0/r
(Thailand) **T Tanasugarn**	4	**7**	**4**

Final
1	(Romania) **Ruxandra Dragomir**	**7**	**6**
(Thailand) Tamarine Tanasugarn	6	4
