= 1996 Volvo Women's Open – Doubles =

Doubles
- 1996 Volvo Women's Open

Final
- Champions: (Japan) Miho Saeki; (Japan) Yuka Yoshida
- Runners-up: (Slovenia) Tina Križan; (Japan) Nana Miyagi
- Score: 6–2, 6–3

Details
- Draw: 16 (2Q)
- Seeds: 4

Events
Singles	Doubles
← 1995 ·	Thailand Open	· 1997 →

Jill Hetherington and Kristine Radford were the defending champions but did not compete that year.

Miho Saeki and Yuka Yoshida won in the final 6–2, 6–3 against Tina Križan and Nana Miyagi.

== Seeds ==
Champion seeds are indicated in bold text while text in italics indicates the round in which those seeds were eliminated.

1. (South Korea) Sung-Hee Park / (Chinese Taipei) Shi-Ting Wang (quarterfinals)
2. (Italy) Laura Golarsa / (Germany) Christina Singer (semifinals)
3. (Slovenia) Tina Križan / (Japan) Nana Miyagi (final)
4. (Belgium) Nancy Feber / (Japan) Kyōko Nagatsuka (first round)

== Draw ==
=== Key ===
- Q = Qualifier
- WC = Wild card
- LL = Lucky loser
- Alt = Alternate
- SE = Special exempt
- PR = Protected ranking
- ITF = ITF entry
- JE = Junior exempt
- w/o = Walkover
- r = Retired
- d = Defaulted
- SR = Special ranking

First round

Quarterfinals

Semifinals

Final

1
- (South Korea) S-H Park
- (Chinese Taipei) S-T Wang
**6**
**6**

- (Czech Republic) L Cenková
- (Czech Republic) D Chládková
1
4

1
- (South Korea) S-H Park
- (Chinese Taipei) S-T Wang
**6**
2
4

- (Slovakia) J Husárová
- (Argentina) F Labat
**6**
**7**

- (Slovakia) J Husárová
- (Argentina) F Labat
1
**6**
**6**

- (Japan) Y Hosoki
- (Japan) K Takuma
0
6

- (Slovakia) J Husárová
- (Argentina) F Labat
**7**
2
5

4
- (Belgium) N Feber
- (Japan) K Nagatsuka
3
**6**
2

- (Japan) M Saeki
- (Japan) Y Yoshida
6
**6**
**7**

- (Japan) M Saeki
- (Japan) Y Yoshida
**6**
3
**6**

- (Japan) M Saeki
- (Japan) Y Yoshida
**6**
**6**

- (Germany) A Glass
- (Germany) V Martinek
**6**
**6**

- (Germany) A Glass
- (Germany) V Martinek
2
2

- (Chinese Taipei) J Lee
- (Thailand) B Sangaram
4
3

- (Japan) Miho Saeki
- (Japan) Yuka Yoshida
**6**
**6**

- (Romania) C Cristea
- (Czech Republic) L Varmužová

3
- (Slovenia) Tina Križan
- (Japan) Nana Miyagi
2
3

- (Hungary) V Csurgo
- (Slovakia) H Nagyová
**w/o**

- (Hungary) V Csurgo
- (Slovakia) H Nagyová
2
3

Q
- (Belarus) O Barabanschikova
- (Australia) L Pleming
6
2

3
- (Slovenia) T Križan
- (Japan) N Miyagi
**6**
**6**

3
- (Slovenia) T Križan
- (Japan) N Miyagi
**7**
**6**

3
- (Slovenia) T Križan
- (Japan) N Miyagi
**6**
**7**

- (Australia) D Jones
- (Thailand) T Tanasugarn
**6**
4
**7**

2
- (Italy) L Golarsa
- (Germany) C Singer
3
5

- (Czech Republic) A Gerši
- (Czech Republic) J Pospíšilová
2
**6**
5

- (Australia) D Jones
- (Thailand) T Tanasugarn
5
**6**
6

Q
- (Japan) H Mochizuki
- (Japan) S Obata
2
2

2
- (Italy) L Golarsa
- (Germany) C Singer
**7**
3
**7**

2
- (Italy) L Golarsa
- (Germany) C Singer
**6**
**6**
