= 1997 Volvo Women's Open – Doubles =

Doubles
- 1997 Volvo Women's Open

Final
- Champions: (Australia) Kristine Kunce; (United States) Corina Morariu
- Runners-up: (Argentina) Florencia Labat; (Belgium) Dominique Van Roost
- Score: 6–3, 6–4

Details
- Draw: 16 (1Q/1WC)
- Seeds: 4

Events
| Singles | Doubles |
| ← 1996 · | Thailand Open | · 1998 → |

Miho Saeki and Yuka Yoshida were the defending champions but lost in the quarterfinals to Kristine Kunce and Corina Morariu.

Kunce and Morariu won in the final 6–3, 6–4 against Florencia Labat and Dominique Van Roost.

== Seeds ==
Champion seeds are indicated in bold text while text in italics indicates the round in which those seeds were eliminated.

1. (Slovakia) Henrieta Nagyová / (Czech Republic) Helena Vildová (first round)
2. (South Korea) Sung-Hee Park / (Chinese Taipei) Shi-Ting Wang (quarterfinals)
3. (Japan) Rika Hiraki / (Thailand) Tamarine Tanasugarn (first round)
4. (Argentina) Florencia Labat / (Belgium) Dominique Van Roost (final)

== Draw ==
=== Key ===
- Q = Qualifier
- WC = Wild card
- LL = Lucky loser
- Alt = Alternate
- ITF = ITF entry
- PR = Protected ranking
- SR = Special ranking
- SE = Special exempt
- JE = Junior exempt
- JR = Junior Accelerator Programme entrant
- CO = College Accelerator Programme entrant
- NG = Next Gen Accelerator Program entrant
- w/o = Walkover
- r = Retired
- d = Defaulted

First round

Quarterfinals

Semifinals

Final

1
- (Slovakia) H Nagyová
- (Czech Republic) H Vildová
**6**
3
3

- (Japan) M Saeki
- (Japan) Y Yoshida
4
**6**
**6**

- (Japan) M Saeki
- (Japan) Y Yoshida
**7**
5
2

- (Australia) K Kunce
- (United States) C Morariu
**6**
**6**

- (Australia) K Kunce
- (United States) C Morariu
5
**7**
**6**

- (South Africa) L Horn
- (Austria) K Kschwendt
3
1

- (Australia) K Kunce
- (United States) C Morariu
1
**6**
**6**

3
- (Japan) R Hiraki
- (Thailand) T Tanasugarn
2
3

- (Netherlands) S Noorlander
- (France) N van Lottum
**6**
4
4

- (Netherlands) S Noorlander
- (France) N van Lottum
**6**
**6**

- (Netherlands) S Noorlander
- (France) N van Lottum
1
**6**
**6**

Q
- (United Kingdom) A Tordoff
- (China) J-Q Yi
5
1

- (Romania) C Cristea
- (Romania) R Dragomir
**6**
4
4

- (Romania) C Cristea
- (Romania) R Dragomir
**7**
**6**

- (Australia) Kristine Kunce
- (United States) Corina Morariu
**6**
**6**

WC
- (Japan) S Asagoe
- (Thailand) B Sangaram
1
1

4
- (Argentina) Florencia Labat
- (Belgium) Dominique Van Roost
3
4

- (Australia) A Ellwood
- (Australia) N Pratt
**6**
**6**

- (Australia) A Ellwood
- (Australia) N Pratt
**6**
6
4

- (Russia) E Kulikovskaya
- (Bulgaria) P Stoyanova
2
**6**
6

4
- (Argentina) F Labat
- (Belgium) D Van Roost
4
**7**
**6**

4
- (Argentina) F Labat
- (Belgium) D Van Roost
**6**
3
**7**

4
- (Argentina) F Labat
- (Belgium) D Van Roost
**6**
**7**

- (Sweden) Å Carlsson
- (Italy) L Golarsa
3
4

- (Belarus) O Barabanschikova
- (Australia) L Pleming
4
6

- (Belarus) O Barabanschikova
- (Australia) L Pleming
**6**
**6**

- (Belarus) O Barabanschikova
- (Australia) L Pleming
**w/o**

- (Belgium) L Courtois
- (Hungary) V Csurgo
1
1

2
- (South Korea) S-H Park
- (Chinese Taipei) S-T Wang

2
- (South Korea) S-H Park
- (Chinese Taipei) S-T Wang
**6**
**6**
