= 1993 Volvo Women's Open – Singles =

Singles
- 1993 Volvo Women's Open

Final
- Champion: (Indonesia) Yayuk Basuki
- Runner-up: (United States) Marianne Werdel
- Score: 6–3, 6–1

Details
- Draw: 32 (2WC/4Q)
- Seeds: 8

Events
Singles	Doubles
← 1992 ·	Thailand Open	· 1994 →

Sabine Appelmans was the defending champion, but did not compete this year.

Yayuk Basuki won the title by defeating Marianne Werdel 6–3, 6–1 in the final.

== Seeds ==
1. (United States) Patty Fendick (semifinals)
2. (Australia) Nicole Provis (second round)
3. (Germany) Wiltrud Probst (quarterfinals)
4. (Netherlands) Stephanie Rottier (semifinals)
5. (France) Pascale Paradis-Mangon (first round)
6. (United States) Ann Grossman (first round)
7. (Czech Republic) Andrea Strnadová (first round)
8. (Indonesia) Yayuk Basuki (champion)

== Draw ==
=== Key ===
- Q = Qualifier
- WC = Wild card
- LL = Lucky loser
- Alt = Alternate
- SE = Special exempt
- PR = Protected ranking
- ITF = ITF entry
- JE = Junior exempt
- w/o = Walkover
- r = Retired
- d = Defaulted
- SR = Special ranking

=== Finals ===
Semifinals
1	(United States) Patty Fendick	4	0
8	(Indonesia) Yayuk Basuki	6	6
4	(Netherlands) Stephanie Rottier	2	1
(United States) Marianne Werdel	6	6

Final
8	(Indonesia) Yayuk Basuki	6	6
(United States) Marianne Werdel	3	1

=== Top half ===
First round
1	(United States) P Fendick	6	6
(Italy) M Grossi	1	0
Q	(Australia) R Stubbs	6	7^{7}
WC	(Thailand) T Tanasugarn	4	6^{3}
(Canada) H Kelesi	6	6
(Belgium) S Wasserman	2	3
(United States) C Cunningham	7	1	6
6	(United States) A Grossman	5	6	2
3	(Germany) W Probst	6^{6}	6	6
Q	(Indonesia) R Tedjakusuma	7^{8}	4	4
(Netherlands) M Oremans	6	6
Q	(Netherlands) L Niemantsverdriet	3	4
WC	(Thailand) S Duangchan	3	6	3
(United Kingdom) M Javer	6	3	6
(Slovakia) K Habšudová	2	2
8	(Indonesia) Y Basuki	6	6

Second round
1	(United States) P Fendick	6	6
Q	(Australia) R Stubbs	3	3
(Canada) H Kelesi	6	6
(United States) C Cunningham	2	3
3	(Germany) W Probst	3	7	6
(Netherlands) M Oremans	6	5	4
(United Kingdom) M Javer	6^{6}	0
8	(Indonesia) Y Basuki	7^{8}	6

Quarterfinals
1	(United States) P Fendick	6	6
(Canada) H Kelesi	2	3
3	(Germany) W Probst	6^{8}	3
8	(Indonesia) Y Basuki	7^{10}	6

Semifinals
1	(United States) P Fendick	4	0
8	(Indonesia) Y Basuki	6	6

=== Bottom half ===
First round
5	(France) P Paradis-Mangon	1	7	4
(United States) N Arendt	6	5	6
(Australia) M Jaggard-Lai	4	7	6
(Romania) R Dragomir	6	5	2
(France) K Quentrec	7	6
(Australia) J Byrne	5	4
(Germany) C Porwik	1	2
4	(Netherlands) S Rottier	6	6
7	(Czech Republic) A Strnadová	5	5
(France) S Testud	7	7
(United States) M McGrath	6	5	6^{2}
(China) F Li	4	7	7^{7}
(United States) M Werdel	6	6
(Belgium) N Feber	4	2
Q	(United States) C MacGregor	6	3	1
2	(Australia) N Provis	4	6	6

Second round
(United States) N Arendt	2	6	6
(Australia) M Jaggard-Lai	6	3	4
(France) K Quentrec	6	2	1
4	(Netherlands) S Rottier	2	6	6
(France) S Testud	3	6	6
(China) F Li	6	3	2
(United States) M Werdel	6	6
2	(Australia) N Provis	3	4

Quarterfinals
(United States) N Arendt	6	4	3
4	(Netherlands) S Rottier	0	6	6
(France) S Testud	2	3
(United States) M Werdel	6	6

Semifinals
4	(Netherlands) S Rottier	2	1
(United States) M Werdel	6	6
