= 2008 Pattaya Women's Open – Doubles =

Doubles
- 2008 Pattaya Women's Open

Final
- Champions: (Chinese Taipei) Chan Yung-jan (Chinese Taipei) Chuang Chia-jung
- Runners-up: (Chinese Taipei) Hsieh Su-wei (United States) Vania King
- Score: 6–4, 6–4

Details
- Draw: 16
- Seeds: 4

Events
Singles	Doubles
← 2007 ·	Pattaya Women's Open	· 2009 →

Nicole Pratt and Mara Santangelo were the defending champions, but chose not to participate that year.

Chan Yung-jan and Chuang Chia-jung won in the final 6–4, 6–4, against Hsieh Su-wei and Vania King.

== Seeds ==
1. (Chinese Taipei) Chan Yung-jan / (Chinese Taipei) Chuang Chia-jung (champions)
2. (Chinese Taipei) Hsieh Su-wei / (United States) Vania King (final)
3. (Czech Republic) Renata Voráčová / (Czech Republic) Barbora Záhlavová-Strýcová (first round)
4. (China) Ji Chunmei / (China) Sun Shengnan (first round)

== Draw ==
=== Key ===
- Q = Qualifier
- WC = Wild card
- LL = Lucky loser
- Alt = Alternate
- SE = Special exempt
- PR = Protected ranking
- ITF = ITF entry
- JE = Junior exempt
- w/o = Walkover
- r = Retired
- d = Defaulted
- SR = Special ranking

=== Draw ===
First round
1	(Chinese Taipei) Y-j Chan (Chinese Taipei) C-j Chuang	6	6
(Russia) A Kudryavtseva (Russia) V Manasieva	4	1
(Ukraine) O Savchuk (Russia) Y Shvedova	4	2
(United States) J Craybas (United States) L Osterloh	6	6
3	(Czech Republic) R Voráčová (Czech Republic) B Záhlavová-Strýcová	4	3
(Romania) A Ehritt-Vanc (Thailand) T Tanasugarn	6	6
(Chinese Taipei) C-w Chan (Japan) A Yonemura	3	1
(China) X Han (China) Y Xu	6	6
(Slovenia) A Klepač (United States) S Rao	4	5
(Russia) An Rodionova (Russia) Ar Rodionova	6	7
WC	(Thailand) S Mulsap (Thailand) V Wongteanchai	6	6
4	(China) C Ji (China) S Sun	3	3
(Uzbekistan) A Amanmuradova (Russia) E Bychkova	5	1
(Poland) A Radwańska (Poland) U Radwańska	7	6
(Japan) K Iijima (Japan) J Namigata	2	1
2	(Chinese Taipei) S-w Hsieh (United States) V King	6	6

Quarterfinals
1	(Chinese Taipei) Y-j Chan (Chinese Taipei) C-j Chuang	6	2	[10]
(United States) J Craybas (United States) L Osterloh	1	6	[6]
(Romania) A Ehritt-Vanc (Thailand) T Tanasugarn	7	7
(China) X Han (China) Y Xu	5	5
(Russia) An Rodionova (Russia) Ar Rodionova	7	7
WC	(Thailand) S Mulsap (Thailand) V Wongteanchai	6^{1}	6^{5}
(Poland) A Radwańska (Poland) U Radwańska	4	5
2	(Chinese Taipei) S-w Hsieh (United States) V King	6	7

Semifinals
1	(Chinese Taipei) Y-j Chan (Chinese Taipei) C-j Chuang	6	7
(Romania) A Ehritt-Vanc (Thailand) T Tanasugarn	4	5
(Russia) An Rodionova (Russia) Ar Rodionova	7	2	[1]
2	(Chinese Taipei) S-w Hsieh (United States) V King	6^{3}	6	[10]

Final
1	(Chinese Taipei) Y-j Chan (Chinese Taipei) C-j Chuang	6	6
2	(Chinese Taipei) S-w Hsieh (United States) V King	4	3
