= 1997 Volvo Women's Open – Singles =

Singles
- 1997 Volvo Women's Open
- 1996 Champion: (Romania) Ruxandra Dragomir

Final
- Champion: (Slovakia) Henrieta Nagyová
- Runner-up: (Belgium) Dominique Van Roost
- Score: 7–5, 6–7, 7–5

Details
- Draw: 32
- Seeds: 8

Events
Singles	Doubles
← 1996 ·	Thailand Open	· 1998 →

Ruxandra Dragomir was the defending champion of the Volvo Women's Open but lost in the semifinals to Henrieta Nagyová.

Nagyová won in the final 7–5, 6–7, 7–5 against Dominique Van Roost.

== Seeds ==
A champion seed is indicated in bold text while text in italics indicates the round in which that seed was eliminated.

1. (Romania) Ruxandra Dragomir (semifinals)
2. (Belgium) Dominique Van Roost (final)
3. (Argentina) Florencia Labat (first round)
4. (Slovakia) **Henrieta Nagyová (champion)**
5. (Thailand) Tamarine Tanasugarn (second round)
6. (Czech Republic) Denisa Chládková (first round)
7. (Czech Republic) Sandra Kleinová (quarterfinals)
8. (Sweden) Åsa Carlsson (first round)

== Draw ==
=== Key ===
- Q = Qualifier
- WC = Wild card
- LL = Lucky loser
- Alt = Alternate
- ITF = ITF entry
- PR = Protected ranking
- SR = Special ranking
- SE = Special exempt
- JE = Junior exempt
- JR = Junior Accelerator Programme entrant
- CO = College Accelerator Programme entrant
- NG = Next Gen Accelerator Program entrant
- w/o = Walkover
- r = Retired
- d = Defaulted

First round
1	(Romania) **R Dragomir**	**6**	5	**6**
Q	(South Africa) L Horn	2	**7**	4
(Japan) Y Yoshida	2	3
(Italy) **L Golarsa**	**6**	**6**
Q	(Australia) K Kunce	1	2
(United States) **C Morariu**	**6**	**6**
(Japan) R Hiraki	4	3
5	(Thailand) **T Tanasugarn**	**6**	**6**
4	(Slovakia) **H Nagyová**	1	**6**	**6**
(Japan) M Endo	**6**	4	2
(Japan) M Saeki	1	2
(Chinese Taipei) **S-T Wang**	**6**	**6**
Q	(Belgium) D van de Zande	3	3
(Netherlands) **S Noorlander**	**6**	**6**
(Russia) T Panova	**6**	5	2
7	(Czech Republic) **S Kleinová**	1	**7**	**6**
6	(Czech Republic) D Chládková	**6**	6	2
(Belarus) **O Barabanschikova**	3	**7**	**6**
(Russia) E Kulikovskaya	2	**7**	4
(South Korea) **S-H Park**	**6**	5	**6**
(Australia) **A Ellwood**	2	**6**	**6**
(Switzerland) E Gagliardi	**6**	3	4
(Australia) **N Pratt**	**6**	**6**
3	(Argentina) F Labat	3	3
8	(Sweden) Å Carlsson	1	2
(Belgium) **L Courtois**	**6**	**6**
(Romania) **C Cristea**	**6**	**6**
Q	(South Korea) Y-J Cho	3	3
WC	(Thailand) **B Sangaram**	**6**	**7**
WC	(Thailand) M Niroj	1	6
(France) N van Lottum	4	0
2	(Belgium) **D Van Roost**	**6**	**6**

Second round
1	(Romania) **R Dragomir**	**6**	2	**7**
(Italy) L Golarsa	3	**6**	5
(United States) **C Morariu**	4	**6**	**6**
5	(Thailand) T Tanasugarn	**6**	4	2
4	(Slovakia) **H Nagyová**	**7**	**6**
(Chinese Taipei) S-T Wang	5	3
(Netherlands) S Noorlander	4	5
7	(Czech Republic) **S Kleinová**	**6**	**7**
(Belarus) **O Barabanschikova**	**7**	**2**
(South Korea) S-H Park	6	2	r
(Australia) A Ellwood	3	**7**	4
(Australia) **N Pratt**	**6**	6	**6**
(Belgium) **L Courtois**	**7**	**7**
(Romania) C Cristea	5	5
WC	(Thailand) B Sangaram	0	1
2	(Belgium) **D Van Roost**	**6**	**6**

Quarterfinals
1	(Romania) **R Dragomir**	4	**6**	**6**
(United States) C Morariu	**6**	3	0
4	(Slovakia) **H Nagyová**	**6**	**6**
7	(Czech Republic) S Kleinová	3	4
(Belarus) **O Barabanschikova**	**6**	**6**
(Australia) N Pratt	0	3
(Belgium) L Courtois	2	1
2	(Belgium) **D Van Roost**	**6**	**6**

Semifinals
1	(Romania) R Dragomir	**6**	5	2
4	(Slovakia) **H Nagyová**	4	**7**	**6**
(Belarus) O Barabanschikova	3	2
2	(Belgium) **D Van Roost**	**6**	**6**

Final
4	(Slovakia) **Henrieta Nagyová**	**7**	6	**7**
2	(Belgium) D Van Roost	5	**7**	5
