= 2008 Pattaya Women's Open – Singles =

Singles
- 2008 Pattaya Women's Open

Final
- Champion: (Poland) Agnieszka Radwańska
- Runner-up: (United States) Jill Craybas
- Score: 6–2, 1–6, 7–6^{(7–4)}

Details
- Draw: 32
- Seeds: 8

Events
Singles	Doubles
← 2007 ·	Pattaya Women's Open	· 2009 →

Sybille Bammer was the defending champion, but chose not to participate that year.

Agnieszka Radwańska won in the final 6–2, 1–6, 7–6^{(7–4)}, against Jill Craybas.

== Seeds ==
1. (Poland) Agnieszka Radwańska (champion)
2. (Australia) Casey Dellacqua (second round)
3. (India) Sania Mirza (withdrew due to a left adductor magnus strain)
4. (Chinese Taipei) Yung-jan Chan (quarterfinals)
5. (Germany) Angelique Kerber (second round)
6. (Russia) Yaroslava Shvedova (first round)
7. (United States) Jill Craybas (final)
8. (Russia) Anastasia Rodionova (first round)
9. (Israel) Tzipora Obziler (second round)

== Draw ==
=== Key ===
- Q = Qualifier
- WC = Wild card
- LL = Lucky loser
- Alt = Alternate
- SE = Special exempt
- PR = Protected ranking
- ITF = ITF entry
- JE = Junior exempt
- w/o = Walkover
- r = Retired
- d = Defaulted
- SR = Special ranking

=== Finals ===
Semifinals
1	(Poland) Agnieszka Radwańska	6	6
(Russia) Ekaterina Bychkova	1	1
(Uzbekistan) Akgul Amanmuradova	4	0
7	(United States) Jill Craybas	6	6

Final
1	(Poland) Agnieszka Radwańska	6	1	7
7	(United States) Jill Craybas	2	6	6^{4}

=== Top half ===
First round
1	(Poland) A Radwańska	7	7
(United States) V King	5	6^{5}
(Luxembourg) A Kremer	7	6
Q	(China) Y-f Xu	6^{4}	1
(Russia) A Kudryavtseva	2	3
(Russia) O Poutchkova	6	6
(Thailand) T Tanasugarn	6	6
8	(Russia) A Rodionova	2	1
5	(Germany) A Kerber	6	7
(China) M Yuan	3	5
WC	(Thailand) N Luangnam	0	1
Q	(Russia) V Manasieva	6	6
LL	(Japan) J Namigata	1	4
LL	(United States) S Rao	6	6
(Russia) E Bychkova	3	7	6
6	(Russia) Y Shvedova	6	6^{4}	3

Second round
1	(Poland) A Radwańska	6	6
(Luxembourg) A Kremer	2	2
(Russia) O Poutchkova	6	4	4
(Thailand) T Tanasugarn	4	6	6
5	(Germany) A Kerber	2	1
Q	(Russia) V Manasieva	6	6
LL	(United States) S Rao	4	4
(Russia) E Bychkova	6	6

Quarterfinals
1	(Poland) A Radwańska	6	6
(Thailand) T Tanasugarn	2	3
Q	(Russia) V Manasieva	6	6^{6}	3
(Russia) E Bychkova	4	7	6

Semifinals
1	(Poland) A Radwańska	6	6
(Russia) E Bychkova	1	1

=== Bottom half ===
First round
9	(Israel) T Obziler	6	6
WC	(Thailand) N Lertcheewakarn	1	2
(Czech Republic) B Záhlavová-Strýcová	3	2
(Uzbekistan) A Amanmuradova	6	6
(United States) L Osterloh	7	6
(China) S Zhang	5	2
Q	(China) Y-m Zhou	4	2
4	(Chinese Taipei) Y-j Chan	6	6
7	(United States) J Craybas	6	6
(Ukraine) O Savchuk	1	1
(Hungary) M Czink	3	1
(Czech Republic) R Voráčová	6	6
WC	(Poland) U Radwańska	6^{1}	2
(Slovenia) A Klepač	7	6
Q	(Japan) A Yonemura	2	3
2	(Australia) C Dellacqua	6	6

Second round
9	(Israel) T Obziler	4	2
(Uzbekistan) A Amanmuradova	6	6
(United States) L Osterloh	4	2
4	(Chinese Taipei) Y-j Chan	6	6
7	(United States) J Craybas	2	6	6
(Czech Republic) R Voráčová	6	1	3
(Slovenia) A Klepač	7	2	6
2	(Australia) C Dellacqua	5	6	2

Quarterfinals
(Uzbekistan) A Amanmuradova	6	7
4	(Chinese Taipei) Y-j Chan	1	6^{5}
7	(United States) J Craybas	6	6
(Slovenia) A Klepač	4	4

Semifinals
(Uzbekistan) A Amanmuradova	4	0
7	(United States) J Craybas	6	6
