= 1995 Volvo Women's Open – Doubles =

Doubles
- 1995 Volvo Women's Open

Final
- Champions: (Canada) Jill Hetherington (Australia) Kristine Radford
- Runners-up: (Australia) Kristin Godridge (Japan) Nana Miyagi
- Score: 2–6, 6–4, 6–3

Details
- Draw: 16 (2Q/1WC)
- Seeds: 4

Events
Singles	Doubles
← 1994 ·	Thailand Open	· 1996 →

Patty Fendick and Meredith McGrath were the defending champions, but did not compete this year. Fendick retired from professional tennis during this season, while McGrath competed at the WTA Tour Championships, which was held at the same week.

Jill Hetherington and Kristine Radford won the title by defeating Kristin Godridge and Nana Miyagi 2–6, 6–4, 6–3 in the final.

== Seeds ==
1. (Canada) Jill Hetherington / (Australia) Kristine Radford (champions)
2. (Australia) Rachel McQuillan / (Germany) Claudia Porwik (semifinals)
3. (Australia) Kristin Godridge / (Japan) Nana Miyagi (final)
4. (Japan) Rika Hiraki / (Japan) Naoko Kijimuta (semifinals, withdrew)

== Draw ==
=== Key ===
- Q = Qualifier
- WC = Wild card
- LL = Lucky loser
- Alt = Alternate
- SE = Special exempt
- PR = Protected ranking
- ITF = ITF entry
- JE = Junior exempt
- w/o = Walkover
- r = Retired
- d = Defaulted
- SR = Special ranking

=== Draw ===
First round
1	(Canada) J Hetherington (Australia) K Radford	6	6
(Germany) S Hack (Germany) S Meier	3	2
(Belgium) N Feber (Italy) R Grande	2	7	4
(Ukraine) O Lugina (Poland) A Olsza	6	6	6
4	(Japan) R Hiraki (Japan) N Kijimuta	6	6
(South Korea) S-h Park (Chinese Taipei) S-t Wang	1	1
(Romania) C Cristea (United States) J Watanabe	6	6
(Czech Republic) L Richterová (Austria) P Schwarz	4	4
(Ukraine) E Brioukhovets (Hungary) V Csurgó	6	1	2
WC	(Thailand) S Duangchan (Thailand) T Tanasugarn	1	6	6
Q	(Australia) L Pleming (France) C Tanvier	2	4
3	(Australia) K Godridge (Japan) N Miyagi	6	6
Q	(China) L-l Chen (China) F Li	6	6
(Slovakia) J Husárová (Croatia) M Murić	2	3
(Japan) M Saeki (Japan) Y Yoshida	4	3
2	(Australia) R McQuillan (Germany) C Porwik	6	6

Quarterfinals
1	(Canada) J Hetherington (Australia) K Radford	6	7
(Ukraine) O Lugina (Poland) A Olsza	1	5
4	(Japan) R Hiraki (Japan) N Kijimuta	6	6
(Romania) C Cristea (United States) J Watanabe	2	1
WC	(Thailand) S Duangchan (Thailand) T Tanasugarn	7	4	1
3	(Australia) K Godridge (Japan) N Miyagi	6	6	6
Q	(China) L-l Chen (China) F Li	6	7	2
2	(Australia) R McQuillan (Germany) C Porwik	7	6	6

Semifinals
1	(Canada) J Hetherington (Australia) K Radford	w/o
4	(Japan) R Hiraki (Japan) N Kijimuta
3	(Australia) K Godridge (Japan) N Miyagi	7	6
2	(Australia) R McQuillan (Germany) C Porwik	6	3

Final
1	(Canada) J Hetherington (Australia) K Radford	2	6	6
3	(Australia) K Godridge (Japan) N Miyagi	6	4	3
