= 2009 Pattaya Women's Open – Doubles =

Doubles
- 2009 Pattaya Women's Open

Final
- Champions: (Kazakhstan) Yaroslava Shvedova; (Thailand) Tamarine Tanasugarn
- Runners-up: (Ukraine) Yuliya Beygelzimer; (Russia) Vitalia Diatchenko
- Score: 6–3, 6–2

Details
- Draw: 12
- Seeds: 4

Events
Singles	Doubles
← 2008 ·	Pattaya Women's Open	· 2010 →

Chan Yung-jan and Chuang Chia-jung are the defending champions but only Chuang Chia-jung participated this year.

Chuang Chia-jung partnered Akgul Amanmuradova, but they lost in semifinals to Yuliya Beygelzimer and Vitalia Diatchenko.

== Seeds ==
1. (Uzbekistan) Akgul Amanmuradova / (Chinese Taipei) Chuang Chia-jung (semifinals)
2. (Kazakhstan) Yaroslava Shvedova / (Thailand) Tamarine Tanasugarn (champions)
3. (India) Sania Mirza / (Italy) Mara Santangelo (semifinals)
4. (Slovenia) Andreja Klepač / (Poland) Urszula Radwańska (quarterfinals, withdrew)

== Draw ==
Key

- Q = Qualifier
- WC = Wild card
- LL = Lucky loser
- Alt = Alternate
- ITF = ITF entry
- PR = Protected ranking
- SR = Special ranking
- SE = Special exempt
- JE = Junior exempt
- JR = Junior Accelerator Programme entrant
- CO = College Accelerator Programme entrant
- NG = Next Gen Accelerator Program entrant
- w/o = Walkover
- r = Retired
- d = Defaulted

=== Draw ===
First round

Quarterfinals

Semifinals

Final

1
- (Uzbekistan) A Amanmuradova
- (Chinese Taipei) C-j Chuang
6
6

- (Japan) S Hisamatsu
- (Thailand) M Tangphong
1
4

- (Japan) R Fuda
- (Japan) T Yonemura
1
3

- (Japan) R Fuda
- (Japan) T Yonemura
6
6

1
- (Uzbekistan) A Amanmuradova
2
4

- (Ukraine) Y Beygelzimer
- (Russia) V Diatchenko
6
6

4
- (Slovenia) A Klepač
- (Poland) U Radwańska

- (Japan) K Date-Krumm
- (Kazakhstan) S Karatantcheva
0
6^{3}

- (Ukraine) Y Beygelzimer
- (Russia) V Diatchenko
w/o

- (Ukraine) Y Beygelzimer
- (Russia) V Diatchenko
6
7

- (Ukraine) Y Beygelzimer
- (Russia) V Diatchenko
3
2

- (Croatia) I Lisjak
- (Austria) T Paszek
3
2

2
- (Kazakhstan) Y Shvedova
- (Thailand) T Tanasugarn
6
6

- (Russia) E Bovina
- (Russia) K Pervak
6
6

- (Russia) E Bovina
- (Russia) K Pervak
4
3

3
- (India) S Mirza
- (Italy) M Santangelo
6
6

3
- (India) S Mirza
- (Italy) M Santangelo
6
2
[7]

- (Italy) A Besser
- (United States) M Moulton-Levy
4
0

2
- (Kazakhstan) Y Shvedova
- (Thailand) T Tanasugarn
2
6
[10]

WC
- (Thailand) N Wannasuk
- (Thailand) V Wongteanchai
6
6

WC
- (Thailand) N Wannasuk
- (Thailand) V Wongteanchai
0
3

2
- (Kazakhstan) Y Shvedova
- (Thailand) T Tanasugarn
6
6
