= 1996 Volvo Women's Open =

- Date: 18–24 November
- Edition: 6th
- Category: Tier IV
- Draw: 32S / 16D
- Prize money: $107,500
- Surface: Hard / outdoor
- Location: Pattaya, Thailand

Champions

Singles
- (Romania) Ruxandra Dragomir

Doubles
- (Japan) Miho Saeki / (Japan) Yuka Yoshida
← 1995 ·	Thailand Open	· 1997 →

The 1996 Volvo Women's Open was a women's tennis tournament played on outdoor hard courts in Pattaya in Thailand that was part of Tier IV of the 1996 WTA Tour. It was the sixth edition of the tournament and was held from 18 November through 24 November 1996. First-seeded Ruxandra Dragomir won the singles title.

== Finals ==
=== Singles ===
(Romania) Ruxandra Dragomir defeated (Thailand) Tamarine Tanasugarn 7–6, 6–4

- It was Dragomir's 3rd singles title of the year and of her career.

=== Doubles ===
(Japan) Miho Saeki / (Japan) Yuka Yoshida defeated (Slovenia) Tina Križan / (Japan) Nana Miyagi 6–2, 6–3

- It was Saeki's 2nd title of the year and the 3rd of her career. It was Yoshida's only title of the year and the 2nd of her career.
