= 2010 PTT Pattaya Open – Singles =

Singles
- 2010 PTT Pattaya Open

Final
- Champion: (Russia) Vera Zvonareva
- Runner-up: (Thailand) Tamarine Tanasugarn
- Score: 6–4, 6–4

Details
- Draw: 32
- Seeds: 8

Events
Singles	Doubles
← 2009 ·	PTT Pattaya Open	· 2011 →

Vera Zvonareva was the defending champion and she defended the title, defeating Tamarine Tanasugarn in the final, 6–4, 6–4.

== Seeds ==
1. (Russia) Vera Zvonareva (champion)
2. (Germany) Sabine Lisicki (second round)
3. (Russia) Vera Dushevina (second round)
4. (Kazakhstan) Yaroslava Shvedova (semifinals)
5. (Austria) Sybille Bammer (quarterfinals)
6. (India) Sania Mirza (first round)
7. (Japan) Kimiko Date-Krumm (first round, retired)
8. (Germany) Julia Görges (second round)

== Draw ==
=== Key ===
- Q = Qualifier
- WC = Wild card
- LL = Lucky loser
- Alt = Alternate
- SE = Special exempt
- PR = Protected ranking
- ITF = ITF entry
- JE = Junior exempt
- w/o = Walkover
- r = Retired
- d = Defaulted
- SR = Special ranking

=== Finals ===
Semifinals
1	(Russia) Vera Zvonareva	6	4	6
4	(Kazakhstan) Yaroslava Shvedova	2	6	3
(Kazakhstan) Sesil Karatantcheva	2	0
(Thailand) Tamarine Tanasugarn	6	6

Final
1	(Russia) Vera Zvonareva	6	6
(Thailand) Tamarine Tanasugarn	4	4

=== Top half ===
First round
1	(Russia) V Zvonareva	6	6
(Russia) K Pervak	3	2
(Italy) A Brianti	6	4	6
Q	(New Zealand) S Jones	4	6	1
(Chinese Taipei) K-c Chang	4	6	6
WC	(Thailand) V Wongteanchai	6	3	3
(New Zealand) M Erakovic	6^{8}	5
5	(Austria) S Bammer	7	7
4	(Kazakhstan) Y Shvedova	6	6
(Japan) A Morita	2	4
WC	(Thailand) N Lertcheewakarn	7	4	4
(South Africa) C Scheepers	6^{9}	6	6
(Chinese Taipei) Y-j Chan	6	6
Q	(China) Y-M Zhou	2	3
(Germany) T Malek	3	6	6
6	(India) S Mirza	6	4	3

Second round
1	(Russia) V Zvonareva	6	6
(Italy) A Brianti	3	2
(Chinese Taipei) K-c Chang	7	4	2
5	(Austria) S Bammer	5	6	6
4	(Kazakhstan) Y Shvedova	7	6
(South Africa) C Scheepers	6^{8}	3
(Chinese Taipei) Y-j Chan	2	6	5
(Germany) T Malek	6	0	7

Quarterfinals
1	(Russia) V Zvonareva	6	7
5	(Austria) S Bammer	0	6^{5}
4	(Kazakhstan) Y Shvedova	7	6
(Germany) T Malek	6^{4}	1

Semifinals
1	(Russia) V Zvonareva	6	4	6
4	(Kazakhstan) Y Shvedova	2	6	3

=== Bottom half ===
First round
8	(Germany) J Görges	6	6
Q	(Greece) A Gerasimou	4	4
WC	(Thailand) S Viratprasert	1	5
(Kazakhstan) S Karatantcheva	6	7
(Russia) E Bychkova	6^{4}	6	7
Q	(Thailand) N Luangnam	7	1	6^{3}
(Kazakhstan) G Voskoboeva	4	2
3	(Russia) V Dushevina	6	6
7	(Japan) K Date-Krumm	1	0	r
(Australia) A Rodionova	6	1
(Russia) A Chakvetadze	6	3	6
(United States) J Craybas	1	6	3
(Thailand) T Tanasugarn	6	6
(Russia) A Kudryavtseva	1	2
(Uzbekistan) A Amanmuradova	0	r
2	(Germany) S Lisicki	6

Second round
8	(Germany) J Görges	2	1
(Kazakhstan) S Karatantcheva	6	6
(Russia) E Bychkova	6	6
3	(Russia) V Dushevina	4	1
(Australia) A Rodionova	4	1
(Russia) A Chakvetadze	6	6
(Thailand) T Tanasugarn	6	3	7
2	(Germany) S Lisicki	3	6	5

Quarterfinals
(Kazakhstan) S Karatantcheva	7	4	7
(Russia) E Bychkova	5	6	5
(Russia) A Chakvetadze	1	4
(Thailand) T Tanasugarn	6	6

Semifinals
(Kazakhstan) S Karatantcheva	2	0
(Thailand) T Tanasugarn	6	6
