= 2010 PTT Pattaya Open – Doubles =

Doubles
- 2010 PTT Pattaya Open

Final
- Champions: (New Zealand) Marina Erakovic; (Thailand) Tamarine Tanasugarn
- Runners-up: (Russia) Anna Chakvetadze; (Russia) Ksenia Pervak
- Score: 7–5, 6–1

Details
- Draw: 16
- Seeds: 8

Events
Singles	Doubles
← 2009 ·	PTT Pattaya Open	· 2011 →

Yaroslava Shvedova and Tamarine Tanasugarn are the defending champions, but Shvedova chose not to participate this year.
Tanasugarn partnered up with Marina Erakovic and they won in the final 7–5, 6–1, against Anna Chakvetadze and Ksenia Pervak.

== Seeds ==
1. (Australia) Anastasia Rodionova / (Russia) Arina Rodionova (semifinals)
2. (United States) Jill Craybas / (Germany) Julia Görges (semifinals)
3. (Chinese Taipei) Chang Kai-chen / (Chinese Taipei) Chuang Chia-jung (quarterfinals)
4. (United States) Carly Gullickson / (Australia) Nicole Kriz (first round)

== Draw ==
=== Key ===
- Q = Qualifier
- WC = Wild card
- LL = Lucky loser
- Alt = Alternate
- SE = Special exempt
- PR = Protected ranking
- ITF = ITF entry
- JE = Junior exempt
- w/o = Walkover
- r = Retired
- d = Defaulted
- SR = Special ranking

=== Draw ===
First round

Quarterfinals

Semifinals

Finals

1
- (Australia) An Rodionova
- (Russia) Ar Rodionova
6
6

- (Chinese Taipei) Y Chen
- (China) S Sun
4
2

1
- (Australia) An Rodionova
- (Russia) Ar Rodionova
6
6

- (Kazakhstan) S Karatantcheva
- (Australia) O Rogowska
7
4
[10]

- (Kazakhstan) S Karatantcheva
- (Australia) O Rogowska
4
2

- (Chinese Taipei) C-w Chan
- (China) Y-F Xu
6^{4}
6
[7]

1
- (Australia) An Rodionova
- (Russia) Ar Rodionova
1
4

4
- (United States) C Gullickson
- (Australia) N Kriz
2
5

- (New Zealand) M Erakovic
- (Thailand) T Tanasugarn
6
6

- (New Zealand) M Erakovic
- (Thailand) T Tanasugarn
6
7

- (New Zealand) M Erakovic
- (Thailand) T Tanasugarn
7
6

- (Russia) E Ivanova
- (Russia) E Chalova
5
3

- (Indonesia) Y Basuki
- (Japan) Y Sema
6^{2}
4

- (Indonesia) Y Basuki
- (Japan) Y Sema
7
6

- (New Zealand) M Erakovic
- (Thailand) T Tanasugarn
7
6

- (Russia) A Chakvetadze
- (Russia) K Pervak
7
6

- (Russia) A Chakvetadze
- (Russia) K Pervak
5
1

WC
- (Thailand) N Lertcheewakarn
5
1

- (Russia) A Chakvetadze
- (Russia) K Pervak
7
6

3
- (Chinese Taipei) K-c Chang
- (Chinese Taipei) C-j Chuang
w/o

3
- (Chinese Taipei) K-c Chang
- (Chinese Taipei) C-j Chuang
6^{4}
2

WC
- (Thailand) N Lertpitaksinchai

- (Russia) A Chakvetadze
- (Russia) K Pervak
6
0
[10]

- (Ukraine) Y Fedak
- (Ukraine) V Kapshay
4
6
[4]

2
- (United States) J Craybas
- (Germany) J Görges
4
6
[8]

- (Greece) A Gerasimou
- (China) Y-M Zhou
6
4
[10]

- (Greece) A Gerasimou
- (China) Y-M Zhou
6^{4}
7
[2]

- (China) X Han
- (China) C-M Ji
4
4

2
- (United States) J Craybas
- (Germany) J Görges
7
6^{5}
[10]

2
- (United States) J Craybas
- (Germany) J Görges
6
6
