= 1992 Volvo Women's Open – Doubles =

Doubles
- 1992 Volvo Women's Open

Final
- Champions: (France) Isabelle Demongeot (Commonwealth of Independent States) Natalia Medvedeva
- Runners-up: (France) Pascale Paradis-Mangon (France) Sandrine Testud
- Score: 6–1, 6–1

Details
- Draw: 16 (1Q)
- Seeds: 4

Events
Singles	Doubles
← 1991 ·	Thailand Open	· 1993 →

Nana Miyagi and Suzanna Wibowo were the defending champions, but Wibowo did not compete this year. Miyagi teamed up with Yayuk Basuki and lost in the quarterfinals to Isabelle Demongeot and Natalia Medvedeva.

Demongeot and Medvedeva won the title by defeating Pascale Paradis-Mangon and Sandrine Testud 6–1, 6–1 in the final.

== Seeds ==
1. (Germany) Claudia Porwik / (Italy) Raffaella Reggi-Concato (quarterfinals)
2. (Czechoslovakia) Petra Langrová / (Czechoslovakia) Andrea Strnadová (first round)
3. (France) Catherine Suire / (France) Catherine Tanvier (quarterfinals)
4. (France) Isabelle Demongeot / (Commonwealth of Independent States) Natalia Medvedeva (champions)

== Draw ==
=== Key ===
- Q = Qualifier
- WC = Wild card
- LL = Lucky loser
- Alt = Alternate
- SE = Special exempt
- PR = Protected ranking
- ITF = ITF entry
- JE = Junior exempt
- w/o = Walkover
- r = Retired
- d = Defaulted
- SR = Special ranking

=== Draw ===
First round
1	(Germany) C Porwik (Italy) R Reggi-Concato	5	6	6
(Australia) L Field (United Kingdom) C Wood	7	3	2
(Australia) JA Faull (New Zealand) J Richardson	7	6
(Australia) M Jaggard-Lai (Netherlands) M Oremans	5	2
4	(France) I Demongeot (Commonwealth of Independent States) N Medvedeva	6	7
(United States) C Benjamin (Belgium) S Wasserman	3	5
(United States) A Gooden (Australia) KA Guse	2	4
(Indonesia) Y Basuki (Japan) N Miyagi	6	6
Q	(Czechoslovakia) E Švíglerová (France) N van Lottum	6^{3}	2
(Japan) E Iida (Australia) K Radford	7^{7}	6
(United States) A Henricksson (Japan) N Sawamatsu	4	4
3	(France) C Suire (France) C Tanvier	6	6
(Thailand) S Duangchan (Thailand) B Sangaram	4	2
(France) P Paradis-Mangon (France) S Testud	6	6
(Japan) R Hiraki (United States) K Po	6	3	6
2	(Czechoslovakia) P Langrová (Czechoslovakia) A Strnadová	4	6	4

Quarterfinals
1	(Germany) C Porwik (Italy) R Reggi-Concato	6	1	1
(Australia) JA Faull (New Zealand) J Richardson	1	6	6
4	(France) I Demongeot (Commonwealth of Independent States) N Medvedeva	6	7
(Indonesia) Y Basuki (Japan) N Miyagi	2	5
(Japan) E Iida (Australia) K Radford	6	6
3	(France) C Suire (France) C Tanvier	4	4
(France) P Paradis-Mangon (France) S Testud	6	7
(Japan) R Hiraki (United States) K Po	4	5

Semifinals
(Australia) JA Faull (New Zealand) J Richardson	6	6^{6}	6^{2}
4	(France) I Demongeot (Commonwealth of Independent States) N Medvedeva	3	7^{8}	7^{7}
(Japan) E Iida (Australia) K Radford	2	4
(France) P Paradis-Mangon (France) S Testud	6	6

Final
4	(France) I Demongeot (Commonwealth of Independent States) N Medvedeva	6	6
(France) P Paradis-Mangon (France) S Testud	1	1
