= 1993 Volvo Women's Open =

- Date: 12–18 April
- Edition: 3rd
- Category: Tier IV
- Draw: 32S / 16D
- Prize money: $100,000
- Surface: Hard / outdoor
- Location: Pattaya, Thailand
- Venue: Dusit Resort Hotel

Champions

Singles
- (Indonesia) Yayuk Basuki

Doubles
- (United States) Cammy MacGregor; (France) Catherine Suire
← 1992 ·	Thailand Open	· 1994 →

The 1993 Volvo Women's Open was a women's tennis tournament played on outdoor hard courts at the Dusit Resort Hotel in Pattaya in Thailand that was part of Tier IV of the 1993 WTA Tour. It was the third edition of the tournament and was held from 12 April through 18 April 1993. Eighth-seeded Yayuk Basuki won the singles title, her second at the event after 1991, and earned $18,000 first-prize money.

== Finals ==
=== Singles ===
(Indonesia) Yayuk Basuki defeated (United States) Marianne Werdel 6–3, 6–1

- It was Basuki's 1st singles title of the year and the 3rd of her career.

=== Doubles ===
(United States) Cammy MacGregor / (France) Catherine Suire defeated (United States) Patty Fendick / (United States) Meredith McGrath 6–3, 7–6^{(7–3)}
