= 1991 Volvo Women's Open – Doubles =

Doubles
- 1991 Volvo Women's Open

Final
- Champions: (Japan) Nana Miyagi (Indonesia) Suzanna Wibowo
- Runners-up: (Japan) Rika Hiraki (Japan) Akemi Nishiya
- Score: 6–1, 6–4

Details
- Draw: 16
- Seeds: 4

Events
Singles	Doubles
Thailand Open	· 1992 →

In the first edition of the tournament, Nana Miyagi and Suzanna Wibowo won the title by defeating Rika Hiraki and Akemi Nishiya 6–1, 6–4 in the final.

== Seeds ==
1. (Belgium) ~~Sabine Appelmans~~ / (Japan) ~~Maya Kidowaki~~ (withdrew)
2. (Australia) Louise Field / (United States) Alysia May (semifinals)
3. (Luxembourg) Karin Kschwendt / (United States) Marianne Werdel (first round)
4. (Indonesia) Yayuk Basuki / (Australia) Kristine Radford (semifinals)

== Draw ==
=== Key ===
- Q = Qualifier
- WC = Wild card
- LL = Lucky loser
- Alt = Alternate
- SE = Special exempt
- PR = Protected ranking
- ITF = ITF entry
- JE = Junior exempt
- w/o = Walkover
- r = Retired
- d = Defaulted
- SR = Special ranking

=== Draw ===
First round
(United States) L Antonoplis (Norway) A Jönsson	6	6
WC	(Australia) R Mawdsley (Thailand) O Thampensri	4	4
(Japan) N Miyagi (Indonesia) S Wibowo	7	6
(Spain) MJ Llorca (Hong Kong) P Moreno	5	1
4	(Indonesia) Y Basuki (Australia) K Radford	6	2	6
(United Kingdom) M Javer (Peru) P Vásquez	3	6	1
(United Kingdom) S Loosemore (United States) K Steinmetz	2	3
(Netherlands) I Driehuis (Australia) A Scott	6	6
(Australia) Leisa Dunn (Australia) C Thompson	7	4	1
(Japan) R Hiraki (Japan) A Nishiya	5	6	6
(Mexico) L Novelo (United States) Betsy Somerville	7^{7}	3	7
3	(Luxembourg) K Kschwendt (United States) M Werdel	6^{3}	6	5
Q	(Japan) K Nagatsuka (Japan) H Nagano	5	5
(Australia) A Minter (New Zealand) C Toleafoa	7	7
(Australia) K Godridge (Australia) N Pratt	6	6^{9}	4
2	(Australia) L Field (United States) A May	4	7^{11}	6

Quarterfinals
(United States) L Antonoplis (Norway) A Jönsson	1	1
(Japan) N Miyagi (Indonesia) S Wibowo	6	6
4	(Indonesia) Y Basuki (Australia) K Radford	4	6	6
(Netherlands) I Driehuis (Australia) A Scott	6	3	0
(Japan) R Hiraki (Japan) A Nishiya	2	7	7^{7}
(Mexico) L Novelo (United States) Betsy Somerville	6	5	6^{5}
(Australia) A Minter (New Zealand) C Toleafoa	2	0
2	(Australia) L Field (United States) A May	6	6

Semifinals
(Japan) N Miyagi (Indonesia) S Wibowo	6	6
4	(Indonesia) Y Basuki (Australia) K Radford	3	3
(Japan) R Hiraki (Japan) A Nishiya	5	6	6
2	(Australia) L Field (United States) A May	7	3	4

Final
(Japan) N Miyagi (Indonesia) S Wibowo	6	6
(Japan) R Hiraki (Japan) A Nishiya	1	4
