= 2009 PTT Pattaya Women's Open =

2009 Pattaya Women's Open
- Date: 7–15 February
- Edition: 18th
- Category: WTA International
- Draw: 32S / 16D
- Prize money: $220,000
- Surface: Hard / outdoor
- Location: Pattaya, Thailand

Champions

Singles
- (Russia) Vera Zvonareva

Doubles
- (Kazakhstan) Yaroslava Shvedova; (Thailand) Tamarine Tanasugarn
← 2008 ·	Pattaya Women's Open	· 2010 →

The 2009 PTT Pattaya Women's Open was a women's tennis tournament played on outdoor hard courts. It was the 18th edition of the Pattaya Women's Open, and was part of the International category on the 2009 WTA Tour. It took place in Pattaya, Thailand, from 7 February through 15 February 2009.

The total prize money for the tournament was US$220,000, upgraded from last year's US$170,000 prize money.

The singles draw was headlined by Australian Open semifinalist Vera Zvonareva, Caroline Wozniacki, Dominika Cibulková. Other top players were 2007 champion Sybille Bammer, Peng Shuai, home favourite Tamarine Tanasugarn, 2006 champion Shahar Pe'er and Magdaléna Rybáriková. Vera Zvonareva won the singles title.

== Finals ==
=== Singles ===
(Russia) Vera Zvonareva defeated (India) Sania Mirza 7–5, 6–1

- It was Zvonareva's 1st singles title of the year and 8th of her career.

=== Doubles ===
(Kazakhstan) Yaroslava Shvedova / (Thailand) Tamarine Tanasugarn defeated (Ukraine) Yuliya Beygelzimer / (Russia) Vitalia Diatchenko 6–3, 6–2

== Tournament ==
The Pattaya Women's Open was held at the Dusit Resort Pattaya in Thailand on outdoor hard courts. The tournament featured two competitions, an individual or singles tournament with 32 players involved and a doubles tournament with 10 pairs. A quarter of the players in the singles draw are seeded (8 players) and 4 from the doubles, based on their world ranking, with the seeded doubles pairs receiving a bye into the second round. In the singles tournament, players have to progress through 5 rounds if they want to win the event, whereas it is one round less for doubles. Matches are best of 3 sets and can be settled by tiebreaks if necessary. The third set of the doubles tournament match is decided by a champions tiebreak.

== Entrants ==
=== Seeds ===
Dominika Cibulková was the third seed, but had to withdraw.

Athlete	Nationality	Ranking*	Seeding
Vera Zvonareva	Russia	5	1
Caroline Wozniacki	Denmark	12	2
Dominika Cibulková	Slovakia	18	3
Sybille Bammer	Austria	26	4
Peng Shuai	China	35	5
Tamarine Tanasugarn	Thailand	41	6
Shahar Pe'er	Israel	48	7
Magdaléna Rybáriková	Slovakia	51	8

- Rankings as of February 9, 2009.

=== Other entrants ===
The following players received wildcards into the main draw:

- (Thailand) Noppawan Lertcheewakarn
- (Thailand) Nicha Lertpitaksinchai
- (Japan) Kimiko Date-Krumm

The following players received entry from the qualifying draw:

- (Ukraine) Yuliya Beygelzimer
- (Russia) Vitalia Diatchenko
- (Kazakhstan) Sesil Karatantcheva
- (Croatia) Ivana Lisjak
- (Japan) Ryōko Fuda (as a lucky loser)

== Events ==
=== Singles ===
All of the seeded players progressed into the second round. Top seed Vera Zvonareva and second seed Caroline Wozniacki both recorded straight sets victories against Andreja Klepač and Chan Yung-jan respectively. Sybille Bammer, Shahar Pe'er and Magdaléna Rybáriková also progressed, while Peng Shuai won by default when her opponent Mara Santangelo had to retire with illness in the second set. The only seeded player from Thailand, Tamarine Tanasugarn (6) beat Akgul Amanmuradova. The other two home players, junior number one and 2008 Wimbledon girls singles finalist Noppawan Lertcheewakarn and Nicha Lertpitaksinchai both lost in the first round, against Pe'er and Sania Mirza respectively.

In the second round, Bammer was the sole seed to exit the tournament, losing to Russian Vera Dushevina. Zvonareva beat Yaroslava Shvedova, Peng won her match against Galina Voskoboeva, Tanasugarn defeated Neuza Silva while Pe'er and Rybáriková both defeated qualifiers. Second seed Wozniacki recovered from losing the first set on a tiebreak to level the match before her opponent, Ksenia Pervak, became the third player to withdraw from the tournament with injury or illness. Mirza was the only other non-seeded player to reach the quarter-finals by beating qualifier Vitalia Diatchenko.

In two all-seeded quarterfinal ties, Zvonareva defeated Peng 6–2, 6–3 but Wozniacki, the second seed, was beaten 6–4, 6–1 by Rybáriková who was seeded eighth. Sixth seed Tanasugarn also lost her match 7–5, 6–4 against Mirza but Pe'er made sure that there would be three seeds in the semi-finals by defeating Dushevina 6–4, 4–6, 6–2.

The first semifinal took to the court on Saturday, and saw eighth seed Rybáriková take on Mirza. Unseeded Mirza comfortably took the first set 6–4. In the second set, Mirza failed to serve out the match, while 5–3 and 30–15 up. Rybáriková then went on to win the following four games to take the set 7–5 and force a decider. The third set however was again one-sided, in Mirza's favour. Mirza closed out the set 6–1 and won the match with the scoreline 6–4, 5–7, 6–1.

=== Doubles ===
In a small tournament with only 10 pairs competing, the top four seeds received byes into the second round. Thai pair Nungnadda Wannasuk and Varatchaya Wongteanchai progressed into the second round where they faced second seeds Yaroslava Shvedova and another Thai player Tamarine Tanasugarn, who they lost to 6–0, 6–3. Top-seeded Mirza and Santangelo qualified for the semi-finals at the expense of Elena Bovina and Ksenia Pervak. Amandurova and Chuang Chia-jung overcame Ryōko Fuda. Fourth seeds Klepač and Urszula Radwańska had to withdraw before their second round match with Yuliya Beygelzimer and Vitalia Diatchenko.

In the semi-finals, Amanmuradova and Chuang, the top seeds lost to Beygelzimer and Diatchenko 6–2, 6–4, missing out on a place in the final.
