= 1992 Volvo Women's Open – Singles =

Singles
- 1992 Volvo Women's Open

Final
- Champion: (Belgium) Sabine Appelmans
- Runner-up: (Czechoslovakia) Andrea Strnadová
- Score: 7–5, 3–6, 7–5

Details
- Draw: 32 (4Q/2LL)
- Seeds: 8

Events
| Singles | Doubles |
| ← 1991 · | Thailand Open | · 1993 → |

Yayuk Basuki was the defending champion, but lost in the quarterfinals to Pascale Paradis-Mangon.

Sabine Appelmans won the title by defeating Andrea Strnadová 7–5, 3–6, 7–5 in the final.

== Seeds ==
1. (Belgium) Sabine Appelmans (champion)
2. (Japan) Naoko Sawamatsu (second round)
3. (Commonwealth of Independent States) Natalia Medvedeva (semifinals)
4. (Indonesia) Yayuk Basuki (semifinals)
5. (Czechoslovakia) Andrea Strnadová (final)
6. (Sweden) Catarina Lindqvist (quarterfinals)
7. (France) Pascale Paradis-Mangon (quarterfinals)
8. (France) Isabelle Demongeot (first round)

== Draw ==
=== Key ===
- Q = Qualifier
- WC = Wild card
- LL = Lucky loser
- Alt = Alternate
- SE = Special exempt
- PR = Protected ranking
- ITF = ITF entry
- JE = Junior exempt
- w/o = Walkover
- r = Retired
- d = Defaulted
- SR = Special ranking

=== Finals ===
Semifinals
1 | (Belgium) Sabine Appelmans | 6 | 6
3 | (Commonwealth of Independent States) Natalia Medvedeva | 4 | 3
4 | (Indonesia) Yayuk Basuki | 6 | 2 | 2
5 | (Czechoslovakia) Andrea Strnadová | 4 | 6 | 6

Final
1 | (Belgium) Sabine Appelmans | 7 | 3 | 7
5 | (Czechoslovakia) Andrea Strnadová | 5 | 6 | 5

=== Top half ===
First round
1 | (Belgium) S Appelmans | 6 | 6
(China) F Li | 2 | 4
(Italy) R Reggi-Concato | 6 | 2 | 6
(Czechoslovakia) P Langrová | 3 | 6 | 4
(Czechoslovakia) E Švíglerová | 6 | 6
(Netherlands) C Wegink | 3 | 4
(France) C Suire | 6^{4} | 2
6 | (Sweden) C Lindqvist | 7^{7} | 6
3 | (Commonwealth of Independent States) N Medvedeva | 6 | 6
Q | (Canada) M Drake | 1 | 2
(Belgium) D Monami | 3 | 3
LL | (Belgium) S Wasserman | 6 | 6
LL | (Chinese Taipei) S-t Wang | 6 | 7
(United States) K Po | 4 | 5
(Germany) C Porwik | 6 | 6
8 | (France) I Demongeot | 4 | 4

Second round
1 | (Belgium) S Appelmans | 4 | 6 | 6
(Italy) R Reggi-Concato | 6 | 1 | 3
(Czechoslovakia) E Švíglerová | 6^{6} | 3
6 | (Sweden) C Lindqvist | 7^{8} | 6
3 | (Commonwealth of Independent States) N Medvedeva | 6 | 7
LL | (Belgium) S Wasserman | 2 | 5
LL | (Chinese Taipei) S-t Wang | 6 | 6
(Germany) C Porwik | 3 | 4

Quarterfinals
1 | (Belgium) S Appelmans | 6 | 6
6 | (Sweden) C Lindqvist | 2 | 4
3 | (Commonwealth of Independent States) N Medvedeva | 6 | 6
LL | (Chinese Taipei) S-t Wang | 2 | 4

Semifinals
1 | (Belgium) S Appelmans | 6 | 6
3 | (Commonwealth of Independent States) N Medvedeva | 4 | 3

=== Bottom half ===
First round
7 | (France) P Paradis-Mangon | 6 | 6
(New Zealand) J Richardson | 4 | 4
(Australia) R Stubbs | 6 | 7
Q | (France) A Fusai | 4 | 5
(Australia) J Byrne | 1 | 3
(United Kingdom) M Javer | 6 | 6
(France) N van Lottum | 5 | 6 | 5
4 | (Indonesia) Y Basuki | 7 | 2 | 7
5 | (Czechoslovakia) A Strnadová | 6 | 6
(Japan) R Hiraki | 2 | 1
(France) S Testud | 6 | 6
(Netherlands) M Oremans | 4 | 4
(Thailand) B Sangaram | 0 | 2
Q | (Netherlands) S Rottier | 6 | 6
Q | (Japan) T Takagi | 2 | 1
2 | (Japan) N Sawamatsu | 6 | 6

Second round
7 | (France) P Paradis-Mangon | 7^{7} | 3 | 6
(Australia) R Stubbs | 6^{5} | 6 | 2
(United Kingdom) M Javer | 4 | 3
4 | (Indonesia) Y Basuki | 6 | 6
5 | (Czechoslovakia) A Strnadová | 6 | 6
(France) S Testud | 3 | 3
Q | (Netherlands) S Rottier | 6 | 7
2 | (Japan) N Sawamatsu | 1 | 5

Quarterfinals
7 | (France) P Paradis-Mangon | 0 | 1
4 | (Indonesia) Y Basuki | 6 | 6
5 | (Czechoslovakia) A Strnadová | 6 | 6
Q | (Netherlands) S Rottier | 0 | 1

Semifinals
4 | (Indonesia) Y Basuki | 6 | 2 | 2
5 | (Czechoslovakia) A Strnadová | 4 | 6 | 6
