= 1997 Volvo Women's Open =

- Date: 17–23 November
- Edition: 7th
- Category: Tier IV
- Draw: 32S / 16D
- Prize money: $107,500
- Surface: Hard / outdoor
- Location: Pattaya, Thailand

Champions

Singles
- (Slovakia) Henrieta Nagyová

Doubles
- (Australia) Kristine Kunce / (United States) Corina Morariu
← 1996 ·	Thailand Open	· 1998 →

The 1997 Volvo Women's Open was a women's tennis tournament played on outdoor hard courts in Pattaya in Thailand that was part of Tier IV of the 1997 WTA Tour. It was the seventh edition of the tournament and was held from 17 November through 23 November 1997. Fourth-seeded Henrieta Nagyová won the singles title.

== Finals ==
=== Singles ===
(Slovakia) Henrieta Nagyová defeated (Belgium) Dominique Van Roost 7–5, 6–7, 7–5

- It was Nagyová's only singles title of the year and the 2nd of her career.

=== Doubles ===
(Australia) Kristine Kunce / (United States) Corina Morariu defeated (Argentina) Florencia Labat / (Belgium) Dominique Van Roost 6–3, 6–4

- It was Kunce's 2nd and last doubles title of the year and the 6th and last of her career. It was Morariu's only doubles title of the year and the 1st of her career.
