= 1991 Volvo Women's Open =

- Date: 15–21 April
- Edition: 1st
- Category: Tier V
- Draw: 32S / 16D
- Prize money: $75,000
- Surface: Hard / outdoor
- Location: Pattaya City, Thailand
- Venue: Dusit Resort Hotel

Champions

Singles
- (Indonesia) Yayuk Basuki

Doubles
- (Japan) Nana Miyagi / (Indonesia) Suzanna Wibowo
| Thailand Open | · 1992 → |

The 1991 Volvo Women's Open was a women's tennis tournament played on outdoor hard courts at the Dusit Resort Hotel in Pattaya City in Thailand that was part of Tier V of the 1991 WTA Tour. It was the inaugural edition of the tournament and was held from 15 April through 21 April 1991. Unseeded Yayuk Basuki won the singles title and earned $13,500 first-prize money.

== Finals ==
=== Singles ===
(Indonesia) Yayuk Basuki defeated (Japan) Naoko Sawamatsu 6–2, 6–2

- It was Basuki's first singles title of her career.

=== Doubles ===
(Japan) Nana Miyagi / (Indonesia) Suzanna Wibowo defeated (Japan) Rika Hiraki / (Japan) Akemi Nishiya 6–1, 6–4
