= 1994 Volvo Women's Open =

- Date: 11–17 April
- Edition: 4th
- Category: Tier IV
- Draw: 32S / 16D
- Prize money: $100,000
- Surface: Hard / outdoor
- Location: Pattaya, Thailand
- Venue: Dusit Resort Hotel

Champions

Singles
- (Belgium) Sabine Appelmans

Doubles
- (United States) Patty Fendick / (United States) Meredith McGrath
← 1993 ·	Thailand Open	· 1995 →

The 1994 Volvo Women's Open was a women's tennis tournament played on outdoor hard courts at the Dusit Resort Hotel in Pattaya in Thailand that was part of Tier IV of the 1994 WTA Tour. It was the fourth edition of the tournament and was held from 11 April through 17 April 1994. First-seeded Sabine Appelmans won the singles title, her second at the event after 1992, and earned $18,000 first-prize money.

== Finals ==
=== Singles ===
(Belgium) Sabine Appelmans defeated (United States) Patty Fendick 6–7^{(5–7)}, 7–6^{(7–5)}, 6–2

- It was Appelmans' 2nd singles title of the year and the 5th of her career.

=== Doubles ===
(United States) Patty Fendick / (United States) Meredith McGrath defeated (Indonesia) Yayuk Basuki / (Japan) Nana Miyagi 7–6^{(7–0)}, 3–6, 6–3
