= 1994 Volvo Women's Open – Doubles =

Doubles
- 1994 Volvo Women's Open

Final
- Champions: (United States) Patty Fendick (United States) Meredith McGrath
- Runners-up: (Indonesia) Yayuk Basuki (Japan) Nana Miyagi
- Score: 7–6^{(7–0)}, 3–6, 6–3

Details
- Draw: 16 (1Q/1WC)
- Seeds: 4

Events
Singles	Doubles
← 1993 ·	Thailand Open	· 1995 →

Cammy MacGregor and Catherine Suire were the defending champions, but none competed this year.

Patty Fendick and Meredith McGrath won the title by defeating Yayuk Basuki and Nana Miyagi 7–6^{(7–0)}, 3–6, 6–3 in the final.

== Seeds ==
1. (United States) Patty Fendick / (United States) Meredith McGrath (champions)
2. (Australia) Jenny Byrne / (Australia) Rachel McQuillan (semifinals)
3. (Indonesia) Yayuk Basuki / (Japan) Nana Miyagi (final)
4. (United States) Nicole Arendt / (Australia) Kristine Radford (semifinals)

== Draw ==
=== Key ===
- Q = Qualifier
- WC = Wild card
- LL = Lucky loser
- Alt = Alternate
- SE = Special exempt
- PR = Protected ranking
- ITF = ITF entry
- JE = Junior exempt
- w/o = Walkover
- r = Retired
- d = Defaulted
- SR = Special ranking

=== Draw ===
First round
1	(United States) P Fendick (United States) M McGrath	6	6
LL	(Australia) L Field (United States) A Henricksson	3	4
WC	(Thailand) Siriluk Mingmolee (Thailand) B Sangaram	0	2
(France) A Dechaume-Balleret (Argentina) F Labat	6	6
4	(United States) N Arendt (Australia) K Radford	5	6	6
(Russia) N Egorova (Russia) S Parkhomenko	7	0	3
(United States) L Harvey-Wild (Czech Republic) A Strnadová	6	6
(Australia) K Godridge (France) S Testud	3	4
(United States) E deLone (Australia) N Pratt	6^{6}	6	6
Q	(Czech Republic) P Kučová (Czech Republic) J Pospíšilová	7^{8}	4	4
(Australia) M Jaggard-Lai (United States) M Werdel	2	2
3	(Indonesia) Y Basuki (Japan) N Miyagi	6	6
(Canada) M Bernard (Canada) C Delisle	2	3
(China) F Li (Germany) C Kohde-Kilsch	6	6
(United States) S Reece (United States) J Steven	2	3
2	(Australia) J Byrne (Australia) R McQuillan	6	6

Quarterfinals
1	(United States) P Fendick (United States) M McGrath	6	6
(France) A Dechaume-Balleret (Argentina) F Labat	3	3
4	(United States) N Arendt (Australia) K Radford	1	6	6
(United States) L Harvey-Wild (Czech Republic) A Strnadová	6	2	4
(United States) E deLone (Australia) N Pratt	4	0
3	(Indonesia) Y Basuki (Japan) N Miyagi	6	6
(China) F Li (Germany) C Kohde-Kilsch	2	2
2	(Australia) J Byrne (Australia) R McQuillan	6	6

Semifinals
1	(United States) P Fendick (United States) M McGrath	6	6
4	(United States) N Arendt (Australia) K Radford	3	1
3	(Indonesia) Y Basuki (Japan) N Miyagi	6	7
2	(Australia) J Byrne (Australia) R McQuillan	4	5

Final
1	(United States) P Fendick (United States) M McGrath	7^{7}	3	6
3	(Indonesia) Y Basuki (Japan) N Miyagi	6^{0}	6	3
