= 1995 Volvo Women's Open =

- Date: 13–19 November
- Edition: 5th
- Category: Tier IV
- Draw: 32S / 16D
- Prize money: $107,500
- Surface: Hard / outdoor
- Location: Pattaya, Thailand

Champions

Singles
- (Austria) Barbara Paulus

Doubles
- (Canada) Jill Hetherington / (Australia) Kristine Radford
← 1994 ·	Thailand Open	· 1996 →

The 1995 Volvo Women's Open was a women's tennis tournament played on outdoor hard courts in Pattaya in Thailand that was part of Tier IV of the 1995 WTA Tour. It was the fifth edition of the tournament and was held from 13 November through 19 November 1995. First-seeded Barbara Paulus won the singles title.

== Finals ==
=== Singles ===
(Austria) Barbara Paulus defeated (China) Jing-Qian Yi 6–4, 6–3

- It was Paulus' 2nd singles title of the year and the 4th of her career.

=== Doubles ===
(Canada) Jill Hetherington / (Australia) Kristine Radford defeated (Australia) Kristin Godridge / (Japan) Nana Miyagi 2–6, 6–4, 6–3
