= 1991 Volvo Women's Open – Singles =

Singles
- 1991 Volvo Women's Open

Final
- Champion: (Indonesia) Yayuk Basuki
- Runner-up: (Japan) Naoko Sawamatsu
- Score: 6–2, 6–2

Details
- Draw: 32 (2WC/4Q)
- Seeds: 8

Events
Singles	Doubles
Thailand Open	· 1992 →

In the first edition of the tournament, Yayuk Basuki won the title by defeating Naoko Sawamatsu 6–2, 6–2 in the final.

== Seeds ==
1. (Belgium) Sabine Appelmans (first round, retired)
2. (Japan) Naoko Sawamatsu (final)
3. (Sweden) Catarina Lindqvist (second round)
4. (United States) Marianne Werdel (semifinals)
5. (Australia) Anne Minter (first round)
6. (Luxembourg) Karin Kschwendt (quarterfinals)
7. (United Kingdom) Monique Javer (quarterfinals)
8. (United Kingdom) Sarah Loosemore (quarterfinals)

== Draw ==
=== Key ===
- Q = Qualifier
- WC = Wild card
- LL = Lucky loser
- Alt = Alternate
- SE = Special exempt
- PR = Protected ranking
- ITF = ITF entry
- JE = Junior exempt
- w/o = Walkover
- r = Retired
- d = Defaulted
- SR = Special ranking

=== Finals ===
Semifinals
WC	(Japan) Rika Hiraki	6	1	2
(Indonesia) Yayuk Basuki	3	6	6
4	(United States) Marianne Werdel	1	3
2	(Japan) Naoko Sawamatsu	6	6

Final
(Indonesia) Yayuk Basuki	6	6
2	(Japan) Naoko Sawamatsu	2	2

=== Top half ===
First round
1	(Belgium) S Appelmans	6	0	3^{r}
(Australia) K Radford	1	6	5
WC	(Japan) R Hiraki	6^{4}	7	6
(Indonesia) S Wibowo	7^{7}	5	1
(New Zealand) C Toleafoa	7	2	1
Q	(Norway) A Jönsson	5	6	6
(Netherlands) M Oremans	3	2
8	(United Kingdom) S Loosemore	6	6
3	(Sweden) C Lindqvist	6	6^{6}	6
Q	(Mexico) L Novelo	3	7^{8}	0
(Australia) L Field	2	5
(Indonesia) Y Basuki	6	7
(Japan) A Nishiya	2	5
(Japan) N Miyagi	6	7
(Japan) M Kidowaki	1	3
6	(Luxembourg) K Kschwendt	6	6

Second round
(Australia) K Radford	3	1
WC	(Japan) R Hiraki	6	6
Q	(Norway) A Jönsson	6	2	3
8	(United Kingdom) S Loosemore	2	6	6
3	(Sweden) C Lindqvist	4	2
(Indonesia) Y Basuki	6	6
(Japan) N Miyagi	3	4
6	(Luxembourg) K Kschwendt	6	6

Quarterfinals
WC	(Japan) R Hiraki	6	6
8	(United Kingdom) S Loosemore	0	2
(Indonesia) Y Basuki	5	6	6
6	(Luxembourg) K Kschwendt	7	3	4

Semifinals
WC	(Japan) R Hiraki	6	1	2
(Indonesia) Y Basuki	3	6	6

=== Bottom half ===
First round
5	(Australia) A Minter	1	5
(Japan) T Takagi	6	7
(Japan) M Miyauchi	4	6	6
Q	(Japan) E Okagawa	6	1	3
(Australia) JA Faull	7^{7}	4	6
(Peru) P Vásquez	6^{3}	6	1
Q	(Netherlands) I Driehuis	1	2
4	(United States) M Werdel	6	6
7	(United Kingdom) M Javer	6	7^{9}
(United States) A May	1	6^{7}
(Japan) M Endo	2	3
(Australia) K Godridge	6	6
WC	(Thailand) O Thampensri	1	4
(Netherlands) P Kamstra	6	6
(Australia) N Pratt	1	6	0
2	(Japan) N Sawamatsu	6	2	6

Second round
(Japan) T Takagi	4	3
(Japan) M Miyauchi	6	6
(Australia) JA Faull	4	0
4	(United States) M Werdel	6	6
7	(United Kingdom) M Javer	6	6
(Australia) K Godridge	2	0
(Netherlands) P Kamstra	6	0^{r}
2	(Japan) N Sawamatsu	4	5

Quarterfinals
(Japan) M Miyauchi	6^{3}	0
4	(United States) M Werdel	7^{7}	6
7	(United Kingdom) M Javer	2	3
2	(Japan) N Sawamatsu	6	6

Semifinals
4	(United States) M Werdel	1	3
2	(Japan) N Sawamatsu	6	6
