= 1993 Volvo Women's Open – Doubles =

Doubles
- 1993 Volvo Women's Open

Final
- Champions: (United States) Cammy MacGregor; (France) Catherine Suire
- Runners-up: (United States) Patty Fendick; (United States) Meredith McGrath
- Score: 6–3, 7–6^{(7–3)}

Details
- Draw: 16
- Seeds: 4

Events
Singles	Doubles
← 1992 ·	Thailand Open	· 1994 →

Isabelle Demongeot and Natalia Medvedeva were the defending champions, but none competed this year.

Cammy MacGregor and Catherine Suire won the title by defeating Patty Fendick and Meredith McGrath 6–3, 7–6^{(7–3)} in the final.

== Seeds ==
1. (Indonesia) Yayuk Basuki / (Japan) Nana Miyagi (first round)
2. (Slovakia) Karina Habšudová / (Germany) Claudia Porwik (semifinals)
3. (Australia) Michelle Jaggard-Lai / (Australia) Nicole Provis (first round)
4. (Australia) Jo-Anne Faull / (Australia) Angie Woolcock (first round)

== Draw ==
=== Key ===
- Q = Qualifier
- WC = Wild card
- LL = Lucky loser
- Alt = Alternate
- SE = Special exempt
- PR = Protected ranking
- ITF = ITF entry
- JE = Junior exempt
- w/o = Walkover
- r = Retired
- d = Defaulted
- SR = Special ranking

=== Draw ===
First round

Quarterfinals

Semifinals

Final

1
- (Indonesia) Y Basuki
- (Japan) N Miyagi
6
4
4

(United States) C MacGregor
(France) C Suire
3
6
6

(United States) C MacGregor
(France) C Suire
6
6

(United States) A Grossman
(Australia) N Pratt
6
6

- (United States) A Grossman
- (Australia) N Pratt
3
4

- (United States) C Cunningham
- (United States) M Werdel
3
3

(United States) C MacGregor
(France) C Suire
3
6
6

4
- (Australia) JA Faull
- (Australia) A Woolcock
2
1

- (France) P Paradis-Mangon
- (France) S Testud
6
1
2

(France) P Paradis-Mangon
(France) S Testud
6
6

(France) P Paradis-Mangon
(France) S Testud
5
6
6

- (Czech Republic) E Švíglerová
- (Finland) P Thorén
3
3

- (Australia) J Byrne
- (United States) A Henricksson
7
3
1

(Australia) J Byrne
(United States) A Henricksson
6
6

(United States) C MacGregor
(France) C Suire
6
7^{7}

(Japan) M Kidowaki
(United States) H Ludloff
6
6

- (United States) P Fendick
- (United States) M McGrath
3
6^{3}

WC
- (Thailand) B Sangaram
- (United States) S Sureephong
2
1

- (Japan) M Kidowaki
- (United States) H Ludloff
6
0
1

(United States) P Fendick
(United States) M McGrath
6
6

(United States) P Fendick
(United States) M McGrath
3
6
6

3
- (Australia) M Jaggard-Lai
- (Australia) N Provis
1
2

(United States) P Fendick
(United States) M McGrath
6
6

- (United States) N Arendt
- (Australia) K Radford
2
4

2
- (Slovakia) K Habšudová
- (Germany) C Porwik
4
4

Q
(Netherlands) K Boogert
(Belgium) N Feber
6
6

Q
- (Netherlands) K Boogert
- (Belgium) N Feber
4
4

- (Netherlands) M Oremans
- (Germany) W Probst
4
4

2
(Slovakia) K Habšudová
(Germany) C Porwik
6
6

2
(Slovakia) K Habšudová
(Germany) C Porwik
6
6
