= 1992 Volvo Women's Open =

- Date: 13–19 April
- Edition: 2nd
- Category: Tier V
- Draw: 32S / 16D
- Prize money: $100,000
- Surface: Hard / outdoor
- Location: Pattaya City, Thailand
- Venue: Dusit Resort Hotel

Champions

Singles
- (Germany) Sabine Appelmans

Doubles
- (France) Isabelle Demongeot (Commonwealth of Independent States) Natalia Medvedeva
← 1991 ·	Thailand Open	· 1993 →

The 1992 Volvo Women's Open was a women's tennis tournament played on outdoor hard courts at the Dusit Resort Hotel in Pattaya City in Thailand that was part of Tier V of the 1992 WTA Tour. It was the second edition of the tournament and was held from 13 April through 19 April 1992. Eighth-seeded Sabine Appelmans won the singles title and earned $18,000 first-prize money.

== Finals ==
=== Singles ===
(Belgium) Sabine Appelmans defeated (Czechoslovakia) Andrea Strnadová 7–5, 3–6, 7–5

- It was Appelmans' 1st singles title of the year and the 3rd of her career.

=== Doubles ===
(France) Isabelle Demongeot / (Commonwealth of Independent States) Natalia Medvedeva defeated (France) Pascale Paradis-Mangon / (France) Sandrine Testud 6–1, 6–1
