= 2008 Pattaya Women's Open =

- Date: 2–10 February
- Edition: 17th
- Category: Tier IV Series
- Draw: 32S / 16D
- Prize money: $170,000
- Surface: Hard / outdoor
- Location: Pattaya, Thailand

Champions

Singles
- (Poland) Agnieszka Radwańska

Doubles
- (Chinese Taipei) Yung-jan Chan / (Chinese Taipei) Chia-jung Chuang
- Pattaya Women's Open

The 2008 Pattaya Women's Open was a women's tennis tournament played on outdoor hard courts. It was the 17th edition of the Pattaya Women's Open, and was part of the Tier IV Series of the 2008 WTA Tour. It took place in Pattaya, Thailand, from 2 February through 10 February 2008. First-seeded Agnieszka Radwańska won the singles title and earned $25,650 first-prize money.

== Finals ==
=== Singles ===
(Poland) Agnieszka Radwańska defeated (United States) Jill Craybas, 6–2, 1–6, 7–6^{(7–4)}

- It was Radwańska's 1st singles title of the year, and the 2nd of her career.

=== Doubles ===
(Chinese Taipei) Yung-jan Chan / (Chinese Taipei) Chia-jung Chuang defeated (Chinese Taipei) Su-wei Hsieh / (United States) Vania King, 6–4, 6–3
