= 1995 Volvo Women's Open – Singles =

Singles
- 1995 Volvo Women's Open

Final
- Champion: (Austria) Barbara Paulus
- Runner-up: (China) Yi Jing-Qian
- Score: 6–4, 6–3

Details
- Draw: 32
- Seeds: 8

Events
Singles	Doubles
- Thailand Open

Sabine Appelmans was the defending champion, but did not compete this year.

Barbara Paulus won the title by defeating Yi Jing-Qian 6–4, 6–3 in the final.

== Seeds ==
1. (Austria) Barbara Paulus (champion)
2. (Chinese Taipei) Wang Shi-ting (quarterfinals)
3. (Germany) Sabine Hack (first round)
4. (Italy) Rita Grande (semifinals)
5. (Australia) Rachel McQuillan (first round)
6. (South Korea) Park Sung-hee (second round)
7. (Czech Republic) Ludmila Richterová (first round)
8. (Jamaica) Iwalani McCalla (first round)

== Draw ==
Key

- Q = Qualifier
- WC = Wild card
- LL = Lucky loser
- Alt = Alternate
- ITF = ITF entry
- PR = Protected ranking
- SR = Special ranking
- SE = Special exempt
- JE = Junior exempt
- JR = Junior Accelerator Programme entrant
- CO = College Accelerator Programme entrant
- NG = Next Gen Accelerator Program entrant
- w/o = Walkover
- r = Retired
- d = Defaulted

=== Finals ===
Semifinals
1	(Austria) Barbara Paulus	7	6
4	(Italy) Rita Grande	5	4
(China) Yi Jing-Qian	7	6
(Japan) Naoko Kijimuta	5	3

Final
1	(Austria) Barbara Paulus	6	6
(China) Yi Jing-Qian	4	3

=== Top half ===
First round
1	(Austria) B Paulus	6	4	7
(Germany) C Porwik	2	6	5
(China) F Li	7	1	2
(Japan) N Miyagi	6	6	6
(Austria) P Schwarz	6	4	4
(Germany) S Meier	4	6	6
Q	(Poland) A Olsza	2	6	6
7	(Czech Republic) L Richterová	6	2	3
4	(Italy) R Grande	7	6
WC	(Thailand) T Tanasugarn	6	4
(Slovenia) T Križan	2	4
(Slovakia) J Husárová	6	6
(Australia) K Godridge	6	3	4
(Belgium) N Feber	2	6	6
(Venezuela) M Vento	6	6
6	(Australia) R McQuillan	2	4

Second round
1	(Austria) B Paulus	6	4	6
(Japan) N Miyagi	4	6	3
(Germany) S Meier	3	6	2
Q	(Poland) A Olsza	6	4	6
4	(Italy) R Grande	6	6
(Slovakia) J Husárová	2	2
(Belgium) N Feber	3	5
(Venezuela) M Vento	6	7

Quarterfinals
1	(Austria) B Paulus	6	2	6
Q	(Poland) A Olsza	2	6	4
4	(Italy) R Grande	7	4	6
(Venezuela) M Vento	5	6	1

Semifinals
1	(Austria) B Paulus	7	6
4	(Italy) R Grande	5	4

=== Bottom half ===
First round
LL	(Jamaica) I McCalla	4	6
(China) J-Q Yi	6	7
LL	(Japan) K Shibata	2	4
(Ukraine) O Lugina	6	6
(Hong Kong) M Tang	6	7
(United States) J Watanabe	3	6
Q	(China) L-L Chen	6	6
3	(Germany) S Hack	4	2
6	(South Korea) S-H Park	7	6
WC	(Thailand) S Duangchan	5	3
(Japan) N Kijimuta	3	6	6
Q	(South Korea) M-R Jeon	6	1	2
WC	(Thailand) B Sangaram	1	0
(Romania) C Cristea	6	6
LL	(Japan) H Mochizuki	1	4
2	(Chinese Taipei) S-T Wang	6	6

Second round
(China) J-Q Yi	7	6	6
(Ukraine) O Lugina	6	7	2
(Hong Kong) M Tang	7	7
Q	(China) L-L Chen	6	5
6	(South Korea) S-H Park	3	6	2
(Japan) N Kijimuta	6	3	6
(Romania) C Cristea	3	4
2	(Chinese Taipei) S-T Wang	6	6

Quarterfinals
(China) J-Q Yi	6	3	6
(Hong Kong) M Tang	3	6	2
(Japan) N Kijimuta	6	4	6
2	(Chinese Taipei) S-T Wang	4	6	4

Semifinals
(China) J-Q Yi	7	6
(Japan) N Kijimuta	5	3
