= 2010 PTT Pattaya Open =

- Date: 7–14 February
- Edition: 19th
- Category: WTA International
- Draw: 32S / 16D
- Prize money: $220,000
- Surface: Hard / outdoor
- Location: Pattaya, Thailand
- Venue: Dusit Thani Hotel

Champions

Singles
- (Russia) Vera Zvonareva

Doubles
- (New Zealand) Marina Erakovic; (Thailand) Tamarine Tanasugarn
← 2009 ·	PTT Pattaya Open	· 2011 →

The 2010 PTT Pattaya Open was a women's professional tennis tournament played on outdoor hard courts. It was the 19th edition of the PTT Pattaya Open (formerly known as the Pattaya Women's Open) and was part of the International category on the 2010 WTA Tour. It took place at Dusit Thani Hotel in Pattaya, Thailand from 7 February through 14 February 2010.

The top two seeds were the defending champion Vera Zvonareva, Wimbledon quarterfinalist Sabine Lisicki. Vera Dushevina, 2007 champion Sybille Bammer and home favourite Tamarine Tanasugarn competed too.

First-seeded Vera Zvonareva won her second consecutive singles title at the event and earned $37,000 first-prize money.

== Finals ==
=== Singles ===
(Russia) Vera Zvonareva defeated (Thailand) Tamarine Tanasugarn, 6–4, 6–4

- It was Zvonareva's first title of the year, 10th of her career, and her second consecutive title at the event.

=== Doubles ===
(New Zealand) Marina Erakovic / (Thailand) Tamarine Tanasugarn defeated (Russia) Anna Chakvetadze / (Russia) Ksenia Pervak, 7–5, 6–1

== WTA entrants ==
=== Seeds ===
Country	Player	Rank^{1}	Seed
RUS	Vera Zvonareva	14	1
GER	Sabine Lisicki	25	2
RUS	Vera Dushevina	40	3
KAZ	Yaroslava Shvedova	48	4
AUT	Sybille Bammer	50	5
IND	Sania Mirza	59	6
JPN	Kimiko Date-Krumm	62	7
GER	Julia Görges	67	8

- ^{1} Rankings as of February 1, 2010.

=== Other entrants ===
The following players received wildcards into the main draw:

- (Thailand) Noppawan Lertcheewakarn
- (Thailand) Suchanan Viratprasert
- (Thailand) Varatchaya Wongteanchai

The following players received entry from the qualifying draw:

- (Greece) Anna Gerasimou
- (New Zealand) Sacha Jones
- (Thailand) Nudnida Luangnam
- (China) Zhou Yi-Miao
