= Tamarine Tanasugarn =

Thai tennis player (born 1977)

Tamarine Tanasugarn แทมมารีน ธนสุกาญจน์
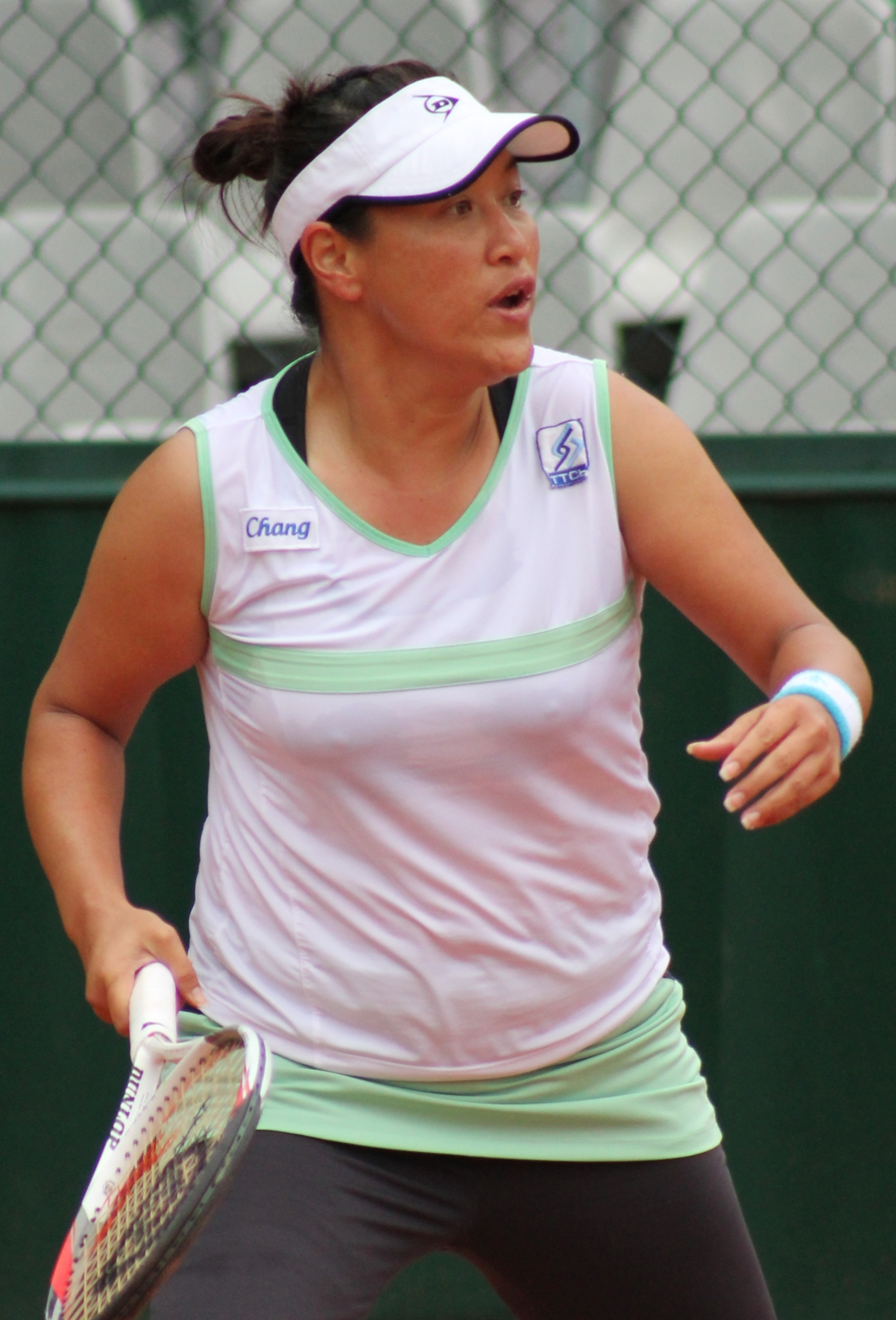
- Tanasugarn at the 2013 French Open
- Country (sports): Thailand
- Residence: Bangkok, Thailand
- Born: 24 May 1977 (age 49) Los Angeles, United States
- Height: 1.65 m (5 ft 5 in)
- Turned pro: 1994
- Retired: 2020 (2016 in singles)
- Plays: Right (two-handed backhand)
- Prize money: US$ 3,491,770

Singles
- Career record: 563–436
- Career titles: 4
- Highest ranking: No. 19 (13 May 2002)

Grand Slam singles results
- Australian Open: 4R (1998)
- French Open: 3R (2002)
- Wimbledon: QF (2008)
- US Open: 4R (2003)

Other tournaments
- Olympic Games: 2R (2000)

Doubles
- Career record: 308–271
- Career titles: 8
- Highest ranking: No. 15 (13 September 2004)

Grand Slam doubles results
- Australian Open: 3R (2000)
- French Open: 3R (2012)
- Wimbledon: SF (2011)
- US Open: QF (2004)

Other doubles tournaments
- Olympic Games: QF (1996, 2000)

Grand Slam mixed doubles results
- Wimbledon: 2R (2009)

Team competitions
- Fed Cup: 52–27
- Hopman Cup: F (2000)

Tamarine Tanasugarn

Military service
- Allegiance: Thailand
- Branch/service: Royal Thai Police
- Rank: Police Lieutenant

Tamarine Tanasugarn (Thai: แทมมารีน ธนสุกาญจน์, RTGS: Thaemmarin Thanasukan, [tʰɛːmmāːrīːn tʰánásùkāːn]; born 24 May 1977) is a Thai former tennis player. Born in Los Angeles, she turned professional in 1994, and has been in the top 20 in both singles and doubles.

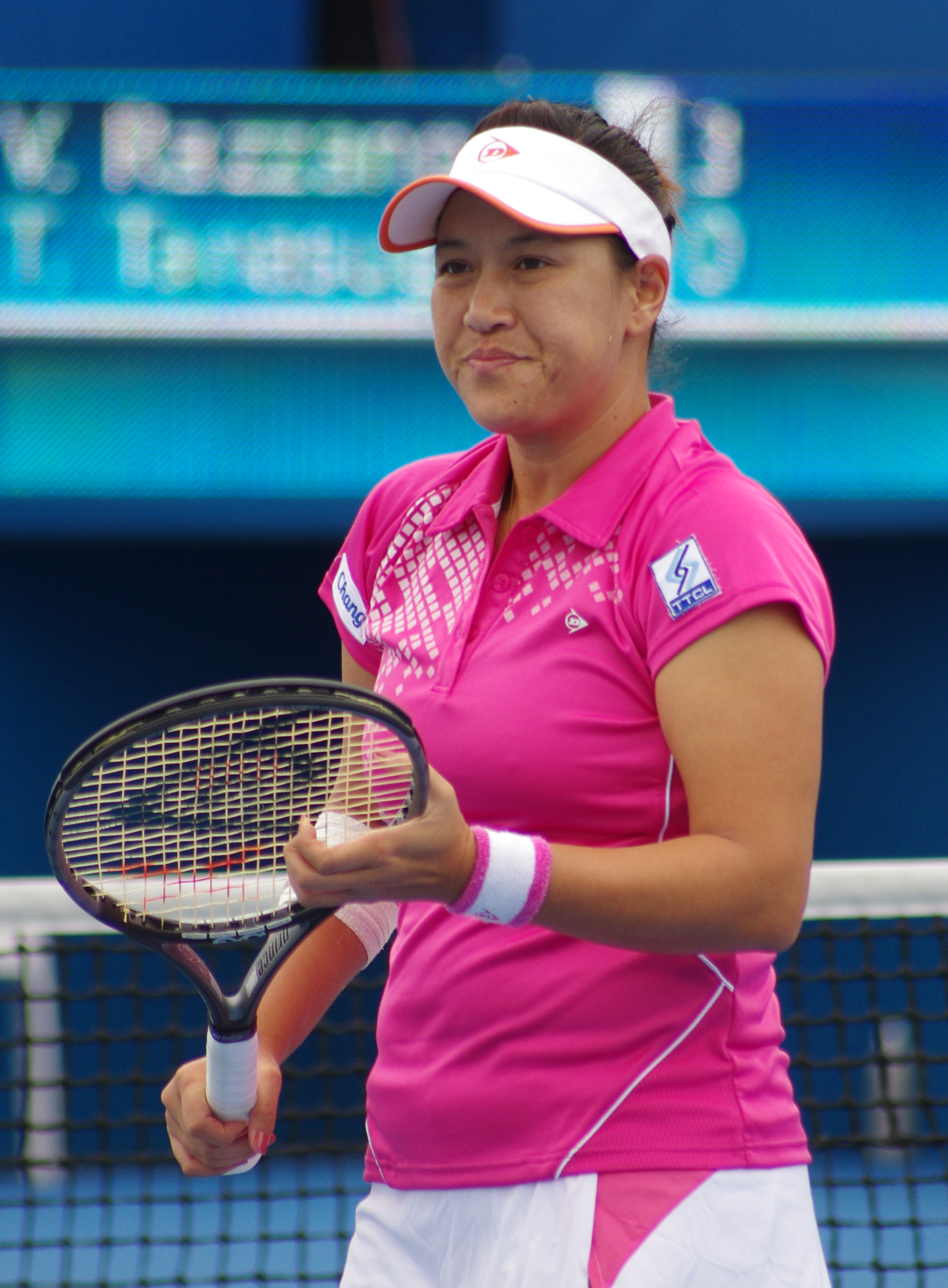
Tanasugarn in January 2012

Tanasugarn's career-high WTA ranking is No. 19, achieved on 13 May 2002, which is the highest ranking ever achieved by a Thai female player. She won four singles and eight doubles titles on the WTA Tour, and was briefly a doubles partner with Maria Sharapova, with whom she won two titles in 2003. Her career-high doubles ranking is 15, which she achieved on 13 September 2004. With Liezel Huber, she reached the 2004 US Open doubles quarterfinals, and at the 2011 Wimbledon Championships, she reached the women's doubles semifinal with Marina Erakovic. Her biggest individual success came in 2008, when she reached the singles quarterfinals at Wimbledon.

In her career, Tanasugarn has defeated former and current No. 1 players, including Amélie Mauresmo, Jennifer Capriati, Jelena Janković, Dinara Safina and Simona Halep. She has also beaten French Open champion Iva Majoli.

Tanasugarn has been regarded as a grass-court specialist; she won most matches on that surface including two WTA International titles. Tanasugarn at some point held the record of the most singles matches won on grass court among active players. As of 8 July 2013, she was second (with 84 wins) among active players, and 12th on the all-time list.

Tanasugarn has also been a regular competitor for the Thailand Fed Cup team, helping the team join the World Group II in 2005 and 2006, after beating the teams of Australia and Croatia in their play-off matches.

She received a law degree from Bangkok University in 2000.

She is also known to have played in the very first official match of the Arthur Ashe Stadium, at the 1997 US Open, in which she faced Chanda Rubin of the United States and won in two sets.

== Playing style ==
Tanasugarn produces her best game and strategy when she performs on grass. She is also known for her accurate flat ground strokes and a heavy slice serve for which are particularly effective on grass, Venus Williams has given an interview regarding Tanasugarn's game after their quarterfinal match in 2008 Wimbledon Championships: "I think her game is really suited for the grass. Her serve is a slice that turns into you and it stays low. Her shots are really, really low to the ground. A lot of time I think I was battling just to stay down on the shots, and I felt good when I got one up in my strike zone". Kim Clijsters has once described Tanasugarn as a "tricky player". Tanasugarn's weakness has always been her serve.

Tanasugarn was coached by her best friend, Andreea Ehritt-Vanc, until her retirement.

== Career ==
=== Juniors ===
During her junior career, her expenses were provided by her father, Virachai Tanasugarn, a lawyer who was once a Thai basketball player and who inspired Tanasugarn to become a professional tennis player. At 17, she reached the Junior Grand Slam final at Wimbledon in 1995 with a win over Anna Kournikova in the semifinal, but then lost to Poland's Aleksandra Olsza, in straight sets.

=== 1994–1999 ===
Tanasugarn turned pro in 1994, but made her WTA Tour debut in the 1993 Pattaya Open, in which she lost to Australian Rennae Stubbs. The following year, she made the second round in the same tournament by beating world No. 44, Marianne Werdel Witmeyer, in the first round. In 1995, Tanasugarn started participating in Grand Slams, but did not make it beyond the qualifying rounds. In 1996, Tanasugarn played her first WTA final at the Pattaya Open, in which she lost to Ruxandra Dragomir. In 1997, she reached the third round of the Australian Open, at Wimbledon and the US Open, beating Chanda Rubin in the first round. She reached a semifinal at Hobart and ended the year with a No. 46 ranking.

1998, Tanasugarn reached the fourth round of a major event at the Australian Open by defeating the reigning French Open champion and world No. 6, Iva Majoli, 6–0, 6–2 in the third round. Tanasugarn also made her second fourth round of the year at Wimbledon, where she eventually lost to Martina Hingis. In 1999, she reached the fourth round at Wimbledon for a second time by defeating Frenchwoman Sandrine Testud, in the third round. Tanasugarn ended the year ranked No. 72.

=== 2000–2004 ===
She partnered with Paradorn Srichaphan at the Hopman Cup in 2000. Tanasugarn beat Jelena Dokić of Australia, Barbara Schett of Austria, Ai Sugiyama of Japan, and Henrieta Nagyová of Slovakia. However, Tanasugarn lost in the women's singles final to Amanda Coetzer of South Africa, 6–3, 4–6, 4–6, having led 6–3, 3–0. In the men's singles final, Paradorn Srichaphan lost to Wayne Ferreira, 6–7, 3–6. This result made them the first Asian team to reach the finals at the Hopman Cup. Tanasugarn reached her second WTA final at Birmingham with a win over Julie Halard-Decugis, but lost to Lisa Raymond. She also lost in the fourth round at Wimbledon to Serena Williams. Tanasugarn reached three semifinals at the Japan Open, Kuala Lumpur, and Shanghai. She represented Thailand at the 2000 Summer Olympics, but was defeated by Venus Williams. Her year-end ranking was No. 29, her first time in the top 30.

In 2001, Tanasugarn had her second and third top-ten wins against Nathalie Tauziat at Eastbourne and Amélie Mauresmo at Wimbledon and reached her third career final at Japan Open, losing to Monica Seles, 3–6, 2–6. At the end of the season, Tanasugarn was ranked in the top 30.

In 2002, she achieved her best ranking by reaching the fourth and fifth major finals at Canberra, losing to Anna Smashnova, and at Doha, losing to Monica Seles, and the quarterfinals at the Pan Pacific Open. On 13 May, Tanasugarn was ranked No. 19 in the world, her best career ranking to date. She ended the year ranked No. 28.

In 2003, Tanasugarn won her first major in Hyderabad where she beat Maria Kirilenko in the quarterfinals, then Flavia Pennetta in the semifinals, and Iroda Tulyaganova in the final. Tanasugarn reached her second Tier I quarterfinal at the Pan Pacific Open, beating Silvia Farina Elia, but lost to Lindsay Davenport, in two sets. Tanasugarn suffered her earliest exit at Wimbledon since she turned pro, losing to Akiko Morigami in the first round. She reached the fourth round at the US Open for the first time, beating Rita Grande, Patty Schnyder, and ninth seed Daniela Hantuchová. Tanasugarn lost to Amélie Mauresmo in two sets in the following round. She was ranked No. 34 at the end of the year.

In 2004, she reached her sixth fourth round at Wimbledon, although she lost to Ai Sugiyama in two sets. Tanasugarn was also a semifinalist in the Japan Open Tennis Championships, losing to Maria Sharapova.

=== 2005–2007 ===
Tanasugarn had to deal with multiple injuries, which affected most of her year in 2005. Her ranking dropped out of the top 100, and she played in Challenger-level tournaments to collect points.

In 2006, she once mentioned retiring from tennis, but, after she qualified to play in the main draw of Wimbledon and reached the third round, she decided to give it another shot. Tanasugarn reached her home country tournament final again in the Bangkok Open, facing Vania King, and was two games away from taking the title. Leading in the final set 4–2, King fought back to win the match. Despite losing the match, Tanasugarn regained some confidence to get back to the tour. She finished that year ranked No. 75.

Unfortunately, Tanasugarn still struggled with injuries in 2007 and had to play in many Challengers, ending the season ranked No. 124.

=== 2008–2009 ===
She made a successful comeback in 2008. Tanasugarn decided to skip the clay-court season due to her difficulty playing on that surface and chose to play in hardcourt Challengers, she thought were more like grass. Tanasugarn won the singles title at the Kangaroo Cup in Gifu, defeating former world No. 4, Kimiko Date-Krumm.

In the grass-court season, Tanasugarn beat the Austrian Tamira Paszek in Birmingham, but lost to Bethanie Mattek in the fourth round. A week later, Tanasugarn stunned many tennis fans at the Ordina Open when, ranked No. 85, she beat Kateryna Bondarenko, Ashley Harkleroad, Michaëlla Krajicek, and Alona Bondarenko to reach her eighth major final, beating the French Open runner-up Dinara Safina in two sets. She reached her seventh fourth round at Wimbledon, beating Petra Cetkovská, Vera Zvonareva and Marina Erakovic en route, and surprised the world No. 3, Jelena Janković, with a two-set defeat in the fourth round. Despite making her Grand Slam quarterfinal debut, she lost to the eventual champion Venus Williams, in straight sets. Tanasugarn became the first Thai player to make a Grand Slam quarterfinal. She ended 2008 ranked No. 35, her best ranking in four years.

Shvedova and Tanasugarn in 2009 Pattaya Open doubles final match

Tanasugarn was seeded 32nd in the 2009 Australian, Open, but lost early to María José Martínez Sánchez. She played in the Fed Cup for Thailand, losing to Samantha Stosur, leaving Thailand in third place in the Asia/Oceania group, after Australia and New Zealand. Tanasugarn lost to Sania Mirza in straight sets in the quarterfinals of the Pattaya Women's Open. In doubles, she partnered Yaroslava Shvedova, and the team, seeded second, got into the final and won the match, beating Yuliya Beygelzimer and Vitalia Diatchenko.

At the French Open, Tanasugarn defeated Camille Pin, in the first round. In the second, she was easily beaten by eighth seed and defending champion, Ana Ivanovic.

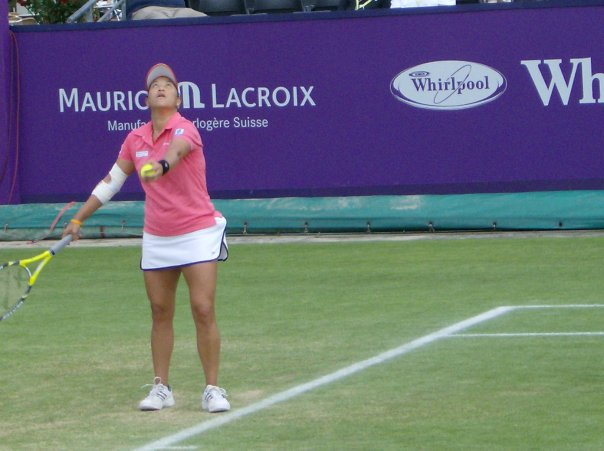
Tamarine Tanasugarn serving to Dinara Safina in their semifinal match at the Rosmalen Open

Tanasugarn started playing on grass courts at the Birmingham Classic. In the first round, she defeated Julie Coin in straight sets. In the second round, Tanasugarn spent 2 hours 23 minutes on court, eventually losing to home favourite Naomi Cavaday in three sets. In 's-Hertogenbosch, as defending champion, she defeated Barbora Záhlavová-Strýcová and seventh seeded Iveta Benešová to reach the quarterfinals. There, she recovered from a set down to defeat third seeded Flavia Pennetta. In the semifinals, Tanasugarn defeated Dinara Safina, in straight sets. It was her first career win over a reigning world No. 1. In the final, she beat Yanina Wickmayer to successfully defend her title.

At Wimbledon, Tanasugarn had an arm injury and lost to Arantxa Parra Santonja in the first round. She played the mixed-doubles event for the first time, partnering with Rogier Wassen, but she scratched in the second round because of her injury.

Tanasugarn came back after her arm injury at the US Open, but lost to Anastasija Sevastova in the first round.

=== 2010–2015 ===
Tanasugarn started the year by playing at the Australian Open. She won her first major first-round match in five years, with a 6–1, 7–6 victory over Sesil Karatantcheva, but lost to Kim Clijsters in the second round.

At the Pattaya Open, Tanasugarn worked her way past Alla Kudryavtseva, second seed Sabine Lisicki, Anna Chakvetadze, and Sesil Karatantcheva. She finally lost to top seed and defending champion, Vera Zvonareva, in a dramatic final.

Tanasugarn and her New Zealand partner Marina Erakovic won the Pattaya Open doubles title, beating Anna Chakvetadze and Ksenia Pervak, giving Tanasugarn a successful defence of her homeland doubles title. Her next scheduled tournament was the Malaysian Open, where she lost to seventh seed Magdaléna Rybáriková in the first round. At the American fortnight tours, she entered the main draw in Indian Wells as a lucky loser and advanced into the second round, before losing to 19th seed Aravane Rezaï. In Miami, she lost to Pauline Parmentier in the final qualifying round. She also played several ITF tournaments in April, reaching the finals in Johannesburg.

After the middle of April, Tanasugarn did not play any tournaments and withdrew in Strasbourg due to an elbow injury. At Roland-Garros, she lost to Daniela Hantuchová in the first round. Tanasugarn began playing her favourite surface, grass, at the Birmingham Classic, surviving into the second round against Sania Mirza, after Mirza failed to serve out the match at 5–4 and 30–0. She lost to Yanina Wickmayer in the next round, in straight sets. She then competed at Rosmalen, but was defeated in the first round. Tanasugarn also suffered a first-round loss at Wimbledon and missed the US Open due to injuries. She won her fourth WTA title at Osaka, defeating Marion Bartoli en route, and Kimiko Date-Krumm in the final.

Despite losing in qualifying stages of 2011 Wimbledon with her partner Marina Erakovic, the doubles team received a lucky loser berth into the main draw and advanced to the semifinals with a 4–6, 7–6, 13–11 victory over third seeds Lisa Raymond and Liezel Huber. It was the first time that Tanasugarn (as well as Erakovic) had advanced to the semifinals of a major event in any capacity.

In late March 2015, Tanasugarn defeated Sofia Shapatava in the first qualifying round of the Open GdF Suez; this would be the final singles win of her professional career. In late April, she lost to Kristýna Plíšková in the first round of the Kangaroo Cup; this would turn out to be the final singles match of her career.

=== 2016–2020: retirement & short comeback in doubles ===
She announced her retirement from professional tennis in June 2016.

Beginning in December 2018, Tanasugarn played doubles in small ITF tournaments around Thailand and nearby areas, winning the final of the $25k Hua Hin tournament in November 2019, partnering Lesley Pattinama Kerkhove. Since February 2020, she has been inactive again.

== Performance timelines ==
Key
W	F	SF	QF	#R	RR	Q#	P#	DNQ	A	Z#	PO	G	S	B	NMS	NTI	P	NH

(W) winner; (F) finalist; (SF) semifinalist; (QF) quarterfinalist; (#R) rounds 4, 3, 2, 1; (RR) round-robin stage; (Q#) qualification round; (P#) preliminary round; (DNQ) did not qualify; (A) absent; (Z#) Davis/Fed Cup Zonal Group (with number indication) or (PO) play-off; (G) gold, (S) silver or (B) bronze Olympic/Paralympic medal; (NMS) not a Masters tournament; (NTI) not a Tier I tournament; (P) postponed; (NH) not held; (SR) strike rate (events won / competed); (W–L) win–loss record.

Only main-draw results in WTA Tour, Grand Slam tournaments, Fed Cup and Olympic Games are included in win–loss records.

=== Singles ===
Tournament	1993	1994	1995	1996	1997	1998	1999	2000	2001	2002	2003	2004	2005	2006	2007	2008	2009	2010	2011	2012	2013	2014	2015	SR	W–L	Win%
Grand Slam tournaments
Australian Open	A	A	Q2	Q1	3R	4R	1R	3R	3R	3R	3R	1R	2R	1R	1R	1R	1R	2R	1R	1R	Q1	A	A	0 / 16	15–16	48%
French Open	A	A	Q1	A	2R	1R	1R	2R	1R	3R	1R	1R	1R	A	2R	1R	2R	1R	A	1R	A	A	A	0 / 14	6–14	30%
Wimbledon	A	A	Q1	A	3R	4R	4R	4R	4R	4R	1R	4R	2R	3R	1R	QF	1R	1R	2R	1R	Q2	A	A	0 / 16	28–16	64%
US Open	A	A	Q1	A	3R	1R	2R	3R	1R	2R	4R	1R	1R	Q1	1R	1R	1R	A	1R	Q2	A	A	A	0 / 13	9–13	41%
Win–loss	0–0	0–0	0–4	0–2	7–4	6–4	4–4	8–4	5–4	8–4	5–4	3–4	2–4	2–2	1–4	4–4	1–1	1–3	1–3	0–3	0–0	0–0	0–0	0 / 59	58–59	50%
Olympic Games
Summer Olympics	NH			A	NH			2R	NH			1R	NH			1R	NH			A	NH			0 / 3	1–3	25%
Premier Mandatory & 5 + former
Dubai / Qatar Open (Note: The first Premier 5 event of the year has switched back and forth between the Dubai Tennis Championships and the Qatar Open since 2009. Dubai was classified as a Premier 5 event from 2009 to 2011 before being succeeded by Doha for the 2012–2014 period. In 2015, Dubai regained its Premier 5 status while Doha was demoted to Premier status. The Premier 5 tournaments were reclassified as WTA 1000 tournaments in 2021.)	NH/NMS															3R	A	A	A	A	A	A	A	0 / 1	2–1	67%
Indian Wells Open	NMS			A	1R	2R	1R	1R	3R	3R	3R	1R	1R	Q1	2R	A	1R	2R	A	A	A	A	A	0 / 12	6–12	33%
Miami Open	A	A	3R	A	2R	3R	1R	2R	4R	3R	3R	2R	1R	A	1R	1R	2R	Q2	A	A	A	A	A	0 / 13	10–13	43%
German / Madrid Open (Note: In 2009, the German Open was replaced by the Madrid Open. The Premier Mandatory tournaments were reclassified as WTA 1000 tournaments in 2021.)	A	A	A	A	1R	2R	A	A	A	2R	A	A	A	A	A	A	1R	A	A	A	A	A	A	0 / 4	2–4	33%
Italian Open	A	A	A	A	1R	A	A	A	A	1R	A	A	A	A	Q2	A	A	A	A	A	A	A	A	0 / 2	0–2	0%
Canadian Open	A	A	A	A	2R	1R	A	1R	2R	2R	1R	2R	A	A	A	2R	A	A	A	Q1	A	A	A	0 / 8	5–8	38%
Cincinnati Open	NH/NMS																A	A	Q1	A	A	A	A	0 / 0	0–0	–
Pan Pacific / Wuhan Open (Note: In 2014, the Pan Pacific Open was downgraded to a Premier event and replaced by the Wuhan Open. The Premier 5 tournaments were reclassified as WTA 1000 tournaments in 2021.)	A	A	A	A	2R	1R	A	1R	A	QF	QF	1R	A	Q1	Q1	Q2	A	A	2R	A	A	A	A	0 / 7	6–7	46%
China Open	NH/NMS																A	A	A	A	A	A	A	0 / 0	0–0	–
Charleston Open (former)	A	A	A	A	1R	1R	A	A	A	A	1R	1R	A	A	1R	A	NMS							0 / 5	0–5	0%
Southern California Open (former)	NMS											1R	A	A	2R	A	NH/NMS							0 / 2	1–2	33%
Win–loss	0–0	0–0	1–1	0–0	3–7	3–6	0–2	1–4	4–3	6–6	4–5	2–6	0–2	0–0	2–4	3–3	1–3	1–1	1–1	0–0	0–0	0–0	0–0	0 / 54	32–54	37%
Career statistics
	1993	1994	1995	1996	1997	1998	1999	2000	2001	2002	2003	2004	2005	2006	2007	2008	2009	2010	2011	2012	2013	2014	2015	SR	W–L	Win%
Tournaments	1	1	5	5	20	21	13	19	21	26	24	25	16	7	18	17	13	10	10	7	0	0	1	Career total: 280		
Titles	0	0	0	0	0	0	0	0	0	0	1	0	0	0	0	1	1	1	0	0	0	0	0	Career total: 4		
Finals	0	0	0	1	0	0	0	1	1	2	1	0	0	1	0	1	1	2	0	0	0	0	0	Career total: 11		
Year-end ranking		249	209	79	46	37	72	29	29	28	34	66	132	75	124	35	111	58	122	154	240			$3,491,770		

=== Doubles ===
Tournament	1995	1996	1997	1998	1999	2000	2001	2002	2003	2004	2005	2006	2007	2008	2009	2010	2011	2012	2013	2014	2015	...	2020	SR	W–L	Win%
Grand Slam tournaments
Australian Open	A	A	1R	1R	1R	3R	A	A	1R	2R	A	2R	1R	2R	1R	1R	1R	1R	1R	1R	A		A	0 / 15	5–15	25%
French Open	A	A	1R	1R	1R	1R	A	2R	A	2R	1R	A	2R	1R	1R	1R	A	3R	2R	A	A		A	0 / 13	6–13	32%
Wimbledon	A	2R	1R	2R	1R	1R	A	2R	A	2R	1R	A	2R	2R	2R	1R	SF	3R	3R	Q1	A		A	0 / 15	15–15	50%
US Open	A	Q1	2R	2R	A	1R	A	A	A	QF	1R	A	2R	1R	A	A	1R	2R	A	A	A		A	0 / 9	7–9	44%
Win–loss	0–0	1–1	1–4	2–4	0–3	2–4	0–0	2–2	0–1	6–4	0–3	1–1	3–4	2–4	1–3	0–3	4–3	5–4	3–3	0–0	0–0		0–0	0 / 52	33–52	39%
National representation
Summer Olympics	NH	QF	NH			QF	NH			A	NH			A	NH			A	NH				NH	0 / 2	4–2	67%
Premier Mandatory & 5 + former
Dubai / Qatar Open	NH/NMS													1R	A	A	A	A	A	A	A		A	0 / 1	0–1	0%
Indian Wells Open	NMS	A	A	1R	Q2	2R	A	A	A	A	2R	A	A	A	1R	A	A	A	A	A	A		A	0 / 4	2–4	33%
Miami Open	A	A	A	2R	1R	2R	A	A	A	1R	2R	A	A	2R	A	A	A	A	2R	A	A		A	0 / 7	5–7	42%
German / Madrid Open	A	A	Q2	2R	A	A	A	1R	A	A	A	A	A	A	1R	A	A	A	A	A	A		A	0 / 3	0–3	0%
Italian Open	A	A	A	A	A	A	A	2R	A	A	A	A	A	A	A	A	A	A	A	A	A		A	0 / 1	1–1	50%
Canadian Open	A	A	1R	1R	A	1R	A	A	1R	F	A	A	A	QF	A	A	A	2R	A	A	A		A	0 / 7	4–7	36%
Cincinnati Open	NH/NMS														A	A	A	A	A	A	A		A	0 / 0	0–0	–
Pan Pacific / Wuhan Open	A	A	A	1R	A	A	A	A	A	QF	A	Q1	A	QF	A	A	1R	A	A	A	A		A	0 / 4	2–4	33%
China Open	NH/NMS														A	A	A	A	A	A	A		A	0 / 0	0–0	–
Charleston Open (former)	A	A	A	2R	A	A	A	A	A	QF	A	A	A	A	A	A	A	A	A	A	A		A	0 / 2	3–2	60%
Southern California Open (former)	NMS									2R	A	A	QF	A	A	A	A	A	A	A	A		A	0 / 2	2–2	50%
Zurich Open (former)	A	A	A	A	A	A	A	A	1R	A	A	A	A	A	A	A	A	A	A	A	A		A	0 / 1	0–1	0%
Win–loss	0–0	0–0	0–1	2–6	0–1	2–3	0–0	1–2	0–2	6–5	2–2	0–0	2–1	2–4	0–2	0–0	0–1	1–1	1–1	0–0	0–0		0–0	0 / 32	19–32	37%
Career statistics
Tournaments	4	8	15	19	11	13	5	8	10	16	15	6	11	16	10	7	6	12	7	2	2		1			

== Significant finals ==
=== Premier Mandatory & Premier 5 finals ===
==== Doubles: 1 (runner-up) ====
Result	Year	Tournament	Surface	Partner	Opponents	Score
Loss	2004	Canadian Open	Hard	(South Africa) Liezel Huber	(Japan) Ai Sugiyama (Japan) Shinobu Asagoe	0–6, 3–6

== WTA Tour finals ==
=== Singles: 11 (4 titles, 7 runner-ups) ===
Legend
Premier M & Premier 5
Premier
International (4–7)

Result	W–L	Date	Tournament	Tier	Surface	Opponent	Score
Loss	0–1	Nov 1996	Pattaya Open, Thailand	Tier IV (Note: Includes WTA Premier and WTA International tournaments. The WTA Tier II tournaments were reclassified as WTA Premier tournaments in 2009, while the WTA Tier III tournaments, WTA Tier IV tournaments and WTA Tier V tournaments were reclassified as WTA International tournaments the same year .)	Hard	(Romania) Ruxandra Dragomir	6–7^{(4–7)}, 4–6
Loss	0–2	Jun 2000	Birmingham Classic, UK	Tier III	Grass	(United States) Lisa Raymond	2–6, 7–6^{(9–7)}, 4–6
Loss	0–3	Oct 2001	Japan Open	Tier III	Hard	(United States) Monica Seles	3–6, 2–6
Loss	0–4	Jan 2002	Canberra International, Australia	Tier V	Hard	(Israel) Anna Smashnova	5–7, 6–7^{(2–7)}
Loss	0–5	Feb 2002	Qatar Open	Tier III	Hard	(United States) Monica Seles	6–7^{(6–8)}, 3–6
Win	1–5	Feb 2003	Hyderabad Open, India	Tier IV	Hard	(Uzbekistan) Iroda Tulyaganova	6–4, 6–4
Loss	1–6	Oct 2006	Bangkok Open, Thailand	Tier III	Hard	(United States) Vania King	6–2, 4–6, 4–6
Win	2–6	Jun 2008	Rosmalen Open, Netherlands	Tier III	Grass	(Russia) Dinara Safina	7–5, 6–3
Win	3–6	Jun 2009	Rosmalen Open, Netherlands (2)	International	Grass	(Belgium) Yanina Wickmayer	6–3, 7–5
Loss	3–7	Feb 2010	Pattaya Open, Thailand	International	Hard	(Russia) Vera Zvonareva	4–6, 4–6
Win	4–7	Oct 2010	Japan Women's Open	International	Hard	(Japan) Kimiko Date-Krumm	7–5, 6–7^{(4–7)}, 6–1

=== Doubles: 16 (8 titles, 8 runner-ups) ===
Legend
Premier M & Premier 5 (0–1)
Premier (0–2)
International (8–5)

Result	W–L	Date	Tournament	Tier	Surface	Partner	Opponents	Score
Win	1–0	Jan 1998	Auckland Open, New Zealand	Tier IV	Hard	(Japan) Nana Miyagi	(France) Julie Halard-Decugis (Slovakia) Janette Husárová	6–4, 7–5
Loss	1–1	Aug 1998	LA Championships, US	Tier II	Hard	(Ukraine) Elena Tatarkova	(Switzerland) Martina Hingis (Belarus) Natasha Zvereva	4–6, 2–6
Loss	1–2	Feb 2000	National Indoors, US	Tier III	Hard (i)	(Ukraine) Elena Tatarkova	(United States) Kimberly Po (United States) Corina Morariu	4–6, 6–4, 2–6
Win	2–2	Oct 2000	China Open	Tier IV	Hard	(United States) Lilia Osterloh	(Italy) Rita Grande (United States) Meghann Shaughnessy	7–5, 6–1
Win	3–2	Sep 2001	Bali Classic, Indonesia	Tier III	Hard	(Australia) Evie Dominikovic	(Chinese Taipei) Janet Lee (Indonesia) Wynne Prakusya	7–6^{(7–1)}, 6–4
Loss	3–3	Oct 2001	China Open	Tier IV	Hard	(Australia) Evie Dominikovic	(Czech Republic) Lenka Němečková (South Africa) Liezel Huber	0–6, 5–7
Loss	3–4	Sep 2003	China Open	Tier II	Hard	(Japan) Ai Sugiyama	(France) Émilie Loit (Australia) Nicole Pratt	3–6, 3–6
Win	4–4	Oct 2003	Japan Open	Tier III	Hard	(Russia) Maria Sharapova	(United States) Ansley Cargill (United States) Ashley Harkleroad	7–6^{(7–1)}, 6–0
Win	5–4	Oct 2003	Luxembourg Open	Tier III	Hard (i)	(Russia) Maria Sharapova	(Ukraine) Elena Tatarkova (Germany) Marlene Weingärtner	6–1, 6–4
Loss	5–5	Aug 2004	Canadian Open	Tier I (Note: were reclassified as Premier Mandatory & Premier 5 tournaments in 2009.)	Hard	(South Africa) Liezel Huber	(Japan) Ai Sugiyama (Japan) Shinobu Asagoe	0–6, 3–6
Loss	5–6	Nov 2008	Tournoi de Québec, Canada	Tier III	Hard (i)	(United States) Jill Craybas	(Germany) Anna-Lena Grönefeld (United States) Vania King	6–7^{(3–7)}, 4–6
Win	6–6	Feb 2009	Pattaya Open, Thailand	International	Hard	(Kazakhstan) Yaroslava Shvedova	(Ukraine) Yulia Beygelzimer (Russia) Vitalia Diatchenko	6–3, 6–2
Win	7–6	Feb 2010	Pattaya Open, Thailand (2)	International	Hard	(New Zealand) Marina Erakovic	(Russia) Anna Chakvetadze (Russia) Ksenia Pervak	7–5, 6–1
Win	8–6	Sep 2012	Guangzhou International, China	International	Hard	(China) Zhang Shuai	(Australia) Jarmila Gajdošová (Romania) Monica Niculescu	2–6, 6–2, [10–8]
Loss	8–7	Apr 2013	Monterrey Open, Mexico	International	Hard	(Czech Republic) Eva Birnerová	(Hungary) Tímea Babos (Japan) Kimiko Date	1–6, 4–6
Loss	8–8	Feb 2015	Pattaya Open, Thailand	International	Hard	(Japan) Shuko Aoyama	(Chinese Taipei) Chan Hao-ching (Chinese Taipei) Chan Yung-jan	6–2, 4–6, [3–10]

== ITF Circuit finals ==
Legend
$100,000 tournaments
$75,000 tournaments
$50,000 tournaments
$25,000 tournaments
$10/15,000 tournaments

=== Singles: 24 (15 titles, 9 runner-ups) ===
Result	W–L	Date	Tournament	Tier	Surface	Opponent	Score
Loss	0–1	Aug 1992	ITF Taipei, Taiwan	10,000	Hard	(South Korea) Park Sung-hee	3–6, 1–6
Win	1–1	Dec 1993	ITF Manila, Philippines	10,000	Hard	(South Korea) Choi Ju-yeon	6–2, 6–3
Win	2–1	Mar 1996	ITF Warrnambool, Australia	10,000	Grass	(Australia) Jane Taylor	6–4, 6–1
Loss	2–2	Mar 1996	ITF Canberra, Australia	10,000	Grass	(Australia) Kristine Kunce	4–6, 0–6
Win	3–2	Mar 1996	ITF Wodonga, Australia	10,000	Grass	(Australia) Kristine Kunce	4–6, 6–4, 7–6^{(5)}
Loss	3–3	Mar 1996	ITF New South Wales, Australia	10,000	Grass	(Australia) Kristine Kunce	2–6, 1–6
Loss	3–4	Aug 1996	ITF Jakarta, Indonesia	50,000	Hard	(San Marino) Ludmila Varmužová	2–6, 4–6
Win	4–4	Oct 1996	ITF Saga, Japan	25,000	Grass	(Japan) Kazue Takuma	6–4, 6–1
Win	5–4	Jun 1997	Surbiton Trophy, UK	25,000	Grass	(Poland) Aleksandra Olsza	5–7, 7–6, 5–0 ret.
Win	6–4	May 1999	Surbiton Trophy, UK (2)	25,000	Grass	(South Africa) Surina De Beer	6–4, 5–7, 6–2
Loss	6–5	Oct 1999	ITF Seoul, South Korea	50,000	Hard	(Uzbekistan) Iroda Tulyaganova	0–6, 2–6
Win	7–5	Oct 1999	ITF Saga, Japan	25,000	Grass	(Canada) Vanessa Webb	6–3, 6–3
Win	8–5	May 2000	Kangaroo Cup, Japan	50,000	Carpet	(Japan) Shinobu Asagoe	7–5, 6–4
Loss	8–6	Jun 2000	Surbiton Trophy, UK	25,000	Grass	(United Kingdom) Louise Latimer	5–7, 3–6
Win	9–6	Nov 2005	Shenzhen Open, China	50,000	Hard	(Japan) Miho Saeki	6–2, 6–4
Win	10–6	Nov 2006	ITF Shanghai, China	50,000	Hard	(Uzbekistan) Akgul Amanmuradova	6–3, 6–3
Loss	10–7	Nov 2007	ITF Xiamen, China	75,000	Hard	(Chinese Taipei) Latisha Chan	6–2, 2–6, 1–6
Win	11–7	May 2008	Kangaroo Cup, Japan (2)	50,000	Carpet	(Japan) Kimiko Date	4–6, 7–5, 6–2
Loss	11–8	May 2008	Fukuoka International, Japan	50,000	Grass	(Japan) Tomoko Yonemura	1–6, 6–2, 6–7^{(8)}
Loss	11–9	Apr 2010	Soweto Open, South Africa	100,000	Hard	(Russia) Nina Bratchikova	5–7, 6–7^{(7)}
Win	12–9	Sep 2010	ITF Noto, Japan	25,000	Carpet	(Thailand) Nudnida Luangnam	7–5, 6–2
Win	13–9	May 2011	Fukuoka International, Japan	50,000	Grass	(Chinese Taipei) Latisha Chan	6–4, 5–7, 7–5
Win	14–9	Nov 2011	Toyota World Challenge, Japan	75,000	Carpet (i)	(Japan) Kimiko Date	6–2, 7–5
Win	15–9	Sep 2014	ITF Noto, Japan	25,000	Carpet	(Chinese Taipei) Lee Ya-hsuan	6–0, 6–4

=== Doubles: 17 (8 titles, 9 runner-ups) ===
Result	W–L	Date	Tournament	Tier	Surface	Partner	Opponents	Score
Loss	0–1	Feb 1993	ITF Bandar Seri Begawan, Brunei	10,000	Hard	(United States) Sandy Sureephong	(Indonesia) Suzanna Wibowo (Indonesia) Romana Tedjakusuma	3–6, 1–6
Loss	0–2	Sep 1994	ITF Hat Yai, Thailand	10,000	Hard	(Thailand) Sasitorn Tangthienkul	(Thailand) Suvimol Duangchan (Thailand) Pimpisamai Kansuthi	3–6, 5–7
Win	1–2	Sep 1995	ITF Samut Prakan, Thailand	10,000	Hard	(Thailand) Benjamas Sangaram	(Indonesia) Agustine Limanto (Indonesia) Veronica Widyadharma	7–5, 1–6, 6–4
Win	2–2	Oct 1996	ITF Saga, Japan	25,000	Grass	(Australia) Danielle Jones	(Japan) Hiroko Mochizuki (Japan) Yuka Tanaka	6–2, 6–3
Loss	2–3	Oct 1999	ITF Seoul, South Korea	50,000	Hard	(South Korea) Park Sung-hee	(Australia) Catherine Barclay (South Korea) Kim Eun-ha	6–4, 4–6, 2–6
Win	3–3	May 2006	Beijing Challenger, China	50,000	Hard (i)	(Chinese Taipei) Chuang Chia-jung	(Russia) Nina Bratchikova (Latvia) Līga Dekmeijere	4–6, 6–2, 6–3
Loss	3–4	Jun 2006	Surbiton Trophy, UK	25,000	Grass	(Chinese Taipei) Hsieh Su-wei	(Australia) Casey Dellacqua (Australia) Trudi Musgrave	3–6, 3–6
Win	4–4	Nov 2009	Toyota World Challenge, Japan	75,000	Carpet (i)	(New Zealand) Marina Erakovic	(Japan) Akari Inoue (Japan) Akiko Yonemura	6–1, 6–4
Win	5–4	Apr 2010	Torneo Conchita Martínez, Spain	75,000	Hard	(Romania) Alexandra Dulgheru	(Indonesia) Yayuk Basuki (United States) Riza Zalameda	6–2, 6–0
Loss	5–5	Apr 2010	Soweto Open, South Africa	100,000	Hard	(New Zealand) Marina Erakovic	(Russia) Vitalia Diatchenko (Greece) Eirini Georgatou	3–6, 7–5, [14–16]
Win	6–5	Sep 2010	ITF Noto, Japan	25,000	Carpet	(Japan) Rika Fujiwara	(Japan) Shuko Aoyama (Japan) Akari Inoue	6–3, 6–3
Win	7–5	Oct 2010	Japan Women's Open	100,000	Hard	(United States) Jill Craybas	(Poland) Urszula Radwańska (Ukraine) Olga Savchuk	6–3, 6–1
Loss	7–6	May 2011	Kurume Cup, Japan	50,000	Grass	(Japan) Rika Fujiwara	(Japan) Ayumi Oka (Japan) Akiko Yonemura	3–6, 7–5, [8–10]
Loss	7–7	Jul 2014	ITF Bangkok, Thailand	10,000	Hard	(Thailand) Luksika Kumkhum	(Thailand) Varatchaya Wongteanchai (Thailand) Varunya Wongteanchai	3–6, 6–4, [8–10]
Loss	7–8	Oct 2019	ITF Hua Hin, Thailand	15,000	Hard	(China) Kang Jiaqi	(Thailand) Patcharin Cheapchandej (Thailand) Punnin Kovapitukted	3–6, 4–6
Loss	7–9	Nov 2019	ITF Hua Hin, Thailand	25,000	Hard	(Netherlands) Lesley Pattinama Kerkhove	(Romania) Georgia Craciun (Spain) Eva Guerrero Alvarez	2–6, 5–7
Win	8–9	Nov 2019	ITF Hua Hin, Thailand	25,000	Hard	(Netherlands) Lesley Pattinama Kerkhove	(Hong Kong) Ng Kwan-yau (China) Zheng Saisai	6–2, 7–6^{(5)}

== Top 10 wins ==
Season	1998	...	2001	...	2003	...	2008	2009	Total
Wins	1		2		1		2	1	7

#	Player	Rank	Event	Surface	Rd	Score	TTR
1998
1.	(Croatia) Iva Majoli	No. 6	Australian Open	Hard	3R	6–0, 6–2	No. 44
2001
2.	(France) Nathalie Tauziat	No. 10	Eastbourne International, UK	Grass	2R	6–7^{(1)}, 7–6^{(6)}, 6–3	No. 33
3.	(France) Amélie Mauresmo	No. 6	Wimbledon Championships, UK	Grass	3R	6–4, 6–4	No. 31
2003
4.	(Slovakia) Daniela Hantuchová	No. 9	US Open	Hard	3R	6–2, 6–4	No. 39
2008
5.	(Russia) Dinara Safina	No. 9	Rosmalen Open, Netherlands	Grass	F	7–5, 6–3	No. 85
6.	(Serbia) Jelena Janković	No. 3	Wimbledon Championships, UK	Grass	4R	6–3, 6–2	No. 60
2009
7.	(Russia) Dinara Safina	No. 1	Rosmalen Open, Netherlands	Grass	SF	7–5, 7–5	No. 47
