= 2014 Open GDF Suez =

- Date: 25 January – 2 February
- Edition: 22nd
- Category: WTA Premier
- Draw: 28S / 16D
- Prize money: $710,000
- Surface: Hard / Indoor
- Location: Paris, France

Champions

Singles
- (Russia) Anastasia Pavlyuchenkova

Doubles
- (Germany) Anna-Lena Grönefeld / (Czech Republic) Květa Peschke
- Open GDF Suez

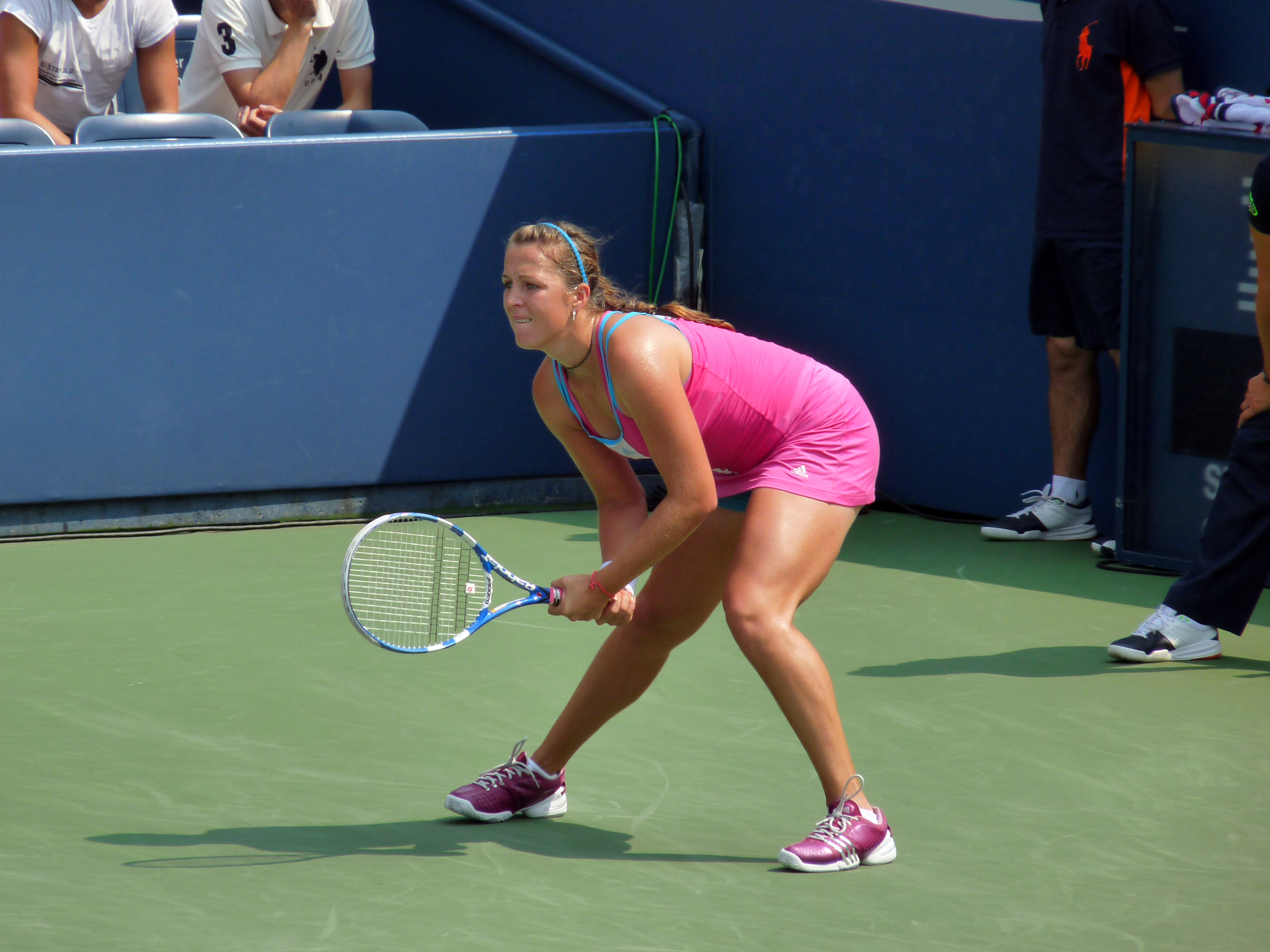
Anastasia Pavlyuchenkova 2011

The 2014 Open GDF Suez was a women's professional tennis tournament played on indoor hardcourts. It was the 22nd and last edition of the Open GDF Suez (formerly known as the Open Gaz de France) and a Premier tournament on the 2014 WTA Tour. It took place at Stade Pierre de Coubertin in Paris, France from January 25 through February 2, 2014. Unseeded Anastasia Pavlyuchenkova won the singles title.

== Finals ==
=== Singles ===
- (Russia) Anastasia Pavlyuchenkova defeated (Italy) Sara Errani, 3–6, 6–2, 6–3

=== Doubles ===
- (Germany) Anna-Lena Grönefeld / (Czech Republic) Květa Peschke defeated (Hungary) Tímea Babos / (France) Kristina Mladenovic, 6–7^{(7–9)}, 6–4, [10–5]

== Points and prize money ==
=== Point distribution ===
Event	W	F	SF	QF	Round of 16	Round of 32	Q	Q3	Q2	Q1
Singles	470	305	185	100	55	1	25	18	13	1
Doubles	470	305	185	100	1	—N/a	—N/a	—N/a	—N/a	—N/a

=== Prize money ===
Event	W	F	SF	QF	Round of 16	Round of 32^{1}	Q3	Q2	Q1
Singles	$96,774	$51,613	$27,703	$14,887	$7,984	$5,073	$2,298	$1,210	$685
Doubles *	$30,645	$16,129	$8,871	$4,516	$2,448	—N/a	—N/a	—N/a	—N/a

_{^{1} Qualifiers prize money is also the Round of 32 prize money}
_{* per team}

== Singles main-draw entrants ==
=== Seeds ===
Country	Player	Ranking^{1}	Seeding
RUS	Maria Sharapova	3	1
~~CZE~~	~~Petra Kvitová~~	~~6~~	~~2~~
ITA	Sara Errani	7	3
GER	Angelique Kerber	9	4
ROU	Simona Halep	11	5
ITA	Roberta Vinci	12	6
ESP	Carla Suárez Navarro	16	7
BEL	Kirsten Flipkens	19	8

- ^{1} Rankings as of January 13, 2014

=== Other entrants ===
The following players received wildcards into the main draw:

- (France) Caroline Garcia
- (Czech Republic) Petra Kvitová
- (France) Kristina Mladenovic

The following players received entry from the qualifying draw:

- (Spain) Lara Arruabarrena
- (Germany) Anna-Lena Friedsam
- (Sweden) Johanna Larsson
- (Kazakhstan) Galina Voskoboeva

The following players received entry as lucky loser:

- (Czech Republic) Barbora Záhlavová-Strýcová

=== Withdrawals ===
Before the tournament

- (Slovakia) Dominika Cibulková (fatigue) → replaced by (Switzerland) Stefanie Vögele
- (Serbia) Ana Ivanovic (left hip injury) → replaced by (Germany) Andrea Petkovic
- (Estonia) Kaia Kanepi (low back injury) → replaced by (New Zealand) Marina Erakovic
- (Czech Republic) Petra Kvitová (respiratory illness) → replaced by (Czech Republic) Barbora Záhlavová-Strýcová
- (Czech Republic) Lucie Šafářová (right shoulder injury) → replaced by (Ukraine) Elina Svitolina

=== Retirements ===
- (New Zealand) Marina Erakovic (back injury)

== Doubles main-draw entrants ==
=== Seeds ===
Country	Player	Country	Player	Rank^{1}	Seed
ITA	Sara Errani	ITA	Roberta Vinci	2	1
RUS	Anastasia Pavlyuchenkova	RUS	Nadia Petrova	29	2
GER	Anna-Lena Grönefeld	CZE	Květa Peschke	31	3
HUN	Tímea Babos	FRA	Kristina Mladenovic	57	4

- ^{1} Rankings are as of January 13, 2014

=== Other entrants ===
The following pairs received wildcards into the doubles main draw:

- (France) Alizé Cornet / (France) Caroline Garcia
- (Slovakia) Daniela Hantuchová / (Czech Republic) Petra Kvitová

=== Withdrawals ===
During the tournament

- (Italy) Sara Errani (cramping)
