= 2014 Open GDF Suez – Doubles =

Doubles
- 2014 Open GDF Suez

Final
- Champions: (Germany) Anna-Lena Grönefeld (Czech Republic) Květa Peschke
- Runners-up: (Hungary) Tímea Babos (France) Kristina Mladenovic
- Score: 6–7^{(7–9)}, 6–4, [10–5]

Events
| Singles | Doubles |
| ← 2013 · | Open GDF Suez |

Sara Errani and Roberta Vinci were the defending champions, but withdrew from the semifinals against Tímea Babos and Kristina Mladenovic.
Anna-Lena Grönefeld and Květa Peschke won the title, defeating Babos and Mladenovic in the final, 6–7^{(7–9)}, 6–4, [10–5].

== Seeds ==
1. (Italy) Sara Errani / (Italy) Roberta Vinci (semifinals, withdrew)
2. (Russia) Anastasia Pavlyuchenkova / (Russia) Nadia Petrova (first round)
3. (Germany) Anna-Lena Grönefeld / (Czech Republic) Květa Peschke (champions)
4. (Hungary) Tímea Babos / (France) Kristina Mladenovic (final)

== Draw ==
=== Key ===
- Q = Qualifier
- WC = Wild card
- LL = Lucky loser
- Alt = Alternate
- SE = Special exempt
- PR = Protected ranking
- ITF = ITF entry
- JE = Junior exempt
- w/o = Walkover
- r = Retired
- d = Defaulted
- SR = Special ranking

=== Draw ===
First round
1 | (Italy) S Errani (Italy) R Vinci | 6 | 6
(Czech Republic) E Hrdinová (Austria) S Klemenschits | 0 | 2
WC | (France) A Cornet (France) C Garcia | 6 | 6
WC | (Slovakia) D Hantuchová (Czech Republic) P Kvitová | 3 | 2
4 | (Hungary) T Babos (France) K Mladenovic | 5 | 6 | [10]
(Germany) M Barthel (United States) M Moulton-Levy | 7 | 3 | [5]
(Czech Republic) R Voráčová (Czech Republic) B Záhlavová-Strýcová | 6 | 2 | [8]
(Slovakia) J Husárová (Poland) A Rosolska | 0 | 6 | [10]
(New Zealand) M Erakovic (Croatia) P Martić | 5 | 4
(Poland) K Jans-Ignacik (Romania) R Olaru | 7 | 6
(Czech Republic) L Hradecká (Netherlands) M Krajicek | 6 | 1 | [9]
3 | (Germany) A-L Grönefeld (Czech Republic) K Peschke | 4 | 6 | [11]
(Russia) V Dushevina (Spain) A Parra Santonja | 3 | 6 | [10]
(Canada) G Dabrowski (Georgia (country)) O Kalashnikova | 6 | 3 | [5]
(Romania) M Niculescu (Czech Republic) K Zakopalová | 6 | 6
2 | (Russia) A Pavlyuchenkova (Russia) N Petrova | 3 | 3

Quarterfinals
1 | (Italy) S Errani (Italy) R Vinci | 3 | 6 | [10]
WC | (France) A Cornet (France) C Garcia | 6 | 4 | [5]
4 | (Hungary) T Babos (France) K Mladenovic | 6 | 6
(Slovakia) J Husárová (Poland) A Rosolska | 3 | 2
(Poland) K Jans-Ignacik (Romania) R Olaru | 4 | 1
3 | (Germany) A-L Grönefeld (Czech Republic) K Peschke | 6 | 6
(Russia) V Dushevina (Spain) A Parra Santonja | 2 | 6 | [4]
(Romania) M Niculescu (Czech Republic) K Zakopalová | 6 | 4 | [10]

Semifinals
1 | (Italy) S Errani (Italy) R Vinci
4 | (Hungary) T Babos (France) K Mladenovic | w/o
3 | (Germany) A-L Grönefeld (Czech Republic) K Peschke | 6 | 2 | [10]
(Romania) M Niculescu (Czech Republic) K Zakopalová | 2 | 6 | [4]

Final
4 | (Hungary) T Babos (France) K Mladenovic | 7^{9} | 4 | [5]
3 | (Germany) A-L Grönefeld (Czech Republic) K Peschke | 6^{7} | 6 | [10]
