= 2014 Open GDF Suez – Singles =

Singles
- 2014 Open GDF Suez

Final
- Champion: (Russia) Anastasia Pavlyuchenkova
- Runner-up: (Italy) Sara Errani
- Score: 3–6, 6–2, 6–3

Details
- Draw: 28
- Seeds: 8

Events
Singles	Doubles
← 2013 ·	Open GDF Suez

Mona Barthel was the defending champion, but lost in the first round to Kirsten Flipkens.

Anastasia Pavlyuchenkova won the title, defeating Sara Errani in the final, 3–6, 6–2, 6–3.

== Seeds ==
The top four seeds receive a bye into the second round.

1. (Russia) Maria Sharapova (semifinals)
2. (Czech Republic) Petra Kvitová (withdrew because of respiratory illness)
3. (Italy) Sara Errani (final)
4. (Germany) Angelique Kerber (quarterfinals)

5. (Romania) Simona Halep (first round)
6. (Italy) Roberta Vinci (first round)
7. (Spain) Carla Suárez Navarro (second round)
8. (Belgium) Kirsten Flipkens (quarterfinals)

== Draw ==
=== Key ===
- Q = Qualifier
- WC = Wild card
- LL = Lucky loser
- Alt = Alternate
- SE = Special exempt
- PR = Protected ranking
- ITF = ITF entry
- JE = Junior exempt
- w/o = Walkover
- r = Retired
- d = Defaulted
- SR = Special ranking

=== Finals ===
Semifinals
1	(Russia) Maria Sharapova	6	3	4
(Russia) Anastasia Pavlyuchenkova	4	6	6
3	(Italy) Sara Errani	7^{7}	3	7^{7}
(France) Alizé Cornet	6^{3}	6	6^{5}

Final
(Russia) Anastasia Pavlyuchenkova	3	6	6
3	(Italy) Sara Errani	6	2	3

=== Top half ===
First round
(New Zealand) M Erakovic	3	0^{r}
(Slovakia) D Hantuchová	6	3
(Austria) Y Meusburger	7	6
Q	(Germany) A-L Friedsam	5	1
(Germany) M Barthel	3	6	2
8	(Belgium) K Flipkens	6	4	6
(Czech Republic) K Zakopalová	7^{7}	6
WC	(France) C Garcia	6^{4}	2
(Russia) A Pavlyuchenkova	1	6	6
(Italy) F Schiavone	6	4	1
Q	(Sweden) J Larsson	1	4
7	(Spain) C Suárez Navarro	6	6

Second round
1	(Russia) M Sharapova	6	6
(Slovakia) D Hantuchová	0	1
(Austria) Y Meusburger	1	3
8	(Belgium) K Flipkens	6	6
4	(Germany) A Kerber	6	7
(Czech Republic) K Zakopalová	2	5
(Russia) A Pavlyuchenkova	6	3	6
7	(Spain) C Suárez Navarro	2	6	3

Quarterfinals
1	(Russia) M Sharapova	6	6
8	(Belgium) K Flipkens	2	2
4	(Germany) A Kerber	7	3	6^{3}
(Russia) A Pavlyuchenkova	5	6	7^{7}

Semifinals
1	(Russia) M Sharapova	6	3	4
(Russia) A Pavlyuchenkova	4	6	6

=== Bottom half ===
First round
6	(Italy) R Vinci	3	6	5
(Ukraine) E Svitolina	6	0	7
(Switzerland) S Vögele	7	5	6^{3}
Q	(Kazakhstan) G Voskoboeva	5	7	7^{7}
(Italy) K Knapp	6	6
Q	(Spain) L Arruabarrena	4	1
5	(Romania) S Halep	6^{1}	4
WC	(France) K Mladenovic	7^{7}	6
(Germany) A Petkovic	6	6
(Serbia) B Jovanovski	2	3
(Slovakia) M Rybáriková	3	7	2
(France) A Cornet	6	5	6

Second round
(Ukraine) E Svitolina	6	6
Q	(Kazakhstan) G Voskoboeva	1	2
(Italy) K Knapp	4	3
3	(Italy) S Errani	6	6
WC	(France) K Mladenovic	4	2
(Germany) A Petkovic	6	6
(France) A Cornet	6	6^{2}	6
LL	(Czech Republic) B Záhlavová-Strýcová	3	7^{7}	3

Quarterfinals
(Ukraine) E Svitolina	2	3
3	(Italy) S Errani	6	6
(Germany) A Petkovic	6^{6}	7	3
(France) A Cornet	7^{8}	5	6

Semifinals
3	(Italy) S Errani	7^{7}	3	7^{7}
(France) A Cornet	6^{3}	6	6^{5}

== Qualifying ==
=== Seeds ===
1. (Germany) Annika Beck (first round)
2. (Romania) Monica Niculescu (first round)
3. (Spain) María Teresa Torró Flor (first round)
4. (Spain) Lourdes Domínguez Lino (second round)
5. (Israel) Shahar Pe'er (first round)
6. (Kazakhstan) Galina Voskoboeva (qualified)
7. (Czech Republic) Barbora Záhlavová-Strýcová (qualifying competition)
8. (Hungary) Tímea Babos (first round)

=== Qualifiers ===
1. (Spain) Lara Arruabarrena
2. (Kazakhstan) Galina Voskoboeva
3. (Sweden) Johanna Larsson
4. (Germany) Anna-Lena Friedsam

=== Lucky losers ===
1. (Czech Republic) Barbora Záhlavová-Strýcová

=== Qualifying draw ===
==== First qualifier ====
First round
1	(Germany) Annika Beck	1	4
(Croatia) Petra Martić	6	6
WC	(France) Alizé Lim	6^{6}	4
(Spain) Lara Arruabarrena	7^{8}	6
(Netherlands) Kiki Bertens	3	4
WC	(France) Pauline Parmentier	6	6
(Czech Republic) Lucie Hradecká	1	2
7	(Czech Republic) Barbora Záhlavová-Strýcová	6	6

Second round
(Croatia) Petra Martić	3	4
(Spain) Lara Arruabarrena	6	6
WC	(France) Pauline Parmentier	6^{3}	4
7	(Czech Republic) Barbora Záhlavová-Strýcová	7^{7}	6

Qualifying competition
(Spain) Lara Arruabarrena	6	7
7	(Czech Republic) Barbora Záhlavová-Strýcová	1	5

==== Second qualifier ====
First round
2	(Romania) Monica Niculescu	3	1
(France) Virginie Razzano	6	6
(United Kingdom) Johanna Konta	6^{2}	6	4
(Czech Republic) Kristýna Plíšková	7^{7}	4	6
(France) Mathilde Johansson	6	7^{7}
WC	(France) Amandine Hesse	2	6^{5}
(Ukraine) Lesia Tsurenko	3	1
6	(Kazakhstan) Galina Voskoboeva	6	6

Second round
(France) Virginie Razzano	4	4
(Czech Republic) Kristýna Plíšková	6	6
(France) Mathilde Johansson	5	4
6	(Kazakhstan) Galina Voskoboeva	7	6

Qualifying competition
(Czech Republic) Kristýna Plíšková	7	4	6^{2}
6	(Kazakhstan) Galina Voskoboeva	5	6	7^{7}

==== Third qualifier ====
First round
3	(Spain) María Teresa Torró Flor	2	6^{2}
(Russia) Nadia Petrova	6	7^{7}
WC	(France) Estelle Cascino	1	2
(Germany) Dinah Pfizenmaier	6	6
(Serbia) Vesna Dolonc	1	6	6
(Russia) Vera Dushevina	6	0	4
(Sweden) Johanna Larsson	6	7
5	(Israel) Shahar Pe'er	2	5

Second round
(Russia) Nadia Petrova	4	5
(Germany) Dinah Pfizenmaier	6	7
(Serbia) Vesna Dolonc	4	3
(Sweden) Johanna Larsson	6	6

Qualifying competition
(Germany) Dinah Pfizenmaier	5	3
(Sweden) Johanna Larsson	7	6

==== Fourth qualifier ====
First round
4	(Spain) Lourdes Domínguez Lino	6	7
(France) Claire Feuerstein	3	5
(Czech Republic) Petra Cetkovská	3	7^{7}	6
(Belgium) Alison Van Uytvanck	6	6^{3}	3
(Germany) Anna-Lena Friedsam	3	7^{9}	7^{7}
(Sweden) Sofia Arvidsson	6	6^{7}	6^{5}
(Ukraine) Maryna Zanevska	5	6	6
8	(Hungary) Tímea Babos	7	4	4

Second round
4	(Spain) Lourdes Domínguez Lino	5	7	1
(Czech Republic) Petra Cetkovská	7	5	6
(Germany) Anna-Lena Friedsam	6	7^{7}
(Ukraine) Maryna Zanevska	3	6^{5}

Qualifying competition
(Czech Republic) Petra Cetkovská	2	2
(Germany) Anna-Lena Friedsam	6	6
