= Daniela Hantuchová =

Slovak tennis player (born 1983)

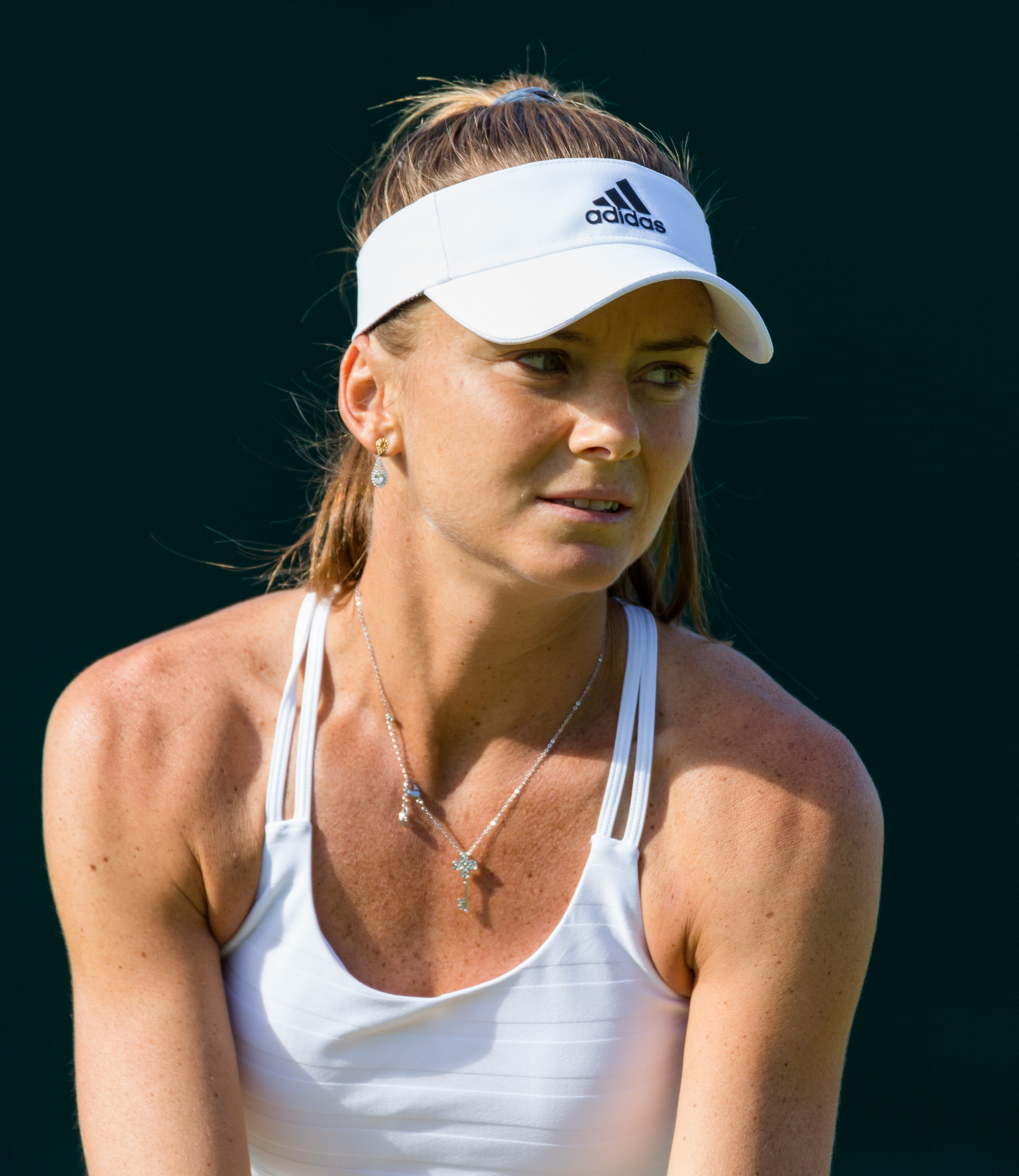
- Hantuchová at the 2015 Wimbledon Championships
- Country (sports): Slovakia
- Residence: Monte Carlo, Monaco
- Born: 23 April 1983 (age 43) Poprad, Czechoslovakia
- Height: 1.81 m (5 ft 11 in)
- Turned pro: 1999
- Retired: 6 July 2017
- Plays: Right-handed (two-handed backhand)
- Prize money: $10,436,407: 45th in all-time rankings

Singles
- Career record: 570–415
- Career titles: 7
- Highest ranking: No. 5 (27 January 2003)

Grand Slam singles results
- Australian Open: SF (2008)
- French Open: 4R (2002, 2006, 2010, 2011)
- Wimbledon: QF (2002)
- US Open: QF (2002, 2013)

Other tournaments
- Tour Finals: RR (2002, 2007)
- Olympic Games: 3R (2012)

Doubles
- Career record: 288–234
- Career titles: 9
- Highest ranking: No. 5 (26 August 2002)

Grand Slam doubles results
- Australian Open: F (2002, 2009)
- French Open: F (2006)
- Wimbledon: QF (2005)
- US Open: SF (2011)

Mixed doubles
- Career record: 40–14
- Career titles: 4

Grand Slam mixed doubles results
- Australian Open: W (2002)
- French Open: W (2005)
- Wimbledon: W (2001)
- US Open: W (2005)

Team competitions
- Fed Cup: W (2002); Record 36–19
- Hopman Cup: W (2005)

Daniela Hantuchová (Slovak pronunciation: [ˈdaɲɪela ˈɦantuxɔʋaː]; born 23 April 1983) is a Slovak tennis commentator and retired player. She turned professional in 1999 and had her breakthrough year in 2002, when she won her first WTA Tour title at the Indian Wells Open, defeating Martina Hingis in the final and becoming the lowest-ranked player to ever win the tournament. She also reached the quarterfinals of that year's Wimbledon Championships and US Open, ending the year in the top ten. She was part of the Slovak team that won the 2002 Fed Cup and the 2005 Hopman Cup.

Hantuchová reached her highest ranking of world No. 5 in January 2003, after playing the quarterfinals of the Australian Open. She has won seven WTA Tour tournaments, including the Indian Wells Open for a second time in 2007, with the 2015 Thailand Open being her last victory. She reached the semifinals of the 2008 Australian Open, her best result in a major tournament. Her biggest career wins include victories over defending champion Serena Williams in the third round of the 2006 Australian Open and world No. 1 Caroline Wozniacki in the third round of the 2011 French Open. Hantuchová became the 37th woman in the Open Era to reach 500 career wins when she beat Laura Robson in the second round of the 2013 Birmingham Classic on her way to the title.

She is also an accomplished doubles player, achieving a career-high doubles ranking of world No. 5. In 2005, she completed the career Grand Slam in mixed doubles, becoming only the fifth female tennis player to do so. She won the mixed doubles at Wimbledon in 2001 with Leoš Friedl, at the Australian Open in 2002 with Kevin Ullyett, at the French Open in 2005 with Fabrice Santoro and at the US Open in 2005 with Mahesh Bhupathi. She has also reached the finals of the mixed doubles at Wimbledon in 2002 with Ullyett and the finals of the women's doubles at the Australian Open in 2002 with Arantxa Sánchez Vicario, at the French Open in 2006 with Ai Sugiyama and at the Australian Open in 2009 with Sugiyama.

Hantuchová announced her retirement from professional tennis on 6 July 2017. Since then, she has been a tennis commentator and pundit, covering tournaments such as the US Open and Wimbledon for Amazon Prime, as well as serving as a commentator for Fox Sports. Hantuchová has also produced a web series for Tennis Channel and is hosting a podcast about sports and entertainment.

== Personal life ==
Hantuchová was born in Poprad, Czechoslovakia (now Slovakia) to father Igor, a computer scientist, and mother Marianna, a toxicologist. She was introduced to tennis by her grandmother Helena, a former Slovak national champion.

When her parents split up in 2003, Hantuchová's performances temporarily worsened. At Wimbledon that year, she failed to convert several match points and was seen weeping on court. She also suffered from a weight problem during this period. She was suspected of being anorexic, but denied this, saying that her weight loss was due to over-training and that it had not affected her stamina.

Hantuchová speaks fluent Slovak, Czech, English and German, as well as some Croatian and Italian. She was trained as a classical pianist. She is thought to be a perfectionist and puts a lot of pressure on herself during her training. Hantuchová qualified for university in Slovakia but deferred it to pursue tennis.

She appeared in the 2009 Sports Illustrated Swimsuit Edition alongside Maria Kirilenko and Tatiana Golovin in a pictorial entitled Volley of the Dolls. In July 2012, she appeared nude in the 2012 edition of ESPN: The Magazine's "The Body Issue". She appeared on one of six special edition covers. Though widely considered to be a "sex symbol", Hantuchová has never considered herself as such, saying that modelling is "just fun to do from time to time".

In 2017, she appeared in the Slovak dancing show Let's Dance. Her dancing partner was Erik Ňarjaš. She was eliminated in the third round.

== Career ==
=== 1999: Turning pro ===
Hantuchová turned professional in this year and took part in several ITF tournaments. She won a $25k tournament in Jackson in May, beating Milagros Sequera in the final; she won a $25k doubles tournament in Civitanova Marche in July, where she teamed up with Eva Dyrberg to beat Rosa María Andrés Rodríguez and Conchita Martínez Granados in the final; and won a $25k tournament in Fano in September, beating Flora Perfetti in the final. She also entered her first WTA tournament in October, that year's Eurotel Slovak Open, losing in the singles to Sabine Appelmans in the first round. She also entered the doubles with Ľudmila Cervanová. They beat Květa Peschke and Barbara Rittner in the round of 16 and lost to Nathalie Dechy and Henrieta Nagyová in the quarterfinals.

=== 2000: First WTA Tour quarterfinal ===
Hantuchová's first WTA tournament of 2000 was the Australian Open, where she was knocked out in the second qualifying round. Her next event was the U.S. Indoor Championships in Oklahoma City. She progressed through three qualifying rounds and beat Shinobu Asagoe in the first round before losing to Sarah Pitkowski-Malcor in the second round. Hantuchová's next three tournaments were the Miami Open, where she received a wildcard and lost in the first round to Elena Dementieva; the Amelia Island Championships, where she lost in the first qualifying round to Pavlina Nola, and the Belgian Open, where she lost in the first round to Kim Clijsters.

At Strasbourg in May, Hantuchová reached her first ever WTA quarterfinal. She won three qualifying matches before beating Iroda Tulyaganova and Nadia Petrova in the first and second rounds, respectively. She lost the quarterfinal to Rita Kuti-Kis. She did not enter the qualifiers for that year's French Open. In her next four tournaments, the Birmingham Classic, Wimbledon, the Austrian Open and the US Open, she did not advance beyond the qualifying rounds. Between the Austrian Open and the US Open, Hantuchová won her final ITF tournament, at a $50k tournament held in the Bronx, she beat Yi Jingqian in the final in straight sets.

Hantuchová reached her second quarterfinal of the year at the Luxembourg Open when she beat Virginie Razzano in the first round and Nathalie Tauziat in the second round. She lost in the quarterfinals to Barbara Rittner. At the Slovak Indoors, she lost in the first round of the singles to Anne Kremer. However, she and partner Karina Habšudová won the doubles tournament. They were due to face Petra Mandula and Patricia Wartusch in the final, but they withdrew and Hantuchová and Habšudová won in a walkover. It was Hantuchová's first WTA Tour title. Her final tournament of the year was the Philadelphia Championships. In the first round, she beat Alexandra Stevenson, who retired injured after the end of the first set. In the second round, she lost to Nathalie Tauziat.

=== 2001: First tour semifinal ===
Hantuchová began 2001 at the Sydney International, where she lost in the first qualifying round. She automatically qualified for the Australian Open but lost to Anna Kournikova in the first round. Hantuchová then reached her first ever tour semifinal at the U.S. Indoor Championships. She beat Tara Snyder, third seed Amanda Coetzer and Anikó Kapros, before losing to Jennifer Capriati in the semifinals. Hantuchová then progressed through two qualifying rounds at the Indian Wells Open but lost to Rita Kuti-Kis in the first round of the main draw. She received a wildcard for the Miami Open, but lost in the first round.

Hantuchová played three Fed Cup matches for Slovakia in April, and then in the German Open in May, where she lost in the second qualifying round to Francesca Schiavone. At the Italian Open, Hantuchová lost in the singles to eventual finalist Amélie Mauresmo in the third round. She also competed in the doubles with Nagyová. They beat Kerry-Anne Guse and Alicia Molik in the first round, Martina Navratilova and Arantxa Sánchez Vicario in the second round, Mary Pierce and Ai Sugiyama in the quarterfinal and lost to Paola Suárez and Patricia Tarabini in the semifinal. Hantuchová's form saw her qualify automatically for the French Open, beating Alexandra Stevenson in the first round and losing to eighth seed Conchita Martínez in the second round. She again teamed up with Nagyová in the doubles, reaching the third round.

Hantuchová reached her second semifinal of the year at the Birmingham Classic in June. She beat Nathalie Dechy, Eleni Daniilidou, Nicole Pratt, and Virginie Razzano, before falling to Miriam Oremans in the semifinals. At the Eastbourne International a week later, Hantuchová entered the doubles with the previous year's champion Ai Sugiyama. They reached the semifinals, where they lost to second seeds Cara Black and Elena Likhovtseva. At Wimbledon the week after, she beat Oremans in a rematch in the first round and lost to Venus Williams in the second round. She also entered the doubles, losing in the third round with Karina Habšudová; and the mixed doubles with Leoš Friedl. Unseeded, they beat Devin Bowen and María José Martínez Sánchez in the first round, top seeds Rennae Stubbs and Todd Woodbridge in the second, 13th seeds Jiří Novák and Miriam Oremans in the third round, 15th seeds Donald Johnson and Karina Habšudová in the quarterfinal, and Kimberly Po and David Rikl in the semifinal. In the final, they faced Mike Bryan and Liezel Huber, winning in three sets. It was then-18-year-old Hantuchová's first ever Grand Slam final appearance and victory.

In July, Hantuchová was knocked out in the first round of the Austrian Open by Maja Palaveršić and played in the PreCon Open in Basel, losing to Marie-Gaianeh Mikaelian in the quarterfinal. She also took part in the doubles, partnering with Magüi Serna and reaching the semifinals. Her next three tournaments were the Canada Masters, where she lost to Jennifer Capriati in the second round; the New Haven Open, where she lost to Květa Peschke in the third qualifying round; and the US Open, where she lost to Nathalie Dechy in the first round.

In September, Hantuchová played in the Sparkassen Cup. She progressed through three qualifying rounds, beat Henrieta Nagyová in the first round and Jelena Dokic in the second round before losing to Elena Dementieva in the quarterfinal. In October, Hantuchová won three qualifying matches at the Porsche Tennis Grand Prix but lost to Patty Schnyder in the first round. At the Zurich Open, she won three qualifying matches, beat Meghann Shaughnessy and Barbara Schett and lost to eventual winner Lindsay Davenport in the quarterfinals. Her final event was the Luxembourg Open, where she lost to Anna Kournikova in the second round. She also played in the doubles with Elena Bovina, reaching her second final of the year. They were unsuccessful, however, losing to Bianka Lamade and Patty Schnyder.

=== 2002: Breakthrough year, Australian Open doubles final & mixed doubles title ===
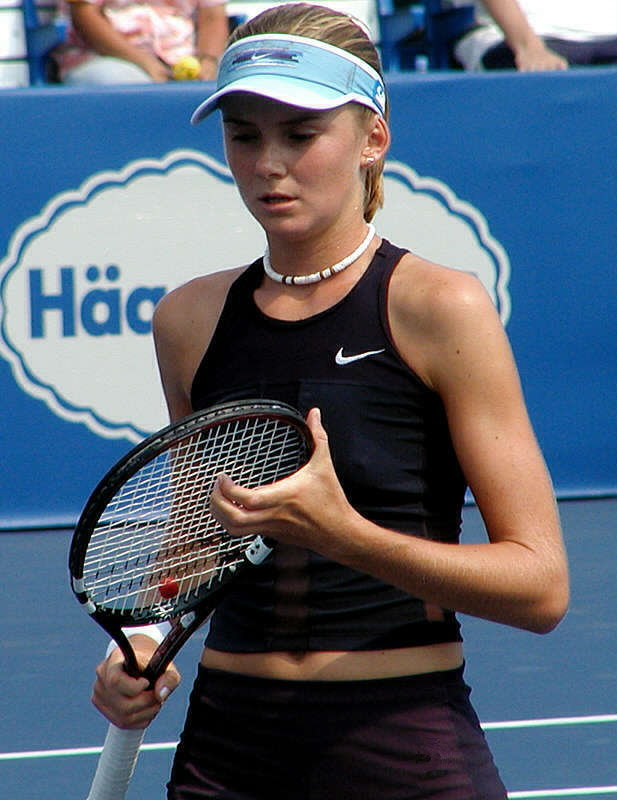
Hantuchová in 2005

Hantuchová started the year as the world No. 38 at the Gold Coast Hardcourts, where she lost to Justine Henin in the second round. At the Sydney International, Hantuchová was knocked out in the second round by Meghann Shaughnessy and went on to play at the Australian Open. In the singles, she was seeded 32nd and lost in the third round to second seed Venus Williams. In the doubles, she and partner Arantxa Sánchez Vicario were seeded thirteenth and reached the final, where they lost to Martina Hingis and Anna Kournikova. In the mixed doubles, she and partner Kevin Ullyett also reached the final, where they beat Gastón Etlis and Paola Suárez, securing Hantuchová her second Grand Slam title in as many years.

At the Open Gaz de France and the Proximus Diamond Games, Hantuchová lost in the second round, to Francesca Schiavone and Dája Bedáňová, respectively. In March, she went into the Indian Wells Open ranked world No. 25, defeating Tatiana Poutchek, Barbara Schett, Justine Henin, Lisa Raymond, and Emmanuelle Gagliardi en route to the final, where she beat world No. 4, Martina Hingis. It was her first WTA Tour tournament win and she was the lowest-ranked player to ever win the event. She also reached the semifinals of the doubles, where she and Arantxa Sánchez Vicario lost to eventual champions Lisa Raymond and Rennae Stubbs. The following month at the Miami Open, the Amelia Island Championships and the Family Circle Cup, Hantuchová lost in the second round, to Cara Black, Janette Husárová, and Mary Pierce, respectively. She had more success in the doubles. Continuing her partnership with Vicario, they won at Amelia Island and reached the semifinals of the Family Circle Cup.

Hantuchová then reached successive singles quarterfinals in Hamburg and Berlin, losing to Martina Hingis and Anna Smashnova, respectively. She and Vicario reached the doubles final of both, losing in Hamburg to Martina Hingis and Barbara Schett and in Berlin to Elena Dementieva and Janette Husárová. At the Italian Open, Hantuchová lost in the first round to Anastasia Myskina. She then entered the French Open as the 11th seed, losing to former champion Monica Seles in the fourth round. In the mixed doubles, she and Kevin Ullyett reached the quarterfinals. In June, she played at the Eastbourne International, reaching the semifinals in the singles and the doubles. At Wimbledon, she again reached the singles quarterfinals, only to be beaten by the eventual champion, Serena Williams. In the doubles, she partnered with former world No. 1, Jennifer Capriati, but they lost in the second round. In the mixed doubles, she and Ullyett reached their second Grand Slam final of the year. This time, they were unsuccessful, losing to Mahesh Bhupathi and Elena Likhovtseva.

Her US Open Series was modest, as she lost in the second round of San Diego and Los Angeles, after having first-round byes in both tournaments. She reached the semifinals of the Tier-I-event in Montreal, losing to Amélie Mauresmo, and New Haven, losing to world No. 2, Venus Williams. At the final major of the year, Hantuchová defeated 1997 French Open champion Iva Majoli in round three, and world No. 6, Justine Henin, only to be beaten in her second consecutive Grand Slam quarterfinal by Serena Williams (who again went on to win the title).

Later that year, Hantuchová also reached the quarterfinals in Leipzig and the final in Filderstadt, losing to Kim Clijsters. The second set was the only set Hantuchová had taken from Clijsters in their nine meetings. She then went on to reach the quarterfinals of Zurich, losing to eventual champion, Patty Schnyder in three tight sets, and the semifinals in Linz, and winning both of her singles rubbers in the Fed Cup final. This impressive season amassed her enough points to compete at the annual Tour Championships, losing in the first round to 17th ranked Magdalena Maleeva. Hantuchová's record for the year was 56–25 and 6–10 against top-10 players; 6–2 in singles Fed Cup play; 10–6 on indoor carpet, 6–2 on grass, 11–7 on clay, and 29–10 on hardcourts.

=== 2003: World No. 5, a tough year ===
Hantuchová started 2003 solidly, reaching the quarterfinals at her first three events in Sydney, losing to Lindsay Davenport, Venus Williams, at the Australian Open (her third Grand Slam quarterfinal in a row), and Elena Dementieva in Paris. Hantuchová reached her first semifinal of the year at her fourth event in Antwerp, losing to Williams again. By then, Hantuchová's ranking was at a career-high No. 5. Defending a title for the first time in her career, Hantuchová advanced to the fourth round in Indian Wells, losing to Amanda Coetzer. Despite a first-round loss to Alicia Molik in Miami, Hantuchová rebounded in the Tier-I Charleston event, making her fifth quarterfinal in seven events, losing to Ashley Harkleroad. She made her sixth quarterfinal at her next event in Amelia Island, losing to eventual champion Dementieva. Hantuchová went undefeated in first-round Fed Cup play against Germany, winning both of her matches. Following the Fed Cup, she again made it to the quarterfinals for the seventh time of the year at the Tier-I Berlin tournament, losing to Kim Clijsters.

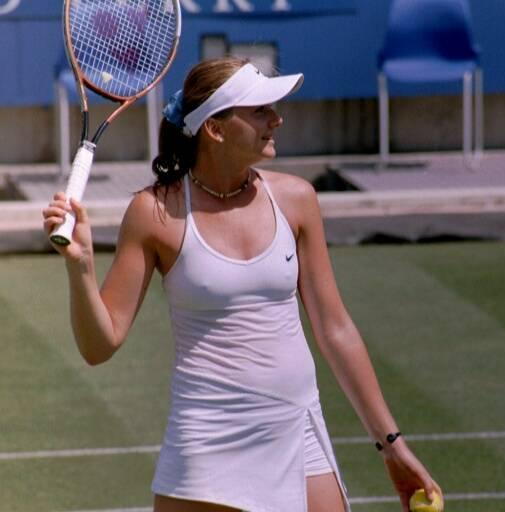
Hantuchová at Eastbourne in 2004

At the French Open, Hantuchová lost in the second round in a marathon match to Harkleroad again, making 101 unforced errors, leading to long-time coach Nigel Sears criticising her attitude publicly. Following the match, her extremely thin physique was noticed for the first time publicly, and some wondered about Hantuchová's health. Kicking off the grass season in Eastbourne, Hantuchová lost in the quarterfinals to Conchita Martínez, but more famously she lost in the second round of Wimbledon to Shinobu Asagoe, with Hantuchová breaking down crying during the latter stages of the match and making 57 unforced errors. Some theorized that the media's continued interest regarding her weight and the pressure of success at 19 years of age, in addition to her on-court breakdown and her parents' divorce, as well as her coach's walking out in the middle of the match, led to this breakdown. Following Wimbledon, Hantuchová went 6–8 for the rest of the year, 0–4 against top-ten players She ended the year with an overall record of 28–23, and she fell to No. 17 in the world. Further signs of the pressure and problems she was facing during this period was that, in July, she made herself unavailable for Slovakia in the Fed Cup in order to concentrate on her singles career, and in November she parted company with Sears.

=== 2004: Eastbourne final ===
2004 proved to be a continuation of Hantuchová's poor second half of 2003, with many of the same struggles (she briefly hired Harold Solomon, who had previously coached her friend Jennifer Capriati, as well as Anna Kournikova, before re-hiring Sears in March), She reached just three quarterfinals, the first at the first Tier-I event in Tokyo was not until halfway through the season. At Tokyo, however, she garnered her thus far only victory over Maria Sharapova in the second round, falling to Davenport in the quarterfinals. The tournament that saved her from a poor 2004 was Eastbourne, in which she defeated Sugiyama in the quarterfinals, and Mauresmo in the semifinals, before losing to Kuznetsova in the third final of her career. However, Hantuchová was serving for the championship, up 6–2, 6–5, but was broken.

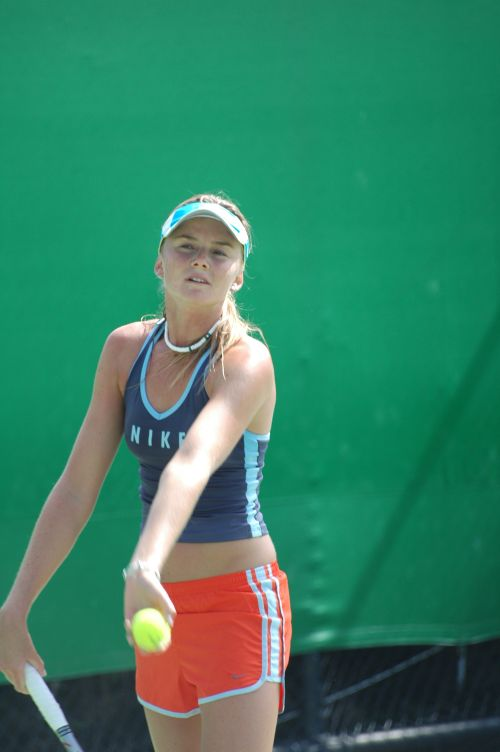
Hantuchová practicing during the Australian Open in 2005

Hantuchová was ranked No. 54 as she entered Eastbourne, but found herself ranked No. 38 as she went into Wimbledon, losing to eventual champion Sharapova in the third round. Hantuchová made one more quarterfinal at New Haven, losing to Lisa Raymond. At the US Open one week later, Hantuchová lost in three sets to Patty Schnyder in the third round. She finished the year ranked no. 31, with a 24–24 win–loss record. She finished 1–4 against top-10 players overall, the sole victory over Mauresmo.

=== 2005: Two mixed-doubles titles, and career Grand Slam in mixed doubles ===
Hantuchová reached the third round of the Australian Open, losing to Dementieva in a tight three-setter. Following that, she made her first quarterfinal of the year in Tokyo for the second straight year, losing to Kuznetsova. At her next event, she reached the semifinals in Doha, losing to Sharapova. Then, she made another quarterfinal at her next tournament in Dubai, losing to Serena Williams. At Dubai also, in the first round, she garnered her tenth top-10 victory over No. 8 Alicia Molik. Hantuchová made the third round at the French Open and Wimbledon, losing to Clijsters in Paris, and eventual champion Venus Williams in England.

Hantuchová had a successful US Open series run, where she reached the semifinals in Cincinnati, getting upset by world No. 74, Akiko Morigami. In Stanford, Hantuchová lost to Clijsters in the quarterfinals. After a second-round loss in San Diego to Sugiyama, Hantuchová reached her fourth final in Los Angeles, getting a walkover in the quarterfinals over Sharapova, and got revenge against Dementieva in the semifinals. In the final, for the seventh time in their head-to-head, Clijsters defeated Hantuchová in straight sets. For the third time at the event, Hantuchová made the quarterfinals in New Haven, before losing to Davenport.

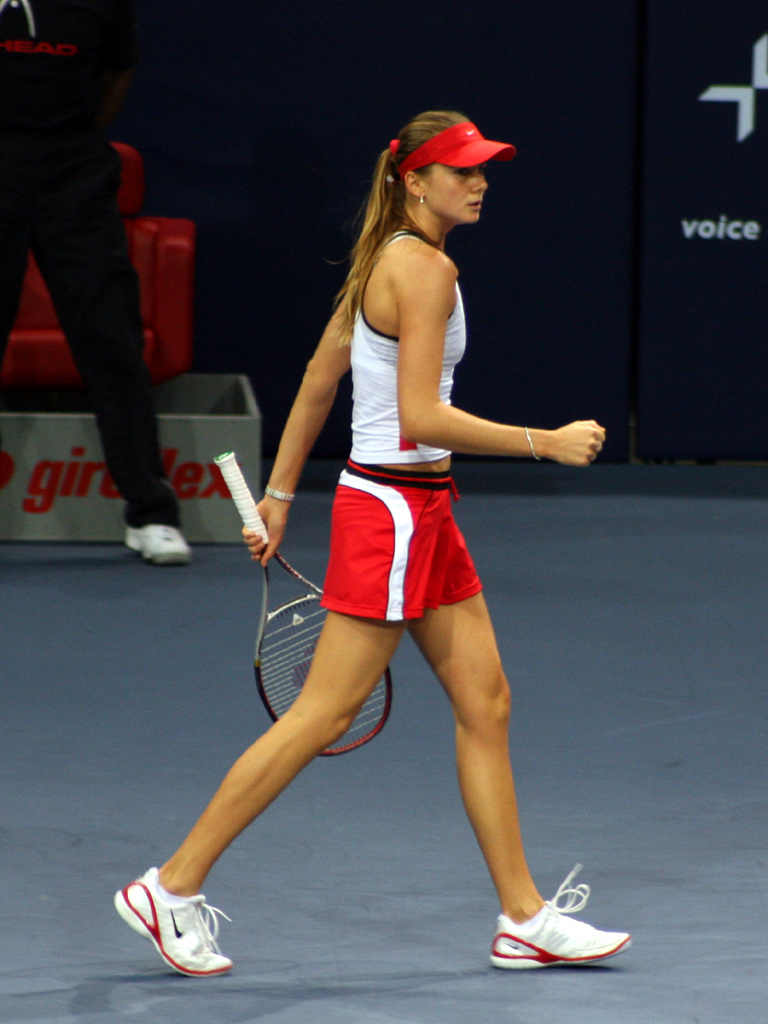
Hantuchová at the Zurich Open in 2006

Hantuchová lost to eventual quarterfinalist Venus Williams in the third round at the US Open. She won the mixed doubles, completing a career grand slam in mixed doubles. She has largely retired from the mixed doubles since then, saying that she "felt like it's time to move on and focus on my singles." In Luxembourg, Hantuchová made her eighth quarterfinal of the season, losing to Nathalie Dechy. In Filderstadt the following week, Hantuchová made the semifinals, her third of the year, defeating No. 10 Patty Schnyder in the second round and Flavia Pennetta in the quarterfinals. She lost to Davenport in the semifinals. At the final Tier-I event of the year, Hantuchová pushed Davenport to three sets and had match points in the second set in Zurich, before losing. In her final event of the year, in Linz, Hantuchová made her tenth quarterfinal, losing to Schnyder. Hantuchová finished 2005 with a 3–10 record against the top 10, 37–25 overall record, with 2–1 on indoor carpet, 3–4 on clay, 2–3 on grass, and 30–17 on hardcourts, reaching ten quarterfinals, three semifinals, and one final.

=== 2006: French Open doubles final ===
Hantuchová reached the quarterfinals of Sydney in 2006 with a win over top-ten player Patty Schnyder and got to the semifinals of Auckland. She continued this form at the Australian Open with her third-round victory over defending champion and seven-time Grand Slam winner Serena Williams, who had entered the tournament with a lack of match practice and questions over her fitness. This victory (the only over Serena in her career) ensured that Hantuchová would progress to the fourth round of a Grand Slam tournament for the first time in three years. She lost to fourth-seeded Maria Sharapova in straight sets in the fourth round.

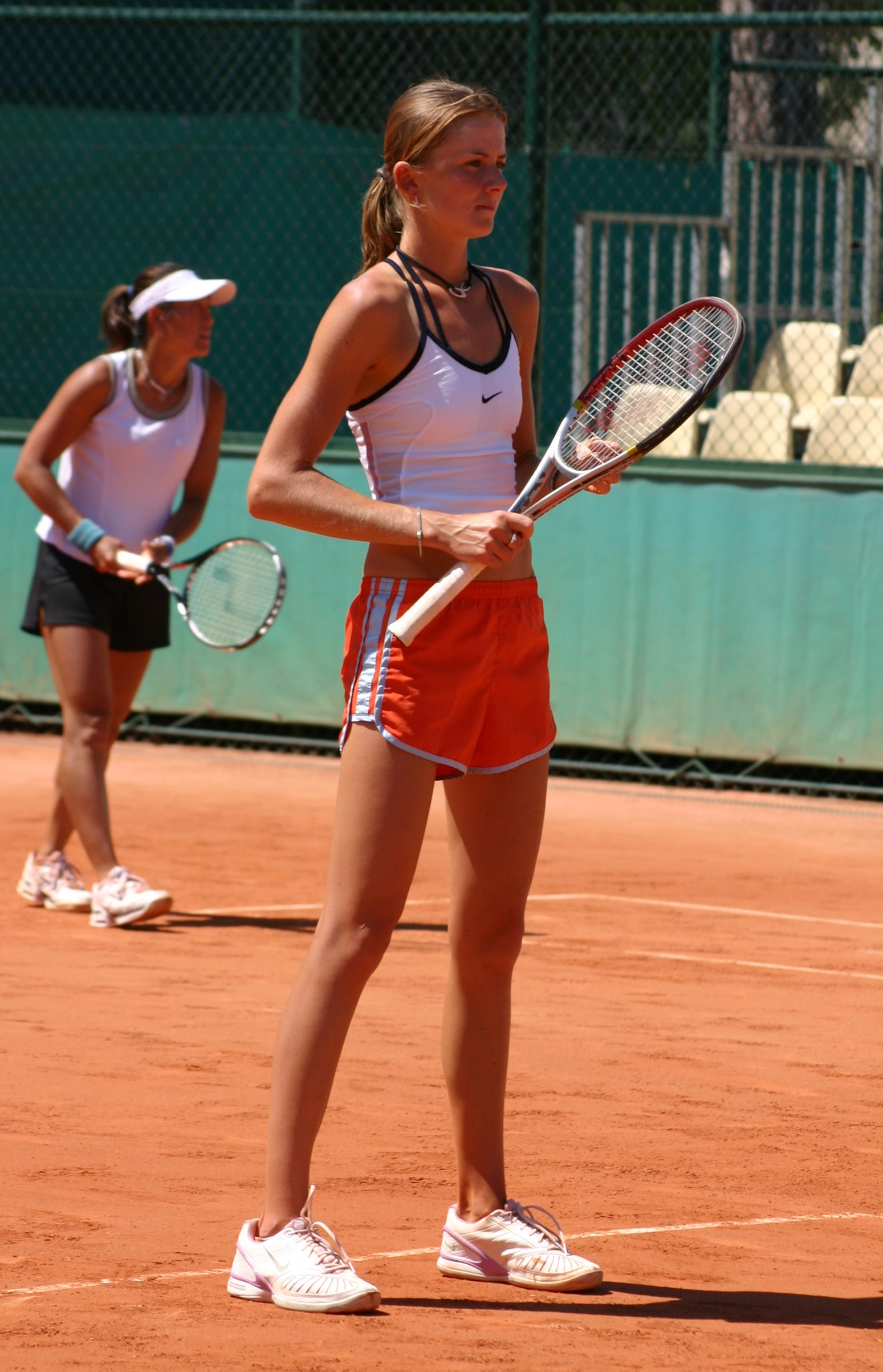
Hantuchová with doubles partner Ai Sugiyama at the French Open in 2006

Thereafter, she did not find a consistent level of form. Prior to the clay-court season, she parted company for a second time (and permanently) with Sears. He was replaced by Angel Giminez. She then played her first Fed Cup matches for Slovakia in almost three years. It was a successful return, with Hantuchová winning both her singles and her doubles matches against Luxembourg, her singles match against The Netherlands, and the decisive singles rubber in the tie against Great Britain. With the help of Hantuchová's 4–0 record, Slovakia booked a place in the World Group II play-off against Thailand.

Despite disappointing results in the warm-up tournaments, she reached the fourth round of both the French Open and Wimbledon, before extending her 2006 Fed Cup record to 6–0 by winning both her singles matches in Slovakia's 5–0 rout of Thailand, which ensured their promotion to the World Group II. Her fourth-round streak at Grand Slams ended when she was beaten by a resurgent Serena Williams in the second round of the US Open, which was the culmination of a very disappointing American hardcourt season (her record was 7–6 including the US Open, failing to get past the round of 16 of any of the tournaments she entered).

Hantuchová beat Tatiana Golovin in straight sets, before losing to Dinara Safina. The following week, she reached the quarterfinals of Stuttgart with an easy victory over the then top-ten player Safina in the second round. This was both her first victory over a top-ten player and first appearance in a quarterfinal since January. In October 2006, Hantuchová reached the final of the Zurich Open. In the first round, she upset sixth seed Patty Schnyder. In the second round, she defeated her doubles partner Ai Sugiyama. Hantuchová was then scheduled to play world No. 1 Amélie Mauresmo in the quarterfinals. However, Mauresmo withdrew due to a right shoulder injury. In the semifinals, Hantuchová upset world No. 4, Svetlana Kuznetsova to reach the final of the Tier-I event. In the final, Hantuchová lost in a three-setter to second seed Maria Sharapova. The results in this tournament were the culmination of Hantuchová's up-turn of form, which kept her in the top 20, as she had arrived in Zurich outside the top group for the first time in over 11 months. The injury she suffered to her right rib after Mary Pierce hit a shot at her in doubles, caused her the most serious injury of her career and also forced her to retire in her match against Vesnina the following week in Linz. Hantuchová finished the year ranked No. 17 in the world, with a 34–25 record. She went 24–17 on hardcourts, 5–4 on clay, 3–2 on grass, and 2–2 on carpet. She was 4–6 against top-10 players, beating Schnyder twice, Safina, and Kuznetsova, with losses to Sharapova (twice), Clijsters, Henin-Hardenne, Dementieva, and Nadia Petrova.

=== 2007: Winning in Indian Wells for the second time ===
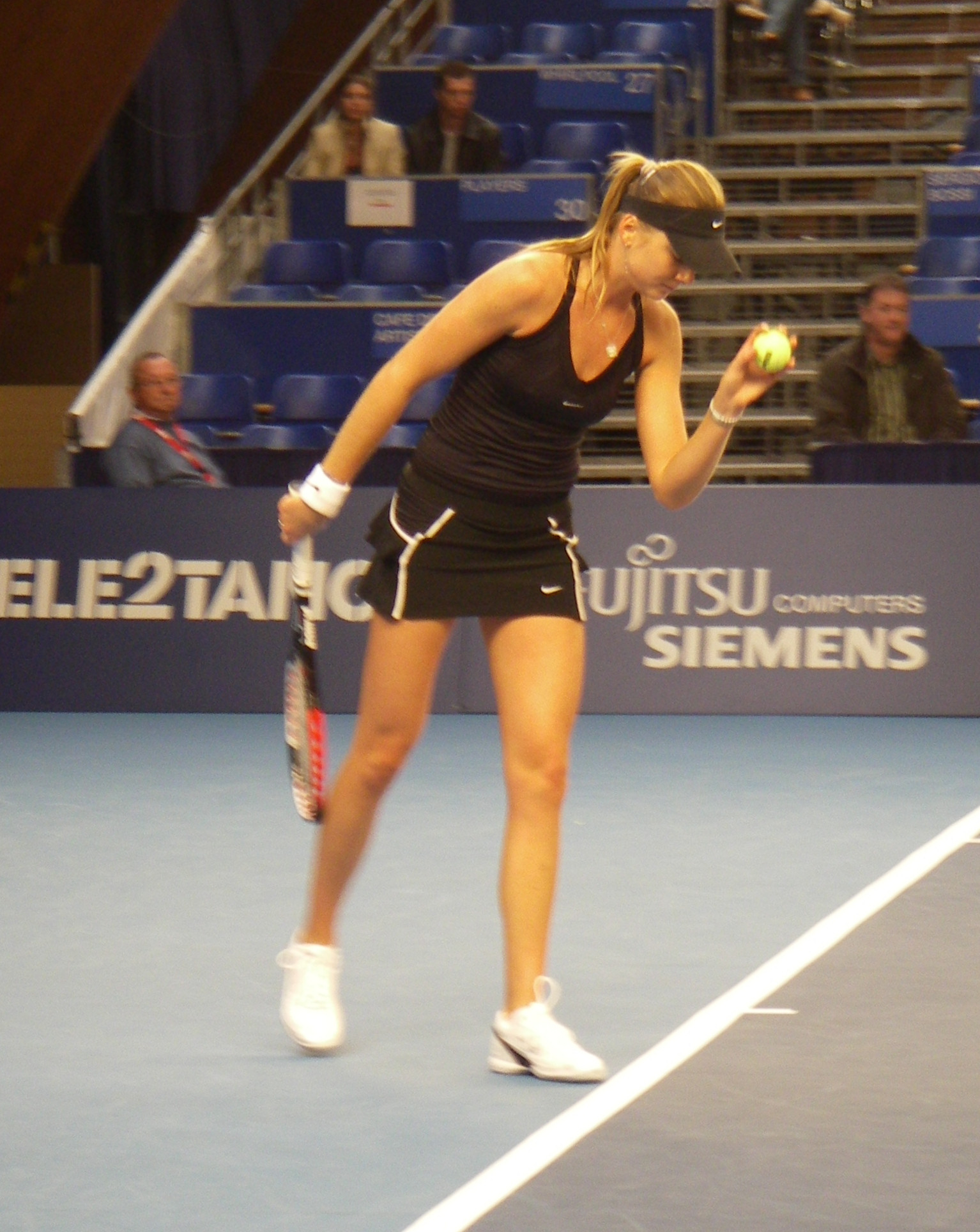
Hantuchová at the 2007 Luxembourg Open

Hantuchová's first tournament of the year was at the Auckland Open, where she lost in the second round to Virginie Razzano. Hantuchová then lost to Nicole Vaidišová in the first round of the Tier-II Sydney International and reached her second consecutive Australian Open fourth round, where she lost to world No. 5, Kim Clijsters.

Hantuchová was then upset in the first round of the Tier-I Pan Pacific Open in Tokyo by Roberta Vinci. Three weeks later at the Tier-II Dubai Championships, Hantuchová defeated Maria Kirilenko in the second round, before losing her quarterfinal match against Amélie Mauresmo, in three sets. The following week at the Tier-II Qatar Open, Hantuchová trailed world No. 6, Martina Hingis, in their quarterfinal match 4–1 in the second set, before coming back to win. She then lost her semifinal match against world No. 5, Svetlana Kuznetsova. In her seventh tournament of the year, Hantuchová won six matches, the last four of which were upsets of higher seeded players, to win the Tier I Indian Wells Open. She upset Hingis in the fourth round, Shahar Pe'er in the quarterfinals, Li Na in the semifinals, and Kuznetsova in the final in straight sets.

Hantuchová, however, struggled in her next four events. She was upset in the third round of the Tier I Miami Open in Key Biscayne by Vera Zvonareva. On clay at Amelia Island, Hantuchová lost to Sybille Bammer in the quarterfinals. Two weeks later, Hantuchová lost both of her Fed Cup matches against the Czech Republic in Bratislava on clay, losing to Vaidišová and Lucie Šafářová. Losing her fourth consecutive match, Hantuchová was upset in the first round of the Tier I German Open in Berlin by Zuzana Ondrášková. Hantuchová then reached her first career clay-court semifinal at the Italian Open in Rome. She upset seventh-seeded Anna Chakvetadze in the third round, before losing to second-seeded Kuznetsova in the semifinals. At the French Open, Hantuchová was upset in the third round by Anabel Medina Garrigues.

After defeating Eleni Daniilidou in the third round of the Tier III grass-court Birmingham Classic, Hantuchová returned to the top 10 for the first time since August 2003. She then lost to Marion Bartoli in the quarterfinals, in three sets. The following week at the Tier III Rosmalen Open in 's-Hertogenbosch, Hantuchová defeated world No. 6, Ana Ivanovic, before losing to Chakvetadze in the semifinals. This result caused Hantuchová to drop out of the top 10. Hantuchová was the tenth-seeded player at Wimbledon and did not lose a set in her first two matches. She then defeated Slovenian Katarina Srebotnik in the third round, before losing to world No. 8, Serena Williams, in the fourth round. Immediately after Wimbledon, Hantuchová helped Slovakia win its Fed Cup World Group II play-off against Serbia. On an indoor hardcourt in Košice, she beat Ana Timotić and Vojislava Lukić.

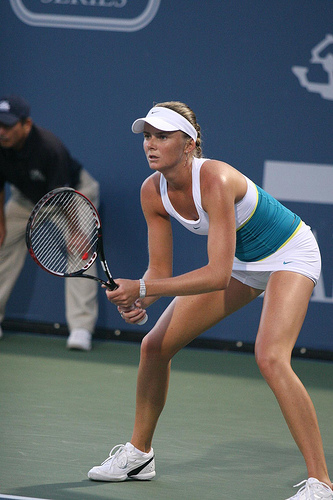
Hantuchová at the 2007 Silicon Valley Classic

Hantuchová played five tournaments during the North American summer hard-court season. She began the US Open Series by losing to Chakvetadze in the semifinals of the Tier-II Silicon Valley Classic in San Jose. This result put her back in the top ten. At the Tier-I San Diego Classic, she lost to world No. 16, Venus Williams, in the second round. The following week at the Tier-II LA Championships, Hantuchová retired from her third-round match with Elena Dementieva while trailing, 3–6, 1–4. Hantuchová once again fell out of the top 10, after losing in the second round of the Tier-II Connecticut Open in New Haven to eventual runner-up, Ágnes Szávay. At the US Open, Hantuchová was the ninth-seeded player but lost to Ukraine's Julia Vakulenko in the first round. It was Hantuchová's earliest loss at this tournament since her debut in 2001 and her earliest loss at a Grand Slam tournament since the 2004 French Open.

Hantuchová then played four consecutive tournaments. She reached her second final of the year at the Tier-III Bali Classic, losing to Lindsay Davenport in three sets. At the Tier-III Sunfeast Open in Kolkata, Hantuchová lost in the semifinals to Maria Kirilenko, but re-entered the top 10. Traveling back to Europe, Hantuchová played in the Tier II Luxembourg Open. She defeated Patty Schnyder in the quarterfinals and Bartoli in the semifinals to advance to her third final of the year for the first time in her career. Hantuchová then lost to Ivanovic in the final, after leading the match, 6–3, 3–0. At the Porsche Tennis Grand Prix in Stuttgart, Hantuchová defeated Šafářová in the first round, but lost in the second round to Dementieva. This loss, however, did not prevent Hantuchová from rising to world No. 9, her highest ranking in over four years.

At the Tier-I Zurich Open, Hantuchová defeated Dinara Safina in the first round, before losing to Agnieszka Radwańska. One week later, Hantuchová won her third career title at the Tier-II Generali Ladies Linz. In the semifinals, she defeated Vaidišová for the first time in her career. Hantuchová then defeated Schnyder in a straight-sets final. This title enabled Hantuchová to qualify for the year-end WTA Tour Championships in Madrid. But Hantuchová did not advance past the round-robin stage. She lost to Sharapova and Ivanovic, before beating Kuznetsova to finish third in her group. Hantuchová's win–loss record for 2007 was 52–28. She was 6–11 versus top-10 players, with two victories against Hingis, two against Kuznetsova, one against Ivanovic, and one against Chakvetadze. The losses were to Clijsters, Mauresmo, Chakvetadze (twice), Kuznetsova (twice), Vaidišová, Serena Williams, Ivanovic (twice), and Sharapova. Hantuchová finished the year at world No. 9, her first top-ten finish since 2002.

=== 2008: First major semifinal ===
Hantuchová at the Australian Open in 2008

She started the year at the Medibank International in Sydney. She defeated Dinara Safina in the first round, before losing to world No. 12, Nicole Vaidišová, in the second round. At the Australian Open, Hantuchová reached her first major semifinal. She won her first three matches without losing a set. In the quarterfinals, she beat Polish teenager Agnieszka Radwańska, who had defeated second-seeded Svetlana Kuznetsova and Nadia Petrova in earlier rounds. Hantuchová then lost to Ana Ivanovic in the semifinals, despite Hantuchová having won the first set 6–0, and leading the second set 2–0. After the match, Hantuchová claimed that Ivanovic had been distracting her by squeaking her shoes on the court before serving, a claim Ivanovic disputed. Hantuchová's performance at this tournament caused her ranking to improve one spot to world No. 8.

Hantuchová then played two indoor tournaments in Europe. At the Open Gaz de France in Paris, she lost to seventh-seeded Ágnes Szávay in the quarterfinals. She was the third-seeded player at Antwerp, where she again reached the quarterfinals. A blister on her right hand caused Hantuchová to retire during the quarterfinal against Timea Bacsinszky.

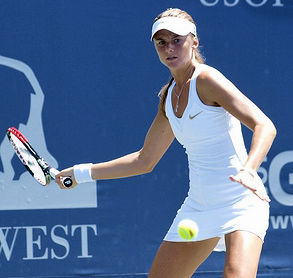
Hantuchová in July 2008

Hantuchová was then scheduled to play at the Qatar Open, the first Tier-I event of the year, and the Dubai Championships, a Tier-II event, but withdrew from both because of fatigue. Hantuchová played both of the two-week Tier I events in the United States. At Indian Wells, Hantuchová was the defending champion and fifth seed. She lost to fourth-seeded Maria Sharapova in the quarterfinals. In doubles, Hantuchová and Ai Sugiyama lost in the semifinals to Safina and Elena Vesnina, the eventual champions. At the Miami Open, Hantuchová failed to reach the fourth round for the ninth consecutive year. She lost to former doubles partner Sugiyama in the third round, despite leading 3–0 in the third set. In doubles, Hantuchová partnered with Lindsay Davenport to reach the quarterfinals, where they lost to Sugiyama and Katarina Srebotnik, who went on to win the event.

The following week at the Tier-II event on clay in Amelia Island, Hantuchová was the third seed, but lost in the second round to Karolina Šprem. Hantuchová spent the month of May and most of June recovering from a stress fracture in her right foot, which resulted in her withdrawal from the Tier-I Italian Open in Rome, the Tier III İstanbul Cup, the French Open, and the Rosmalen Open in 's-Hertogenbosch. She recovered in time for Wimbledon, but lost in the second round to unseeded Alisa Kleybanova.

Hantuchová played four hardcourt tournaments between Wimbledon and the US Open. She lost in the second round of the Silicon Valley Classic in San Jose and in the second round of the following week's tournament, the East West Bank Classic in Los Angeles. Hantuchová was seeded tenth at the Beijing Olympics. She defeated Sugiyama in the first round, before losing in the second round to Caroline Wozniacki. The following week at the Pilot Pen Tennis tournament in New Haven, Hantuchová lost in the quarterfinals to Alizé Cornet. Hantuchová was seeded eleventh at the US Open, where she was upset in the first round by qualifier Anna-Lena Grönefeld.

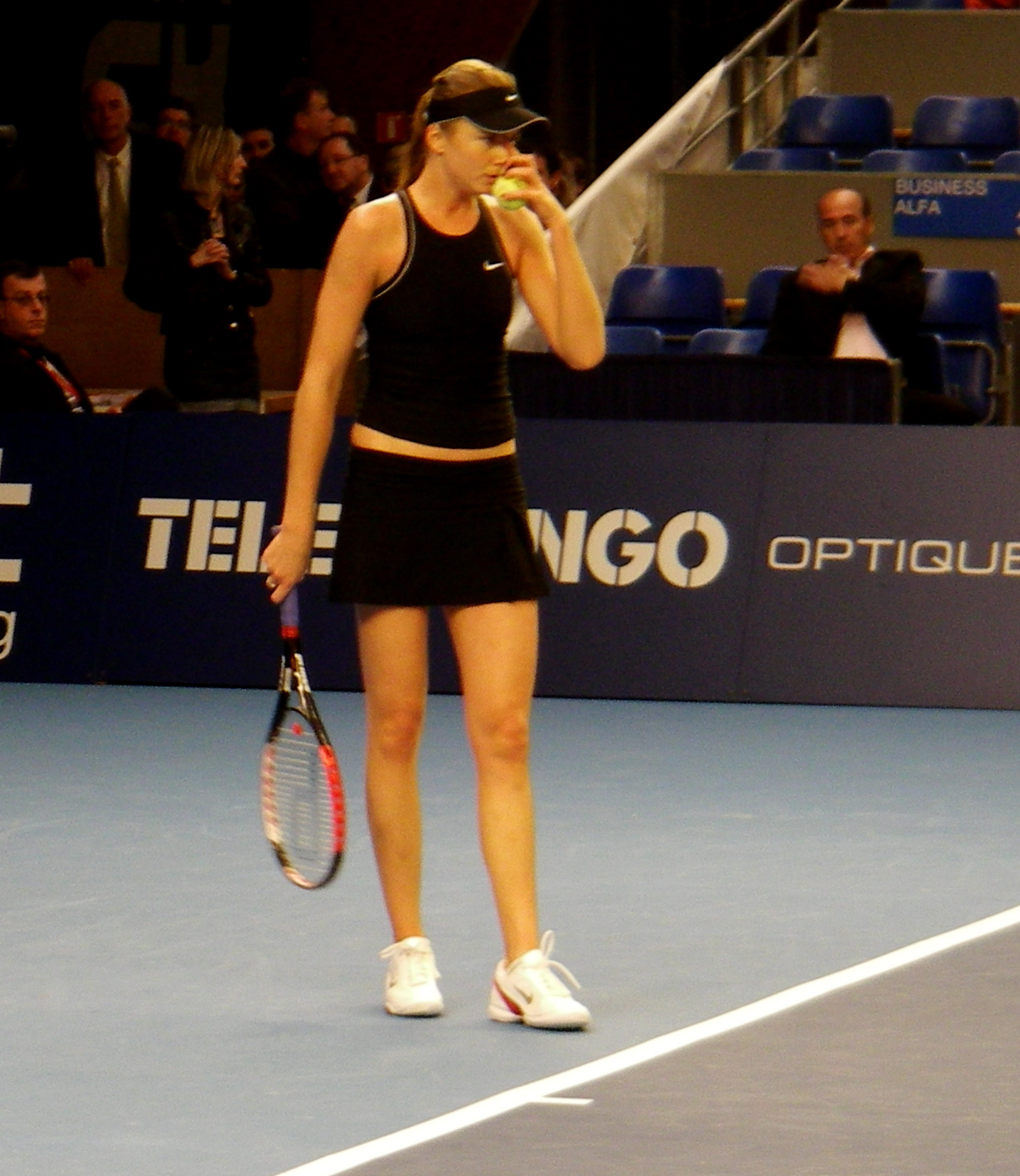
Hantuchová at the 2008 Fortis Championships

To end the year, Hantuchová played seven tournaments in Asia and Europe. She lost in the semifinals of the Commonwealth Classic in Bali and in the first round of the Tier-I Pan Pacific Open in Tokyo to Francesca Schiavone. In Beijing at the China Open, she lost to world No. 2, Jelena Janković, in the quarterfinals. After losing in the first round of the Porsche Grand Prix in Stuttgart, the second round of the Tier-I Kremlin Cup in Moscow, and the second round of the Zurich Open, Hantuchová was seeded third at the Luxembourg Open. However, she lost to world No. 39, Sorana Cîrstea, in the quarterfinals. Because she won only 11 of 26 singles matches after the Indian Wells tournament, Hantuchová finished the year ranked world No. 21, her lowest year-end ranking and first finish out of the top 20 since 2004. She was 0–5 during the year versus players ranked in the top ten at the time the matches were played, with losses to Ivanovic, Sharapova, Janković, and Zvonareva (twice).

=== 2009: Australian Open doubles runner-up and consistent results in singles ===
Hantuchová began the 2009 WTA Tour by participating in the Brisbane International as the tournament's fourth-seeded player. She was upset in the first round by Sara Errani. Hantuchová then played the Sydney International, where she lost in the second round to sixth-seeded Agnieszka Radwańska.

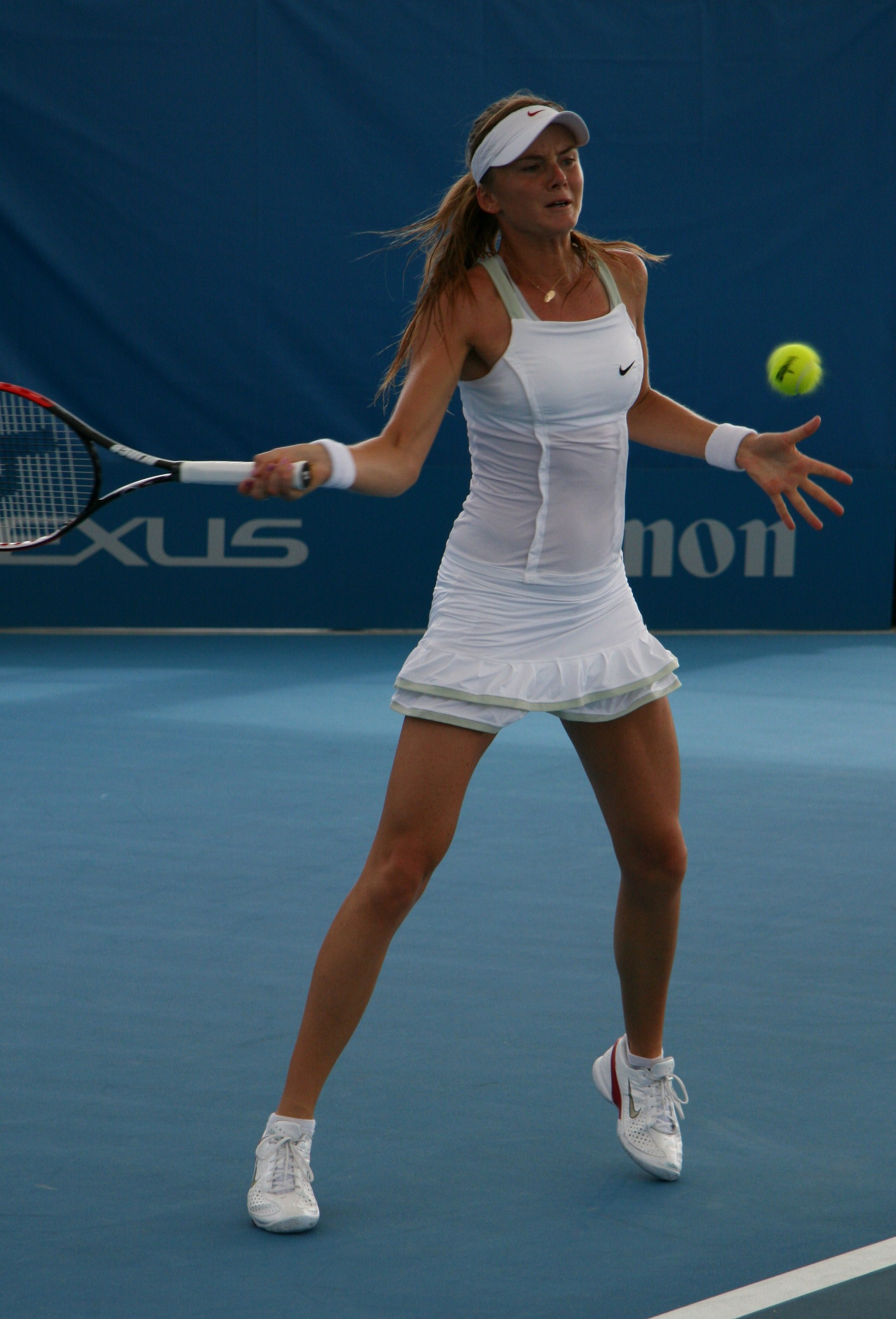
Hantuchová at the 2009 Brisbane International

At the Australian Open, Hantuchová was seeded 19th and defeated home favorite Casey Dellacqua in their first-round match. She then beat Mathilde Johansson of France in the second round, before losing to 15th-seeded Alizé Cornet in the third round in three sets. In the doubles competition, Hantuchová and her partner Ai Sugiyama made it to the final, where they lost to Serena and Venus Williams.

At the Paris Indoors, Hantuchová beat Ekaterina Makarova in the first round, before losing to Cornet in the second round. This was the third consecutive time she has lost to Cornet. Hantuchová then played in the Dubai Championships, where she lost to eventual runner-up Virginie Razzano in the third round. Because of her results at this tournament, Hantuchová's ranking improved five places to world No. 36. At Indian Wells, Hantuchová was the only two-time singles champion in the draw. Seeded 30th, Hantuchová fell to Sybille Bammer in the fourth round. Unseeded for the first time since 2001 at the Miami Open, Hantuchová lost to 22nd-seeded Anna Chakvetadze in the second round.

Starting off the spring clay-court season, as a wildcard at the Amelia Island Championships, Hantuchová defeated eighth-seeded Bethanie Mattek-Sands in the second round. She then lost to eventual champion and second seed Caroline Wozniacki in the quarterfinals. Playing in the Fed Cup World Group play-offs, Hantuchová defeated Alizé Cornet in the first-round rubber, but lost to Amélie Mauresmo in her next match.

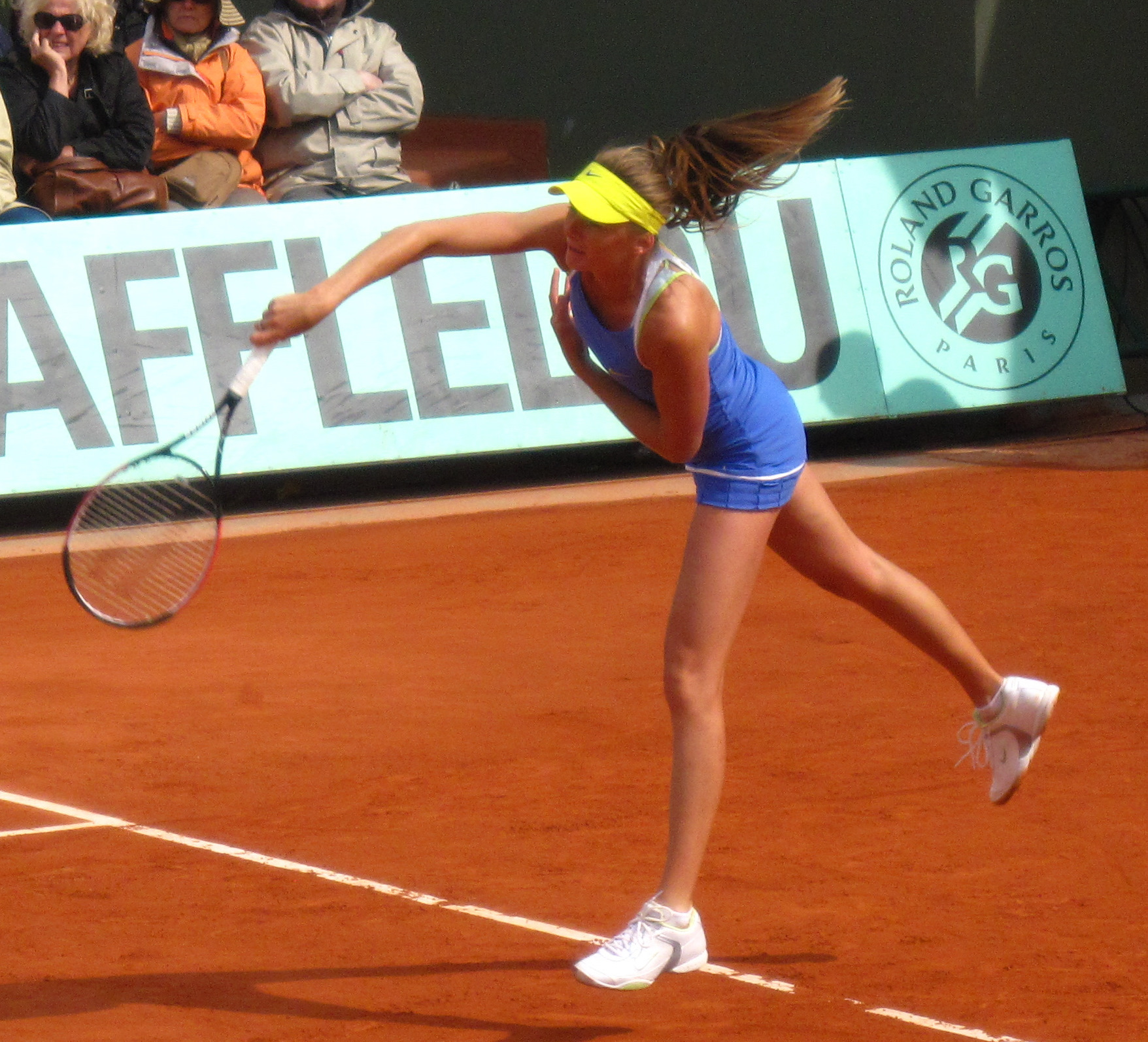
Hantuchová at the French Open in 2009

Hantuchová played four tournaments before Roland Garros on European clay. She lost in the early rounds of the Porsche Tennis Grand Prix, the Rome Masters and the Madrid Masters to Dinara Safina, Svetlana Kuznetsova, and Jelena Janković, respectively. In doubles at Rome, Hantuchová and Ai Sugiyama defeated top seeds Cara Black and Liezel Huber in the quarterfinals. However, the pair lost to Hsieh Su-wei and Peng Shuai in the final. Her fourth event was the Warsaw Open, where she reached her second career clay-court semifinal, but lost to Romanian qualifier and eventual champion Alexandra Dulgheru. Hantuchová was unseeded at the French Open and lost to Frenchwoman Virginie Razzano in the first round.

On grass, Hantuchová was seeded sixth in 's-Hertogenbosch. She fell to top seed Safina in the quarterfinals. Competing at her ninth Wimbledon, Hantuchová was unseeded in singles for the first time since 2004. She came from behind to defeat local teenager Laura Robson in the first round. She then upset 16th seed and the previous year's semifinalist Zheng Jie, and doubles partner Sugiyama. However, Hantuchová fell to second seed and eventual champion Serena Williams in the fourth round.

Hantuchová played her first-round match at the San Jose Open, winning in three sets against defending champion Aleksandra Wozniak. She then defeated seventh seed Agnieszka Radwańska in the second round, but fell to third seed Elena Dementieva in the quarterfinals. In Los Angeles at the LA Championships, she lost to Dinara Safina. In the Western & Southern Open, she lost to Flavia Pennetta, after upsetting seventh seed Vera Zvonareva. In Toronto, she fell to qualifier Yaroslava Shvedova in the first round.

Hantuchová was seeded 22nd at the US Open. She defeated Meghann Shaughnessy, Timea Bacsinszky, and Vania King, but fell in the fourth round to second seed and defending champion Serena Williams.

At the Korea Open, Hantuchová was the top seed, but was upset by eventual champion Kimiko Date-Krumm in the quarterfinals. She then competed in the Pan Pacific Open and the China Open, where she reached the second round in both, before losing in three sets to 11th seed Agnieszka Radwańska and 13th seed Nadia Petrova, respectively.

Hantuchová finished the season in Europe at the Luxembourg Open, where she was upset by unseeded Shahar Pe'er in the quarterfinals.

Hantuchová finished outside the top 20 for the second consecutive year at No. 24, with a win–loss record of 39–25. She went 25–16 on hard courts, 9–7 on clay, and 5–2 on grass. She was 1–9 versus top-10 players, with losses to Radwańska, Kuznetsova, Janković, Dementieva, Serena Williams (twice), and Safina (three times), with the sole victory over Zvonareva.

=== 2010: Steady ranking ===
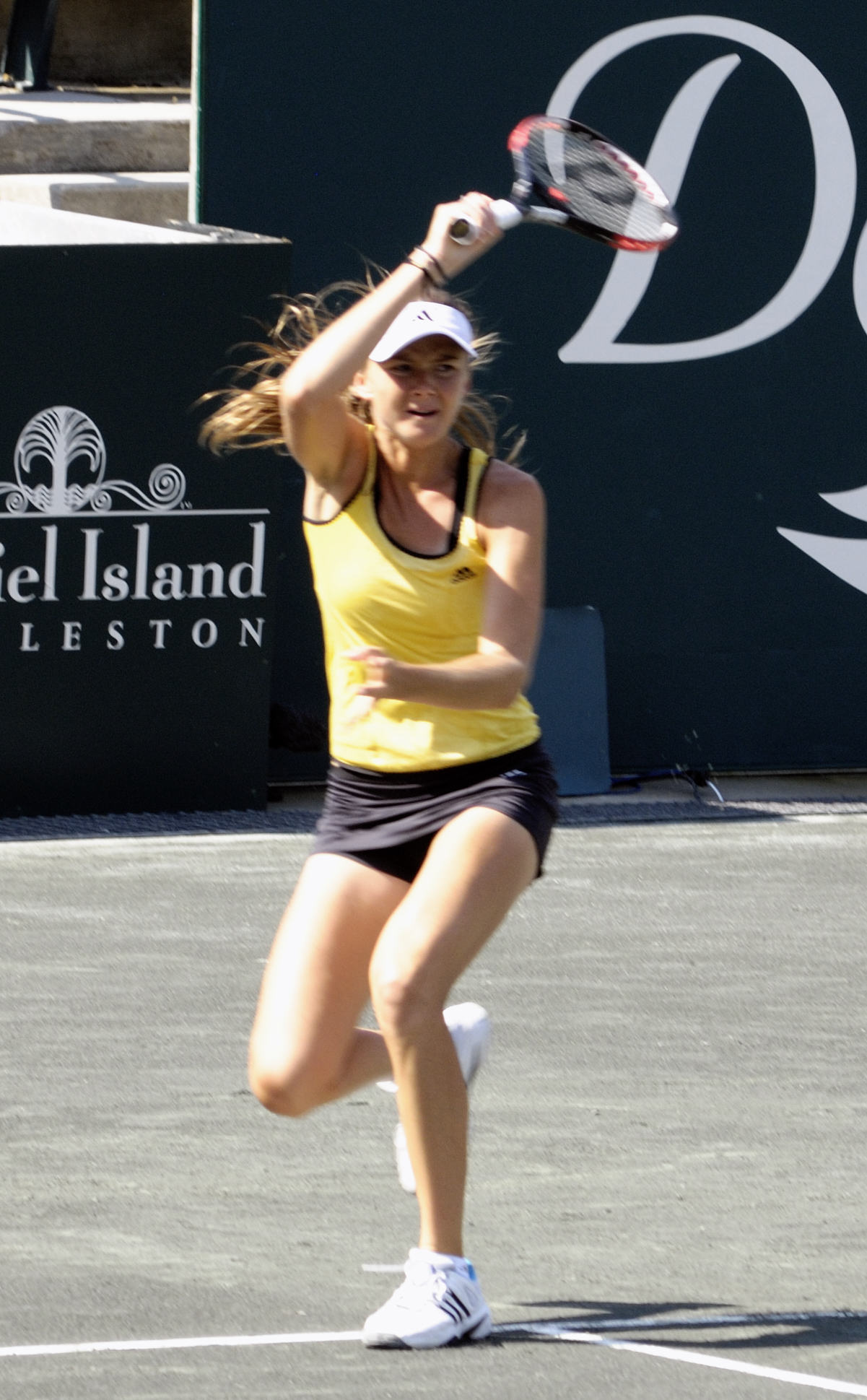
Hantuchová at the Family Circle Cup in 2010

Hantuchová started the 2010 WTA Tour by competing at the Brisbane International. Seeded fourth, Hantuchová was upset by unseeded Andrea Petkovic in the quarterfinals. At the Sydney International, she fell to fifth seed and eventual champion Elena Dementieva in the second round. Seeded 22nd at the Australian Open, Hantuchová fell to 16th seed and eventual semifinalist Li Na in the third round.

Hantuchová defeated Zhang Shuai in the Fed Cup tie against China in Bratislava prior to the Dubai Championships. In Dubai, she upset fifth seed Dementieva through retirement, after winning the first set 6–4. However, she fell to Anastasia Pavlyuchenkova in the third round.

Hantuchová was seeded second at the Monterrey Open. She became one of the favorites after top seed Jelena Janković fell in the first round. Hantuchová fought from a set down to beat unseeded Vania King in the quarterfinals, and fourth seed Dominika Cibulková in the semifinals. However, she fell to third seed Anastasia Pavlyuchenkova in the final. It was Hantuchová's first final since Linz in 2007. Hantuchová was upset at Indian Wells by Roberta Vinci in the second round, after injuring her back during training earlier that day. However, she achieved a career best result at the Miami Open. She reached the fourth round after recording straight-set victories over Patty Schnyder and 16th seed Nadia Petrova, but lost a very tight three-set match to third seed and eventual finalist Venus Williams in nearly three hours.

Hantuchová began the clay-court season by competing at the Charleston Cup in South Carolina. She upset second seed and world No. 7, Jelena Janković in the quarterfinals. However, she fell to fourth seed and eventual champion, Sam Stosur, in her third career clay-court semifinal. Hantuchová then helped Slovakia earn a place in the World Group I for the 2011 Fed Cup by scoring two singles victories and a doubles victory in the World Group play-offs against Serbia. She again defeated world No. 7 Janković in one of her singles matches for a second week in a row. Despite first-round loses in the Italian Open in Rome and in the Madrid Open, Hantuchová rebounded at the French Open. Seeded 23rd, she upset 16th seed Yanina Wickmayer in the third round, but fell to fourth seed Jelena Janković in the fourth round.

Hantuchová played two tournaments on grass. She was defeated by Samantha Stosur at the Eastbourne International and was then upset by Barbora Záhlavová-Strýcová at Wimbledon.

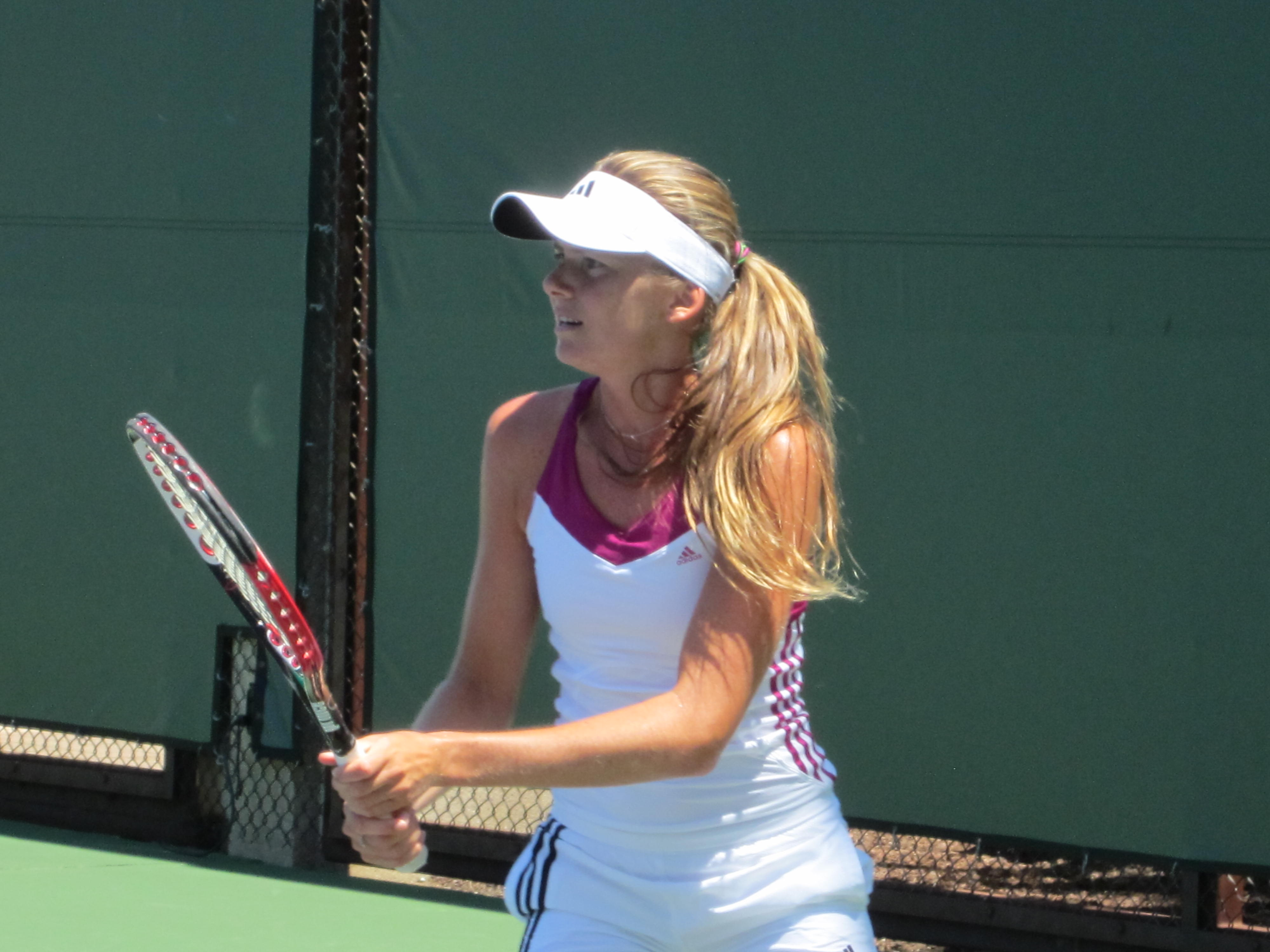
Hantuchová practicing at the Bank of the West Classic in 2010

To start off the US Open Series, Hantuchová lost in the opening-round to sixth seed Shahar Pe'er at the Silicon Valley Classic. At the San Diego Open, she upset sixth seed Marion Bartoli in the first round, saving three match points. She then beat Zheng Jie and Alisa Kleybanova to advance to the semifinals, where she fell to Agnieszka Radwańska in straight sets. Hantuchová then fell in the first rounds of the Cincinnati Open, and the Rogers Cup to eventual semifinalist Anastasia Pavlyuchenkova and 15th seed Flavia Pennetta, respectively. At the New Haven Open, she fell to Dinara Safina.

As the 24th seed, Hantuchová defeated Dinara Safina and Vania King at the US Open, before falling to 12th seed Elena Dementieva in the third round.

Hantuchová fell in the early rounds in both the Pan Pacific Open in Tokyo, Japan and the China Open. At the Generali Ladies Linz, Hantuchová was upset by Patty Schnyder in the quarterfinals. At the Luxembourg Open, she lost again in the early rounds to Angelique Kerber in three sets. Hantuchová received a wildcard to the Tournament of Champions in Bali. She upset Yanina Wickmayer in straight sets, but fell to Alisa Kleybanova in the semifinals. She also lost the third-place match to Kimiko Date-Krumm.

Hantuchová finished outside the top 20 for the third consecutive year at No. 30, with a win–loss record of 35–25. She was 3–5 versus top-10 players, with losses to Dementieva, Venus Williams, Janković, Stosur, and Radwańska, and with victories over Dementieva and Janković (twice).

=== 2011: Fifth career title ===
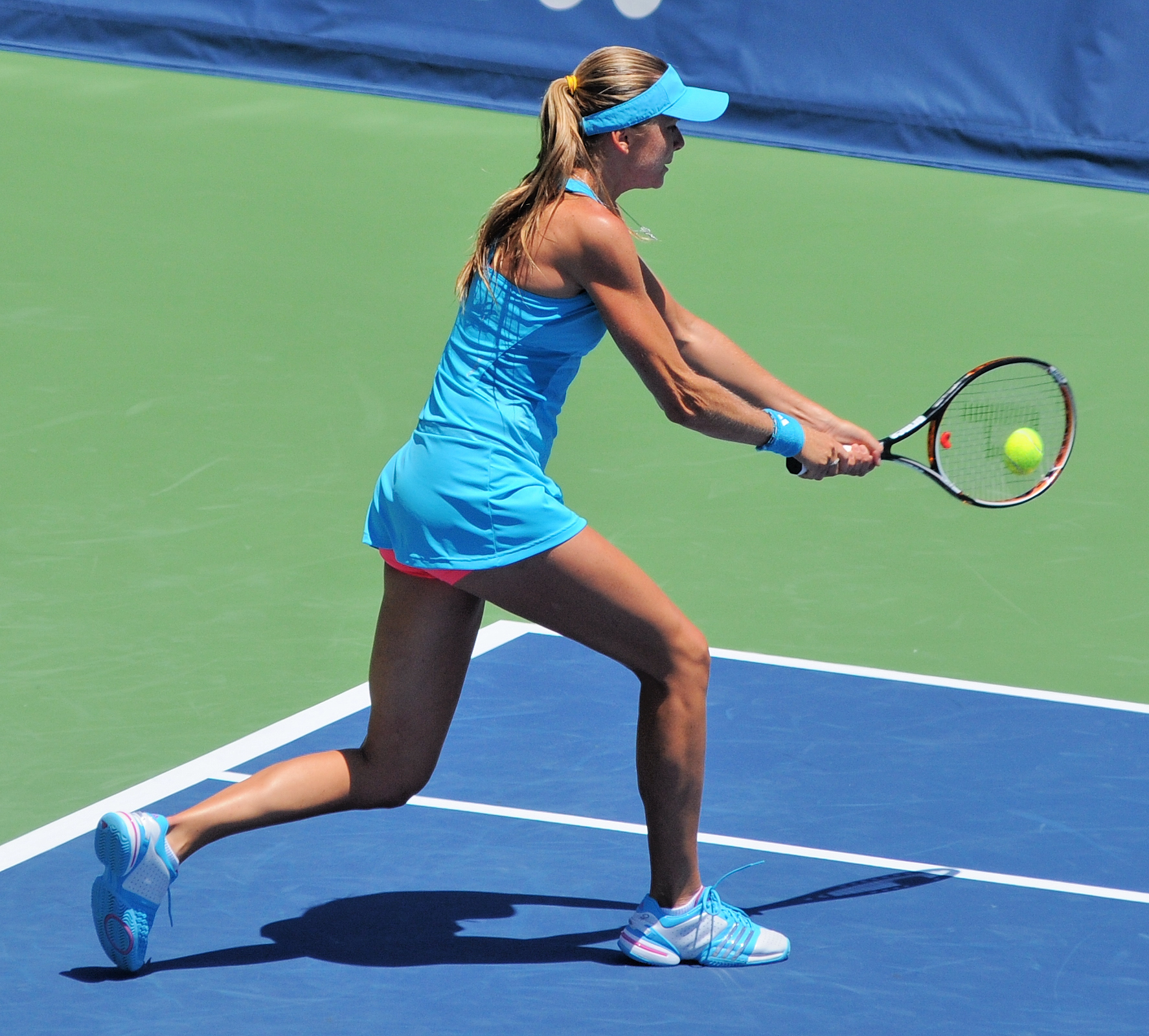
Hantuchová at the Southern California Open in 2011

Hantuchová withdrew from her first tournament of the year at the Brisbane International due to a left Achilles strain. She competed next at the Sydney International, but suffered a loss to María José Martínez Sánchez in the first round. At the Australian Open, she was the 28th seed, but lost in the first round to Regina Kulikova in three sets. This is the first time Hantuchová had lost in the first round of the Australian Open, except her first appearance.

She then played at the Pattaya Open, where she defeated Kurumi Nara, Kimiko Date-Krumm, and Akgul Amanmuradova, all in straight sets to reach the semifinals. There she upset top seed, world No. 3 and defending champion, Vera Zvonareva. Hantuchová then won her first title in more than three years by defeating Sara Errani in the final. Despite this, she fell to Anna Chakvetadze in the first round of the Dubai Championships the following week. However, she rebounded at the Qatar Ladies Open by upsetting sixth seed Victoria Azarenka in the first round, but fell in the quarterfinals to second seed and eventual champion Vera Zvonareva, despite serving for the match at 5–4 in the final set.

At the Indian Wells Open and the Miami Open, Hantuchová lost in the early rounds to Dinara Safina and top seed Caroline Wozniacki, respectively. Partnering Agnieszka Radwańska, she reached the semifinals in Indian Wells, falling to the eventual champions, but won the doubles title in Miami, defeating Nadia Petrova and Liezel Huber.

On clay, Hantuchová was upset in the third round of the Family Circle Cup in Charleston by Christina McHale. Hantuchová next competed on European red clay at the Porsche Tennis Grand Prix, the Madrid Open and the Italian Open. She fell in the early rounds of all three to Samantha Stosur in both Stuttgart and Madrid and to second seed Francesca Schiavone in Rome. However, Hantuchová rebounded at the Internationaux de Strasbourg, where she upset fourth seed Nadia Petrova in the quarterfinals, but fell to second seed Andrea Petkovic in the semifinals in three sets. Seeded 28th at the French Open, Hantuchová defeated Zhang Shuai and Sara Errani in the first two rounds, both in straight sets. She then upset top-ranked Caroline Wozniacki, 6–1, 6–3 for her first win over a reigning world No. 1. However, Hantuchová fell to 13th seed Svetlana Kuznetsova in the fourth round.

Hantuchová reached her second career grass-court final at the Birmingham Classic, upsetting second seed Ana Ivanovic in the semifinals, before falling to unseeded Sabine Lisicki. Competing at the Eastbourne International, Hantuchová defeated second seed Li Na and Venus Williams, before retiring to fifth seed Petra Kvitová in the semifinals. Seeded 25th at the Wimbledon, Hantuchová fell to fourth seed Victoria Azarenka in the third round.

Hantuchová fell in the early rounds of both the Bank of the West Classic and the Rogers Cup in Toronto. She reached her sixth and seventh quarterfinals of the season at the Carlsbad Open and at the Cincinnati Open, but fell to third seed Agnieszka Radwańska and second seed Vera Zvonareva, respectively. After a first-round loss at the US Open to Pauline Parmentier, Hantuchová reached the quarterfinals of the Bell Challenge and the Ladies Linz losing to Marina Erakovic and top seed Petra Kvitová, respectively. Hantuchová finished the year at world No. 24 with a win loss record of 41–29. She went 5–11 against the top ten, with victories over Zvonareva, Azarenka, Wozniacki, Li Na, and Bartoli.

=== 2012: Back-to-back Thailand Open championships and injuries ===
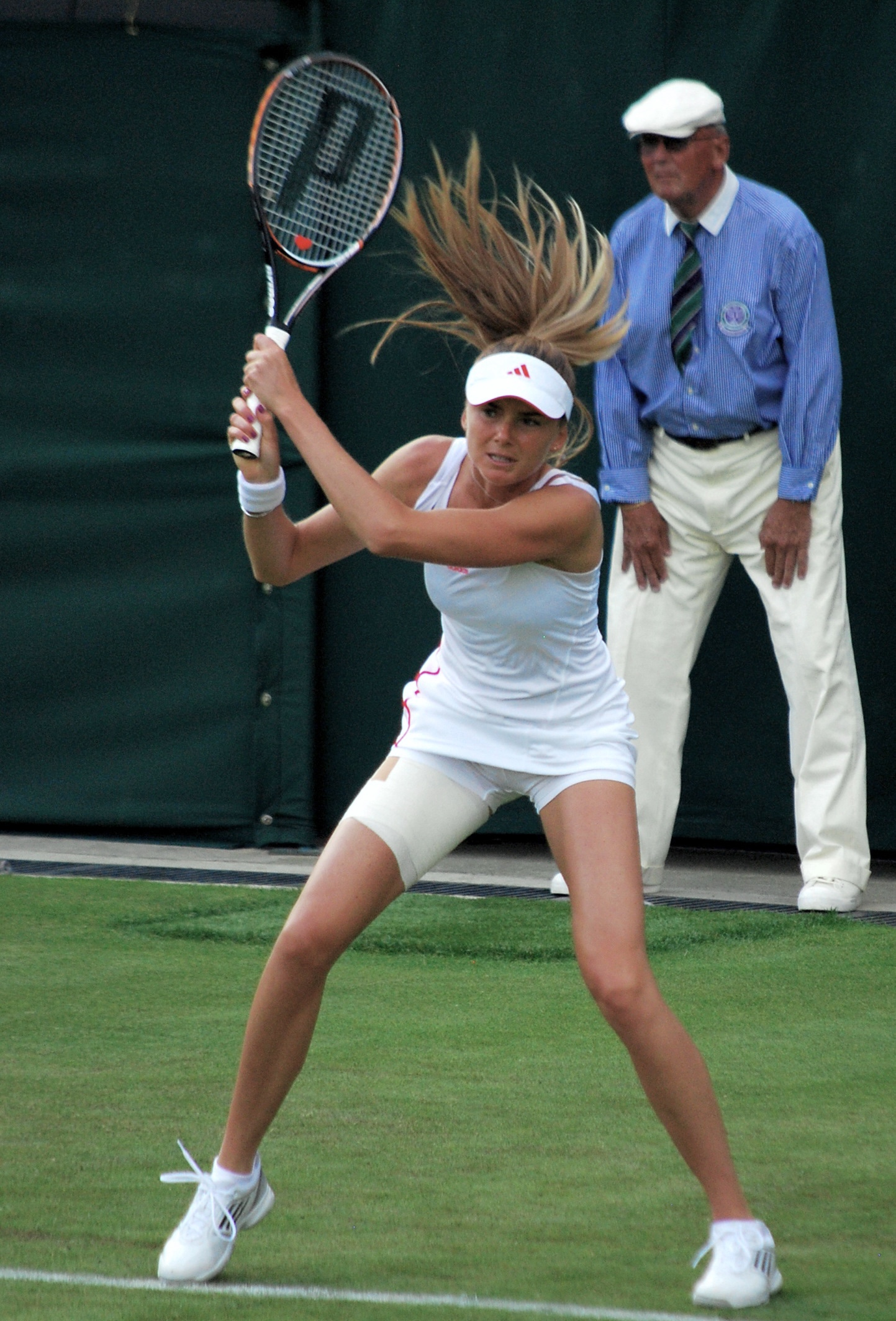
Hantuchová at 2012 Wimbledon Championships

Hantuchová began the year at the Brisbane International, where she reached her first final of the year, defeating Dominika Cibulková and Vania King, before receiving a walkover in the quarterfinals when Serena Williams pulled out of the event with an ankle sprain. In the semifinals, she lost the first set to Kim Clijsters, before the Belgian retired with a hip injury midway through the second. In the final, Hantuchová was easily defeated by Kaia Kanepi. In Sydney, Hantuchová upset Francesca Schiavone in the second round, before falling to second seed Petra Kvitová in the quarterfinals. Seeded No. 20 at the Australian Open, Hantuchová fell to eventual semifinalist and defending champion Clijsters, in straight sets in the third round.

At Pattaya, she successfully defended her title by defeating fourth seed Maria Kirilenko in the final. However, Hantuchová was upset in the first round of the Qatar Ladies Open in Doha the following week by Simona Halep. At the Dubai Championships, she fell in the quarterfinals to eventual finalist, Julia Görges.

Hantuchová then suffered relatively unsuccessful tournaments in Indian Wells and Miami. She fell in the second round after a bye to Czech Klára Zakopalová. In Miami, she defeated Kateryna Bondarenko in a third-set tiebreaker, before falling to Ana Ivanovic. At the Fed Cup against Spain, she lost to Sílvia Soler Espinosa, before defeating Lourdes Domínguez Lino to clinch the tie 3–2 for Slovakia.

During the match against Spain, Hantuchová suffered a stress fracture in her foot which laid her up for two months and forced her to miss the whole clay-court season.

Hantuchová lost her first-round match at Wimbledon 2012 against Jamie Hampton.

At the London Olympics, Hantuchová upset tenth seed Li Na in the first round. She then beat Frenchwoman Alizé Cornet in the second round. She faced eighth seed Caroline Wozniacki in the third round and lost.

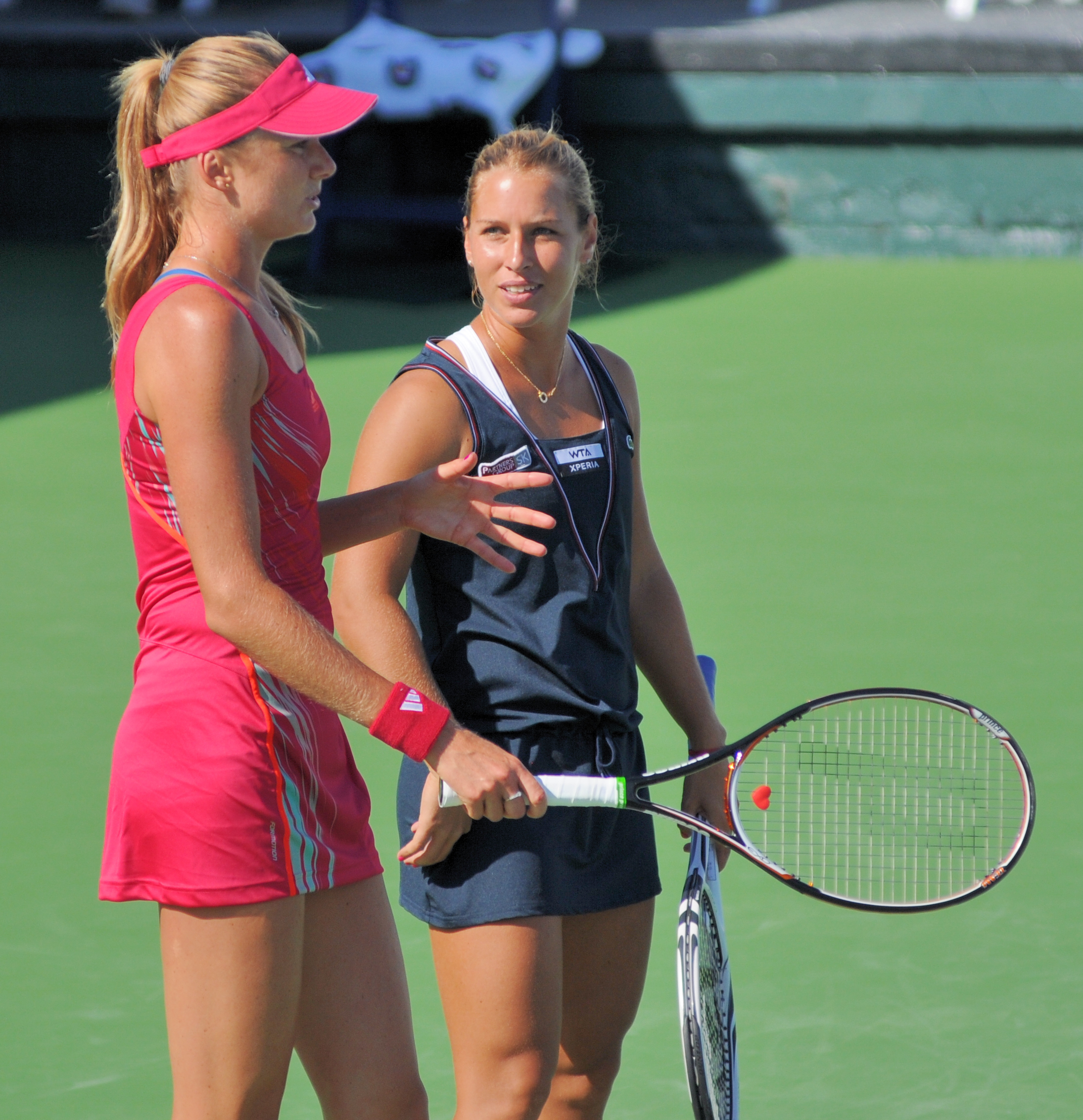
Hantuchová with doubles partner Dominika Cibulková at the Southern California Open in 2012

Hantuchová did not have the best US Open Series, winning only one match in four tournaments. At the Rogers Cup, she lost in two tough sets to Aleksandra Wozniak. At the Western & Southern Open, Hantuchová beat Zheng Jie in the first round, but lost to seventh seed Sara Errani in straight sets. Hantuchová lost in the first round of the New Haven Open to Mona Barthel. At the US Open, she lost to 17th seed Anastasia Pavlyuchenkova in straight sets.

At the Pan Pacific Open, Hantuchová beat Ekaterina Makarova in the first round, but then lost to tenth seed Caroline Wozniacki. Hantuchová lost in the first round of the China Open to seventh seed Petra Kvitová. She lost to fifth seed Julia Görges, in straight sets, at the Generali Ladies Linz. Hantuchová recorded her best result in months at the Luxembourg Open, where she made it to the semifinals. She lost to Monica Niculescu in straight sets. Hantuchová finished her year with three straight losses at the Tournament of Champions to Wozniacki, Roberta Vinci, and Hsieh Su-wei.

On reflection, Hantuchová said that 2012 was a difficult year for her. She struggled with niggling injuries even before she fractured her foot and was forced out for two months. As a result, her form was inconsistent and she suffered ten first-round defeats. She said: "I think 2012 has been a difficult year for me. Had a great start to the season, making the final in Brisbane, winning in Pattaya and feeling very good about my game, but unfortunately, suffered a fracture stress... that kept me away from the tracks for two months." However, she said that playing in the Olympics at Wimbledon, where she reached the third round, was a "special moment". In an interview at the end of the year, Hantuchová reflected on turning 30 the following April, saying that it was "just a number" and that she wanted to keep playing as long as possible and break back into the top 10.

=== 2013: Sixth career title, second US Open quarterfinal and return to the top 50 ===
Hantuchová started her year off in January with a quarterfinal appearance at the Brisbane International, beating Lourdes Domínguez Lino and fifth seed Sara Errani, before losing to Lesia Tsurenko. She then suffered two successive first-round defeats: at the Sydney International to Ayumi Morita and at the Australian Open to Chan Yung-jan. At the Pattaya Open at the end of the month, Hantuchová was the defending champion, but after beating Olga Puchkova in the first round, she had to retire during her second-round match against Nina Bratchikova.

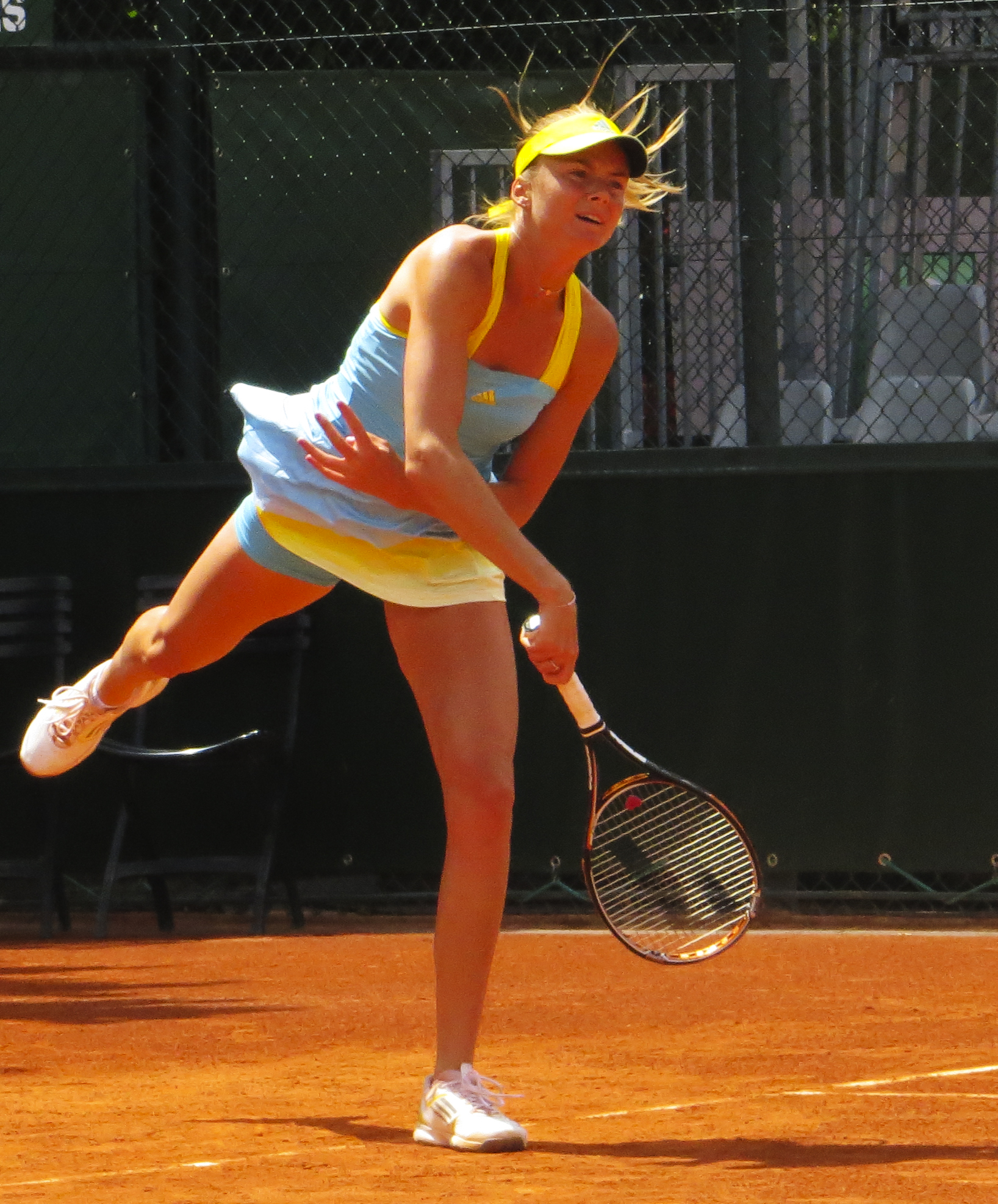
Daniela Hantuchová in 2013

Hantuchová's next two matches were first-round Fed Cup ties in February for Slovakia against Serbia. She won them both, beating Bojana Jovanovski and Vesna Dolonc in straight sets, helping her team progress to the quarterfinals. Hantuchová's next tournament was the Qatar Ladies Open, where she beat Laura Robson and Ekaterina Bychkova, losing in the third round to sixth seed Sara Errani. At the Dubai Tennis Championships, Hantuchová entered the qualifiers. She beat Karolína Plíšková, recorded a walkover against Simona Halep and beat Carla Suárez Navarro. In the first round of the main draw, she lost to sixth seed Petra Kvitová.

In March, Hantuchová reached the second round in back-to-back tournaments. First, the Indian Wells Open, beating Stéphanie Foretz Gacon and losing to top seed and defending champion Victoria Azarenka. Then, the Miami Open, beating Tsvetana Pironkova and losing to sixth seed Errani. At the Family Circle Cup in April, she lost in the first round to Marina Erakovic. In the Fed Cup semifinal against Russia, Hantuchová beat Maria Kirilenko, but lost in three sets to Ekaterina Makarova as Slovakia was defeated 3–2. At the Marrakech Grand Prix at the end of the month, she lost to Olga Puchkova.

At the Madrid Open in May, Hantuchová received a wild card and beat Sloane Stephens and eighth seed Kvitová, before losing to Kaia Kanepi in the third round. At the Italian Open, Hantuchová lost in the second qualifying round to Simona Halep. Hantuchová then suffered two first-round defeats, at the Internationaux de Strasbourg, where she was seeded eighth, to María Teresa Torró Flor, and then at the French Open, to Jelena Janković.

Hantuchová won her first tournament of 2013 in June at the Birmingham Classic. Unseeded for the tournament, she beat qualifier Casey Dellacqua in the first round. In the second, she beat seventh seed Laura Robson, securing her 500th career win and becoming only the 37th woman in the Open Era to do so. She then beat 12th seed Kristina Mladenovic, and in the quarterfinals 15th seed Francesca Schiavone. In the semifinals she defeated qualifier Alison Riske, and in the final Donna Vekić. Her first match after that was at the Rosmalen Grass Court Championships, where she received a wild card and retired in her first-round match against Lesia Tsurenko. At the Wimbledon Championships, she lost in the first round again, this time against Klára Zakopalová.

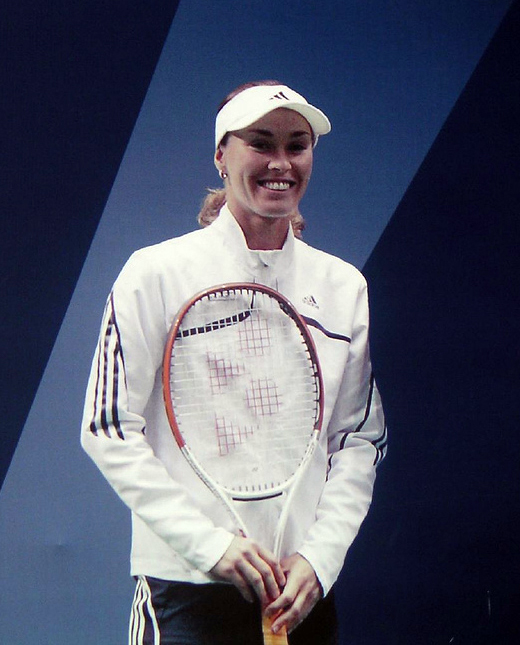
Beginning in August, Hantuchová began a doubles partnership with former world No. 1, Martina Hingis

Hantuchová began her US Open Series at the end of July at the Bank of the West Classic, winning in the first round against Yanina Wickmayer, but losing in the second round against seventh seed Urszula Radwańska. In doubles she and Lisa Raymond were seeded third. They reached the semifinals, where they lost to first seeds and eventual champions Raquel Kops-Jones and Abigail Spears. In the Southern California Open at the start of August, she defeated Tamira Paszek in the first round, and lost in the second round to second seed Agnieszka Radwańska. In the doubles she teamed up with Martina Hingis, for whom it was a comeback to the WTA tour. They reached the quarterfinals, again losing to the third seeds and eventual champions Kops-Jones and Spears. Hantuchová did not enter the singles of the Canadian Open, but she and Hingis did enter the doubles. They received a wild card, beating Kerber and Kvitová in the first round and losing to Julia Görges and Barbora Záhlavová-Strýcová in the second round. At the Cincinnati Open, Hantuchová received a wildcard, but lost in the first round to Andrea Petkovic. In doubles, she and Hingis reached the second round, losing to first seeds Errani and Roberta Vinci. At the New Haven Open, Hantuchová was defeated in the first round by eventual champion Simona Halep. In the doubles, Hantuchová and Hingis received a wildcard and were stopped in the first round by Cara Black and Vania King. At the US Open, Hantuchová beat Maria Sanchez in the first round, to advance beyond the first round of a major for the first time since the 2012 Australian Open. She then beat Victoria Duval in the second round and Israeli qualifier Julia Glushko in a tough match in the third round. Hantuchová was at one point down 3–6, 2–4 and faced four match points in the final set, but came back to win. She beat Alison Riske in the fourth round and advanced to the quarterfinals of the US Open for the first time since 2002 and for the first time at any Grand Slam since the 2008 Australian Open. She faced second seed Victoria Azarenka and lost. In doubles, Hantuchová and Hingis received a wildcard, but lost a re-match against top seeds Errani and Vinci.

=== 2014: Inconsistency ===
Hantuchová began the Australian Open Series in the first round of the Brisbane International, where she lost in an upset to Ashleigh Barty. In doubles, she and Sabine Lisicki lost to top-seeded Peschke and Srebotnik. Hantuchová, then lost in the first round of the Sydney International to wildcard entrant Ajla Tomljanović. She and Arantxa Parra Santonja beat Darija Jurak and Megan Moulton-Levy in the first round of the doubles, but lost to fourth seeds Raquel Kops-Jones and Abigail Spears in the second. At the 2014 Australian Open, she was seeded 31st and defeated Heather Watson in the first round and Karolína Plíšková in the second round. She lost to top seed Serena Williams in the third round. In the doubles, Hantuchová and Lisa Raymond were seeded 15th and beat Mandy Minella and Chanelle Scheepers in the first round and Magdaléna Rybáriková and Stefanie Vögele in the second round. They lost to third seeds Ekaterina Makarova and Elena Vesnina in the third round. In mixed doubles, Hantuchová and Leander Paes beat Ajla Tomljanović and James Duckworth in the first round and eighth seeds Elena Vesnina and Mahesh Bhupathi in the second round. They lost to Kristina Mladenovic and Daniel Nestor in the quarterfinals.

Hantuchová's next tournament was the Indoors in Paris. She defeated Marina Erakovic in the singles, but was beaten by top seed Maria Sharapova in round two. In doubles, she and Petra Kvitová lost to fellow wildcards Alizé Cornet and Caroline Garcia in the first round. She then played at the Qatar Ladies Open, where she had to withdraw during the second set of her first-round match with a right-knee injury.

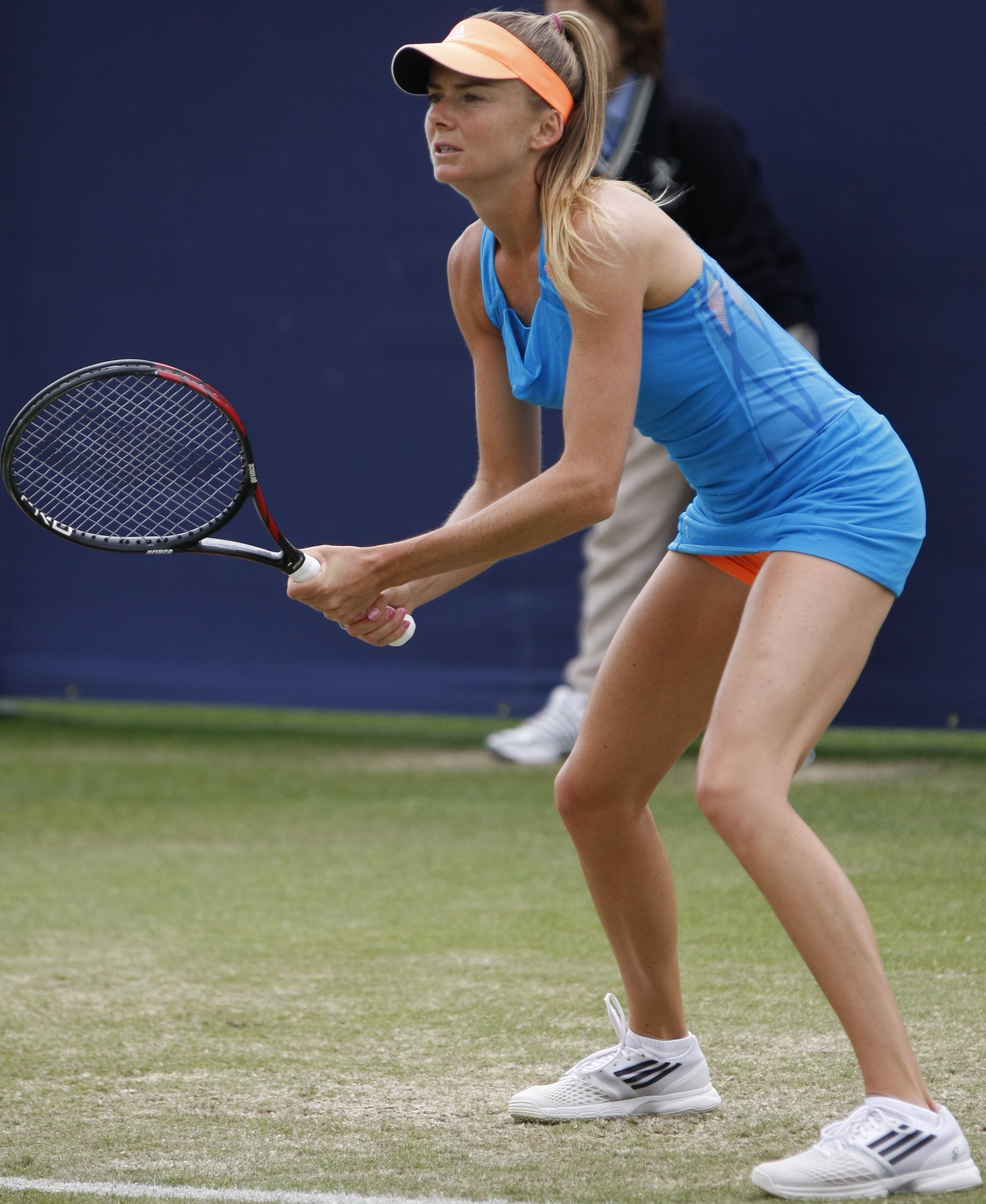
Hantuchová at the 2014 Aegon International

In March, Hantuchová hired Peter Lundgren, who coached Roger Federer from 2000 to 2003. She had previously been coached by Eduardo Nicolás from mid-2013 to the beginning of 2014.

Hantuchová lost both her openers at Indian Wells and Miami to Americans Varvara Lepchenko and Madison Keys, respectively. At the Charleston Cup where she was the 12th seed, she lost in the quarterfinals to fellow Slovak Jana Čepelová. Hantuchová then reached her first semifinal of the season at Marrakech as the top seed. There, she lost to Romina Oprandi. At the Madrid Open, she lost to Roberta Vinci in the first round. The following week, she lost in the first round again at Rome to Monica Puig.

During the grass-court season, Hantuchová played at Birmingham. She failed to defend her title when she lost to veteran Kimiko Date-Krumm in the third round after defeating rising star Belinda Bencic in her opener. The following week, she defeated Vinci in the first round at Eastbourne, but then lost to Lauren Davis. At Wimbledon, Hantuchová lost to eventual finalist Eugenie Bouchard in the first round.

Hantuchová played for the San Diego Aviators of World TeamTennis in July. She led the Aviators to the league's best regular-season record and was named WTT Female Most Valuable Player. The Aviators lost to the Springfield Lasers in the Western Conference Championship Match.

Hantuchová participated in the Bank of the West Classic, where she defeated Paula Ormaechea in round one, but lost to Garbiñe Muguruza in the second. In doubles, she and Arantxa Parra Santonja won the first round over Daria Gavrilova and Xu Yifan, but lost against Paula Kania and Kateřina Siniaková.

At the Canadian Open singles, she was defeated in first round by eventual finalist Caroline Wozniacki. She also lost the first doubles round alongside Arantxa Parra Santonja.

She went on to another first-round singles defeat at the Cincinnati Open at the hands of Ekaterina Makarova. In doubles, she partnered Barbora Záhlavová-Strýcová and won against Lucie Hradecká and Michaëlla Krajicek, but lost in round two against Errani and Vinci.

At the US Open, she defeated Romina Oprandi in round one, but lost to Alizé Cornet in the second round. She partnered Francesca Schiavone for women's doubles and lost to Ekaterina Makarova and Elena Vesnina in round one.

=== 2015: 7th WTA Tour title ===
Hantuchová started at the Auckland Open, where she beat Sara Errani in the first round in straight sets. This marked her first win against a top-20 player since May 2013. In the second round, Hantuchová lost to qualifier Urszula Radwańska. After Auckland, Hantuchová received a wildcard to play at the Hobart International. She beat qualifier Richèl Hogenkamp in the first round. In the second round, Hantuchová lost to third seed Zarina Diyas. At the Australian Open, Hantuchová beat Zheng Saisai in the first round, before she lost to 24th seed Garbiñe Muguruza. Hantuchová played her 17th singles final at the Thailand Open after wins over third seed Zarina Diyas, Zheng Saisai, Duan Yingying, and Marina Erakovic. She defeated Ajla Tomljanović in the final to win her seventh WTA tournament title. Two days later, at the Dubai Championships, she beat Mona Barthel in the first round. Hantuchová fell in the second round to top seed and eventual champion Simona Halep. At the Monterrey Open, Hantuchová was the seventh seed. She beat Monica Puig in the first round. However, she lost in the second round to qualifier Urszula Radwańska. Hantuchová lost in the first round of Indian Wells Open to Klára Koukalová. She also lost in the first round of the Miami Open to Belinda Bencic. Hantuchová won one match during Fed Cup by beating Susanne Celik of Sweden.

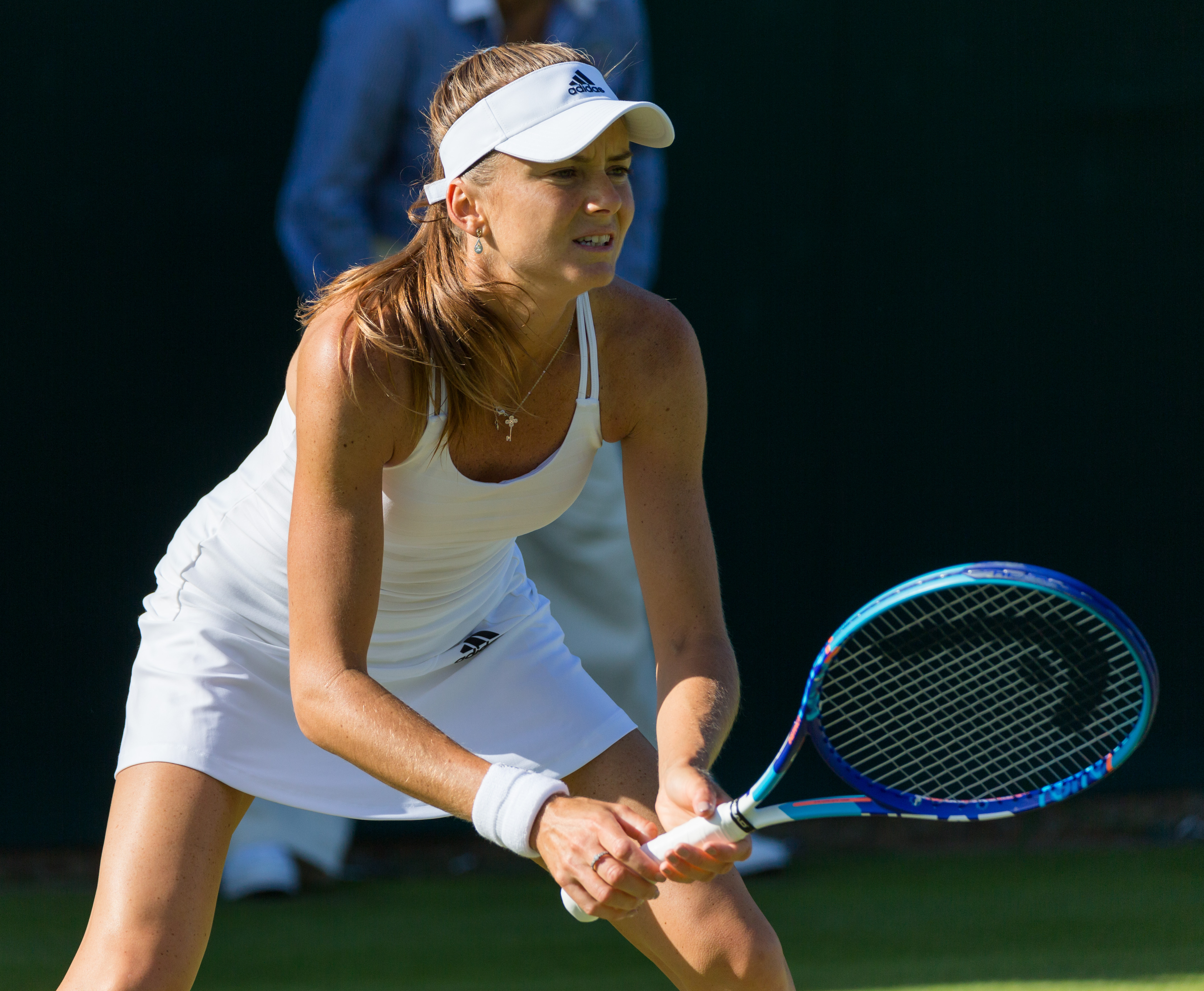
Hantuchová at the 2015 Wimbledon Championships

During the spring, Hantuchová switched her racquet brand from Prince to Head. At the Morocco Open, Hantuchová lost in the first round to Christina McHale. At the Madrid Open, Hantuchová lost in the first round to Elina Svitolina. Hantuchová lost again in the first round of the Internazionali d'Italia to 13th seed Sara Errani. Hantuchová lost in the first round of the French Open to Bencic. Hantuchová started her grass-court season by playing at the Nottingham Open, where she lost in the first round to Magda Linette in a three-setter. The following week, Hantuchová reached the quarterfinals at the Birmingham Classic with wins over 14th seed Irina-Camelia Begu, qualifier Marina Erakovic and qualifier Michelle Larcher de Brito, before she lost to eighth seed and grass-court specialist Sabine Lisicki. At Wimbledon, Hantuchová beat compatriot Dominika Cibulková in the first round. In the second round, she lost to British No. 1, Heather Watson. At the İstanbul Cup, she beat Turkish wildcard Çağla Büyükakçay. but in the second round, lost to eventual champion Lesia Tsurenko. At the Western & Southern Open, she lost in the first round to Kristina Mladenovic. At the US Open, Hantuchová lost in the first round to Misaki Doi. At the Guangzhou International Open, she lost in the first round to fifth seed Svetlana Kuznetsova. At the Wuhan Open, she was given a wild card into the main draw. In the first round, Hantuchová lost to 12th seed Elina Svitolina. Her final tournament of the year was at the China Open. She was the 14th seed for qualifying where in the first round, she lost to Lara Arruabarrena. Hantuchová finished 2015 ranked No. 81. This was her 15th straight top-100 season.

=== 2016: Out of the top 100 ===
Hantuchová started her season at the Brisbane International. She lost in the first round of qualifying to Ysaline Bonaventure. Getting through qualifying at the Sydney International, Hantuchová was supposed to face second seed Agnieszka Radwańska in the first round, but Radwańska withdrew due to a left leg injury. She got a bye into the second round, but fell to Samantha Stosur. At the Australian Open, Hantuchová was defeated in the first round by 23rd seed Svetlana Kuznetsova.

At the Qatar Ladies Open, she lost in the first round of qualifying to Anastasija Sevastova.

Having fallen out of the top 100 for the first time since March 2002, Hantuchová successfully made her way through qualifying at the French Open, defeating seventh seed Anna Tatishvili, Barbora Štefková and Jennifer Brady. She lost in the first round of the main draw to Mirjana Lučić-Baroni.

=== 2017: Out of Grand Slam tournaments and retirement ===
For the first time since 2000, Hantuchová had to play the qualifying round to enter the main draw at the Australian Open. She lost in the first round of qualifying to Natalia Vikhlyantseva.

During the Fed Cup tie versus Italy, Hantuchová played one rubber and defeated Sara Errani. In the end, Slovakia beat Italy 3–2. Playing a $25k tournament in Rancho Santa Fe, Hantuchová was defeated in the second round by Kayla Day. In Acapulco at the Mexican Open, Hantuchová lost in the second round to fourth seed Monica Puig. At Indian Wells, Hantuchová was defeated in the first round of qualifying by Mandy Minella. Seeded eighth for the ITF tournament in Santa Margherita di Pula ($25k), Hantuchová lost in the second round to Fiona Ferro.

On 6 July 2017, at Wimbledon, Hantuchová announced her retirement from professional tennis.

== Playing style ==
Hantuchová is right-handed but uses both hands when playing backhand shots. She can hit the ball hard with both her forehand and backhand but is best known as a player with natural timing and excellent technique. A "superb ball-striker", she plays a flowing style, hitting deep, accurate groundstrokes. Her double-handed backhand is a particularly potent weapon. She is often described as an "all-rounder". She has a strong, accurate serve and can play well when close to the net. She is famous for her long legs which are 43 in (110 cm) long. Thanks to her height (1.81m), Hantuchová can cover a long distance in a short amount of time, which also helps in returning shots. Although her speed across court has reduced a little in recent years, she compensates with her stamina. Dubbed the "Queen of 3-setters", as of 15 January 2014, Hantuchová had played 263 three-set matches, more than anyone else on the tour, winning 181 of them.

== Career statistics ==
=== Performance timelines ===
Key
W	F	SF	QF	#R	RR	Q#	DNQ	A	NH

(W) winner; (F) finalist; (SF) semifinalist; (QF) quarterfinalist; (#R) rounds 4, 3, 2, 1; (RR) round-robin stage; (Q#) qualification round; (DNQ) did not qualify; (A) absent; (NH) not held; (SR) strike rate (events won / competed); (W–L) win–loss record.

==== Grand Slam tournaments ====
Tournament	2000	2001	2002	2003	2004	2005	2006	2007	2008	2009	2010	2011	2012	2013	2014	2015	2016	2017	SR	W–L
Australian Open	Q2	1R	3R	QF	2R	3R	4R	4R	SF	3R	3R	1R	3R	1R	3R	2R	1R	Q1	0 / 16	29–16
French Open	A	2R	4R	2R	1R	3R	4R	3R	A	1R	4R	4R	A	1R	3R	1R	1R	A	0 / 14	20–14
Wimbledon	Q2	2R	QF	2R	3R	3R	4R	4R	2R	4R	2R	3R	1R	1R	1R	2R	1R	A	0 / 16	24–16
US Open	Q2	1R	QF	3R	3R	3R	2R	1R	1R	4R	3R	1R	1R	QF	2R	1R	A	A	0 / 15	21–15
Win–loss	0–0	2–4	13–4	8–4	5–4	8–4	10–4	8–4	6–3	8–4	8–4	5–4	2–3	4–4	5–4	2–4	0–3	0–0	0 / 61	94–61

==== Year-end championships ====
Tournament	2000	2001	2002	2003	2004	2005	2006	2007	2008	2009	2010	2011	2012	2013	2014	2015	2016	SR	W–L
WTA Finals	A	A	1R	Did not qualify				RR	Did not qualify									0 / 2	1–3
Tournament of Champions	Not Held									A	4th	1R	RR	A	A	Not Held		0 / 3	1–6
WTA Elite Trophy	Not Held															A	A	0 / 0	0–0

=== Grand Slam tournament finals ===
==== Doubles: 3 (3 runner-ups) ====
Result	Year	Championship	Surface	Partner	Opponents	Score
Loss	2002	Australian Open	Hard	(Spain) Arantxa Sánchez Vicario	(Switzerland) Martina Hingis (Russia) Anna Kournikova	2–6, 7–6^{(7–4)}, 1–6
Loss	2006	French Open	Clay	(Japan) Ai Sugiyama	(United States) Lisa Raymond (Australia) Samantha Stosur	3–6, 2–6
Loss	2009	Australian Open (2)	Hard	(Japan) Ai Sugiyama	(United States) Serena Williams (United States) Venus Williams	3–6, 3–6

==== Mixed doubles: 5 (4 titles, 1 runner-up) ====
By winning the 2005 US Open title, Hantuchová completed the mixed doubles Career Grand Slam. She became only the fifth female player in history to achieve this.

Result	Year	Championship	Surface	Partner	Opponents	Score
Win	2001	Wimbledon	Grass	(Czech Republic) Leoš Friedl	(United States) Mike Bryan (South Africa) Liezel Huber	4–6, 6–3, 6–2
Win	2002	Australian Open	Hard	(Zimbabwe) Kevin Ullyett	(Argentina) Gastón Etlis (Argentina) Paola Suárez	6–3, 6–2
Loss	2002	Wimbledon	Grass	(Zimbabwe) Kevin Ullyett	(Russia) Elena Likhovtseva (India) Mahesh Bhupathi	2–6, 6–1, 1–6
Win	2005	French Open	Clay	(France) Fabrice Santoro	(India) Leander Paes (United States) Martina Navratilova	3–6, 6–3, 6–2
Win	2005	US Open	Hard	(India) Mahesh Bhupathi	(Serbia and Montenegro) Nenad Zimonjić (Slovenia) Katarina Srebotnik	6–4, 6–2

== Endorsements ==
=== Product endorsement and equipment ===
Until the 2009 US Open, Hantuchová endorsed Nike sportswear and had her own line with them for her tournament wear, like players such as Maria Sharapova and Serena Williams. From the 2009 US Open onwards, Hantuchová began endorsing Adidas sportswear. As of Wimbledon 2010, she shares the same signature line as Ana Ivanovic. In 2006, Hantuchová also appeared on an advertisement for Sony Ericsson Cyber-shot phone with Ivanovic.

Hantuchová also has endorsed four racquet brands. She first endorsed Babolat from the time she was a junior until late 2003, then Yonex until the 2007 Pan Pacific Open in Tokyo, when she started using the Prince Ozone Seven at the 2007 Dubai Tennis Championships. Photos were released from Prince giving the impression that Hantuchová, from the start of the 2011 season, will be using the Prince EXO3 Tour Team 100. However, she signed a deal with Völkl Tennis and then used the Völkl Power Bridge 9. At the 2011 Fed Cup, she began using the Prince EXO3 Tour Team 100 again, with which she won her fourth career title. In 2014, she started using the Prince Warrior Pro 100. In spring of 2015, Hantuchová started using HEAD rackets and bags although the racket is not part of the current range and appears to be all black in color. During the 2015 grass court season, Hantuchová started using the HEAD Graphene Instinct MP racket. In 2016, Hantuchová switched her racquet brand back to Babolat.

=== Video games ===
Hantuchová has been in many sports/tennis related video games with such players as Maria Sharapova, Lindsay Davenport, Venus Williams and Anna Kournikova. Some of the titles are Top Spin (both Xbox and PlayStation 2 versions), Smash Court Tennis Pro Tournament 2, Roland Garros 2005 and Virtua Tennis 3. Hantuchová is also a playable character in Virtua Tennis 2009.

== Achievements ==
=== Team achievements ===
- 2000 Eurotel Doubles Champion
- 2002 Fed Cup Champion (Slovakia)
- 2004 Hopman Cup Finalist (with Karol Kučera)
- 2004 Athens Olympic Games
- 2005 Hopman Cup Champion (with Dominik Hrbatý)
- 2008 Beijing Olympic Games
- 2012 London Olympic Games

=== Awards ===
- 2001 WTA Newcomer of the Year Award
- 2002 WTA Most Improved Player of the Year Award
- 2003 Laureus World Sports Academy Award nominee for World Newcomer of the Year Award
- 2014 WTT Female Most Valuable Player
- 8 January 2019 Order of Ľudovít Štúr, 1st Class.

== See also ==
- Slovakia Fed Cup team

Awards
Preceded by (Czech Republic) Dája Bedáňová	WTA Newcomer of the Year; 2001	Succeeded by (Russia) Svetlana Kuznetsova
Preceded by (Belgium) Justine Henin-Hardenne	WTA Most Improved Player of the Year; 2002	Succeeded by (Russia) Nadia Petrova
