= Maria Kirilenko career statistics =

Career finals
Discipline	Type	Won	Lost	Total
Singles	Grand Slam	–	–	–
Singles	Summer Olympics	–	–	–
Singles	WTA Finals (Note: Formerly known as: Virginia Slims Championships (until 1995); WTA Tour Championships (until 2014))	–	–	–
Singles	WTA 1000 (Note: Formerly known as: Category 4 & 5 & 6 (until 1990); Tier I (until 2009); WTA Premier Mandatory and 5 (until 2021))	–	–	–
Singles	WTA 500 (Note: Formerly known as: Category 3 (until 1990); Tier II (until 2009); WTA Premier (until 2021))	1	2	3
Singles	WTA 250 (Note: Formerly known as: Category 1 & 2 (until 1990); Tier III & IV & V (until 2009); WTA International (until 2021))	5	4	9
Singles	Total	6	6	12
Doubles	Grand Slam	0	2	2
Doubles	Summer Olympics	–	–	–
Doubles	WTA Finals	1	0	1
Doubles	WTA 1000	3	4	7
Doubles	WTA 500	4	3	7
Doubles	WTA 250	4	4	8
Doubles	Total	12	13	25
Total		18	19	37

This is a list of the main career statistics of Russian professional tennis player Maria Kirilenko. She won six singles and 12 doubles titles on the WTA Tour. At the majors, in singles, she reached three different quarterfinals; the 2010 Australian Open, 2012 Wimbledon Championships and 2013 French Open, respectively. In doubles, she reached a couple of quarterfinals and semifinals, along with two finals (the 2011 Australian Open and 2012 French Open). On the WTA rankings, in both competition, she entered top 10. In singles, she has No. 10 as her career-highest and No. 5 in doubles.

She also left her mark at the national competitions for Russia, reaching semifinals of the 2012 Summer Olympics in London, but lost bronze medal match to Victoria Azarenka. However, in doubles, she won bronze medal alongside Nadia Petrova. At the Fed Cup, in 2011, with her Russian team, she reached final but lost to Czech Republic 2–3. Her biggest title in doubles is the 2012 WTA Tour Championships that she won alongside compatriot Petrova.

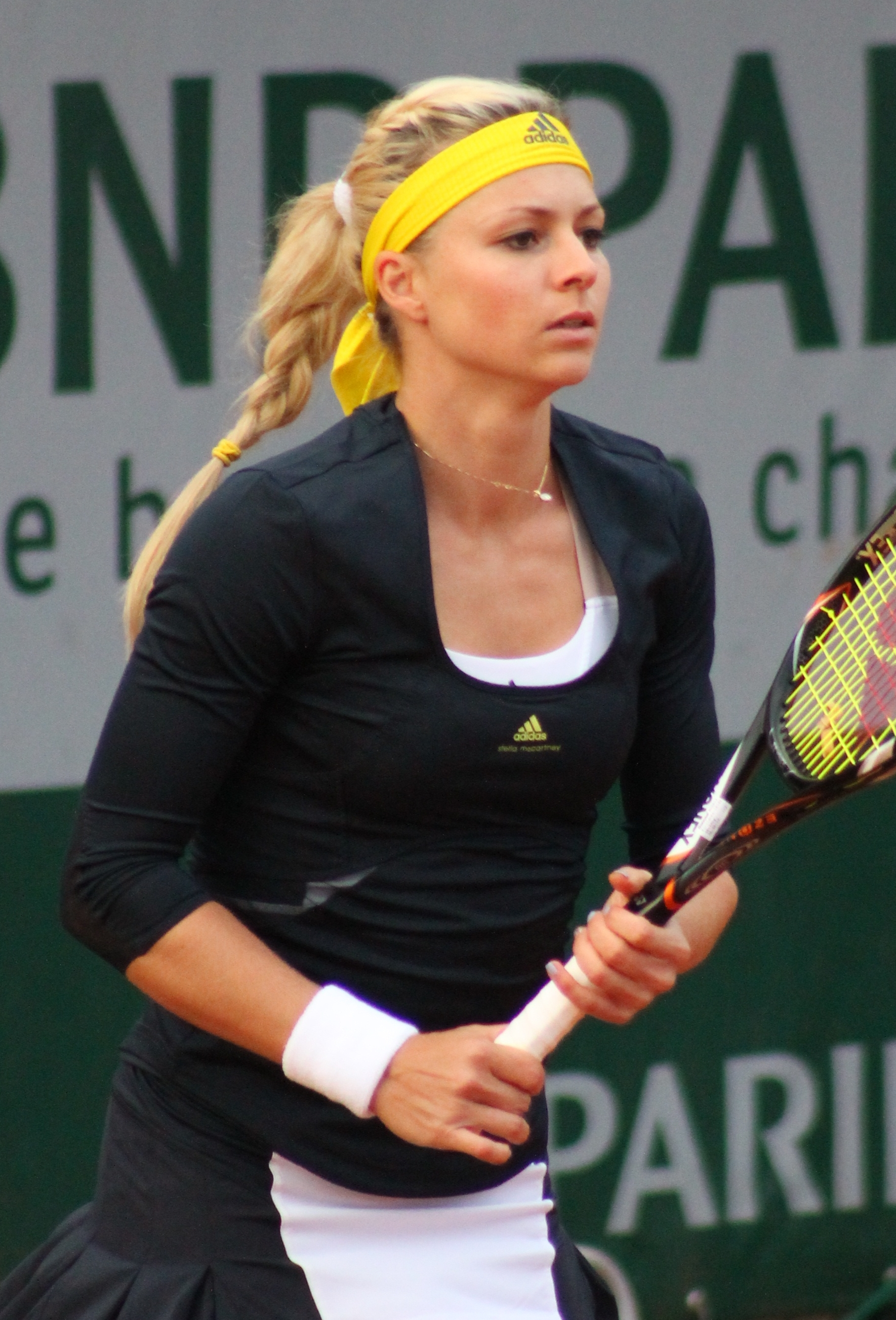
Kirilenko at the 2013 French Open.

== Performance timelines ==
Key
W	F	SF	QF	#R	RR	Q#	DNQ	A	NH

(W) winner; (F) finalist; (SF) semifinalist; (QF) quarterfinalist; (#R) rounds 4, 3, 2, 1; (RR) round-robin stage; (Q#) qualification round; (DNQ) did not qualify; (A) absent; (NH) not held; (SR) strike rate (events won / competed); (W–L) win–loss record.

Only main-draw results in WTA Tour, Grand Slam tournaments, Billie Jean King Cup (Fed Cup), Hopman Cup and Olympic Games are included in win–loss records.

=== Singles ===
Tournament	2002	2003	2004	2005	2006	2007	2008	2009	2010	2011	2012	2013	2014	SR	W–L	Win%
Grand Slam tournaments
Australian Open	A	A	Q1	2R	3R	3R	4R	1R	QF	2R	3R	4R	A	0 / 9	18–9	67%
French Open	A	A	2R	1R	3R	2R	2R	1R	4R	4R	2R	QF	1R	0 / 11	16–11	59%
Wimbledon	A	Q1	1R	2R	1R	1R	1R	2R	3R	3R	QF	1R	2R	0 / 11	11–11	50%
US Open	A	3R	2R	2R	3R	3R	1R	3R	3R	4R	3R	3R	1R	0 / 12	19–12	61%
Win–loss	0–0	2–1	2–3	3–4	6–4	5–4	4–4	3–4	11–4	9–4	9–4	9–4	1–3	0 / 43	64–43	60%
National representation
Summer Olympics	NH		A	NH			A	NH			4th	NH		0 / 1	4–2	67%
Year-end championships
WTA Finals	NH							A	A	A	RR	A	A	0 / 1	1–1	50%
WTA 1000 tournaments
Dubai / Qatar Open (Note: The first Premier 5 event of the year has switched back and forth between the Dubai Tennis Championships and the Qatar Ladies Open since 2009. Dubai was classified as a Premier 5 event from 2009 to 2011 before being succeeded by Doha for the 2012–2014 period. In 2015, Dubai regained its Premier 5 status while Doha was demoted to Premier status. The Premier 5 tournaments were reclassified as WTA 1000 tournaments in 2021.)	NMS						2R	1R	1R	1R	2R	1R	A	0 / 6	2–6	25%
Indian Wells Open	A	A	1R	4R	3R	3R	2R	1R	3R	3R	QF	SF	A	0 / 10	14–10	58%
Miami Open	A	A	2R	2R	4R	2R	2R	2R	3R	3R	4R	3R	A	0 / 10	10–10	50%
Madrid Open	NH							1R	1R	1R	2R	3R	2R	0 / 6	4–5	44%
Italian Open	A	Q2	A	1R	1R	1R	3R	A	QF	1R	1R	3R	1R	0 / 9	7–9	44%
Canadian Open	A	A	A	1R	2R	2R	2R	1R	2R	1R	A	2R	A	0 / 8	5–8	38%
Cincinnati Open	NH		NMS					2R	2R	2R	1R	2R	A	0 / 5	4–5	44%
Pan Pacific Open	A	A	A	2R	QF	2R	1R	A	2R	QF	A	A	A	0 / 6	8–6	57%
China Open	NMS							1R	3R	QF	1R	3R	1R	0 / 6	7–6	54%
Career statistics
	2002	2003	2004	2005	2006	2007	2008	2009	2010	2011	2012	2013	2014	SR	W–L	Win%
Tournaments	3	5	9	22	25	28	25	24	23	23	21	15	9	Career total: 223		
Titles	0	0	0	1	0	1	3	0	0	0	0	1	0	Career total: 6		
Finals	0	0	1	1	0	1	3	1	1	0	2	1	0	Career total: 11		
Overall win–loss	0–3	5–5	8–9	29–21	23–25	29–27	34–22	21–24	37–23	29–21	32–22	31–14	5–8	6 / 223	276–214	56%
Year-end ranking	417	122	111	25	30	25	29	63	20	28	14	19	190			

=== Doubles ===
Tournament	2001	2002	2003	2004	2005	2006	2007	2008	2009	2010	2011	2012	2013	SR	W–L	Win%
Grand Slam tournaments
Australian Open	A	A	A	A	1R	QF	3R	1R	3R	SF	F	3R	2R	0 / 9	19–8	70%
French Open	A	A	A	A	2R	3R	1R	2R	3R	QF	QF	F	A	0 / 8	17–8	68%
Wimbledon	A	A	A	A	A	1R	3R	2R	1R	2R	1R	2R	2R	0 / 8	6–8	43%
US Open	A	A	A	A	3R	3R	1R	1R	QF	3R	SF	QF	A	0 / 8	15–8	65%
Win-Loss	0–0	0–0	0–0	0–0	3–3	7–4	4–4	2–4	7–3	10–4	11–4	11–4	2-2	0 / 32	57–32	64%
Year-end championships
WTA Tour Championships	A	A	A	A	A	A	A	A	A	A	A	W	A	1 / 1	2–0	100%
National representation
Summer Olympics	NH			A	NH			A	NH			SF-B	NH	0 / 1	4–1	80%
WTA 1000 tournaments
Dubai / Qatar Open	NMS							1R	F	2R	SF	QF	A	0 / 5	8–5	62%
Indian Wells Open	A	A	A	2R	SF	1R	A	1R	SF	QF	SF	2R	A	0 / 8	13–7	65%
Miami Open	A	A	A	1R	QF	1R	1R	A	2R	QF	1R	W	A	1 / 8	10–7	59%
Madrid Open	NH								1R	QF	W	SF	A	1 / 4	9–3	75%
Italian Open	A	A	A	A	F	QF	A	QF	A	QF	1R	QF	A	0 / 6	11–6	65%
Canadian Open	A	A	A	A	2R	QF	1R	F	2R	2R	F	A	A	0 /7	12–6	67%
Cincinnati Open	NH			NMS					2R	W	QF	A	A	2 / 3	11–2	85%
Pan Pacific Open	A	A	A	A	A	SF	QF	QF	QF	1R	SF	A	A	0 / 6	15–6	71%
China Open	NMS								A	QF	2R	SF	A	0 / 2	2–3	40%
Career statistics
	2001	2002	2003	2004	2005	2006	2007	2008	2009	2010	2011	2012	2013	SR	W–L	Win%
Tournaments	0	1	3	7	20	20	21	19	20	18	17	15	2	Career total: 163		
Titles	0	0	0	1	1	0	1	2	1	2	2	2	0	Career total: 12		
Finals	0	0	0	1	3	1	1	4	4	2	4	5	0	Career total: 25		
Overall win–loss	0–0	0–1	2–3	6–6	28–16	22–20	17–19	26–15	33–18	34–15	34–12	37–13	2–2	12 / 163	241–140	63%
Year-end ranking			454	201	126	46	45	18	22	23	10	9	224			

== Grand Slam tournament finals ==
=== Doubles: 2 (runner-ups) ===
Result	Year	Championship	Surface	Partner	Opponents	Score
Loss	2011	Australian Open	Hard	(Belarus) Victoria Azarenka	(Argentina) Gisela Dulko; (Italy) Flavia Pennetta	6–2, 5–7, 1–6
Loss	2012	French Open	Clay	(Russia) Nadia Petrova	(Italy) Sara Errani; (Italy) Roberta Vinci	6–4, 4–6, 2–6

== Other significant finals ==
=== Olympic medal matches ===
==== Singles: 1 (loss) ====
Result	Year	Tournament	Surface	Opponent	Score
4th place	2012	London Olympics	Grass	(Belarus) Victoria Azarenka	3–6, 4–6

==== Doubles: 1 (win) ====
Result	Year	Tournament	Surface	Partner	Opponents	Score
Bronze	2012	London Olympics	Grass	(Russia) Nadia Petrova	(United States) Liezel Huber; (United States) Lisa Raymond	4–6, 6–4, 6–1

=== WTA Finals ===
==== Doubles: 1 (title) ====
Result	Year	Tournament	Surface	Partner	Opponents	Score
Win	2012	WTA Finals, Istanbul	Hard (i)	(Russia) Nadia Petrova	(Czech Republic) Andrea Hlaváčková; (Czech Republic) Lucie Hradecká	6–1, 6–4

=== WTA 1000 ===
==== Doubles: 7 (3 titles, 4 runner-ups) ====
Result	Year	Tournament	Surface	Partner	Opponents	Score
Loss	2005	Rome Masters	Clay	(Spain) Anabel Medina Garrigues	(Zimbabwe) Cara Black; (South Africa) Liezel Huber	0–6, 6–4, 1–6
Loss	2008	Canada Masters	Hard	(Italy) Flavia Pennetta	(Zimbabwe) Cara Black (United States) Liezel Huber	1–6, 1–6
Loss	2009	Dubai Championships	Hard	(Poland) Agnieszka Radwańska	(Zimbabwe) Cara Black (United States) Liezel Huber	3–6, 3–6
Win	2010	Cincinnati Masters	Hard	(Belarus) Victoria Azarenka	(United States) Lisa Raymond; (Australia) Rennae Stubbs	7–6^{(7–4)}, 7–6^{(10–8)}
Win	2011	Madrid Open	Clay	(Belarus) Victoria Azarenka	(Czech Republic) Květa Peschke; (Slovenia) Katarina Srebotnik	6–4, 6–3
Loss	2011	Canada Masters	Hard	(Belarus) Victoria Azarenka	(United States) Liezel Huber (United States) Lisa Raymond	w/o
Win	2012	Miami Masters	Hard	(Russia) Nadia Petrova	(Italy) Sara Errani (Italy) Roberta Vinci	7–6^{(7–0)}, 4–6, [10–4]

== WTA Tour finals ==
=== Singles: 12 (6 titles, 6 runner-ups) ===
Legend WTA 1000 (Premier Mandatory) WTA 500 (Tier II / Premier) (1–2) WTA 250 (Tier III / Tier IV / International) (5–4)	Finals by surface Hard (3–5) Clay (2–1) Carpet (1–0)

Result	W–L	Date	Tournament	Tier	Surface	Opponent	Score
Loss	0–1	Feb 2004	Hyderabad Open, India	Tier IV	Hard	(Australia) Nicole Pratt	6–7^{(3–7)}, 1–6
Win	1–1	Sep 2005	China Open	Tier II	Hard	(Germany) Anna-Lena Grönefeld	6–3, 6–4
Win	2–1	Sep 2007	Sunfeast Open, India	Tier III	Carpet (i)	(Ukraine) Mariya Koryttseva	6–0, 6–2
Loss	2–2	Sep 2007	Korea Open	Tier IV	Hard	(United States) Venus Williams	3–6, 6–1, 4–6
Win	3–2	Apr 2008	Estoril Open, Portugal	Tier IV	Clay	(Czech Republic) Iveta Benešová	6–4, 6–2
Win	4–2	Jun 2008	Barcelona Ladies Open, Spain	Tier IV	Clay	(Spain) María José Martínez Sánchez	6–0, 6–2
Win	5–2	Sep 2008	Korea Open	Tier IV	Hard	(Australia) Samantha Stosur	2–6, 6–1, 6–4
Loss	5–3	Apr 2009	Barcelona Ladies Open, Spain	Tier IV	Clay	(Italy) Roberta Vinci	0–6, 4–6
Loss	5–4	Oct 2010	Kremlin Cup, Russia	Premier	Hard (i)	(Belarus) Victoria Azarenka	3–6, 4–6
Loss	5–5	Feb 2012	Pattaya Women's Open, Thailand	International	Hard	(Slovakia) Daniela Hantuchová	7–6^{(7–4)}, 3–6, 3–6
Loss	5–6	Aug 2012	Connecticut Open, United States	Premier	Hard	(Czech Republic) Petra Kvitová	6–7^{(9–11)}, 5–7
Win	6–6	Feb 2013	Pattaya Women's Open, Thailand	International	Hard	(Germany) Sabine Lisicki	5–7, 6–1, 7–6^{(7–1)}

=== Doubles: 25 (12 titles, 13 runner-ups) ===
Legend Grand Slam tournaments (0–2) Finals (1–0) WTA 1000 (Tier I / Premier 5 / Premier M) (3–4) WTA 500 (Tier II / Premier) (4–3) WTA 250 (Tier III / Tier IV / International) (4–4)	Finals by surface Hard (9–9) Grass (1–1) Clay (2–3)

Result	W–L	Date	Tournament	Tier	Surface	Partner	Opponents	Score
Win	1–0	Jun 2004	Birmingham Classic, United Kingdom	Tier III	Grass	(Russia) Maria Sharapova	(Australia) Lisa McShea; (Venezuela) Milagros Sequera	6–2, 6–1
Loss	1–1	May 2005	Italian Open	Tier I	Clay	(Spain) Anabel Medina Garrigues	(Zimbabwe) Cara Black; (South Africa) Liezel Huber	0–6, 6–4, 1–6
Loss	1–2	Aug 2005	Connecticut Open, United States	Tier II	Hard	(Argentina) Gisela Dulko	(United States) Lisa Raymond; (Australia) Samantha Stosur	2–6, 7–6^{(8–6)}, 1–6
Win	2–2	Oct 2005	Japan Open	Tier III	Hard	(Argentina) Gisela Dulko	(Japan) Shinobu Asagoe; (Venezuela) María Vento-Kabchi	7–5, 4–6, 6–3
Loss	2–3	Jun 2006	Rosmalen Open, Netherlands	Tier III	Grass	(Serbia) Ana Ivanovic	(China) Yan Zi; (China) Zheng Jie	6–3, 2–6, 2–6
Win	3–3	Feb 2007	Qatar Ladies Open	Tier II	Hard	(Switzerland) Martina Hingis	(Hungary) Ágnes Szávay; (Czech Republic) Vladimíra Uhlířová	6–1, 6–1
Win	4–3	Apr 2008	Portugal Open	Tier IV	Clay	(Italy) Flavia Pennetta	(Bosnia and Herzegovina) Mervana Jugić-Salkić (Turkey) İpek Şenoğlu	6–4, 6–4
Loss	4–4	Aug 2008	Canadian Open	Tier I	Hard	(Italy) Flavia Pennetta	(Zimbabwe) Cara Black (United States) Liezel Huber	1–6, 1–6
Win	5–4	Aug 2008	Cincinnati Open, United States	Tier III	Hard	(Russia) Nadia Petrova	(Chinese Taipei) Hsieh Su-wei; (Russia) Yaroslava Shvedova	6–3, 4–6, [10–8]
Loss	5–5	Sep 2008	Korea Open	Tier IV	Hard	(Russia) Vera Dushevina	(Chinese Taipei) Chuang Chia-jung (Chinese Taipei) Hsieh Su-wei	3–6, 0–6
Loss	5–6	Feb 2009	Dubai Open, UAE	Premier 5	Hard	(Poland) Agnieszka Radwańska	(Zimbabwe) Cara Black (United States) Liezel Huber	3–6, 3–6
Loss	5–7	Apr 2009	Morocco Open	International	Clay	(Romania) Sorana Cîrstea	(Russia) Alisa Kleybanova; (Russia) Ekaterina Makarova	3–6, 6–2, [8–10]
Loss	5–8	Aug 2009	Los Angeles Open, United States	Premier	Hard	(Poland) Agnieszka Radwańska	(Chinese Taipei) Chuang Chia-jung (China) Yan Zi	0–6, 6–4, [7–10]
Win	6–8	Oct 2009	Kremlin Cup, Russia	Premier	Hard (i)	(Russia) Nadia Petrova	(Russia) Maria Kondratieva (Czech Republic) Klára Zakopalová	6–2, 6–2
Win	7–8	Aug 2010	Southern California Open, United States	Premier	Hard	(China) Zheng Jie	(United States) Lisa Raymond (Australia) Rennae Stubbs	6–4, 6–4
Win	8–8	Aug 2010	Cincinnati Open, United States	Premier 5	Hard	(Belarus) Victoria Azarenka	(United States) Lisa Raymond (Australia) Rennae Stubbs	7–6^{(7–4)}, 7–6^{(10–8)}
Loss	8–9	Jan 2011	Australian Open	Grand Slam	Hard	(Belarus) Victoria Azarenka	(Argentina) Gisela Dulko (Italy) Flavia Pennetta	6–2, 5–7, 1–6
Win	9–9	Apr 2011	Madrid Open, Spain	Premier M	Clay	(Belarus) Victoria Azarenka	(Czech Republic) Květa Peschke (Slovenia) Katarina Srebotnik	6–4, 6–3
Win	10–9	Jul 2011	Silicon Valley Classic, United States	Premier	Hard	(Belarus) Victoria Azarenka	(United States) Liezel Huber (United States) Lisa Raymond	6–1, 6–3
Loss	10–10	Aug 2011	Canadian Open	Premier 5	Hard	(Belarus) Victoria Azarenka	(United States) Liezel Huber (United States) Lisa Raymond	Walkover
Win	11–10	Mar 2012	Miami Open, United States	Premier M	Hard	(Russia) Nadia Petrova	(Italy) Sara Errani (Italy) Roberta Vinci	7–6^{(7–0)}, 4–6, [10–4]
Loss	11–11	May 2012	French Open	Grand Slam	Clay	(Russia) Nadia Petrova	(Italy) Sara Errani (Italy) Roberta Vinci	6–4, 4–6, 2–6
Loss	11–12	Jun 2012	Rosmalen Open, Netherlands	International	Grass	(Russia) Nadia Petrova	(Italy) Sara Errani (Italy) Roberta Vinci	4–6, 6–3, [9–11]
Loss	11–13	Oct 2012	Kremlin Cup, Russia	Premier	Hard (i)	(Russia) Nadia Petrova	(Russia) Ekaterina Makarova (Russia) Elena Vesnina	3–6, 6–1, [8–10]
Win	12–13	Oct 2012	WTA Finals, Turkey	Finals	Hard (i)	(Russia) Nadia Petrova	(Czech Republic) Andrea Hlaváčková (Czech Republic) Lucie Hradecká	6–1, 6–4

== WTA Tour career earnings ==
Year	Grand Slam titles (Note: Includes singles, doubles and mixed doubles titles.)	WTA titles	Total titles	Earnings ($)	Money list rank
2003	0	0	0	55,550	155
2004	0	1	1	107,444	112
2005	0	2	2	382,559	35
2006	0	0	0	431,467	31
2007	0	2	2	451,756	34
2008	0	5	5	455,770	39
2009	0	1	1	444,704	50
2010	0	2	2	912,925	21
2011	0	2	2	1,001,417	16
2012	0	2	2	1,327,054	14
2013	0	1	1	995,357	20
2014*	0	0	0	230,216	100+
Career*	0	18	18	6,526,615	43

*As of Feb 28, 2013

== Fed Cup participations ==
=== Singles (5) ===
Edition	Round	Date	Venue	Against	Surface	Opponent	W/L	Result
2006	WG QF	Apr 2006	Liège (BEL)	Belgium	Clay	Kim Clijsters	L	1–6, 4–6
2011	WG F	Nov 2011	Moscow (RUS)	Czech Republic	Hard	Petra Kvitová	L	2–6, 2–6
2013	WG 1R	Feb 2013	Moscow (RUS)	Japan	Hard	Kimiko Date-Krumm	W	7–6^{(7–3)}, 6–3
2013	WG SF	Apr 2013	Moscow (RUS)	Slovakia	Clay	Daniela Hantuchová	L	2–6, 4–6
2013	WG SF	Apr 2013	Moscow (RUS)	Slovakia	Clay	Dominika Cibulková	W	7–5, 6–1

=== Doubles (2) ===
Edition	Round	Date	Venue	Partnering	Against	Surface	Opponents	W/L	Result
2006	WG QF	Apr 2006	Liège (BEL)	Dinara Safina	Belgium	Clay	Kim Clijsters; Justine Henin-Hardenne	W	7–6^{(7–4)}, 7–5
2011	WG F	Nov 2011	Moscow (RUS)	Elena Vesnina	Czech Republic	Hard	Lucie Hradecká; Květa Peschke	L	4–6, 2–6

== Record against other players ==
=== No. 1 wins ===
#	Player	Event	Surface	Rd	Score	Result
1.	(Russia) Maria Sharapova	2005 China Open	Hard	SF	6–4, 2–1, ret.	W

=== Top 10 wins ===
Season	2005	2006	2007	2008	2009	2010	2011	2012	2013	Total
Wins	1	0	1	1	1	3	2	2	2	13

#	Player	vsRank	Event	Surface	Round	Score	MRK
2005
1.	(Russia) Maria Sharapova	1	China Open	Hard	SF	6–4, 2–1, ret.	45
2007
2.	(Serbia) Jelena Janković	3	San Diego Open, US	Hard	3R	6–2, 3–6, 7–5	42
2008
3.	(Russia) Anna Chakvetadze	6	Australian Open	Hard	3R	6–7^{(6–8)}, 6–1, 6–2	26
2009
4.	(Poland) Agnieszka Radwańska	10	Kremlin Cup, Russia	Hard (i)	1R	6–3, 6–3	61
2010
5.	(Russia) Dinara Safina	2	Australian Open	Hard	4R	5–4, ret.	58
6.	(Russia) Svetlana Kuznetsova	5	Italian Open	Clay	2R	6–2, 3–6, 6–4	37
7.	(Russia) Svetlana Kuznetsova	6	French Open	Clay	3R	6–3, 2–6, 6–4	30
2011
8.	(Australia) Samantha Stosur	7	Pan Pacific Open, Japan	Hard	2R	6–2, 4–6, 6–4	27
9.	(Australia) Samantha Stosur	7	China Open	Hard	2R	7–5, 1–6, 7–5	24
2012
10.	(Czech Republic) Petra Kvitová	6	London Olympics	Grass	QF	7–6^{(7–3)}, 6–3	15
11.	(Denmark) Caroline Wozniacki	8	Connecticut Open, US	Hard	SF	7–5, ret.	14
2013
12.	(Poland) Agnieszka Radwańska	4	Indian Wells Open, US	Hard	4R	6–1, 4–6, 7–5	15
13.	(Czech Republic) Petra Kvitová	7	Indian Wells Open, US	Hard	QF	4–6, 6–4, 6–3	15
