= 2009 Hansol Korea Open – Singles =

Singles
- 2009 Hansol Korea Open

Final
- Champion: (Japan) Kimiko Date-Krumm
- Runner-up: (Spain) Anabel Medina Garrigues
- Score: 6–3, 6–3

Details
- Draw: 32
- Seeds: 8

Events
Singles	Doubles
← 2008 ·	Korea Open	· 2010 →

Maria Kirilenko was the defending champion but lost in the semifinals against Kimiko Date-Krumm.
Kimiko Date-Krumm won in the final 6–3, 6–3 against Anabel Medina Garrigues.

== Seeds ==
1. (Slovakia) Daniela Hantuchová (quarterfinals)
2. (Spain) Anabel Medina Garrigues (final)
3. (Italy) Francesca Schiavone (second round, retired)
4. (Romania) Sorana Cîrstea (first round)
5. (Russia) Alisa Kleybanova (second round)
6. (Russia) Anastasia Pavlyuchenkova (second round)
7. (Russia) Vera Dushevina (quarterfinals)
8. (Austria) Sybille Bammer (second round)

== Draw ==
=== Key ===
- Q = Qualifier
- WC = Wild card
- LL = Lucky loser
- Alt = Alternate
- SE = Special exempt
- PR = Protected ranking
- ITF = ITF entry
- JE = Junior exempt
- w/o = Walkover
- r = Retired
- d = Defaulted
- SR = Special ranking

=== Finals ===
Semifinals
(Japan) Kimiko Date-Krumm	3	6	6
(Russia) Maria Kirilenko	6	2	4
(Germany) Anna-Lena Grönefeld	6	3	1
2	(Spain) Anabel Medina Garrigues	2	6	6

Final
(Japan) Kimiko Date-Krumm	6	6
2	(Spain) Anabel Medina Garrigues	3	3

=== Top half ===
First round
1	(Slovakia) D Hantuchová	6	4	6
(Japan) A Morita	4	6	2
WC	(South Korea) S-J Kim	1	3
(South Africa) C Scheepers	6	6
(Japan) K Date-Krumm	6	6
WC	(South Korea) Y-R Lee	3	4
(Slovenia) K Srebotnik	2	3
5	(Russia) A Kleybanova	6	6
3	(Italy) F Schiavone	6	6
Q	(Japan) Y Sema	1	4
(Russia) M Kirilenko	4	6	6
Q	(Australia) S Ferguson	6	1	2
(Latvia) A Sevastova	6	7
(France) M Johansson	2	5
(Poland) U Radwańska	3	1
7	(Russia) V Dushevina	6	6

Second round
1	(Slovakia) D Hantuchová	6	6
(South Africa) C Scheepers	1	1
(Japan) K Date-Krumm	4	7	6
5	(Russia) A Kleybanova	6	6^{4}	3
3	(Italy) F Schiavone	1	2	r
(Russia) M Kirilenko	6	1
(Latvia) A Sevastova	5	1
7	(Russia) V Dushevina	7	6

Quarterfinals
1	(Slovakia) D Hantuchová	6^{3}	6	4
(Japan) K Date-Krumm	7	4	6
(Russia) M Kirilenko	7	7
7	(Russia) V Dushevina	5	6^{5}

Semifinals
(Japan) K Date-Krumm	3	6	6
(Russia) M Kirilenko	6	2	4

=== Bottom half ===
First round
6	(Russia) A Pavlyuchenkova	7	6
(United States) A Haynes	6^{5}	2
Q	(Japan) J Namigata	3	3
(Chinese Taipei) Y-j Chan	6	6
(Ukraine) V Kutuzova	4	3
Q	(Chinese Taipei) K-C Chang	6	6
(Germany) A-L Grönefeld	7	3	6
4	(Romania) S Cîrstea	6^{3}	6	3
8	(Austria) S Bammer	2	6	6
(Russia) E Makarova	6	4	4
(Slovakia) M Rybáriková	6	6
(Italy) A Brianti	2	2
WC	(South Korea) M Yoo	0	3
(United States) M Shaughnessy	6	6
(Germany) A Petkovic	3	4
2	(Spain) A Medina Garrigues	6	6

Second round
6	(Russia) A Pavlyuchenkova	6	4	1
(Chinese Taipei) Y-j Chan	2	6	6
Q	(Chinese Taipei) K-C Chang	7	4	3
(Germany) A-L Grönefeld	6^{5}	6	6
8	(Austria) S Bammer	1	5
(Slovakia) M Rybáriková	6	7
(United States) M Shaughnessy	3	1
2	(Spain) A Medina Garrigues	6	6

Quarterfinals
(Chinese Taipei) Y-j Chan	0	6	5
(Germany) A-L Grönefeld	6	2	7
(Slovakia) M Rybáriková	3	3
2	(Spain) A Medina Garrigues	6	6

Semifinals
(Germany) A-L Grönefeld	6	3	1
2	(Spain) A Medina Garrigues	2	6	6
