= 2008 Hansol Korea Open =

- Date: 22–28 September
- Edition: 5th
- Category: Tier IV Series
- Draw: 32S / 16D
- Prize money: $145,000
- Surface: Hard / outdoor
- Location: Seoul, South Korea
- Venue: Seoul Olympic Park Tennis Center

Champions

Singles
- (Russia) Maria Kirilenko

Doubles
- (Chinese Taipei) Chuang Chia-jung / (Chinese Taipei) Hsieh Su-wei
← 2007 ·	Korea Open	· 2009 →

The 2008 Hansol Korea Open was a women's tennis tournament played on outdoor hard courts. It was the fifth edition of the event known that year as the Hansol Korea Open, and was part of the Tier IV Series of the 2008 WTA Tour. It took place at the Seoul Olympic Park Tennis Center in Seoul, South Korea, from 22 September through 28 September 2008. First-seeded Maria Kirilenko won the singles title.

== Finals ==
=== Singles ===
(Russia) Maria Kirilenko defeated (Australia) Samantha Stosur, 2–6, 6–1, 6–4

- It was Kirilenko's 3rd and last singles title of the year and the 5th of her career.

=== Doubles ===
(Chinese Taipei) Chuang Chia-jung / (Chinese Taipei) Hsieh Su-wei defeated (Russia) Vera Dushevina / (Russia) Maria Kirilenko, 6–3, 6–0
