= Yebisu Garden Place =

- 恵比寿ガーデンプレイス
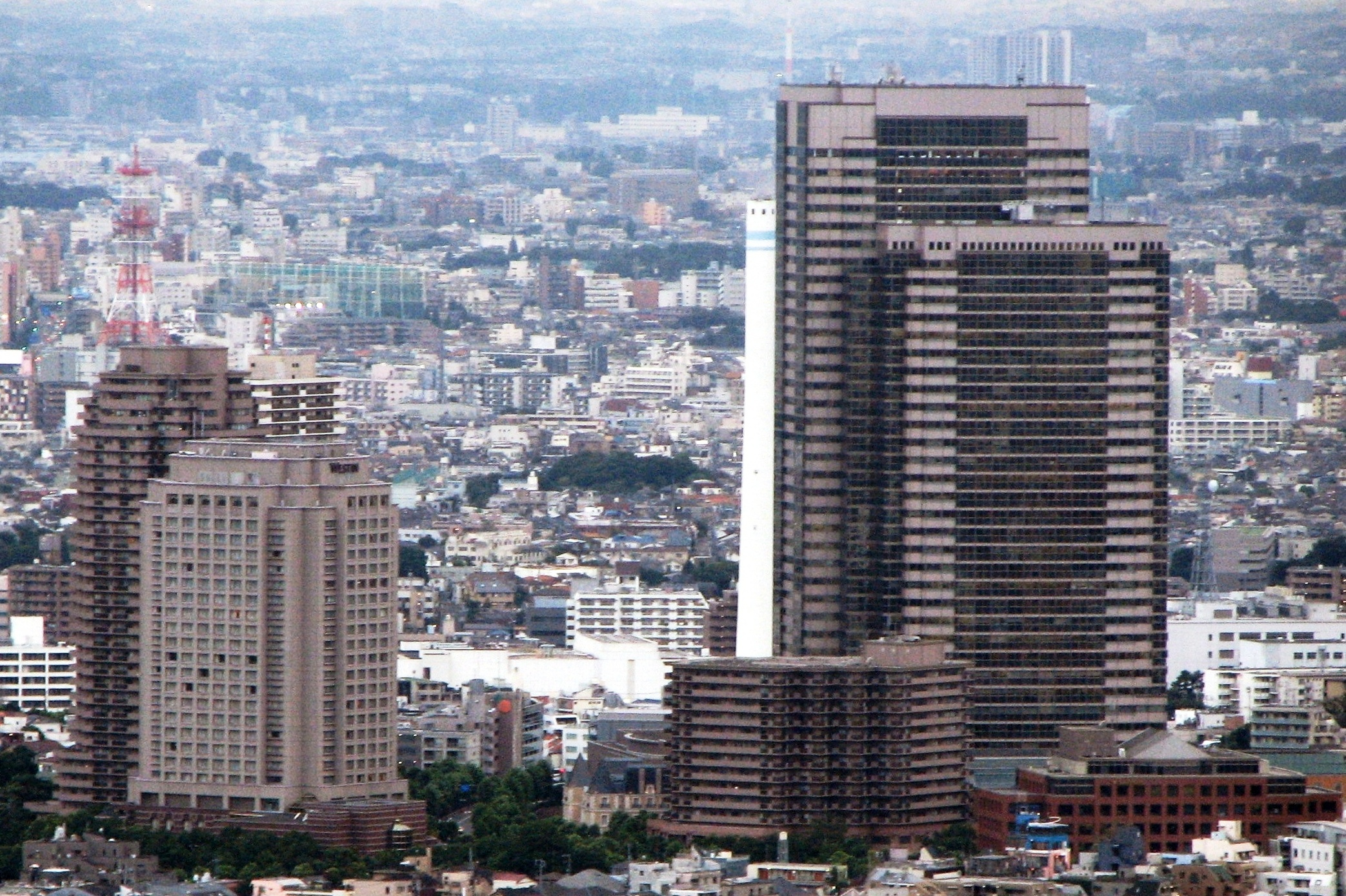
- Interactive map of the Yebisu Garden Place area

General information
- Location: Ebisu, Shibuya / Mita, Meguro, Tokyo, Japan
- Coordinates: 35°38′32″N 139°42′51″E
- Opened: October 8, 1994

Technical details
- Floor area: 476,125.62 m2

Design and construction
- Developer: Sapporo Breweries

Website
- https://gardenplace.jp https://www.sapporo-re.jp/portfolio/ygp/

Yebisu Garden Place (Japanese: 恵比寿ガーデンプレイス) is a large mixed-use commercial, cultural, and residential complex located in the Ebisu area of Shibuya and the Mita area of Meguro, Tokyo, Japan.

The complex opened in 1994 as a major urban redevelopment project on the former site of the Sapporo Breweries Ebisu factory and was developed by Sapporo Breweries.

It is widely regarded as one of a large-scale redevelopment project in Tokyo of the late 20th century, integrating office space, commercial facilities, cultural institutions, a luxury hotel, and public open spaces within a single urban complex.

== Overview ==
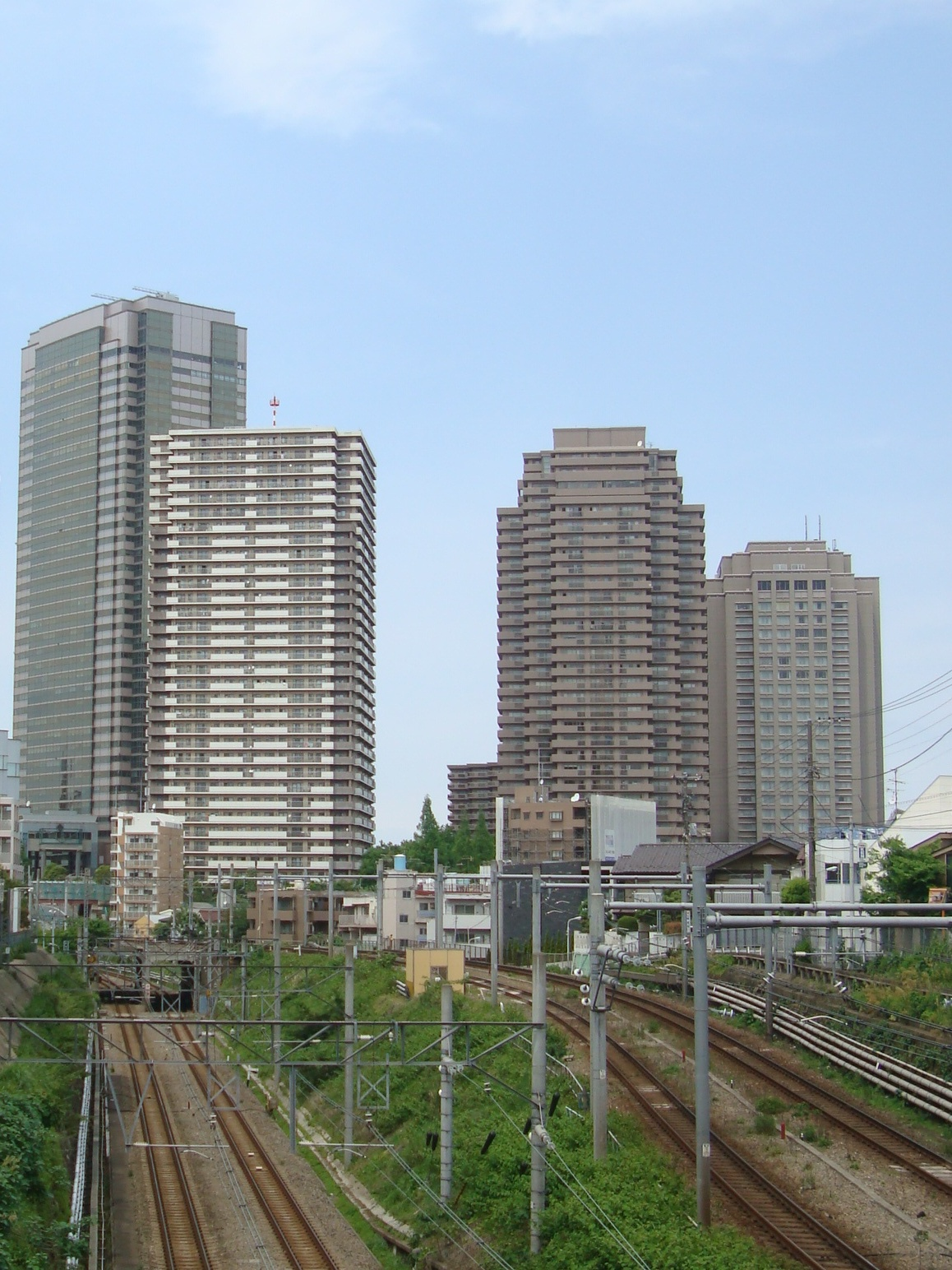
Yebisu Garden Place

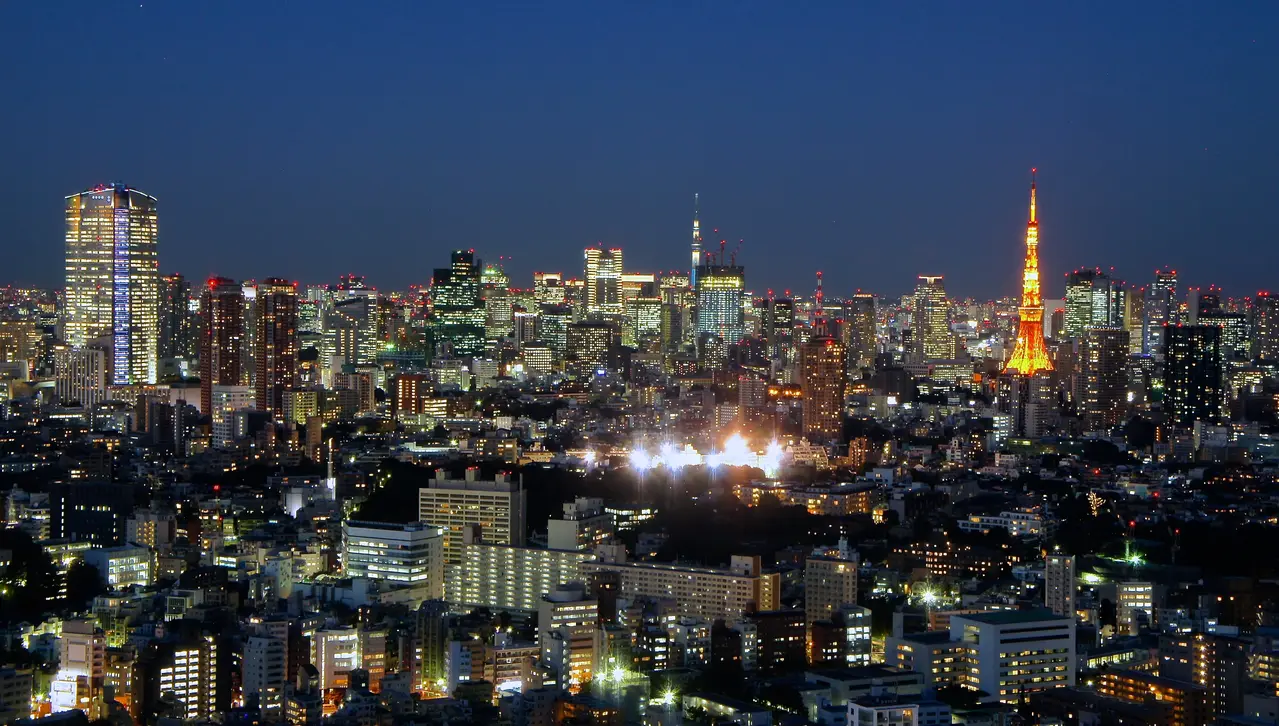
Tokyo Tower and Tokyo Skytree from Yebisu Garden Place

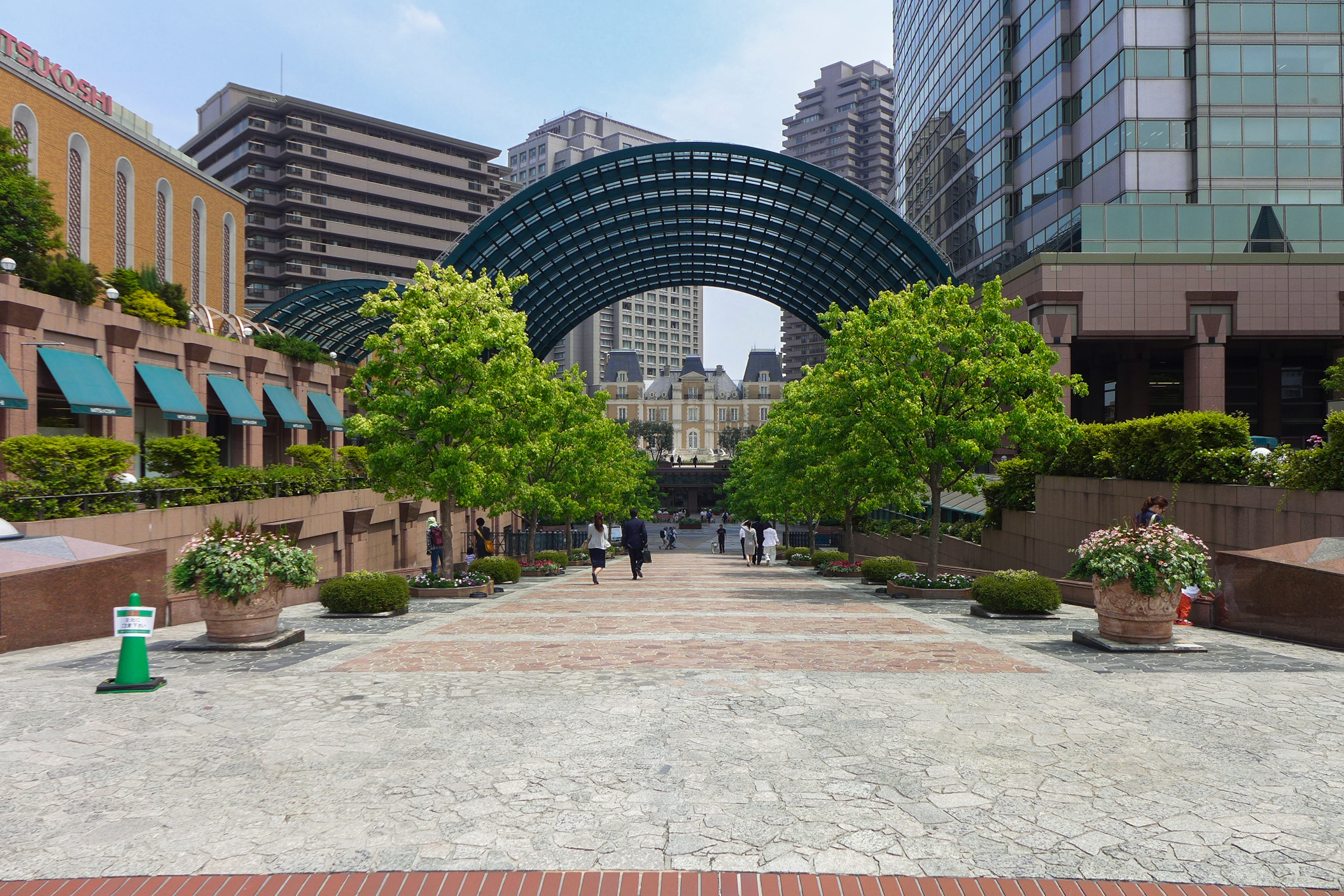
Sloped promenade and central plaza (May 2015)

Yebisu Garden Place occupies a vast site straddling Shibuya and Meguro wards and was developed as a comprehensive urban project combining business, culture, leisure, and residential functions. At the center of the complex stands Yebisu Garden Place Tower, a high-rise office building that serves as its visual and functional core.

The complex includes office buildings, shopping and dining areas, cultural institutions, residential buildings, and landscaped plazas. Its urban design emphasizes walkability, accessibility, and harmony with the surrounding cityscape.

== History ==
The site was originally home to the Sapporo Breweries Ebisu factory, which played a key role in the industrial development of the Ebisu area. After the factory ceased operations, a large-scale redevelopment plan was initiated as part of urban renewal efforts in Tokyo.

Construction began in the early 1990s, and Yebisu Garden Place officially opened on October 8, 1994. The project was developed by Sapporo Breweries and is often cited as a successful example of converting former industrial land into a multifunctional urban district.

== Design and architecture ==
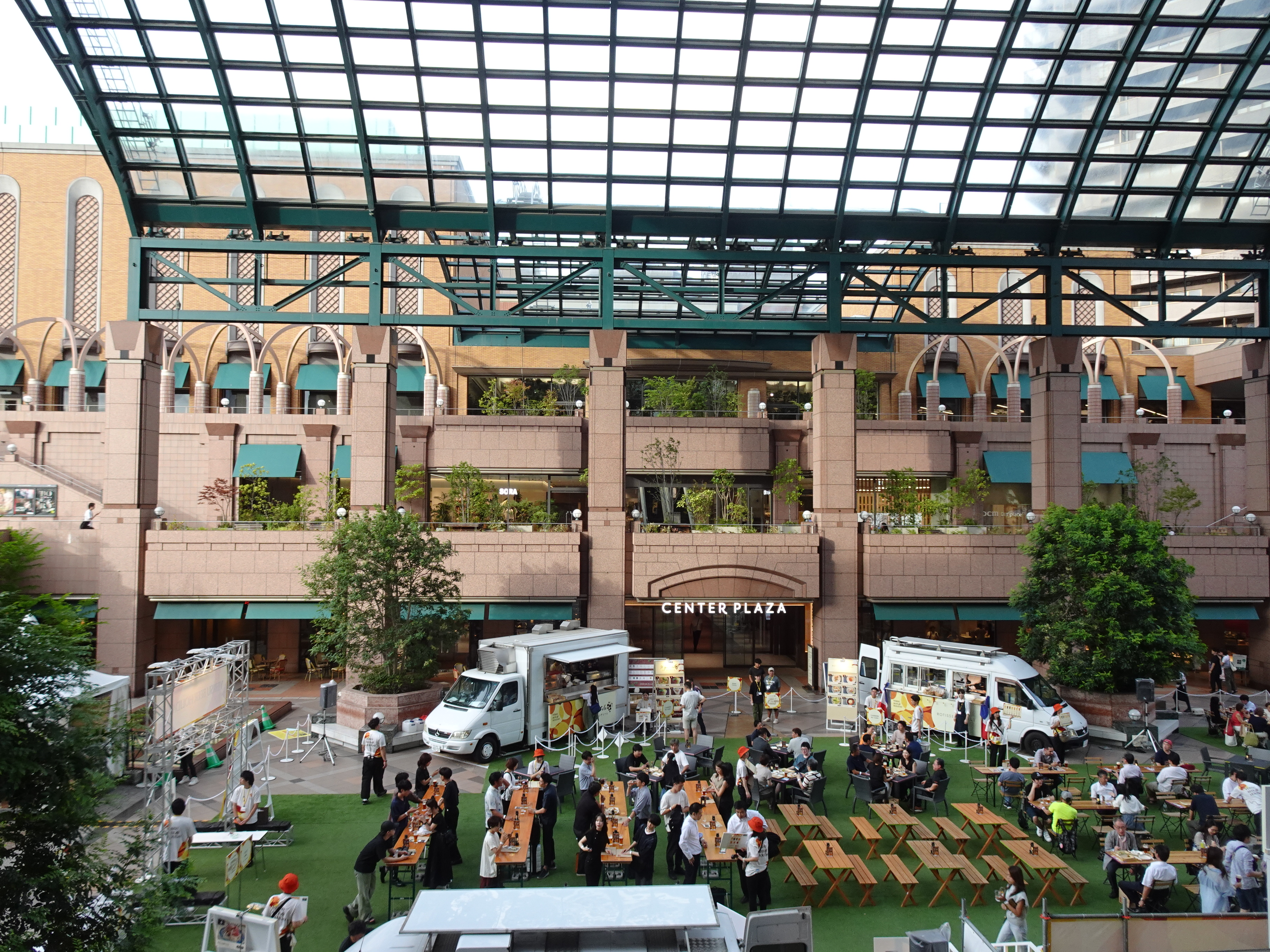
Central plaza (August 2024)

The architectural concept of Yebisu Garden Place combines modern urban functionality with a European-inspired aesthetic. Brick-paved walkways, open plazas, and carefully planned sightlines contribute to the complex's overall design.

Public spaces were designed to be open and accessible, encouraging everyday use by residents as well as visits by tourists. Seasonal events, exhibitions, and illuminations are regularly held, contributing to the area's cultural presence.

== Main facilities ==
=== Yebisu Garden Place Tower ===
Yebisu Garden Place Tower is the central office building of the complex and houses corporate offices, restaurants, and observation facilities.

=== The Garden Hall ===
The Garden Hall is a multipurpose hall for concerts, events, and conferences.

=== Tokyo Photographic Art Museum ===
The Tokyo Photographic Art Museum, located within the complex, is one of Japan's leading museums dedicated to photography and moving images. It hosts a wide range of exhibitions featuring both Japanese and international artists.

=== The Westin Tokyo ===
The Westin Tokyo is a luxury hotel situated within Yebisu Garden Place, providing upscale accommodations for business travelers and tourists.

=== Commercial and residential facilities ===
The complex also includes shopping areas, restaurants, residential buildings, and multipurpose event spaces, forming an integrated environment that combines work, living, and leisure.

== Access ==
Yebisu Garden Place is directly connected to Ebisu Station (Tokyo) via a covered pedestrian passage known as the Moving Walkway. Ebisu Station is served by the JR Yamanote Line, Saikyō Line, Shōnan–Shinjuku Line, and the Tokyo Metro Hibiya Line.
