= 2007 Hansol Korea Open – Doubles =

Doubles
- 2007 Hansol Korea Open

Final
- Champions: (Chinese Taipei) Chuang Chia-jung (Chinese Taipei) Hsieh Su-wei
- Runners-up: (Greece) Eleni Daniilidou (Germany) Jasmin Wöhr
- Score: 6–2, 6–2

Details
- Draw: 16
- Seeds: 4

Events
Singles	Doubles
← 2006 ·	Korea Open	· 2008 →

The doubles event at the 2007 Hansol Korea Open took place between September 24 and September 30 on outdoor hard courts in Seoul, South Korea. Chuang Chia-jung and Hsieh Su-wei won the title, defeating Eleni Daniilidou and Jasmin Wöhr in the final.

== Seeds ==
1. (Chinese Taipei) Chuang Chia-jung / (Chinese Taipei) Hsieh Su-wei (champions)
2. (Greece) Eleni Daniilidou / (Germany) Jasmin Wöhr (final)
3. (France) Séverine Brémond / (Russia) Galina Voskoboeva (quarterfinals)
4. (Japan) Akiko Morigami / (Japan) Aiko Nakamura (first round)

== Draw ==
=== Key ===
- Q = Qualifier
- WC = Wild card
- LL = Lucky loser
- Alt = Alternate
- SE = Special exempt
- PR = Protected ranking
- ITF = ITF entry
- JE = Junior exempt
- w/o = Walkover
- r = Retired
- d = Defaulted
- SR = Special ranking

First round
1	(Chinese Taipei) C-j Chuang (Chinese Taipei) S-w Hsieh	7	6
(Australia) C Dellacqua (Australia) S Ferguson	6^{4}	4
(South Korea) S-j Kim (Japan) A Sugiyama	6	6
(Romania) Á Szatmári (Denmark) C Wozniacki	3	3
4	(Japan) A Morigami (Japan) A Nakamura	7	3	[4]
(South Korea) K-m Chang (South Korea) Y-r Lee	5	6	[10]
(Poland) M Domachowska (Italy) F Pennetta	7	5	[7]
(Japan) A Morita (Japan) J Namigata	5	7	[10]
(France) M Johansson (United States) A Rolle	3	6^{4}
(Colombia) C Castaño (United States) A Spears	6	7
Alt	(United States) C Nagle (United States) R Stephenson	5	6^{5}
3	(France) S Brémond (Russia) G Voskoboeva	7	7
WC	(South Korea) Y-j Cho (South Korea) J-h Kim	6	6
(Chinese Taipei) I-h Hwang (South Korea) M Yoo	1	4
(Germany) M Müller (Thailand) T Tanasugarn	4	2
2	(Greece) E Daniilidou (Germany) J Wöhr	6	6

Quarterfinals
1	(Chinese Taipei) C-j Chuang (Chinese Taipei) S-w Hsieh	7	6
(South Korea) S-j Kim (Japan) A Sugiyama	6^{3}	3
(South Korea) K-m Chang (South Korea) Y-r Lee	4	5
5	(Japan) A Morita (Japan) J Namigata	6	7
(Colombia) C Castaño (United States) A Spears	w/o
3	(France) S Brémond (Russia) G Voskoboeva
WC	(South Korea) Y-j Cho (South Korea) J-h Kim	1	3
2	(Greece) E Daniilidou (Germany) J Wöhr	6	6

Semifinals
1	(Chinese Taipei) C-j Chuang (Chinese Taipei) S-w Hsieh	5	6	[10]
(Japan) A Morita (Japan) J Namigata	7	3	[3]
(Colombia) C Castaño (United States) A Spears	2	6	[1]
2	(Greece) E Daniilidou (Germany) J Wöhr	6	4	[10]

Final
1	(Chinese Taipei) C-j Chuang (Chinese Taipei) S-w Hsieh	6	6
2	(Greece) E Daniilidou (Germany) J Wöhr	2	2
