= 2007 Hansol Korea Open =

- Date: September 24–30
- Edition: 4th
- Category: WTA Tier IV
- Draw: 32S / 16D
- Prize money: $145,000
- Surface: Hard / outdoor
- Location: Seoul, South Korea

Champions

Singles
- (United States) Venus Williams

Doubles
- (Chinese Taipei) Chuang Chia-jung / (Chinese Taipei) Hsieh Su-wei
← 2006 ·	Korea Open	· 2008 →

The 2007 Hansol Korea Open was a women's tennis tournament played on outdoor hard courts. It was the fourth edition of the event known that year as the Hansol Korea Open, and was part of the Tier IV Series of the 2007 WTA Tour. It took place at the Seoul Olympic Park Tennis Center in Seoul, South Korea, from 24 September through 30 September 2007. First-seeded Venus Williams won the singles title.

== Finals ==
=== Singles ===
(United States) Venus Williams defeated (Russia) Maria Kirilenko 6–3, 1–6, 6–4

- It was Wiliams' 3rd and last singles title of the year and the 36th of her career.

=== Doubles ===
(Chinese Taipei) Chuang Chia-jung / (Chinese Taipei) Hsieh Su-wei defeated (Greece) Eleni Daniilidou / (Germany) Jasmin Wöhr 6–2, 6–2
This was Chuang Chia-jung's second consecutive title with Hsieh Su-wei.

== Points and prize money ==
=== Point distribution ===
Event	W	F	SF	QF	Round of 16	Round of 32	Q	Q3	Q2	Q1
Singles	115	80	50	30	15	1	7	3	2	1
Doubles	115	80	50	30	1	—	—	—	—	—

=== Prize money ===
Event	W	F	SF	QF	Round of 16	Round of 32	Q3	Q2	Q1
Singles	$21,140	$11,395	$6,140	$3,310	$1,775	$955	$515	$280	$165
Doubles	$6,240	$3,360	$1,810	$970	$525	—	—	—	—
Doubles prize money per team

== Singles main-draw entrants ==
=== Seeds ===
Country	Player	Rank	Seed
USA	Venus Williams	9	1
HUN	Ágnes Szávay	23	2
JPN	Ai Sugiyama	32	3
RUS	Maria Kirilenko	35	4
GRE	Eleni Daniilidou	37	5
GER	Martina Müller	45	6
JPN	Aiko Nakamura	51	7
JPN	Akiko Morigami	56	8

=== Other entrants ===
The following players received wildcards into the singles main draw:

- (South Korea) Han Sung-hee
- (South Korea) Kim So-jung
- (South Korea) Lee Ye-ra

The following players received entry from the qualifying draw:

- (Poland) Marta Domachowska
- (Japan) Junri Namigata
- (United States) Abigail Spears
- (New Zealand) Marina Erakovic

=== Retirements ===
- (Hungary) Ágnes Szávay (left thigh injury)

== Doubles main-draw entrants ==
=== Seeds ===
Country	Player	Country	Player	Rank	Seed
TPE	Chuang Chia-jung	TPE	Hsieh Su-wei	86	1
GRE	Eleni Daniilidou	GER	Jasmin Wöhr	103	2
FRA	Séverine Brémond	RUS	Galina Voskoboeva	144	3
JPN	Akiko Morigami	JPN	Aiko Nakamura	163	4

=== Other entrants ===
The following pairs received wildcards into the doubles main draw:

- (South Korea) Cho Yoon-jeong / (South Korea) Kim Jin-hee

The following pairs received entries as alternates into the doubles main draw:

- (United States) Courtney Nagle / (United States) Robin Stephenson

=== Retirements ===
Before the tournament:

- (United Kingdom) Anne Keothavong (hip injury)

During the tournament:

- (France) Séverine Brémond (upper leg strain)
