= Kimiko Date =

Japanese tennis player (born 1970)

Kimiko Date 伊達 公子
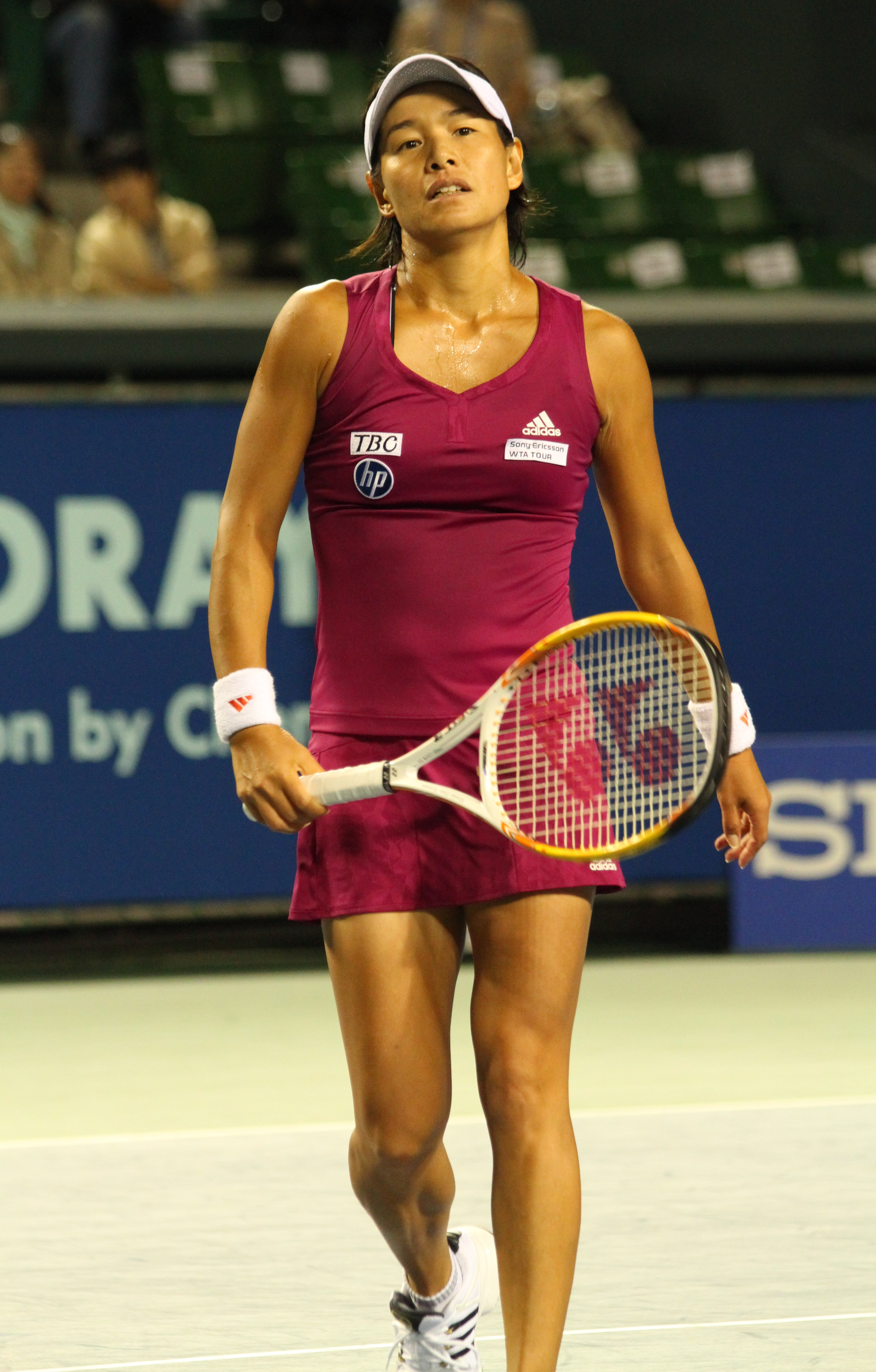
- Date in Japan, 2010
- Country (sports): Japan
- Residence: Tokyo
- Born: 28 September 1970 (age 56) Kyoto, Japan
- Height: 1.63 m (5 ft 4 in)
- Turned pro: March 1989
- Retired: November 1996; 12 September 2017
- Plays: Right-handed (two-handed backhand)
- Prize money: $3,988,378

Singles
- Career record: 450–268
- Career titles: 8 WTA, 14 ITF
- Highest ranking: No. 4 (13 November 1995)

Grand Slam singles results
- Australian Open: SF (1994)
- French Open: SF (1995)
- Wimbledon: SF (1996)
- US Open: QF (1993, 1994)

Other tournaments
- Tour Finals: SF (1994)
- Olympic Games: QF (1996)

Doubles
- Career record: 184–142
- Career titles: 6 WTA, 7 ITF
- Highest ranking: No. 28 (19 January 2015)

Grand Slam doubles results
- Australian Open: QF (1992)
- French Open: 2R (1993, 2011, 2013, 2014, 2015)
- Wimbledon: 3R (2011)
- US Open: SF (2014)

Other doubles tournaments
- Olympic Games: 2R (1992)

Team competitions
- Fed Cup: SF (1996), record 21–11
Medal record
Women's tennis
Representing Japan
Asian Games
Gold medal – first place	1994 Hiroshima	Singles
Bronze medal – third place	2010 Guangzhou	Singles

Kimiko Date (伊達 公子, Date Kimiko; born 28 September 1970) is a Japanese former professional tennis player. She reached the semifinals of the 1994 Australian Open, the 1995 French Open and the 1996 Wimbledon Championships, and won the Japan Open a record four times. She reached a career-high ranking of world No. 4 in 1995, and first retired from professional tennis in November 1996.

Date returned to tennis nearly twelve years later, announcing an unexpected comeback in April 2008. She then won her eighth WTA Tour title at the 2009 Korea Open, becoming the second-oldest player in the Open era, after Billie Jean King, to win a singles title on the WTA Tour. In 2013, she won three WTA Tour titles in doubles and at the 2014 US Open, aged 43, she reached the semifinals of a Grand Slam doubles tournament for the first time in her career. Date announced her final retirement in September 2017.

== Professional career ==
=== 1989–1996 ===
Date began 1990 by reaching the fourth round at the Australian Open, where she was defeated by fourth seed Helena Suková. The following year, ranked world No. 112, she was runner-up in Los Angeles, defeating world No. 3, Gabriela Sabatini, before losing to Monica Seles in the final.

In 1992, Date defeated Arantxa Sánchez Vicario in the Pan Pacific Open and reached the semifinals. She also won the Japan Open, reached the semifinals in the Mizuno World Ladies Open and reached the fourth round at Roland Garros. Date participated in the Barcelona Olympics, losing in the second round. At the end of the year, she received the WTA Most Improved Player of the Year award.

Date won the Japan Open again in 1993. She was runner-up in the Asia Women's Open and the Nichiray Ladies Cup. She reached the semifinals in the Lipton Championships defeating Mary Joe Fernández. In the US Open, she reached the quarterfinals beating Jana Novotná in the fourth round.

In 1994, Date won the Sydney International in January, defeating world No. 4, Conchita Martínez, and Mary Joe Fernández on her way to the title, after which she entered the world's top 10 for the first time. She beat Martinez again the following week at the Australian Open on the way to her first Grand Slam semifinal. Date won her third consecutive Japan Open. At the 1994 Asian Games, she won gold in the women's singles. At the end-of-year WTA Finals, she defeated Martinez again, before losing to eventual champion Sabatini in the semifinals, in three sets.

Date won her first, and only, Tier I tournament at the Pan Pacific Open in 1995, defeating Martinez and Lindsay Davenport to the title. She was also runner-up in the tier one Miami Open, defeating Sabatini before losing to Graf in straight sets. Date defeated Davenport again on her way to the semifinals of the French Open, reached the quarterfinals at Wimbledon, and was runner-up in Tokyo and Strasbourg, reaching a career-high ranking of No. 4 in November 1995.

In 1996, Date won both singles and doubles in the Japan Open. In the Fed Cup, she defeated world No. 1 Graf for the first and only time, winning 7–6, 3–6, 12–10. At Wimbledon, she beat world No. 2, Conchita Martínez, in the fourth round and Mary Pierce in the quarterfinal, before losing to eventual champion Graf in the semifinals in three sets. Date defeated Martinez in the semifinals and world No. 2, Arantxa Sánchez Vicario, in the finals of San Diego. and reached the quarterfinals in the 1996 Summer Olympics. Date announced her retirement – aged 25 – in September, and played her final match at the WTA Finals, losing to Martina Hingis in the quarterfinals.

=== 2008: Comeback ===
On 6 April 2008, nearly 12 years after retiring, Date announced she would return to the professional tour at the age of 37.

She qualified for the $50k Kangaroo Cup in Gifu, Japan. In the first round, she played compatriot and world No. 183 Rika Fujiwara. In only her fourth match on the tour for eleven years, Date won in three sets. At the quarterfinal stage, Date came up against world No. 80 and fellow Japanese, Aiko Nakamura, whom she beat in three sets. This marked her first top-100 win of her comeback. In her semifinal match, she defeated No. 3 seed Melanie South. However, in the final, she was defeated by Tamarine Tanasugarn, in three sets. She won the doubles title at that tournament with teenage and fellow Japanese partner Kurumi Nara, defeating Melanie South and Nicole Thyssen in a match tie-breaker.

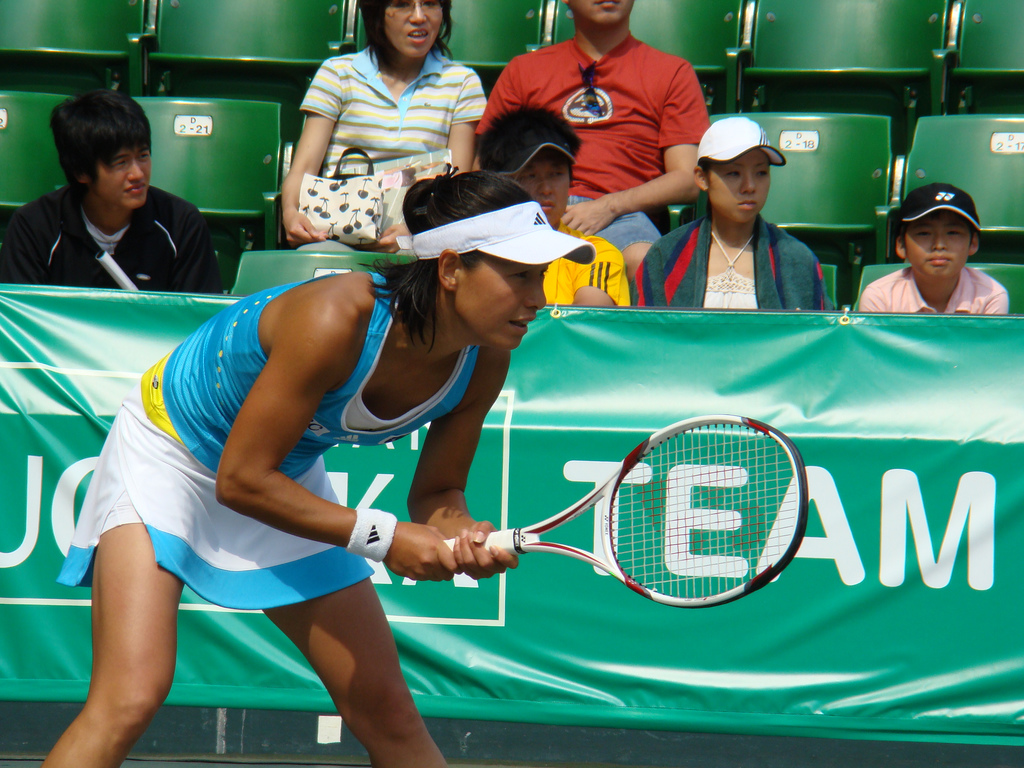
Date in 2008

Her next event was another $50k event in Fukuoka, Japan. She defeated both Nicole Kriz and Rika Fujiwara to reach the quarterfinals where she lost to Aiko Nakamura in straight sets. She then defeated Shiho Hisamatsu and Zhou Yimiao to reach the quarterfinals where she lost to Tomoko Yonemura in straight sets, in another tournament in Japan, a 50k event in Kurume. On 15 June 2008, she defeated Shiho Akita to win the Tokyo Ariake International Ladies Open for her first post-comeback championship. Her second came over a month after, as on 20 July, she won a $25k event in Miyazaki, Japan, defeating Chae Kyung-yee in the final. On 3 August, she won the $25k event in Obihiro, Japan. In the final, she beat Suchanun Viratprasert.

Date made her WTA Tour comeback at the Tier-I event in Tokyo where she was awarded a wildcard into the qualifying tournament. She won through to the final round of qualifying after defeating Mari Tanaka of Japan and Australian Casey Dellacqua (the fifth seed in the qualifying competition). Both of these victories came in tight three-set matches. She lost in the final round to Aleksandra Wozniak of Canada in straight sets. Along with fellow Japanese Fujiwara, Date also competed in doubles, as wildcard entrant. However, they lost in three tight sets in the first round. Date was in the main draw for the Japan Open but lost in the first round to Shahar Pe'er.

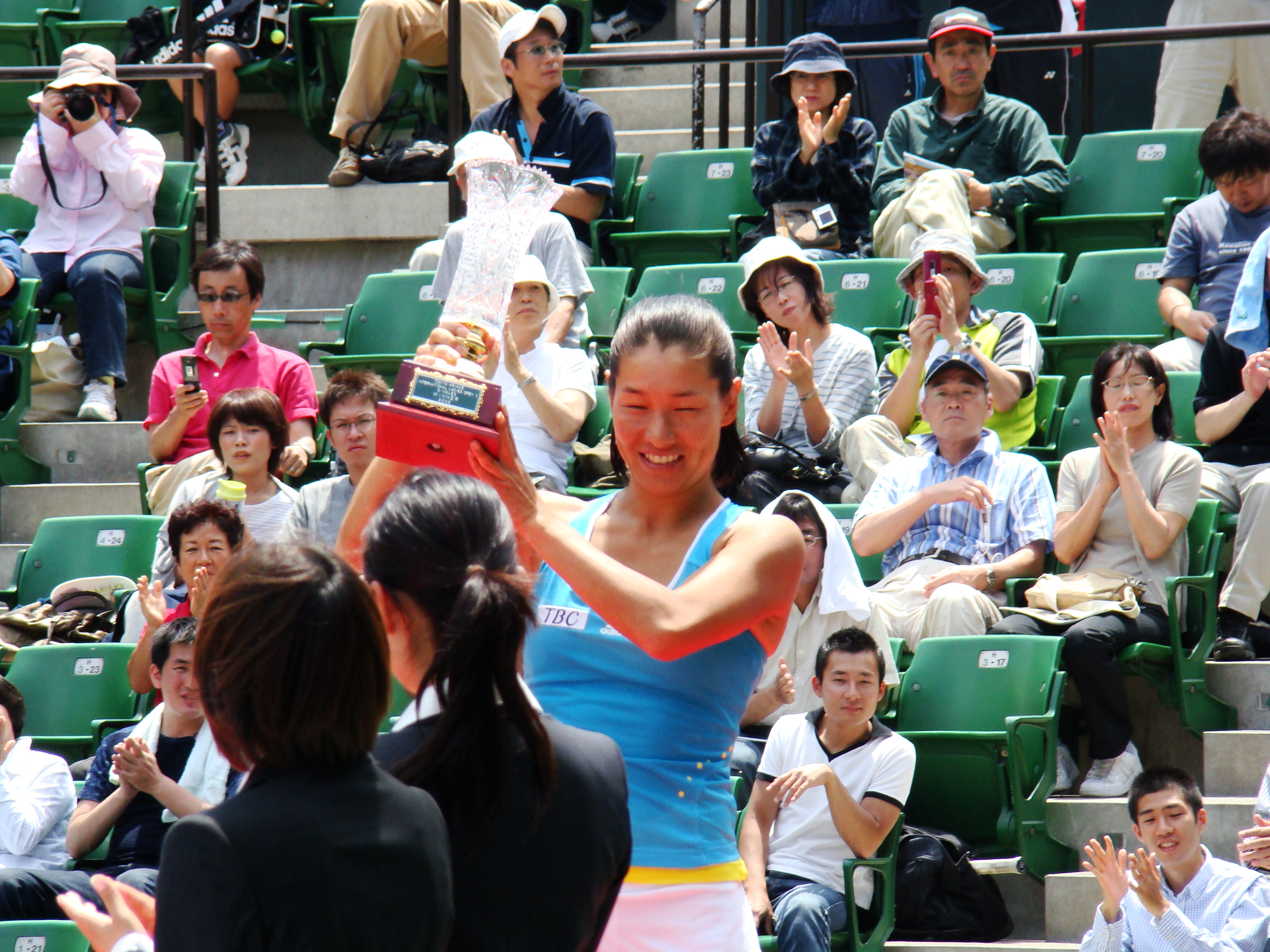
Date holding the trophy at the Tokyo International Ladies Open in 2008

In October, she played her first tournament out of Japan since November 1996, in the quarterfinals at the Taipei Ladies Open. In November, she competed at the All-Japan Tennis Championships, her first appearance there in 16 years. Date won both the singles and doubles titles.

=== 2009 ===
Date received a wildcard entrant to the main draw of the Auckland Open where she was overpowered by Jill Craybas in the first round. Later in January, Date qualified for the Australian Open and met Kaia Kanepi in the first round, where she lost a close three-setter.

Date then played in the main draw of the International event in Pattaya City. In the first round, she was defeated by the eighth-seeded Slovak Magdaléna Rybáriková in three sets. She then reached the quarterfinals of an ITF event in Clearwater, Florida, beating Lauren Embree of the US and fellow Japanese player Aiko Nakamura before losing to third-seeded Slovak Jarmila Groth in three sets. She then played at a $25k event in Hammond, Louisiana where she breezed past qualifier Heidi El Tabakh. She then beat American Lauren Albanese in the round of 16 for a place in the quarterfinals where she lost to qualifier Lindsay Lee-Waters in three sets. Date moved onto the $75k in Monzón, Spain, her first European event since July 1996. Seeded sixth, victories over Spaniard Eva Fernandez-Bruges and Croat Ana Vrljić took her to the quarterfinals. There she beat British top seed Elena Baltacha, 5–7, 6–4, 7–6. She followed that win by beating Arantxa Parra Santonja to reach the final, and she earned a two-set-victory over Romanian qualifier Alexandra Dulgheru to claim the biggest title of her comeback that far.

Date was awarded a wildcard entry to the Wimbledon Championships. This was her first competition at Wimbledon in 13 years. In the first round she lost to ninth seed Caroline Wozniacki with her performance in the second and third sets diminished due to an injury.

In the Guangzhou International Open, Date, partnering Sun Tiantian, reached her first WTA Tour final since she had come back to the tour, but lost in a tight match.

At the Korea Open in Seoul, Date won her first WTA level match after the return, against Lee Ye-ra, and came up with a second victory right after over Alisa Kleybanova, coming back from a set and 5–2 down. In the quarterfinals, Kimiko defeated top seed Daniela Hantuchová in three sets lasting over two and a half hours. In the semifinals, she defeated defending champion Maria Kirilenko. In the final, which was held one day before her 39th birthday, Date defeated Anabel Medina Garrigues to win her first WTA Tour title since her comeback. Thus, she became the second-oldest player in the Open era to win a singles title on the tour, after Billie Jean King, who won Birmingham in 1983, aged 39 years, 7 months and 23 days.

Date then received a wildcard to play at the inaugural Tournament of Champions, the year-end championship, held in Bali, Indonesia. She was in Group C, along with Yanina Wickmayer and Anabel Medina Garrigues. She lost her first match against Wickmayer by a close 6–7, 2–6, but she won her second match against Medina Garrigues in straight sets. Due to Wickmayer's ban from the sport for one year, Date made the semifinals but lost to top seed Marion Bartoli.

=== 2010 ===
Date started 2010 with participation in Auckland where she received a wildcard to enter the maindraw. She easily beat former world No. 5, Anna Chakvetadze, in the first round, and then recovered from a set down to beat fifth seed Virginie Razzano for her first win over a top-20 player after her comeback. In the quarterfinals, Date was beaten 6–2, 6–2 by the third seed and eventual champion Yanina Wickmayer. She then qualified for Sydney International, a Premier tournament. In the opening round, she defeated Nadia Petrova for her second top-20 victory of 2010. In the second round, she came close to claiming her first top-10 win since 1996 when she pushed world No. 7, Victoria Azarenka, having at one stage trailed 1–6, 2–4. Date competed at the Australian Open in Melbourne, the first time since her comeback that she has had direct acceptance into a Grand Slam main draw. In the first round, she fell to Yaroslava Shvedova in straight sets.

In February, Date played for Japan's Fed Cup team for the first time since 1996. By winning all of her four matches, she was instrumental in securing her team's advance to the World Group II play-offs. At the PTT Pattaya Open in Thailand, she was seeded seventh but fell to Anastasia Rodionova in the first round.

Date defeated Melinda Czink in the first round of the Indian Wells Open, before falling to No. 15 seed Francesca Schiavone in the second. She also made it to the second round of the Miami Open by defeating former top-10 player Anna Chakvetadze. She then lost to No. 16 seed Nadia Petrova.

Date began her clay-court season at the Estoril Open in Portugal. In the first round, she outlasted 19-year-old Petra Martić, defeating her in 3 hours and 12 minutes 6–7, 7–5, 7–6. She played Anastasija Sevastova (who ousted top seed Ágnes Szávay in the first round) in the second round, but retired due to a recurring calf injury.

At the French Open, she defeated No. 9 seed and former world No. 1, 2009 runner-up Dinara Safina in the first round, despite being 2–4 down in the second set and two breaks down at 1–4 in the third, plus having an apparent calf injury. This was her first win in a grandslam's main draw since 1997 and at 39y/7m/26d, she became the oldest player ever to beat a top-10 player (previous-oldest was Billie Jean King at 39y/6m/29d). She was defeated by wildcard Jarmila Groth in the second round.

In Stanford, Date again defeated Safina in the first round, after trailing by a set and 2–0. Following the conclusion of the US Open series, Date, ranked 50th, became the oldest top-50 player since Billie Jean King in 1984.

At the US Open, Date received direct entry into the main draw but lost to two-time Grand Slam champion Svetlana Kuznetsova in the first round. She then traveled to Seoul to defend her title at the Korea Open but lost in the quarterfinals to Ágnes Szávay. One week later, she accepted wildcard entry at the Pan Pacific Open in Tokyo. She beat the defending champion and former world No. 1, Maria Sharapova, in the first round, 7–5, 3–6, 6–3. She then faced Daniela Hantuchová in the second round and won 2–6, 6–0, 4–0, as Hantuchová retired. This was on her 40th birthday. She then lost to French Open champion Francesca Schiavone in the third round 6–3, 6–3. Later on that same week, she went to China to participate at the China Open. She beat Anabel Medina Garrigues in the first round, but lost to Elena Dementieva in the second round, in three sets. Kimiko then returned home to compete at the Japan Open in Osaka. Seeded sixth, she defeated teenage qualifier Laura Robson in the first round and compatriot Aiko Nakamura. In the quarterfinals, she upset top seed and world No. 8, Samantha Stosur (becoming the first 40-something player to win a match against a top-10 player) to book a semifinal encounter with third seed Shahar Pe'er. She beat her but lost the final match to unseeded Tanasugarn. With that reaching of the final in Osaka, she once again entered the top-50 WTA rankings at No. 48. Also, this final in Osaka had the oldest combined age of WTA tournament finalists at 73 (Date 40, Tanasugarn 33).

Date then received a wildcard to enter the Tournament of Champions in Bali, Indonesia for the second time in a row. Despite at one point having her serve broken seven consecutive times, she defeated first seeded, Li Na in the quarterfinals after being down 1–3 in the third set. She lost to Ana Ivanovic in the semifinals, but won the third place match against Daniela Hantuchová by the scoreline of 7–5, 7–5. With that performance in Bali, she was once again in the top 50s, moving up to No. 46, but falling back to finish the year at No. 51.

Her last activity of 2010 was participation in the Asian Games, where she won a bronze medal in singles and with Japan in the team competition.

=== 2011 ===
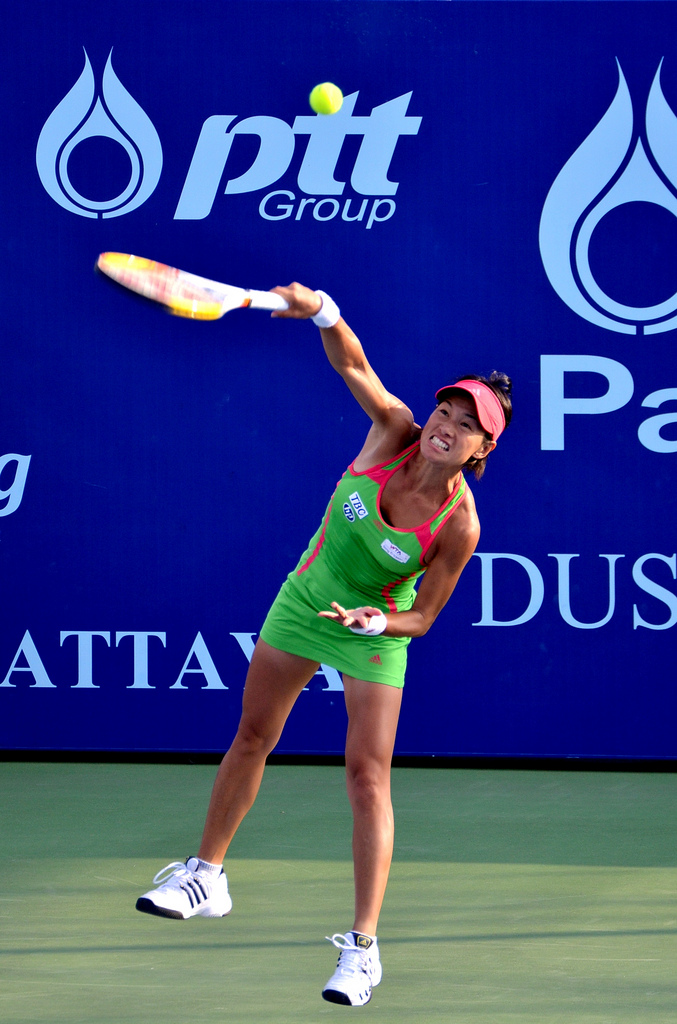
Date in 2011

Date's first two tournaments of 2011 were in Auckland and Hobart. She would go on to lose in both first rounds to Kateryna Bondarenko, then Angelique Kerber the following week. Date's next tournament was the Australian Open where she lost a close encounter 4–6, 6–4, 5–7 to 12th seed Agnieszka Radwańska in the first round. Date held a 4–1 lead in the final set when her opponent called a medical time out. When play resumed, she suffered from cramps and found it hard to move losing six of the final seven games after the rhythm of the match had been interrupted as she stated in her post match interview. Date earned her first victory of the 2011 season at the Pattaya Open, defeating Renata Voráčová. At Indian Wells, Date gained direct entry into the tournament. In the first round she defeated Yaroslava Shvedova, in straight sets, but lost to Ana Ivanovic in the second round. She then also reached the second round of Miami but again lost to Ivanovic in straight sets.

Date then suffered four consecutive losses in her clay-court campaign, in Barcelona, Madrid, Rome, and Strasbourg. In the French Open, she lost in straight sets in the first round to world No. 1, Caroline Wozniacki. She started out the grass-court season with a surprise doubles championship with Zhang Shuai in the Nottingham ITF tournament. But her singles losing streak continued, as she lost in the first round of Birmingham to eventual champion Sabine Lisicki. The week after, she ended her seven consecutive losses in 's-Hertogenbosch where she defeated sixth-seeded Maria Kirilenko in the first round and Lourdes Domínguez Lino in the second round. In her first quarterfinals appearance in 2011, she lost to Romina Oprandi.

At Wimbledon, Date defeated British wildcard Katie O'Brien, 6–0, 7–5. This win also marked her first main-draw victory at Wimbledon in fifteen years. In the second round, after winning the opening set, she lost a close-fought match on Centre Court to former world No. 1 and 23rd seed, Venus Williams, 7–6, 3–6, 6–8 in a match lasting 2 hours, 56 minutes. With her partner Zhang Shuai, She advanced to the third round of the women's doubles at Wimbledon for the first time in her career.

After qualifying for the Cincinnati Open, Date had an accident falling in the bathtub and injuring her left hand, forcing her out of competition for four to six weeks, requiring her to pull out of the tournament and not playing competitively until losing in the first round of the US Open to Sílvia Soler Espinosa 6–7, 6–7.

At the HP Open, Date again teamed with Zhang Shuai and defeated Vania King and Yaroslava Shvedova in the doubles final to win her first WTA level doubles title since 1996. She then flew to Europe to participate at the Luxembourg Open but lost in the first round. At this point, her ranking fell to world No. 144.

Post to that loss, Date had good runs participating at three higher-tier tournaments in the ITF Circuit. She came in victorious in Poitiers and placed runner-up in both Taipei and Toyota. Her good runs in the circuit brought her ranking back to within the top 100; she finished 2011 ranked 87th in the world, her third successive top-100 finish since her 2008 comeback.

=== 2012 ===
Date started her year participating at a 50k+H event in Quanzhou, China as the first seed in both singles and doubles. She came in victorious in singles, winning the title by beating Tímea Babos in the final, and finished as the runner up in doubles, partnering with Zhang Shuai, to Chan Hao-ching and Rika Fujiwara.

At the Australian Open Date lost in the first round to Eleni Daniilidou in singles, and with Zhang Shuai, lost in the first round in doubles to 14th seeds Hsieh Su-wei and Galina Voskoboeva. However, she and Kei Nishikori received a wildcard entry into the mixed doubles draw and, in her first ever Grand Slam mixed-doubles match, defeated the team of Gisela Dulko and Eduardo Schwank to advance to the round of 16.

Then, Date earned her first WTA main draw victory of the season in Pattaya by reaching the second-round where she lost to Hsieh Su-wei. She lost in the first round of Monterrey and reached the second round of Indian Wells where she lost to Vera Zvonareva. In the first round of Miami, she faced former world No. 1 Venus Williams for the second time. She lost 0–6, 3–6. After consecutive losses in Charleston and Copenhagen, she played at a 50k event in Gifu, Japan as the first seed. She eventually won the title after defeating Noppawan Lertcheewakarn in the final. She then lost first round at Cagnes-sur-Mer when she had to retire against Anastasiya Yakimova. Following this, she made the quarterfinals of the ITF Prague losing to No. 2 seed Klára Zakopalová. She then lost in the first found of ten consecutive tournaments all of which were WTA or Grand Slam events except for ITF Nottingham. Nevertheless, she finished the year strong. She made the quarterfinals of Limoges losing to Stefanie Vögele. She then lost narrowly (as defending champion) in the first round of the ITF event in Poitiers to Elena Vesnina. She then made the quarterfinals of the WTA Taipei losing to Kristina Mladenovic 3–6, 0–6. From here, Date made the finals of each of her next three tournaments. She lost to Elina Svitolina at the Pune final, and to Stefanie Vögele at the ITF Toyota final. She then beat Yulia Putintseva to win Al Habtoor Challenge (ITF Dubai), her last tournament of the year. She ended the calendar year ranked 99 on 31 December 2012 (not to be confused with the WTA's 'year-end ranking' which is determined prior to this date), securing a berth in the upcoming 2013 Australian Open, and finishing in the top 100 for a fourth consecutive calendar year (and 10th overall).

=== 2013 ===
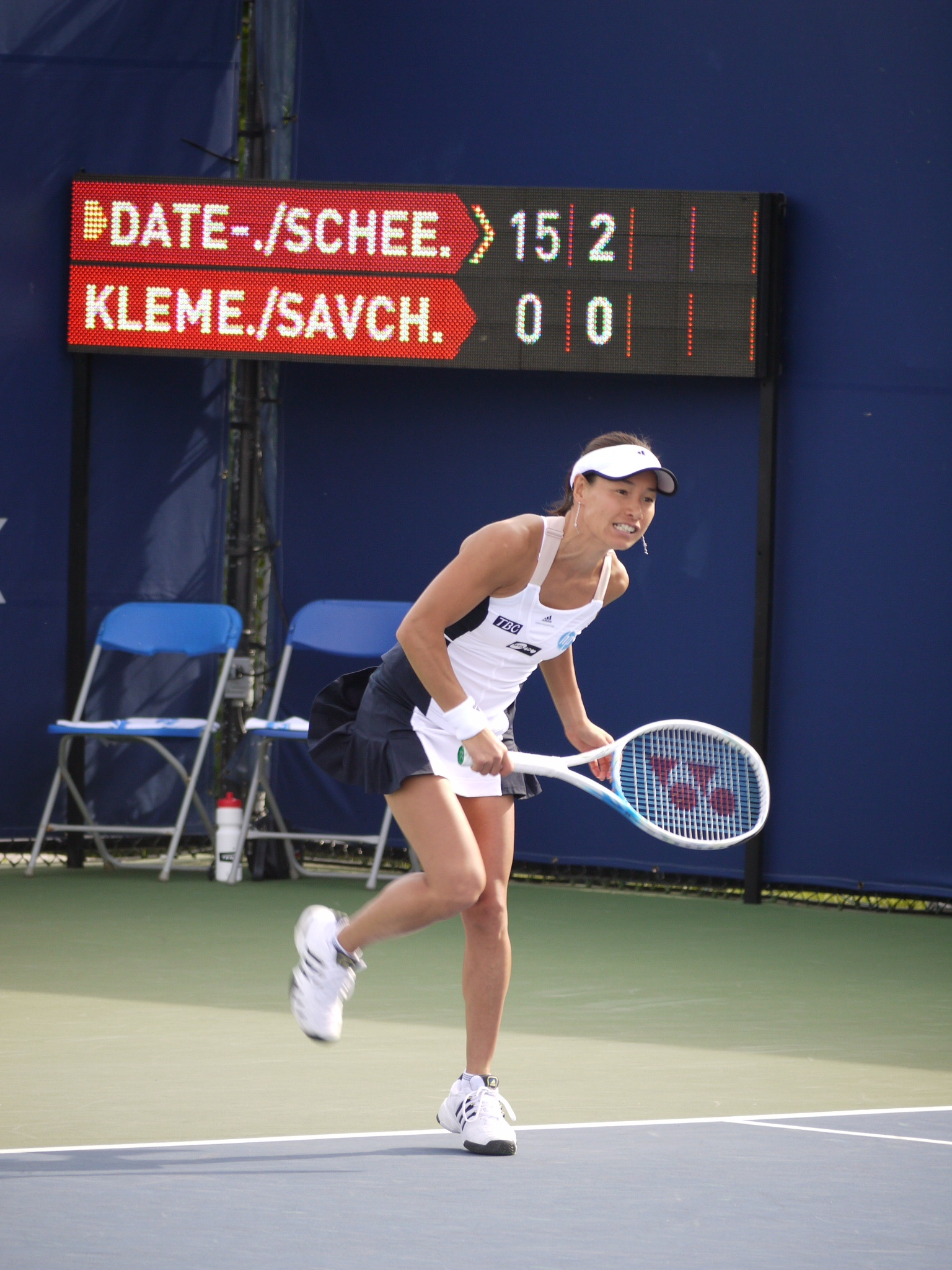
Date playing doubles with Scheepers at the 2013 Rogers Cup in Toronto

Date started the year narrowly losing to Duan Yingying in the first round of WTA Shenzhen 6–7, 5–7 after going through qualifying. She then went through qualifying in Sydney and lost to Agnieszka Radwańska in the round of 16 by 4–6, 3–6. At the Australian Open, Date won a singles match in this tournament for the first time since 1996, defeating No. 12 seed Nadia Petrova in straight sets, and becoming the oldest woman to ever win a main draw singles match in the Australian Open. She beat Shahar Pe'er in the second round, but then lost to Serbian Bojana Jovanovski. She went on to lose in the second round of Pattaya City to Ayumi Morita. After a string of losses in Fed Cup and Florianópolis she made the second round of Indian Wells pushing Elena Vesnina to three sets losing in three sets. She made the second round of Miami losing to Venus Williams. She retired in her first- and second-round matches at Monterrey and ITF Gifu.

Date skipped most of the clay-court season choosing only to participate in one warm-up tournament prior to the French Open. At Strasburg, she picked up a sixth WTA doubles title partnering with Chanelle Scheepers. She began the grass-court season in Birmingham losing first round to Alla Kudryavtseva. At Wimbledon, she became the oldest woman ever to reach the third round, losing to Serena Williams 2–6, 0–6.

She lost in the quarterfinals of Vancouver and in qualifying at Cincinnati. She lost in the first round of the US Open to Paula Ormaechea. She lost in the quarterfinals of Seoul to Francesca Schiavone after beating second seed (and then 19th ranked) Maria Kirilenko in the second round 6–3, 6–1. Her WTA 'Year-end ranking' was 54th, but finished the calendar year ranked 75th due to losses in qualifying and early rounds of Tokyo, Beijing, Osaka, Nanjing, and Taipei near the end of the year. This was the fifth consecutive calendar year she finished in the top 100 (and 11th overall).

=== 2014: Grand Slam doubles semifinal ===
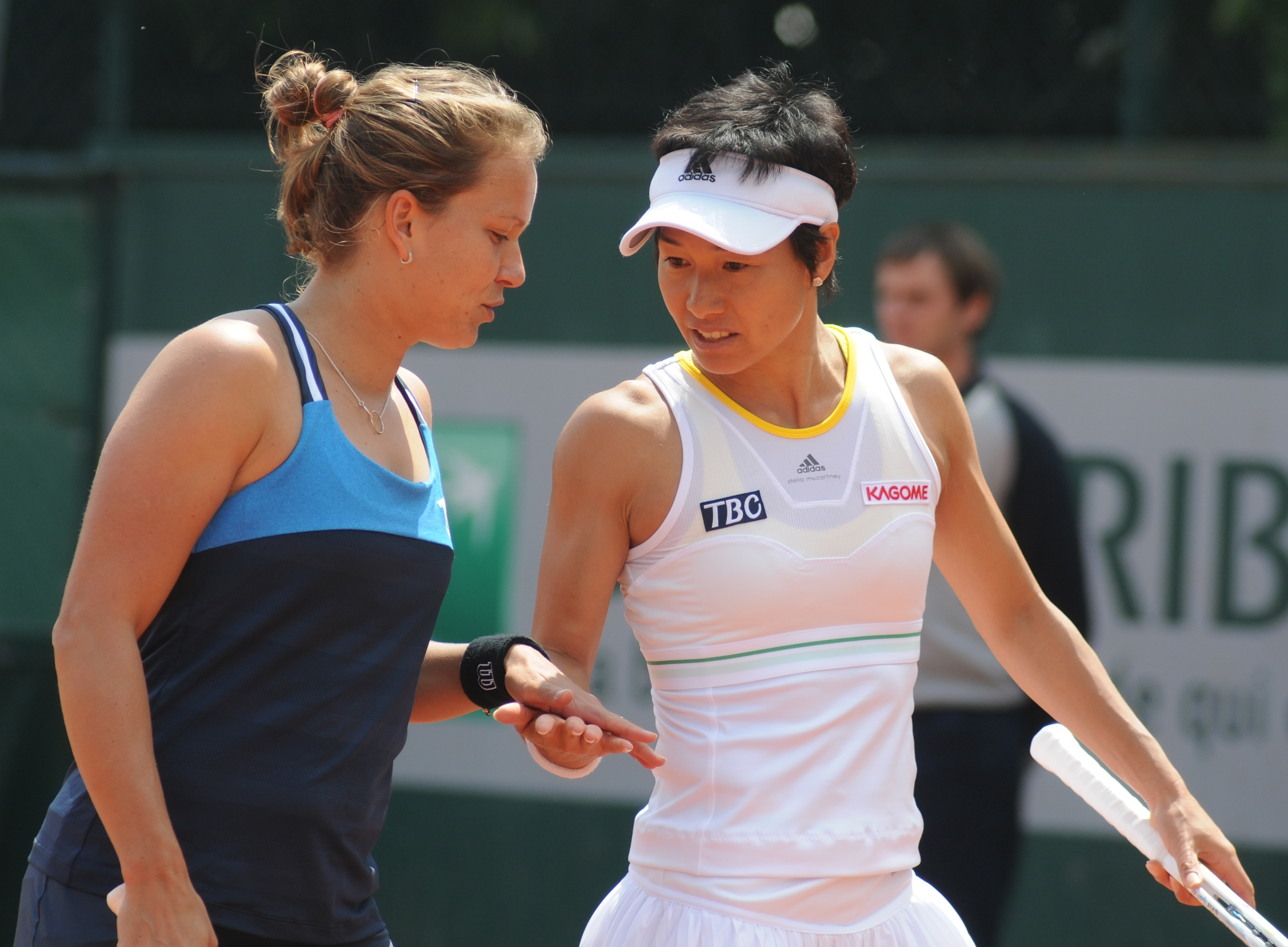
Date with Barbora Strýcová in 2014

In the round of 16 at Brisbane International, Date pushed Dominika Cibulková (who would become a 2014 Australian Open finalist) to three sets. After qualifying and first-round losses at Sydney and the Australian Open, she lost in the quarterfinals of Pattaya City to Ekaterina Makarova in three sets. She lost in qualifying and early rounds of Acapulco, Indian Wells, and Miami. She made the semifinals of Monterrey losing to Jovana Jakšić in a close three-setter. She lost in early rounds of Kuala Lumpur, and Seoul. She then lost in the first round of the French Open to Anastasia Pavlyuchenkova. She made the quarterfinals of Birmingham losing to Casey Dellacqua 1–6, 0–6. She lost first round of Wimbledon to eventual quarterfinalist Ekaterina Makarova. She lost early in Stanford, Montréal, and Cincinnati. She lost in the first round of the US Open to Venus Williams, but made the semifinals of doubles with Barbora Záhlavová-Strýcová. She retired from her second-round match in Hong Kong losing to Francesca Schiavone. She then lost first round in Tokyo to Victoria Azarenka. In October, she matched her then career-high doubles ranking of 33. She would go on to reach a new career high of 28 in doubles early the following year.

=== 2016 ===
Date played just one match in 2016, at the Australian Open, where she lost in qualifying to Amandine Hesse. Shortly after the tournament, she announced that she would be undergoing surgery on her left knee, after an MRI scan revealed that a crack in the knee had become a rupture. It was also reported that her meniscus was badly worn out.

=== 2017 ===
Date rejected the assumption that she would retire after her injury, stating "I didn't want to just quit because I was hurt. I used it as motivation." At 46 years of age, Date played her first match in over a year at the Kangaroo Cup. Awarded a wildcard entry into the main draw, she lost to eventual runner-up Zhu Lin 2–6, 2–6. She then won three qualifying matches for a tournament in Changwon, but lost in the first round to Park So-hyun. Her next match was not until several months later, in July, at the Stockton Challenger; she was again defeated in the first round, losing 6–4, 3–6, 0–6 to Usue Maitane Arconada.

Date announced that she would retire after the Japan Women's Open, saying that she had been troubled with ongoing knee and shoulder pain. In the first round, she was defeated 6–0, 6–0 by Aleksandra Krunić.

== Playing style ==
Date played with short backswings on both forehand and backhand sides. Date's playstyle is representative of those that dominated during her first career in the 1990s using less topspin in favour of a flatter shot. She is considered to possess the most notable "pancake" forehand in the women's game, with one of the lowest average spin RPM ever. She relies on her opponent's power to hit sharp angles and catch her opponents off-guard.

Since her comeback, Date played the best on grass, and her style was once described as "all stealthy, neat athleticism".

== Personal life ==
Date was born in Kyoto, Japan. Her father was Juichi (died in 2007) and her mother is Masako. She has two siblings: Ryusuke and Junko. Date first played tennis at the age of six. She is left-handed, but was trained to play right-handed to follow Japanese custom. She was the tennis champion at Sonoda Gakuen Junior High School & Senior High School, where she graduated in 1989.

In December 2001, she married German auto racing driver Michael Krumm, they divorced in September 2016. On 28 September 2022—her 52nd birthday—she announced that she had married her partner of five years in January of that year.

She previously owned and ran a German bakery in Ebisu, Shibuya, named Frau Krumm. However, it has since been permanently closed.

In October 2017, she was included on the BBC's annual 100 Women list.

== Career statistics ==
=== Grand Slam performance timelines ===
Key
W	F	SF	QF	#R	RR	Q#	P#	DNQ	A	Z#	PO	G	S	B	NMS	NTI	P	NH

(W) winner; (F) finalist; (SF) semifinalist; (QF) quarterfinalist; (#R) rounds 4, 3, 2, 1; (RR) round-robin stage; (Q#) qualification round; (P#) preliminary round; (DNQ) did not qualify; (A) absent; (Z#) Davis/Fed Cup Zonal Group (with number indication) or (PO) play-off; (G) gold, (S) silver or (B) bronze Olympic/Paralympic medal; (NMS) not a Masters tournament; (NTI) not a Tier I tournament; (P) postponed; (NH) not held; (SR) strike rate (events won / competed); (W–L) win–loss record.

==== Singles ====
Tournament	1989	1990	1991	1992	1993	1994	1995	1996	...	2009	2010	2011	2012	2013	2014	2015	2016	SR	W–L
Australian Open	A	4R	2R	2R	2R	SF	3R	2R		1R	1R	1R	1R	3R	1R	1R	Q1	0 / 14	16–14
French Open	2R	A	Q2	4R	2R	1R	SF	4R		Q1	2R	1R	1R	1R	1R	Q1	A	0 / 11	14–11
Wimbledon	1R	2R	1R	2R	A	3R	QF	SF		1R	1R	2R	1R	3R	1R	Q1	A	0 / 13	16–13
US Open	1R	2R	2R	2R	QF	QF	4R	1R		Q2	1R	1R	1R	1R	1R	Q1	A	0 / 13	14–13
Win–loss	1–3	5–3	2–3	6–4	6–3	11–4	14–4	9–4		0–2	1–4	1–4	0–4	4–4	0–4	0–1	0–0	0 / 51	60–51

==== Doubles ====
Tournament	1990	1991	1992	1993	...	2010	2011	2012	2013	2014	2015	SR	W–L
Australian Open	1R	A	QF	3R		1R	2R	1R	3R	1R	2R	0 / 9	8–9
French Open	A	A	1R	2R		A	2R	1R	2R	2R	2R	0 / 7	5–7
Wimbledon	A	2R	1R	A		1R	3R	1R	1R	2R	2R	0 / 8	5–8
US Open	A	1R	1R	2R		2R	A	1R	1R	SF	1R	0 / 8	6–8
Win–loss	0–1	1–2	3–4	3–3		1–3	4–3	0–4	3–4	6–4	3–4	0 / 32	24–32

== Video games ==
- Date Kimiko no Virtual Tennis (1994, Super Famicom)
