= 2009 Hansol Korea Open =

- Date: 21–27 September
- Edition: 6th
- Category: WTA International
- Draw: 32S / 16D
- Prize money: $220,000
- Surface: Hard / outdoor
- Location: Seoul, South Korea
- Venue: Seoul Olympic Park Tennis Center

Champions

Singles
- (Japan) Kimiko Date-Krumm

Doubles
- (Chinese Taipei) Chan Yung-jan / (United States) Abigail Spears
← 2008 ·	Korea Open	· 2010 →

The 2009 Hansol Korea Open was a women's tennis tournament played on outdoor hard courts. It was the sixth edition of the event known that year as the Hansol Korea Open, and was part of the WTA International category of the 2009 WTA Tour. It was held at the Seoul Olympic Park Tennis Center in Seoul, South Korea, from 21 September 27 through September 2009. Unseeded Date-Krumm, one day short of her 39th birthday, became the second-oldest player in the Open era to win a singles title on the WTA Tour, after Billie Jean King, who won the Edgbaston Cup at Birmingham in 1983 aged 39 and seven months.

== Finals ==
=== Singles ===
(Japan) Kimiko Date-Krumm defeated (Spain) Anabel Medina Garrigues, 6–3, 6–3

- It was her only singles title of the year, 1st title after 13 years break, and the 8th and last of her career.

=== Doubles ===
(Chinese Taipei) Chan Yung-jan / (United States) Abigail Spears defeated (United States) Carly Gullickson / (Australia) Nicole Kriz, 6–3, 6–4

== Entrants ==
=== Seeds ===
Country	Player	Rank^{1}	Seed
SVK	Daniela Hantuchová	21	1
ESP	Anabel Medina Garrigues	23	2
ITA	Francesca Schiavone	24	3
ROU	Sorana Cîrstea	29	4
RUS	Alisa Kleybanova	31	5
RUS	Anastasia Pavlyuchenkova	41	6
RUS	Vera Dushevina	46	7
AUT	Sybille Bammer	47	8

- ^{1} Seeds are based on the rankings of September 14, 2009

=== Other entrants ===
The following players received wildcards into the singles main draw

- (South Korea) Yoo Mi
- (South Korea) Kim So-Jung
- (South Korea) Lee Ye-Ra

The following players received entry from the qualifying draw:

- (Japan) Yurika Sema
- (Chinese Taipei) Chang Kai-Chen
- (Australia) Sophie Ferguson
- (Japan) Junri Namigata
