= 2009 Hansol Korea Open – Doubles =

Doubles
- 2009 Hansol Korea Open

Final
- Champion: (Chinese Taipei) Chan Yung-jan (United States) Abigail Spears
- Runner-up: (United States) Carly Gullickson (Australia) Nicole Kriz
- Score: 6–3, 6–4

Details
- Draw: 16
- Seeds: 4

Events
Singles	Doubles
← 2008 ·	Korea Open	· 2010 →

Chuang Chia-jung and Hsieh Su-wei were the defending champion, but Hsieh chose not to participate that year.
Chuang partnered with Yan Zi, but they lost in the semifinals against Chan Yung-jan and Abigail Spears.
Chan Yung-jan and Abigail Spears won in the final 6–3, 6–4 against Carly Gullickson and Nicole Kriz.

== Seeds ==
1. (Germany) Anna-Lena Grönefeld / (Slovenia) Katarina Srebotnik (quarterfinals, Srebotnik withdrew due to right shoulder injury)
2. (Chinese Taipei) Chia-Jung Chuang / (China) Yan Zi (semifinals)
3. (Russia) Alisa Kleybanova / (Russia) Ekaterina Makarova (semifinals)
4. (Poland) Klaudia Jans / (Poland) Alicja Rosolska (quarterfinals)

== Draw ==
=== Key ===
- Q = Qualifier
- WC = Wild card
- LL = Lucky loser
- Alt = Alternate
- SE = Special exempt
- PR = Protected ranking
- ITF = ITF entry
- JE = Junior exempt
- w/o = Walkover
- r = Retired
- d = Defaulted
- SR = Special ranking

=== Draw ===
First round
1	(Germany) A-L Grönefeld (Slovenia) K Srebotnik	6	7
(China) J Lu (China) S Sun	4	5
(Chinese Taipei) C-W Chan (China) Y-F Xu	1	6^{3}
(United States) C Gullickson (Australia) N Kriz	6	7
3	(Russia) A Kleybanova (Russia) E Makarova	6	7
WC	(South Korea) S-J Kim (South Korea) Y-R Lee	2	5
(South Africa) N Grandin (United States) A Haynes	6	6
(Chinese Taipei) W-h Hsu (Japan) J Namigata	3	4
(Australia) S Ferguson (Japan) A Maekawa	2	2
(Chinese Taipei) Y-j Chan (United States) A Spears	6	6
(Romania) S Cîrstea (United States) M Shaughnessy	2	6	[9]
4	(Poland) K Jans (Poland) A Rosolska	6	4	[11]
(Germany) A Petkovic (Slovakia) M Rybáriková	6	5	[10]
(China) X Han (China) S Zhang	3	7	[6]
(Chinese Taipei) K-C Chang (Chinese Taipei) Y Chen	1	2
2	(Chinese Taipei) C-J Chuang (China) Z Yan	6	6

Quarterfinals
1	(Germany) A-L Grönefeld (Slovenia) K Srebotnik
(United States) C Gullickson (Australia) N Kriz	w/o
3	(Russia) A Kleybanova (Russia) E Makarova	6	6
(South Africa) N Grandin (United States) A Haynes	3	3
(Chinese Taipei) Y-j Chan (United States) A Spears	6	7
4	(Poland) K Jans (Poland) A Rosolska	3	6^{4}
(Germany) A Petkovic (Slovakia) M Rybáriková	6	3	[10]
2	(Chinese Taipei) C-J Chuang (China) Z Yan	4	6	[12]

Semifinals
(United States) C Gullickson (Australia) N Kriz	6	6
3	(Russia) A Kleybanova (Russia) E Makarova	4	0
(Chinese Taipei) Y-j Chan (United States) A Spears	4	6	[15]
2	(Chinese Taipei) C-J Chuang (China) Z Yan	6	2	[13]

Finals
(United States) C Gullickson (Australia) N Kriz	3	4
(Chinese Taipei) Y-j Chan (United States) A Spears	6	6
