= Ebisu, Shibuya =

Major district of Special ward in Kantō, Japan

Ebisu 恵比寿
- Major district of Special ward
- Location of Ebisu in Tokyo

- Coordinates: 35°38′48.12″N 139°42′36.44″E
- Country: Japan
- Region: Kantō
- Prefecture: Tokyo
- Ward: Shibuya
- Time zone: UTC+9 (Japan Standard Time)

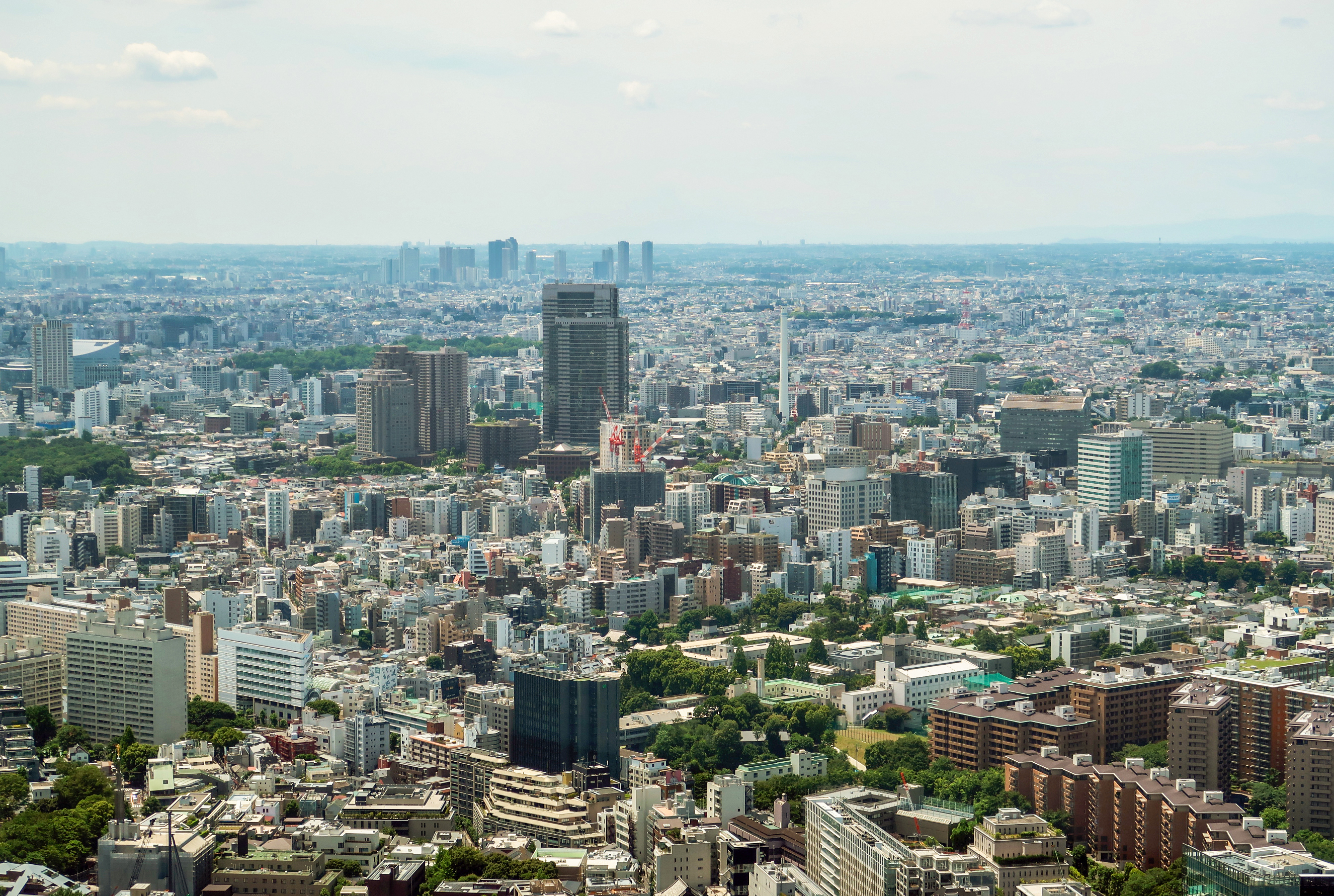
View overlooking Ebisu from the Roppongi Hills

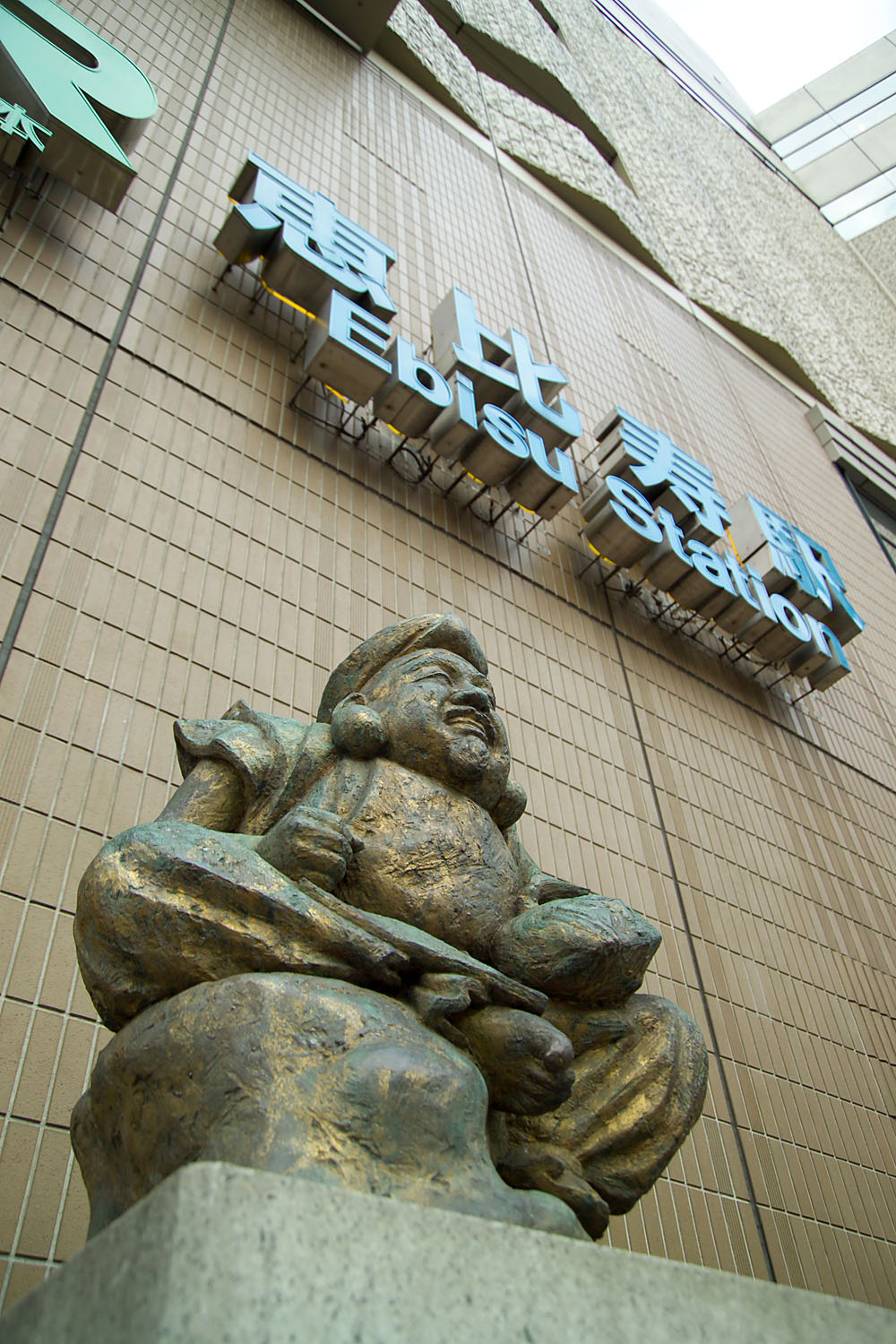
Statue of Ebisu in front of Ebisu Station

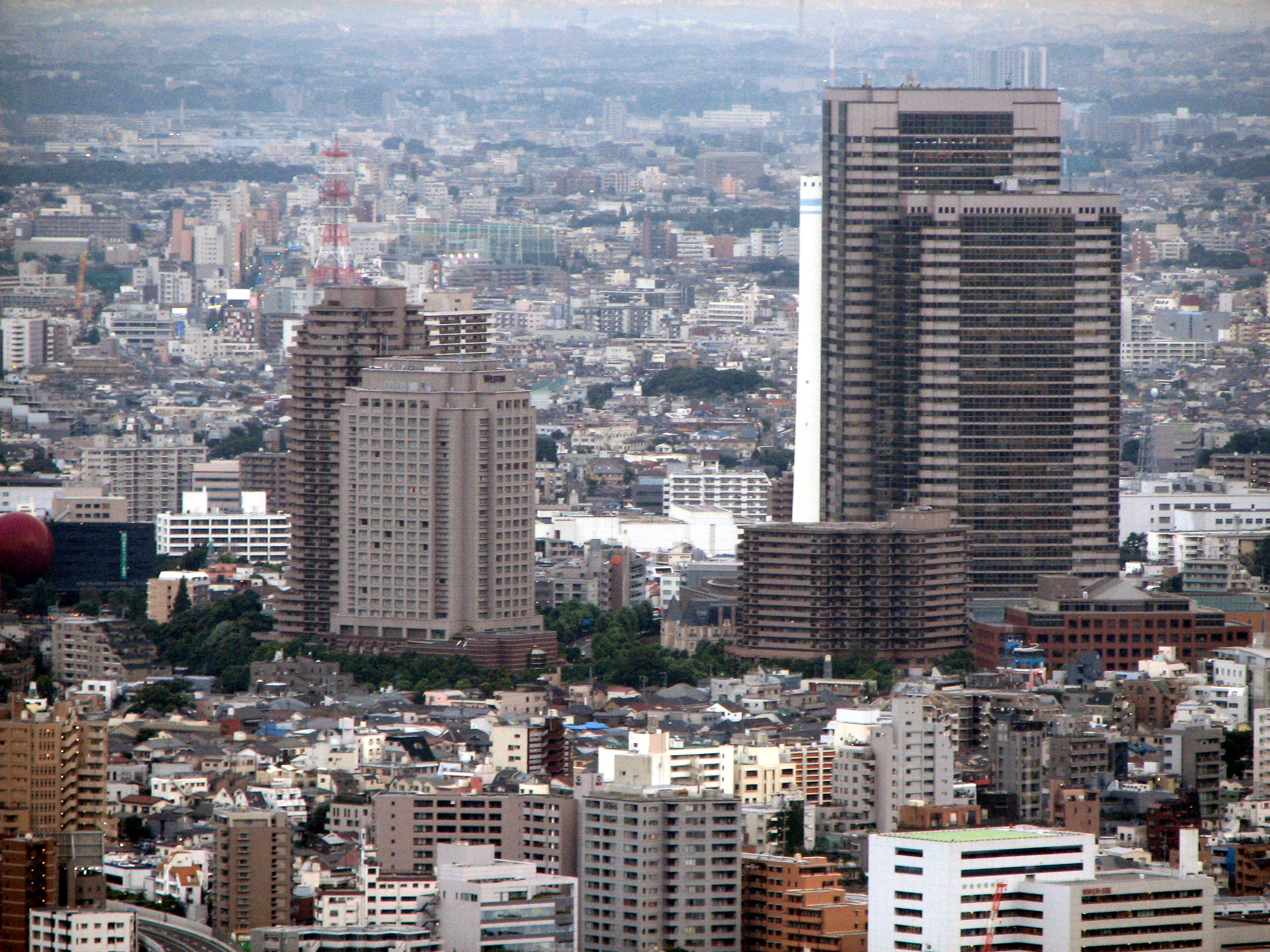
Yebisu Garden Place as seen from Tokyo Tower

Ebisu (恵比寿; Japanese pronunciation: [é̞.bʲì.sɨ̀] (Note: The name of the Ebisu nation and placenames are pronounced like this. The name of the god Ebisu is pronounced [è̞.bʲí.sɨ́] instead.)) is the southernmost part of Shibuya ward in Tokyo, Japan, and a major district of the ward. It was developed on the site of a former brewery, which it is named after, and is home to Yebisu Garden Place. It has a high concentration of bars and restaurants.

== Geography and transportation ==
Ebisu is a major district and neighborhood of the special ward of Shibuya. It is the southernmost part of Shibuya, north of Meguro ward. Ebisu is accessed by the JR Yamanote Line and Tokyo Metro Hibiya Line via Ebisu Station.

== History ==
Ebisu was founded around 1928 as a community developed around the Japan Beer Brewery Company (now Sapporo Breweries Limited) facilities which began brewing Yebisu Beer in 1890.

After the breweries were moved to Chiba in 1988, the area underwent a major urban development resulting in the construction of Yebisu Garden Place, which opened to the public in 1994. Following the construction of Yebisu Garden Place in 1994, the area around Ebisu Station developed rapidly.

The district and railway station of Ebisu takes its name from the Yebisu Beer brand, which in turn was named after Ebisu (one of the Japanese Seven lucky gods). The spelling "Yebisu" is intentionally archaic. With or without the "y" the pronunciation is the same as "Ebisu".

== Sightseeing and attractions ==
=== Food and drink ===
Ebisu has a high concentration of restaurants, cafés, izakaya, ramen shops, bars and old-fashioned tachinomi ("stand and drink") bars. The district is also known for its international nightlife scene, hosting events such as English and Japanese improvisational theatre.

=== Yebisu Garden Place ===
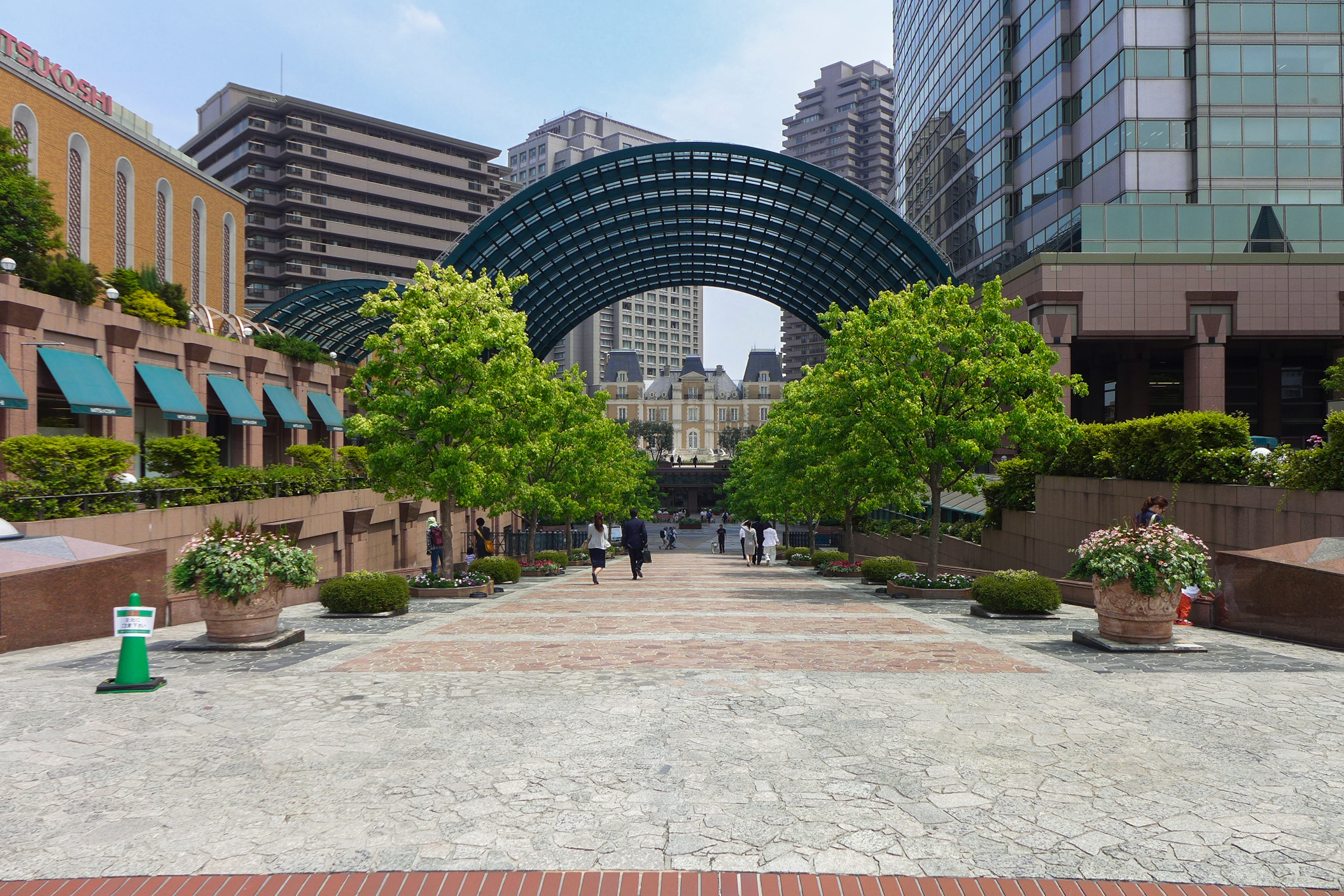
Yebisu Garden Place

Yebisu Garden Place is a shopping and cultural center located in Ebisu. It has a sloped promenade leading to a large central plaza covered by a wide glass arch. The area regularly hosts events and markets on weekends.

It is accessible via the Ebisu Skywalk (a fast-moving covered walkway) from JR Ebisu Station East Exit, which takes approximately 5 minutes on foot.

The complex contains the following attractions:

- Sapporo Breweries headquarters
- Museum of Yebisu Beer
- Tokyo Metropolitan Museum of Photography
- Château Restaurant Joël Robuchon, a replica of a Louis XVI French château, which houses three Michelin-starred restaurants (L'Atelier de Joël Robuchon - 2 stars, La Table de Joël Robuchon - 2 stars, and Le Chateau de Joël Robuchon - 3 stars)
- Yebisu Garden Place Tower, a skyscraper with "sky dining" restaurants on the top 38th and 39th floors with panoramic views over Tokyo
- Atre shopping arcade
- Glass Square, a self-enclosed shopping centre
- Mitsukoshi department store

Yebisu Garden Place offers one of the most popular winter illumination events in Tokyo, holding it annually for over 20 years. The entrance pavilion, sloped promenade, and central square are decorated with about 100,000 gold LED lights. In the central square, a Baccarat crystal chandelier which has 8,500 crystal pieces and 250 lights is hung during the event. At 5 meters tall and 3 meters wide, it is one of the largest chandeliers in the world. Its creation required the work of 13 Meilleur Ouvrier de France (MOF) craftsmen.

== Businesses ==
The magazine The Diplomat has its headquarters in the Ebisu MF Building.

== Education ==
Shibuya Board of Education operates public elementary and junior high schools. Ebisu 4-chome, 1-chome 11-12, 20-26, and 32-35 ban, 2-chome 9-10 ban, and 3-chome 1, 4-42, 44, and 46-49-ban are zoned to Kakezuka Elementary School (加計塚小学校). Ebisu 1-chome 29-31 ban, 2-chome 1-8 ban and 11-39 ban, and 3-chome 2-3, 43, and 45-ban are zoned to Rinsen Elementary School (臨川小学校). Ebisu 1-chome 1-10, 13-19, and 27-28 ban are zoned to Hiroo Elementary School (広尾小学校). All of Ebisu (1-4 chome) is zoned to Hiroo Junior High School (広尾中学校).
