= 2008 Hansol Korea Open – Singles =

Singles
- 2008 Hansol Korea Open

Final
- Champion: (Russia) Maria Kirilenko
- Runner-up: (Australia) Samantha Stosur
- Score: 2–6, 6–1, 6–4

Details
- Draw: 32
- Seeds: 8

Events
Singles	Doubles
← 2007 ·	Korea Open	· 2009 →

Venus Williams was the defending champion, but chose not to participate that year.

Maria Kirilenko won in the final 2–6, 6–1, 6–4, against Samantha Stosur.

== Seeds ==
1. (Russia) Maria Kirilenko (champion)
2. (Israel) Shahar Pe'er (quarterfinals)
3. (Estonia) Kaia Kanepi (semifinals)
4. (Spain) Carla Suárez Navarro (first round)
5. (France) Pauline Parmentier (quarterfinals)
6. (Poland) Marta Domachowska (first round)
7. (New Zealand) Marina Erakovic (first round)
8. (Chinese Taipei) Chan Yung-jan (second round)

== Draw ==
=== Key ===
- Q = Qualifier
- WC = Wild card
- LL = Lucky loser
- Alt = Alternate
- SE = Special exempt
- PR = Protected ranking
- ITF = ITF entry
- JE = Junior exempt
- w/o = Walkover
- r = Retired
- d = Defaulted
- SR = Special ranking

=== Finals ===
Semifinals
1	(Russia) Maria Kirilenko	6	3	6
3	(Estonia) Kaia Kanepi	4	6	4
(Australia) Samantha Stosur	6	6
(United States) Jill Craybas	0	1

Final
1	(Russia) Maria Kirilenko	2	6	6
(Australia) Samantha Stosur	6	1	4

=== Top half ===
First round
1	(Russia) M Kirilenko	6	6
(Slovakia) L Wienerová	2	0
(Czech Republic) L Šafářová	6	3
LL	(United Kingdom) M South	1	0	r
Q	(Canada) S Dubois	6	3	7
(France) C Pin	4	6	5
WC	(South Korea) S-h Han	1	1
5	(France) P Parmentier	6	6
3	(Estonia) K Kanepi	6	6^{5}	6
Q	(Japan) R Fujiwara	2	7	0
Q	(Russia) A Pivovarova	6^{5}	6	5
WC	(South Korea) Y-r Lee	7	3	3^{r}
(Slovakia) M Rybáriková	3	6^{1}
(Belgium) Y Wickmayer	6	7
(Italy) M Santangelo	6	3	4
8	(Chinese Taipei) Y-j Chan	1	6	6

Second round
1	(Russia) M Kirilenko	6	6
(Czech Republic) L Šafářová	3	3
Q	(Canada) S Dubois	3	2
5	(France) P Parmentier	6	6
3	(Estonia) K Kanepi	6	6
Q	(Russia) A Pivovarova	1	1
(Belgium) Y Wickmayer	6	7
8	(Chinese Taipei) Y-j Chan	3	6^{2}

Quarterfinals
1	(Russia) M Kirilenko	6	6
5	(France) P Parmentier	3	2
3	(Estonia) K Kanepi	6	6
(Belgium) Y Wickmayer	1	4

Semifinals
1	(Russia) M Kirilenko	6	3	6
3	(Estonia) K Kanepi	4	6	4

=== Bottom half ===
First round
7	(New Zealand) M Erakovic	2	0
(Australia) S Stosur	6	6
(Russia) V Dushevina	1	0
(Germany) S Lisicki	6	6
(Austria) T Paszek	1	2
(Russia) E Makarova	6	6
(Czech Republic) K Zakopalová	6	6^{3}	6
4	(Spain) C Suárez Navarro	1	7	4
6	(Poland) M Domachowska	7	3	3
(Uzbekistan) A Amanmuradova	6^{1}	6	6
LL	(China) M Yuan	0	0
(United States) J Craybas	6	6
Q	(Japan) A Morita	6	6
WC	(Netherlands) A Rus	4	1
(Czech Republic) P Cetkovská	3	4
2	(Israel) S Pe'er	6	6

Second round
(Australia) S Stosur	6	6^{4}	6
(Germany) S Lisicki	4	7	3
(Russia) E Makarova	6	6
(Czech Republic) K Zakopalová	3	2
(Uzbekistan) A Amanmuradova	6^{1}	2
(United States) J Craybas	7	6
Q	(Japan) A Morita	4	5
2	(Israel) S Pe'er	6	7

Quarterfinals
(Australia) S Stosur	6	6
(Russia) E Makarova	3	4
(United States) J Craybas	6	7
2	(Israel) S Pe'er	2	5

Semifinals
(Australia) S Stosur	6	6
(United States) J Craybas	0	1
