= 2010 Korea Open =

- Date: 20–26 September
- Edition: 7th
- Category: WTA International
- Draw: 32S / 16D
- Prize money: $220,000
- Surface: Hard / outdoor
- Location: Seoul, South Korea
- Venue: Seoul Olympic Park Tennis Center

Champions

Singles
- (Russia) Alisa Kleybanova

Doubles
- (Germany) Julia Görges / (Slovenia) Polona Hercog
← 2009 ·	Korea Open	· 2011 →

The 2010 Korea Open was a women's tennis tournament played on outdoor hard courts. It was the 7th edition of the Korea Open, and was part of the WTA International category of the 2010 WTA Tour. It took place at the Seoul Olympic Park Tennis Center in Seoul, South Korea, from 20 September through 26 September 2010. Fifth-seeded Alisa Kleybanova won the singles title.

== Finals ==
=== Singles ===
(Russia) Alisa Kleybanova defeated (Czech Republic) Klára Zakopalová, 6–1, 6–3

- It was Kleybanova's second and singles title of the year and of her career.

=== Doubles ===
(Germany) Julia Görges / (Slovenia) Polona Hercog defeated (South Africa) Natalie Grandin / (Czech Republic) Vladimíra Uhlířová, 6–3, 6–4

== Entrants ==
Country	Player	Rank^{1}	Seed
RUS	Nadia Petrova	19	1
RUS	Anastasia Pavlyuchenkova	20	2
RUS	Maria Kirilenko	24	3
ESP	María José Martínez Sánchez	25	4
RUS	Alisa Kleybanova	29	5
KAZ	Yaroslava Shvedova	36	6
SRB	Ana Ivanovic	37	7
HUN	Ágnes Szávay	38	8

- ^{1} Seeds are based on the rankings of 13 September, but are subjected to change.

=== Other entrants ===
The following players received wildcards into the singles main draw:

- (Serbia) Ana Ivanovic
- (South Korea) Kim So-jung
- (Russia) Dinara Safina

The following players received entry from the qualifying draw:

- (Romania) Simona Halep
- (Chinese Taipei) Hsieh Su-wei
- (Serbia) Bojana Jovanovski
- (Japan) Junri Namigata
