= 2007 Hansol Korea Open – Singles =

Singles
- 2007 Hansol Korea Open

Final
- Champion: (United States) Venus Williams
- Runner-up: (Russia) Maria Kirilenko
- Score: 6–3, 1–6, 6–4

Details
- Draw: 32
- Seeds: 8

Events
Singles	Doubles
← 2006 ·	Korea Open	· 2008 →

Eleni Daniilidou was the defending champion but lost to Maria Kirilenko in the semifinals.
Venus Williams won in the final 6–3, 1–6, 6–4 against Maria Kirilenko.

== Seeds ==
1. (United States) Venus Williams (champion)
2. (Hungary) Ágnes Szávay (quarterfinals)
3. (Japan) Ai Sugiyama (first round)
4. (Russia) Maria Kirilenko (finals)
5. (Greece) Eleni Daniilidou (semifinals)
6. (Germany) Martina Müller (second round)
7. (Japan) Aiko Nakamura (first round)
8. (Japan) Akiko Morigami (first round)

== Draw ==
=== Key ===
- WC - Wildcard
- r - Retired

=== Finals ===
Semifinals
1	(United States) V Williams	6	6
(Italy) F Pennetta	2	2
4	(Russia) M Kirilenko	7	6
5	(Greece) E Daniilidou	5	0

Finals
1	(United States) V Williams	6	1	6
4	(Russia) M Kirilenko	3	6	4

=== Section 1 ===
First round
1	(United States) V Williams	6	6
Q	(United States) A Spears	2	3
(Australia) C Dellacqua	6	3	2
(Thailand) T Tanasugarn	1	6	6
Q	(Poland) M Domachowska	6	6
(Italy) A Brianti	3	2
(France) S Brémond	5	7^{7}	7^{7}
7	(Japan) A Nakamura	7	6^{4}	6^{5}
3	(Japan) A Sugiyama	5	3
(Japan) A Morita	7	6
Q	(Japan) J Namigata	5	2
(France) M Johansson	7	6
(France) P Parmentier	6	6
(Romania) E Gallovits	2	4
(Italy) F Pennetta	6	6
8	(Japan) A Morigami	2	3

Second round
1	(United States) V Williams	6	6
(Thailand) T Tanasugarn	2	1
Q	(Poland) M Domachowska	7	6
(France) S Brémond	5	2
(Japan) A Morita	6	4	6
(France) M Johansson	4	6	4
(France) P Parmentier	4	4
(Italy) F Pennetta	6	6

Quarterfinals
1	(United States) V Williams	6	6
Q	(Poland) M Domachowska	2	3
(Japan) A Morita	1	2
(Italy) F Pennetta	6	6

Semifinals
1	(United States) V Williams	6	6
(Italy) F Pennetta	2	2

=== Section 2 ===
First round
6	(Germany) M Müller	6	6
WC	(South Korea) S-H Han	1	0
(Chinese Taipei) S-W Hsieh	3	2
(Colombia) C Castaño	6	6
(China) M Yuan	6	6
Q	(New Zealand) M Erakovic	4	4
WC	(South Korea) S-J Kim	5	3
4	(Russia) M Kirilenko	7	6
5	(Greece) E Daniilidou	6	6
(Denmark) C Wozniacki	4	4
(United Kingdom) A Keothavong	1	1
(United States) A Rolle	6	6
(Russia) G Voskoboeva	6	6
(France) Y Fedossova	4	1
WC	(South Korea) Y-R Lee	2	3
2	(Hungary) A Szávay	6	6

Second round
6	(Germany) M Müller	4	2
(Colombia) C Castaño	6	6
(China) M Yuan	4	2
4	(Russia) M Kirilenko	6	6
5	(Greece) E Daniilidou	6	6
(United States) A Rolle	3	2
(Russia) G Voskoboeva	1	4
2	(Hungary) A Szávay	6	6

Quarterfinals
(Colombia) C Castaño	3	0
4	(Russia) M Kirilenko	6	6
5	(Greece) E Daniilidou	4	7
2	(Hungary) A Szávay	6	5	r

Semifinals
4	(Russia) M Kirilenko	7	6
5	(Greece) E Daniilidou	5	0
