= 2008 Hansol Korea Open – Doubles =

Doubles
- 2008 Hansol Korea Open

Final
- Champions: (Chinese Taipei) Chuang Chia-jung (Chinese Taipei) Hsieh Su-wei
- Runners-up: (Russia) Vera Dushevina (Russia) Maria Kirilenko
- Score: 6–3, 6–0

Details
- Draw: 16
- Seeds: 4

Events
Singles	Doubles
← 2007 ·	Korea Open	· 2009 →

Chuang Chia-jung and Hsieh Su-wei were the defending champions, and won in the final 6–3, 6–0, against Vera Dushevina and Maria Kirilenko.

== Seeds ==
1. (Chinese Taipei) Chuang Chia-jung / (Chinese Taipei) Hsieh Su-wei (champions)
2. (Russia) Ekaterina Makarova / (Israel) Shahar Pe'er (quarterfinals)
3. (Russia) Vera Dushevina / (Russia) Maria Kirilenko (final)
4. (United States) Jill Craybas / (New Zealand) Marina Erakovic (semifinals)

== Draw ==
=== Key ===
- Q = Qualifier
- WC = Wild card
- LL = Lucky loser
- Alt = Alternate
- SE = Special exempt
- PR = Protected ranking
- ITF = ITF entry
- JE = Junior exempt
- w/o = Walkover
- r = Retired
- d = Defaulted
- SR = Special ranking

=== Draw ===
First round
1	(Chinese Taipei) C-j Chuang (Chinese Taipei) S-w Hsieh	6	6
(Czech Republic) P Cetkovská (Belgium) Y Wickmayer	3	2
(United States) C Fusano (Slovenia) A Klepač	1	5
(France) P Parmentier (France) C Pin	6	7
4	(United States) J Craybas (New Zealand) M Erakovic	6	6
(Romania) IR Olaru (India) S Uberoi	2	4
(Russia) M Kondratieva (France) S Lefèvre	7	1	[10]
(Uzbekistan) A Amanmuradova (Poland) M Domachowska	5	6	[2]
(Chinese Taipei) K-c Chang (Japan) Y Sema	3	2
(Japan) A Morita (Japan) J Namigata	6	6
WC	(South Korea) K-m Chang (South Korea) Y-r Lee	4	3
3	(Russia) V Dushevina (Russia) M Kirilenko	6	6
(Chinese Taipei) C-w Chan (South Africa) N Grandin	7	6
(Austria) T Paszek (Czech Republic) L Šafářová	5	3
(Chinese Taipei) H-c Chan (Chinese Taipei) Y-j Chan	3	3
2	(Russia) E Makarova (Israel) S Pe'er	6	6

Quarterfinals
1	(Chinese Taipei) C-j Chuang (Chinese Taipei) S-w Hsieh	6	6
(France) P Parmentier (France) C Pin	1	4
4	(United States) J Craybas (New Zealand) M Erakovic	6	6
(Russia) M Kondratieva (France) S Lefèvre	3	4
(Japan) A Morita (Japan) J Namigata	0	6	[6]
3	(Russia) V Dushevina (Russia) M Kirilenko	6	4	[10]
(Chinese Taipei) C-w Chan (South Africa) N Grandin	7	2	[10]
2	(Russia) E Makarova (Israel) S Pe'er	6^{4}	6	[6]

Semifinals
1	(Chinese Taipei) C-j Chuang (Chinese Taipei) S-w Hsieh	6	7
4	(United States) J Craybas (New Zealand) M Erakovic	4	5
3	(Russia) V Dushevina (Russia) M Kirilenko	6	6
(Chinese Taipei) C-w Chan (South Africa) N Grandin	4	4

Final
1	(Chinese Taipei) C-j Chuang (Chinese Taipei) S-w Hsieh	6	6
3	(Russia) V Dushevina (Russia) M Kirilenko	3	0
