= 1997 Hopman Cup =

- Date: 29 December 1996 – 4 January 1997
- Edition: IX
- Surface: Hard indoor
- Location: Perth, Western Australia
- Venue: Burswood Entertainment Complex

Champions
- United States
← 1996 ·	Hopman Cup	· 1998 →

The Hopman Cup IX corresponds to the ninth edition of the Hopman Cup tournament between nations in men's and women's tennis. The tournament was played between 29 December 1996 and 4 January 1997 at the Burswood Dome in Perth, Western Australia.

Eight teams competed for the title. Croatia were the 1996 champions but they lost in the group stage. The United States took the title after beating South Africa in the final.
This was the first year that the tournament was sanctioned by the International Tennis Federation.

== Seedings ==
1. Croatia – Goran Ivanišević / Iva Majoli
2. Switzerland – Marc Rosset / Martina Hingis
3. South Africa – Wayne Ferreira / Amanda Coetzer
4. France – Guy Forget / Mary Pierce

== Group A ==
=== Standings ===
Pos.	Country	W	L	Matches	Sets
1	United States	3	0	6-3	13-10
2	Croatia	2	1	6-3	6-7
3	Australia	1	2	4-5	9-11
4	France	0	3	2-7	5-11

=== Australia vs. Croatia ===
Australia
1
Burswood Entertainment Complex, Perth

hard (indoors)

Croatia
2

			1	2	3
1	(Australia) (Croatia)	Nicole Bradtke; Iva Majoli	4; 6	3; 6
2	(Australia) (Croatia)	Mark Philippoussis; Goran Ivanišević	6; 2	6; 3
3	(Australia) (Croatia)	Nicole Bradtke / Mark Philippoussis; Iva Majoli / Goran Ivanišević	5; 7	5; 7

=== France vs. United States ===
France
1
Burswood Entertainment Complex, Perth

hard (indoors)

United States
2

			1	2	3
1	(France) (United States)	Mary Pierce; Chanda Rubin	4; 6	1; 6
2	(France) (United States)	Guy Forget; Justin Gimelstob	2; 6	6; 3	6; 3
3	(France) (United States)	Mary Pierce / Guy Forget; Chanda Rubin / Justin Gimelstob	6; 3	3; 6	2; 6

=== Australia vs. France ===
Australia
2
Burswood Entertainment Complex, Perth

hard (indoors)

France
1

			1	2	3
1	(Australia) (France)	Nicole Bradtke; Mary Pierce	6^{6} 7^{8}	1; 6
2	(Australia) (France)	Mark Philippoussis; Guy Forget	7^{7} 6^{1}	6; 2
3	(Australia) (France)	Nicole Bradtke / Mark Philippoussis; Mary Pierce / Guy Forget	7^{10} 6^{8}	7^{7} 6^{5}

=== Croatia vs. United States ===
Croatia
1
Burswood Entertainment Complex, Perth
2 January 2010, 10:00 AWST (UTC+8)
hard (indoors)

United States
2

			1	2	3
1	(Croatia) (United States)	Iva Majoli; Chanda Rubin	3; 6	6; 3	6^{4} 7^{7}
2	(Croatia) (United States)	Goran Ivanišević; Justin Gimelstob	7^{7} 6^{5}	4; 6	7; 5
3	(Croatia) (United States)	Iva Majoli / Goran Ivanišević; Chanda Rubin / Justin Gimelstob	6; 3	3; 6	6^{8} 7^{10}

=== Australia vs. United States ===
Australia
1
Burswood Entertainment Complex, Perth
2 January 2010, 10:00 AWST (UTC+8)
hard (indoors)

United States
2

			1	2	3
1	(Australia) (United States)	Nicole Bradtke; Chanda Rubin	5; 7	0; 6
2	(Australia) (United States)	Mark Philippoussis; Justin Gimelstob	6^{5} 7^{7}	6; 4	6^{5} 7^{7}
3	(Australia) (United States)	Nicole Bradtke / Mark Philippoussis; Chanda Rubin / Justin Gimelstob	6; 3	7; 5

=== Croatia vs. France ===
Croatia
3
Burswood Entertainment Complex, Perth
2 January 2010, 10:00 AWST (UTC+8)
hard (indoors)

France
0

			1	2	3
1	(Croatia) (France)	Iva Majoli; Mary Pierce	6; 3	6; 4
2	(Croatia) (France)	Goran Ivanišević; Guy Forget				w/o
3	(Croatia) (France)	Iva Majoli / Goran Ivanišević; Mary Pierce / Guy Forget				w/o

== Group B ==
=== Standings ===
Pos.	Country	W	L	Matches	Sets
1	South Africa	3	0	7-2	13-10
2	Switzerland	2	1	6-3	6-7
3	Romania	1	2	5-4	9-9
4	Germany	0	3	0-9	1-18

=== Romania vs. Switzerland ===
Romania
1
Burswood Entertainment Complex, Perth

hard (indoors)

Switzerland
2

			1	2	3
1	(Romania) (Switzerland)	Irina Spîrlea; Martina Hingis	5; 7	2; 6
2	(Romania) (Switzerland)	Adrian Voinea; Marc Rosset				w/o
3	(Romania) (Switzerland)	Irina Spîrlea / Adrian Voinea; Martina Hingis / Marc Rosset	6; 3	5; 7	3; 6

=== Germany vs. South Africa ===
Germany
0
Burswood Entertainment Complex, Perth

hard (indoors)

South Africa
3

			1	2	3
1	(Germany) (South Africa)	Petra Begerow; Amanda Coetzer	0; 6	5; 7
2	(Germany) (South Africa)	Bernd Karbacher; Wayne Ferreira	4; 6	4; 6
3	(Germany) (South Africa)	Petra Begerow / Bernd Karbacher; Amanda Coetzer / Wayne Ferreira	3; 6	4; 6

=== South Africa vs. Switzerland ===
South Africa
2
Burswood Entertainment Complex, Perth

hard (indoors)

Switzerland
1

			1	2	3
1	(South Africa) (Switzerland)	Amanda Coetzer; Martina Hingis	1; 6	2; 6
2	(South Africa) (Switzerland)	Wayne Ferreira; Marc Rosset	6; 0	2; 0		retired
3	(South Africa) (Switzerland)	Amanda Coetzer / Wayne Ferreira; Martina Hingis / Marc Rosset				w/o

=== Germany vs. Romania ===
Germany
0
Burswood Entertainment Complex, Perth
2 January 2010, 10:00 AWST (UTC+8)
hard (indoors)

Romania
3

			1	2	3
1	(Germany) (Romania)	Petra Begerow; Irina Spîrlea	1; 6	3; 6
2	(Germany) (Romania)	Bernd Karbacher; Adrian Voinea	6; 2	6^{5} 7^{7}	2; 6
3	(Germany) (Romania)	Petra Begerow / Bernd Karbacher; Irina Spîrlea / Adrian Voinea	1; 6	1; 6

=== Romania vs. South Africa ===
Romania
1
Burswood Entertainment Complex, Perth

hard (indoors)

South Africa
2

			1	2	3
1	(Romania) (South Africa)	Irina Spîrlea; Amanda Coetzer	5; 7	6; 4	6; 1
2	(Romania) (South Africa)	Adrian Voinea; Wayne Ferreira	6^{9} 7^{11}	6^{5} 7^{7}
3	(Romania) (South Africa)	Irina Spîrlea / Adrian Voinea; Amanda Coetzer / Wayne Ferreira	6; 4	1; 6	4; 6

=== Germany vs. Switzerland ===
Germany
0
Burswood Entertainment Complex, Perth

hard (indoors)

Switzerland
3

			1	2	3
1	(Germany) (Switzerland)	Petra Begerow; Martina Hingis	1; 6	1; 6
2	(Germany) (Switzerland)	Bernd Karbacher; Marc Rosset	6^{4} 7^{7}	6^{5} 7^{7}
3	(Germany) (Switzerland)	Petra Begerow / Bernd Karbacher; Martina Hingis / Marc Rosset	5; 7	1; 6

== Final ==
United States
2
Burswood Entertainment Complex, Perth, Western Australia
4 January 1997
Indoor Hard

South Africa
1

			1	2	3
1	(United States) (South Africa)	Chanda Rubin; Amanda Coetzer	7; 5	6; 2
2	(United States) (South Africa)	Justin Gimelstob; Wayne Ferreira	4; 6	6; 7
3	(United States) (South Africa)	Justin Gimelstob / Chanda Rubin; Wayne Ferreira / Amanda Coetzer	3; 6	6; 2	7; 5

1997 Hopman Cup Champions
(United States)
United States
First title
