= Australia at the Hopman Cup =

Sporting event delegation

Australia
- First year: 1989
- Years played: 31
- Hopman Cup titles: 2 (1999, 2016)
- Runners-up: 2 (1989, 2003)
- Most total wins: Lleyton Hewitt (25–20)
- Most singles wins: Lleyton Hewitt (15–9)
- Most doubles wins: Lleyton Hewitt (10–11); Alicia Molik (10–6)
- Best doubles team: Lleyton Hewitt & Alicia Molik (7–2)
- Most years played: Lleyton Hewitt (8)

Australia is a nation that has competed at each edition of the Hopman Cup tournament since the inaugural event in 1989. Australia won the title in 1999 and 2016, and finished as the runners up in 1989 and 2003.

== Players ==
This is a list of players who have played for Australia in the Hopman Cup.

Name	Total W–L	Singles W–L	Doubles W–L	First year played	No. of years played
Wayne Arthurs	0–2	0–1	0–1	2006	1
Paul Baccanello ^{1}	0–2	0–1	0–1	2005	1
Ashleigh Barty	7–5	4–2	3–3	2013	2
Nicole Bradtke ^{2}	12–8	4–6	8–2	1993	4
Pat Cash	9–4	4–2	5–2	1989	3
Casey Dellacqua	1–11	1–5	0–6	2009	2
Jelena Dokić	5–7	4–3	1–4	1999	2
Matthew Ebden	3–5	1–3	2–2	2015	3
Annabel Ellwood	3–3	1–2	2–1	1998	1
Richard Fromberg	1–5	1–2	0–3	2001	1
Daria Gavrilova	7–12	4–6	3–6	2016	3
Nathan Healey ^{3}	1–1	0–1	1–0	2007	1
Lleyton Hewitt	25–20	15–9	10–11	2002	8
Thanasi Kokkinakis	2–4	2–1	0–3	2018	1
Nick Kyrgios	9–3	6–1	3–2	2016	2
Peter Luczak	2–4	1–2	1–2	2008	1
Hana Mandlíková	6–5	2–3	4–2	1989	2
Wally Masur	6–4	2–3	4–1	1993	2
Marinko Matosevic	1–3	1–1	0–2	2015	1
Rachel McQuillan	0–2	0–2	0–2	1992	1
Benjamin Mitchell	0–1	0–0	0–1	2015	1
Alicia Molik	23–14	13–8	10–6	2002	7
Mark Philippoussis	15–13	9–7	6–6	1996	6
Nicole Pratt	0–6	0–3	0–3	2001	1
Kristine Radford	2–2	0–2	2–0	1995	1
Pat Rafter	5–1	3–0	2–1	1998	1
Todd Reid ^{4}	1–3	0–2	1–1	2006	1
Elizabeth Smylie	1–3	0–2	1–1	1991	1
Sam Stosur	6–12	4–5	2–7	2006	3
Bernard Tomic	4–2	3–0	1–2	2013	1
Jarmila Wolfe ^{5}	5–7	2–4	3–3	2012	2
Todd Woodbridge	0–2	0–1	0–1	1992	2
Mark Woodforde	4–2	2–1	2–1	1990	1

^{1} Baccanello replaced Mark Philippoussis in the 2005 tie against the US after Philippoussis suffered two tears in an adductor muscle in his groin.
^{2} Bradtke competed under her maiden name, Provis, in the first two of her four appearances at the event.
^{3} Healey played Australia's final tie in 2007 against the US after Mark Philippoussis injured his right knee during the tie against France.
^{4} Reid competed in 2006 after being brought in to replace Wayne Arthurs after the first tie as Arthurs had suffered a tear in his calf muscle.
^{5} Wolfe competed under her maiden name, Gajdošová, in her first appearance at the event in 2012.

== Results ==
Year	Competition	Location	Opponent	Score	Result
1989	Round One	Burswood Dome, Perth	Great Britain	2–1	Won
1989	Semifinals	Burswood Dome, Perth	Germany	2–1	Won
1989	Final	Burswood Dome, Perth	Czechoslovakia	0–2	Lost
1990	Round One	Burswood Dome, Perth	Yugoslavia	3–0	Won
1990	Quarterfinals	Burswood Dome, Perth	Soviet Union	3–0	Won
1990	Semifinals	Burswood Dome, Perth	United States	0–3	Lost
1991	Round One	Burswood Dome, Perth	Great Britain	2–1	Won
1991	Quarterfinals	Burswood Dome, Perth	Switzerland	0–3	Lost
1992	Round One	Burswood Dome, Perth	Netherlands	0–3	Lost
1993	Round One	Burswood Dome, Perth	South Africa	3–0	Won
1993	Quarterfinals	Burswood Dome, Perth	Czech Republic	1–2	Lost
1994	Round One	Burswood Dome, Perth	Sweden	2–1	Won
1994	Quarterfinals	Burswood Dome, Perth	France	3–0	Won
1994	Semifinals	Burswood Dome, Perth	Czech Republic	1–2	Lost
1995	Round One	Burswood Dome, Perth	South Africa	2–1	Won
1995	Quarterfinals	Burswood Dome, Perth	Czech Republic	1–2	Lost
1996	Round Robin	Burswood Dome, Perth	Switzerland	1–2	Lost
1996	Round Robin	Burswood Dome, Perth	Germany	1–2	Lost
1996	Round Robin	Burswood Dome, Perth	Netherlands	2–1	Won
1997	Round Robin	Burswood Dome, Perth	Croatia	1–2	Lost
1997	Round Robin	Burswood Dome, Perth	France	2–1	Won
1997	Round Robin	Burswood Dome, Perth	United States	1–2	Lost
1998	Round Robin	Burswood Dome, Perth	Sweden	3–0	Won
1998	Round Robin	Burswood Dome, Perth	Spain	2–1	Won
1998	Round Robin	Burswood Dome, Perth	Slovakia	1–2	Lost
1999	Round Robin	Burswood Dome, Perth	South Africa	1–2	Lost
1999	Round Robin	Burswood Dome, Perth	Spain	3–0	Won
1999	Round Robin	Burswood Dome, Perth	France	2–1	Won
1999	Final	Burswood Dome, Perth	Sweden	2–1	Won
2000 ^{1}	Round Robin	Burswood Dome, Perth	Thailand	1–2	Lost
2000 ^{1}	Round Robin	Burswood Dome, Perth	Austria	2–1	Won
2000 ^{1}	Round Robin	Burswood Dome, Perth	Japan	0–3	Lost
2001	Round Robin	Burswood Dome, Perth	South Africa	1–2	Lost
2001	Round Robin	Burswood Dome, Perth	Switzerland	0–3	Lost
2001	Round Robin	Burswood Dome, Perth	Thailand	0–3	Lost
2002 ^{2}	Round Robin	Burswood Dome, Perth	Switzerland	3–0	Won
2002 ^{2}	Round Robin	Burswood Dome, Perth	Argentina	2–1	Won
2002 ^{2}	Round Robin	Burswood Dome, Perth	Spain	0–3	Lost
2003	Round Robin	Burswood Dome, Perth	Italy	3–0	Won
2003	Round Robin	Burswood Dome, Perth	Slovakia	3–0	Won
2003	Round Robin	Burswood Dome, Perth	Czech Republic	2–1	Won
2003	Final	Burswood Dome, Perth	United States	0–3	Lost
2004 ^{3}	Round Robin	Burswood Dome, Perth	Hungary	3–0	Won
2004 ^{3}	Round Robin	Burswood Dome, Perth	Belgium	3–0	Won
2004 ^{3}	Round Robin	Burswood Dome, Perth	Slovakia	1–2	Lost
2005	Round Robin	Burswood Dome, Perth	Slovakia	2–1	Won
2005	Round Robin	Burswood Dome, Perth	Netherlands	1–2	Lost
2005	Round Robin	Burswood Dome, Perth	United States	1–2	Lost
2006	Round Robin	Burswood Dome, Perth	Germany	1–2	Lost
2006	Round Robin	Burswood Dome, Perth	Netherlands	1–2	Lost
2006	Round Robin	Burswood Dome, Perth	Argentina	2–1	Won
2007	Round Robin	Burswood Dome, Perth	Russia	2–1	Won
2007	Round Robin	Burswood Dome, Perth	France	0–3	Lost
2007	Round Robin	Burswood Dome, Perth	United States	2–1	Won
2008	Round Robin	Burswood Dome, Perth	Czech Republic	2–1	Won
2008	Round Robin	Burswood Dome, Perth	India	1–2	Lost
2008	Round Robin	Burswood Dome, Perth	United States	0–3	Lost
2009	Round Robin	Burswood Dome, Perth	Germany	1–2	Lost
2009	Round Robin	Burswood Dome, Perth	Slovakia	1–2	Lost
2009	Round Robin	Burswood Dome, Perth	United States	1–2	Lost
2010	Round Robin	Burswood Dome, Perth	Romania	1–2	Lost
2010	Round Robin	Burswood Dome, Perth	United States	2–1	Won
2010	Round Robin	Burswood Dome, Perth	Spain	0–3	Lost
2011	Round Robin	Burswood Dome, Perth	Belgium	2–1	Won
2011	Round Robin	Burswood Dome, Perth	Serbia	0–3	Lost
2011	Round Robin	Burswood Dome, Perth	Kazakhstan	3–0	Won
2012	Round Robin	Burswood Dome, Perth	Spain	1–2	Lost
2012	Round Robin	Burswood Dome, Perth	France	0–3	Lost
2012	Round Robin	Burswood Dome, Perth	China	2–1	Won
2013	Round Robin	Perth Arena, Perth	Germany	3–0	Won
2013	Round Robin	Perth Arena, Perth	Serbia	1–2	Lost
2013	Round Robin	Perth Arena, Perth	Italy	2–1	Won
2014	Round Robin	Perth Arena, Perth	Canada	1–2	Lost
2014	Round Robin	Perth Arena, Perth	Italy	1–2	Lost
2014	Round Robin	Perth Arena, Perth	Poland	1–2	Lost
2015	Round Robin	Perth Arena, Perth	Poland	0–3	Lost
2015	Round Robin	Perth Arena, Perth	France	1–2	Lost
2015	Round Robin	Perth Arena, Perth	Great Britain	0–3	Lost
2016 ^{4} Gold	Round Robin	Perth Arena, Perth	Czech Republic	0–3	Lost
2016 ^{4} Gold	Round Robin	Perth Arena, Perth	United States	3–0	Won
2016 ^{4} Gold	Round Robin	Perth Arena, Perth	Ukraine	1–2	Lost
2016 ^{4} Green	Round Robin	Perth Arena, Perth	Germany	3–0	Won
2016 ^{4} Green	Round Robin	Perth Arena, Perth	Great Britain	2–1	Won
2016 ^{4} Green	Round Robin	Perth Arena, Perth	France	2–1	Won
2016 ^{4} Green	Final	Perth Arena, Perth	Ukraine	2–0	Won
2017	Round Robin	Perth Arena, Perth	Spain	1–2	Lost
2017	Round Robin	Perth Arena, Perth	Czech Republic	1–2	Lost
2017	Round Robin	Perth Arena, Perth	United States	1–2	Lost
2018	Round Robin	Perth Arena, Perth	Canada	2–1	Won
2018	Round Robin	Perth Arena, Perth	Belgium	0–3	Lost
2018	Round Robin	Perth Arena, Perth	Germany	1–2	Lost
2019	Round Robin	Perth Arena, Perth	France	2–1	Won
2019	Round Robin	Perth Arena, Perth	Spain	2–1	Won
2019	Round Robin	Perth Arena, Perth	Germany	1–2	Lost

^{1} Two of the losses in the final tie against Japan were walkovers, as a result of Mark Philippoussis not being able to compete in either the singles or the mixed doubles.
^{2} Australia was forced to forfeit the entire tie against Spain as Lleyton Hewitt was diagnosed with chickenpox.
^{3} In the final tie against Slovakia, Alicia Molik had to retire during her singles match and forfeit the doubles match due to a foot injury. Despite this, they finished top of their group but because of Molik's injury, did not compete in the final.
^{4} Australia was represented by two teams for that year's competition.

== Australia mixed team at the United Cup ==
=== 2023 ===
Australia participated in the inaugural edition of the 2023 United Cup tournament as hosts. They were paired with Great Britain and Spain in Group D, hosted in Sydney. Number one ranked ATP player, Nick Kyrgios pulled out on the eve of the competition due to injury and the number one ranked WTA player, Ajla Tomljanovic whilst still on the team list, was unable to compete in the event, also due to a knee injury. Neither player would then go on to play the 2023 Australian Open as a consequence of those injuries.

Australia's first match was against Great Britain, which they lost 2–3.

After Great Britain went on to defeat Spain, Australia then beat Spain in the final tie of the Group in which neither team could advance to the knockout stages. Australia won the tie 3–2, notably with Alex de Minaur beating Rafael Nadal in the first match of the tie.

=== 2024 ===
For the second edition of the Cup, the format changed to three rubbers per tie instead of five. This included one men's singles, one women's singles and a mixed doubles match. Australia announced their team on 19 October 2023, with Alex De Minaur and Ajla Tomljanovic their top rated singles players. Other members of the squad included John Millman, Matt Ebden, Storm Hunter and Ellen Perez.

Australia was drawn to play in Perth in Group C, once again facing Great Britain as well as defending champions United States. In a very difficult group, Australia lost their first tie against Great Britain 1–2 with Storm Hunter and Matt Ebden winning their mixed doubles rubber. In the tie against the United States, Alex De Minaur won his singles match against Taylor Fritz and Ajla Tomljanovic lost her match against Jessica Pegula, thus resulting in a decisive doubles match. Australia were victorious in straight sets, progressing to the knockout stage as a result of superior sets won percentage as all three teams were equal on ties won and matches won.

Australia progressed comfortably through their quarterfinals tie, defeating Serbia 3–0, with De Minaur recording a straight sets win over world number 5, Novak Djokovic. Tomljanovic also recorded a straight sets win in her singles match as did the doubles pairing of Hunter and Ebden. Australia then travelled to Sydney for the semifinals stage of the tournament. They were drawn against Germany, after the Germans defeated Greece 2–1 in their corresponding quarterfinal tie. Tomljanovic lost to former world number 1, Angelique Kerber in an epic three set match, losing the tie-breaker 9–7 after having two match points herself. De Minaur then dispatched Alexander Zverev in three sets, after losing the first set. The doubles match produced a very tight affair with the first two sets going to tie-breaks, with each winning one set. This resulted in a marathon 28 point match break, with Germany being the victors (15–13).

=== Players ===
Player	Years played	First year	Ties	Win–loss record		Total record		
Player	Years played	First year	Ties	Singles	Doubles	P	W–L	%
Alex de Minaur	1	2023	2	1–1	—	2	1–1	50%
Jason Kubler	1	2023	2	2–0	—	2	2–0	100%
Maddison Inglis	1	2023	2	0–2	—	2	0–2	0%
Zoe Hives	1	2023	1	0–1	—	1	0–1	0%
Samantha Stosur	1	2023	2	—	2–0	2	2–0	100%
John Peers	1	2023	2	—	2–0	2	2–0	100%
Olivia Gadecki	1	2023	1	0–1	—	1	0–1	0%

=== Results ===
Year	Result	Round	Date	Surface	Location	Opponent	Score
2023	Group Stage	Group D	29–30 Dec	Hard	Ken Rosewall Arena, Sydney	Great Britain	2–3
2023	Group Stage	Group D	2–3 Jan	Hard	Ken Rosewall Arena, Sydney	Spain	3–2
2024	Semi-finals	Group C	29 Dec	Hard	RAC Arena, Perth	Great Britain	1–2
2024	Semi-finals	Group C	1 Jan	Hard	RAC Arena, Perth	United States	2–1
2024	Semi-finals	QF	3 Jan	Hard	RAC Arena, Perth	Serbia	3–0
2024	Semi-finals	SF	6 Jan	Hard	Ken Rosewall Arena, Sydney	Germany	1–2
