= South Africa at the Hopman Cup =

Sporting event delegation

South Africa
- First year: 1993
- Years played: 10
- Hopman Cup titles: 1 (2000)
- Runners-up: 1 (1997)
- Most total wins: Amanda Coetzer (24–20)
- Most singles wins: Amanda Coetzer (14–9)
- Most doubles wins: Amanda Coetzer (10–11)
- Best doubles team: Amanda Coetzer & Wayne Ferreira (9–10)
- Most years played: Amanda Coetzer (9)

South Africa is a nation that competed at four consecutive Hopman Cup tournaments and first competed in the 5th annual staging in 1993. They won the event in 2000 and were also the runners-up three years earlier in 1997.

== Players ==
This is a list of players who have played for South Africa in the Hopman Cup.

| Name | Total W–L | Singles W–L | Doubles W–L | First year played | No. of years played |
|---|---|---|---|---|---|
| Amanda Coetzer | 24–20 | 14–9 | 10–11 | 1993 | 9 |
| Wayne Ferreira | 20–19 | 11–9 | 9–10 | 1993 | 7 |
| Marcos Ondruska | 1–1 | 0–1 | 1–0 | 1994 | 1 |
| Christo van Rensburg | 0–2 | 0–1 | 0–1 | 1995 | 1 |
| Kevin Anderson | 3–3 | 2–1 | 1–2 | 2013 | 1 |
| Chanelle Scheepers | 2–4 | 1–2 | 1–2 | 2013 | 1 |

== Results ==
| Year | Competition | Location | Opponent | Score | Result |
|---|---|---|---|---|---|
| 1993 | Round One | Burswood Dome, Perth | Australia | 0–3 | Lost |
| 1994 | Round One | Burswood Dome, Perth | Germany | 1–2 | Lost |
| 1995 | Round One | Burswood Dome, Perth | Australia | 1–2 | Lost |
| 1996 | Round Robin | Burswood Dome, Perth | United States | 1–2 | Lost |
| 1996 | Round Robin | Burswood Dome, Perth | France | 1–2 | Lost |
| 1996 | Round Robin | Burswood Dome, Perth | Croatia | 2–1 | Won |
| 1997 ^{1} | Round Robin | Burswood Dome, Perth | Germany | 3–0 | Won |
| 1997 ^{1} | Round Robin | Burswood Dome, Perth | Switzerland | 2–1 | Won |
| 1997 ^{1} | Round Robin | Burswood Dome, Perth | Romania | 2–1 | Won |
| 1997 ^{1} | Final | Burswood Dome, Perth | United States | 1–2 | Lost |
| 1998 | Round Robin | Burswood Dome, Perth | United States | 2–1 | Won |
| 1998 | Round Robin | Burswood Dome, Perth | Germany | 2–1 | Won |
| 1998 | Round Robin | Burswood Dome, Perth | France | 0–3 | Lost |
| 1999 ^{2} | Round Robin | Burswood Dome, Perth | Australia | 2–1 | Won |
| 1999 ^{2} | Round Robin | Burswood Dome, Perth | France | 1–2 | Lost |
| 1999 ^{2} | Round Robin | Burswood Dome, Perth | Zimbabwe | 2–1 | Won |
| 2000 | Round Robin | Burswood Dome, Perth | Belgium | 3–0 | Won |
| 2000 | Round Robin | Burswood Dome, Perth | Sweden | 2–1 | Won |
| 2000 | Round Robin | Burswood Dome, Perth | United States | 1–2 | Lost |
| 2000 | Final | Burswood Dome, Perth | Thailand | 3–0 | Won |
| 2001 | Round Robin | Burswood Dome, Perth | Australia | 2–1 | Won |
| 2001 | Round Robin | Burswood Dome, Perth | Thailand | 2–1 | Won |
| 2001 | Round Robin | Burswood Dome, Perth | Switzerland | 1–2 | Lost |
| 2013 | Round Robin | Perth Arena, Perth | Spain | 1–2 | Lost |
| 2013 | Round Robin | Perth Arena, Perth | United States | 1–2 | Lost |
| 2013 | Round Robin | Perth Arena, Perth | France | 2–1 | Won |

^{1} In the 1997 tie against Switzerland, South Africa's two points came as a result of the male Swiss competitor, Marc Rosset, withdrawing from his singles match and being unable to compete in the mixed doubles due to injury.
^{2} In the 1999 tie against Zimbabwe, the South African team conceded one point as a result of their choice not to compete in the mixed doubles.
