= Japan at the Hopman Cup =

Sporting event delegation

Japan
- First year: 1989
- Years played: 5
- Best finish: Round One (1989, 1992, 1993)
- Most total wins: Kimiko Date (2–2); Ai Sugiyama (2–3); Takao Suzuki (2–2)
- Most singles wins: Kimiko Date (2–0)
- Most doubles wins: Ai Sugiyama (1–1); Takao Suzuki (1–1)
- Best doubles team: Ai Sugiyama & Takao Suzuki (1–1)
- Most years played: Kimiko Date (2); Ai Sugiyama (2); Takao Suzuki (2); Yasufumi Yamamoto (2)

Japan is a nation that has competed at the Hopman Cup tournament on five occasions, the first being at the inaugural annual staging in 1989. Before the introduction of the round robin competition format in 1996, Japan never passed the first round and since its introduction, the nation has never passed the qualification stage of the tournament.

Japan also participated in the first two stagings of the now defunct Asian Hopman Cup, a qualifying tournament which ran from 2006 until 2009 and granted the winners entry into the Hopman Cup the following year. In both 2006 and 2007, Japan failed to progress past the round robin stage of the event, thus failing to gain entry into the main tournament in Australia.

== Players ==
This is a list of players who have played for Japan in the Hopman Cup.

Name	Total W–L	Singles W–L	Doubles W–L	First year played	No. of years played
Kimiko Date	2–2	2–0	0–2	1992	2
Shuzo Matsuoka	1–1	1–0	0–1	1989	1
Naomi Osaka	1–3	1–1	0–2	2018	1
Yūichi Sugita	1–4	1–2	0–2	2018	1
Ai Sugiyama	2–3	1–2	1–1	2000	2
Takao Suzuki	2–2	1–1	1–1	2000	2
Yasufumi Yamamoto	0–4	0–2	0–2	1992	2
Masako Yanagi	0–2	0–1	0–1	1989	1

== Results ==
Year	Competition	Location	Opponent	Score	Result
1989	Round One	Burswood Dome, Perth	Czechoslovakia	1–2	Lost
1992	Round One	Burswood Dome, Perth	Czechoslovakia	1–2	Lost
1993	Round One	Burswood Dome, Perth	Switzerland	1–2	Lost
2000 ^{1}	Qualification Play-Off	Burswood Dome, Perth	Thailand	1–2	Lost
2000 ^{1}	Round Robin	Burswood Dome, Perth	Australia	3–0	Won
2001	Qualification Play-Off	Burswood Dome, Perth	Belgium	1–2	Lost
2018	Round Robin	Perth Arena, Perth	Switzerland	0–3	Lost
2018	Round Robin	Perth Arena, Perth	United States	1–2	Lost
2018	Round Robin	Perth Arena, Perth	Russia	1–2	Lost

^{1} Despite losing the qualification play-off in 2000, the Japanese team replaced the injured Belgium team for the tie against Australia. In this tie, Australian opponent Mark Philippoussis was unable to play either of his matches, thus defaulting two points to Japan.
