= 2000 Hopman Cup =

Tennis tournament

- Date: 1 January – 8 January 2000
- Edition: XII
- Surface: Hard indoor
- Location: Perth, Western Australia
- Venue: Burswood Entertainment Complex

Champions
- South Africa
← 1999 ·	Hopman Cup	· 2001 →

The 2000 Hopman Cup (also known as the Hyundai Hopman Cup for sponsorship reasons) corresponds to the 12th edition of the Hopman Cup tournament between nations in men's and women's tennis. Nine teams participated in the World Group.

The 2000 Hopman Cup was a tennis championship won by South Africa's Amanda Coetzer and Wayne Ferreira. Coetzer and Ferreira defeated Thailand (Tamarine Tanasugarn and Paradorn Srichaphan) in the final at the Burswood Entertainment Complex in Perth, Western Australia from 1 January through 8 January 2000.

== Teams ==
1. South Africa – Amanda Coetzer and Wayne Ferreira (champions)
2. Thailand – Tamarine Tanasugarn and Paradorn Srichaphan (finalists)
3. Sweden – Åsa Carlsson and Jonas Björkman
4. United States – Alexandra Stevenson and James Blake
5. Belgium – Dominique Van Roost and Xavier Malisse
6. Austria – Barbara Schett and Stefan Koubek
7. Australia – Jelena Dokić and Mark Philippoussis
8. Slovakia – Henrieta Nagyová and Karol Kučera (qualified)
9. Japan – Ai Sugiyama and Takao Suzuki (lost play-off)

== Play-off ==
=== Thailand vs. Japan ===
Thailand
2
Burswood Entertainment Complex, Perth
January 2000
hard (indoors)

Japan
1

			1	2	3
1	(Thailand) (Japan)	Tamarine Tanasugarn; Ai Sugiyama	6; 1	6; 3
2	(Thailand) (Japan)	Paradorn Srichaphan; Takao Suzuki	6; 3	7^{7} 6^{2}
3	(Thailand) (Japan)	Tamarine Tanasugarn / Paradorn Srichaphan; Ai Sugiyama / Takao Suzuki	3; 6	4; 6

== Group A ==
=== Standings ===
Pos.	Country	W	L	Matches	Sets	Notes
1	Thailand	2	1	6 – 3	12 – 9	Qualified to Group Stage by beating Japan in the Play-Off
2	Austria	2	1	5 – 4	13 – 9	
3	Australia	1	2	3 – 6	7 – 14	Played final tie against Japan
4	Slovakia	0	2	1 – 5	5 – 11	Replaced by Japan for final tie against Australia
5	Japan	N / A				Lost in qualification to Thailand, but replaced Slovakia against Australia

=== Austria vs. Slovakia ===
Austria
2
Burswood Entertainment Complex, Perth
January 2000
hard (indoors)

Slovakia
1

			1	2	3
1	(Austria) (Slovakia)	Barbara Schett; Henrieta Nagyová	6; 2	6; 3
2	(Austria) (Slovakia)	Stefan Koubek; Karol Kučera	6; 4	0; 6	3; 6
3	(Austria) (Slovakia)	Barbara Schett / Stefan Koubek; Henrieta Nagyová / Karol Kučera	6; 2	3; 6	6; 3

=== Thailand vs. Australia ===
Thailand
2
Burswood Entertainment Complex, Perth
January 2000
hard (indoors)

Australia
1

			1	2	3
1	(Thailand) (Australia)	Tamarine Tanasugarn; Jelena Dokić	6; 1	6; 4
2	(Thailand) (Australia)	Paradorn Srichaphan; Mark Philippoussis	1; 6	4; 6
3	(Thailand) (Australia)	Tamarine Tanasugarn / Paradorn Srichaphan; Jelena Dokić / Mark Philippoussis	3; 6	6; 3	6; 4

=== Australia vs. Austria ===
Australia
2
Burswood Entertainment Complex, Perth
January 2000
hard (indoors)

Austria
1

			1	2	3
1	(Australia) (Austria)	Jelena Dokić; Barbara Schett	1; 6	6; 2	7; 5
2	(Australia) (Austria)	Mark Philippoussis; Stefan Koubek	6; 3	3; 6	6; 1
3	(Australia) (Austria)	Jelena Dokić / Mark Philippoussis; Barbara Schett / Stefan Koubek	5; 7	3; 6

=== Thailand vs. Slovakia ===
Thailand
3
Burswood Entertainment Complex, Perth
January 2000
hard (indoors)

Slovakia
0

			1	2	3
1	(Thailand) (Slovakia)	Tamarine Tanasugarn; Henrieta Nagyová	6; 2	2; 6	4; 1	retired
2	(Thailand) (Slovakia)	Paradorn Srichaphan; Karol Kučera	4; 6	7; 6	6; 2
3	(Thailand) (Slovakia)	Tamarine Tanasugarn / Paradorn Srichaphan; Henrieta Nagyová / Karol Kučera				w/o

=== Austria vs. Thailand ===
Austria
2
Burswood Entertainment Complex, Perth
January 2000
hard (indoors)

Thailand
1

			1	2	3
1	(Austria) (Thailand)	Barbara Schett; Tamarine Tanasugarn	7^{7} 6^{2}	3; 6	3; 6
2	(Austria) (Thailand)	Stefan Koubek; Paradorn Srichaphan	6; 3	6; 1
3	(Austria) (Thailand)	Barbara Schett / Stefan Koubek; Tamarine Tanasugarn / Paradorn Srichaphan	8; 7

=== Japan (replacing Slovakia) vs. Australia ===
Japan
3
Burswood Entertainment Complex, Perth
January 2000
hard (indoors)

Australia
0

			1	2	3
1	(Japan) (Australia)	Ai Sugiyama; Jelena Dokić	6; 4	6; 3
2	(Japan) (Australia)	Takao Suzuki; Mark Philippoussis				w/o
3	(Japan) (Australia)	Ai Sugiyama / Takao Suzuki; Jelena Dokić / Mark Philippoussis				w/o

== Group B ==
=== Standings ===
Pos.	Country	W	L	Matches	Sets
1	South Africa	2	1	6 – 3	13 – 6
2	Sweden	2	1	6 – 3	12 – 6
3	United States	1	2	3 – 6	8 – 14
4	Belgium	1	2	3 – 6	7 – 14

=== South Africa vs. Belgium ===
South Africa
3
Burswood Entertainment Complex, Perth
January 2000
hard (indoors)

Belgium
0

			1	2	3
1	(South Africa) (Belgium)	Amanda Coetzer; Dominique Van Roost	6; 4	6; 2
2	(South Africa) (Belgium)	Wayne Ferreira; Xavier Malisse	6; 2	6; 3
3	(South Africa) (Belgium)	Amanda Coetzer / Wayne Ferreira; Dominique Van Roost / Xavier Malisse	7; 5	6; 3

=== Sweden vs. United States ===
Sweden
3
Burswood Entertainment Complex, Perth
January 2000
hard (indoors)

United States
0

			1	2	3
1	(Sweden) (United States)	Åsa Carlsson; Alexandra Stevenson	6; 4	6; 4
2	(Sweden) (United States)	Jonas Björkman; James Blake	6; 3	7; 5
3	(Sweden) (United States)	Åsa Carlsson / Jonas Björkman; Alexandra Stevenson / James Blake	6; 3	6; 3

=== South Africa vs. Sweden ===
South Africa
2
Burswood Entertainment Complex, Perth
January 2000
hard (indoors)

Sweden
1

			1	2	3
1	(South Africa) (Sweden)	Amanda Coetzer; Åsa Carlsson	6; 4	6; 0
2	(South Africa) (Sweden)	Wayne Ferreira; Jonas Björkman	6; 4	6; 4
3	(South Africa) (Sweden)	Amanda Coetzer / Wayne Ferreira; Åsa Carlsson / Jonas Björkman	6^{3} 7^{7}	3; 6

=== United States vs. Belgium ===
United States
1
Burswood Entertainment Complex, Perth
January 2000
hard (indoors)

Belgium
2

			1	2	3
1	(United States) (Belgium)	Alexandra Stevenson; Dominique Van Roost	6; 4	1; 6	6; 4
2	(United States) (Belgium)	James Blake; Xavier Malisse	6^{3} 7^{7}	6; 3	3; 6
3	(United States) (Belgium)	Alexandra Stevenson / James Blake; Dominique Van Roost / Xavier Malisse	4; 6	6; 3	2; 6

=== South Africa vs. United States ===
South Africa
1
Burswood Entertainment Complex, Perth
January 2000
hard (indoors)

United States
2

			1	2	3
1	(South Africa) (United States)	Amanda Coetzer; Alexandra Stevenson	6; 3	6; 1
2	(South Africa) (United States)	Wayne Ferreira; James Blake	4; 6	4; 6
3	(South Africa) (United States)	Amanda Coetzer / Wayne Ferreira; Alexandra Stevenson / James Blake	7^{7} 6^{5}	3; 6	2; 6

=== Belgium vs. Sweden ===
Belgium
1
Burswood Entertainment Complex, Perth
January 2000
hard (indoors)

Sweden
2

			1	2	3
1	(Belgium) (Sweden)	Dominique Van Roost; Åsa Carlsson	6; 2	6; 3
2	(Belgium) (Sweden)	Xavier Malisse; Jonas Björkman	4; 6	3; 6
3	(Belgium) (Sweden)	Dominique Van Roost / Xavier Malisse; Åsa Carlsson / Jonas Björkman	1; 6	5; 7

== Final ==
=== South Africa vs. Thailand ===
South Africa
3
Burswood Entertainment Complex, Perth
8 January 2000
hard (indoors)

Thailand
0

			1	2	3
1	(South Africa) (Thailand)	Amanda Coetzer; Tamarine Tanasugarn	3; 6	6; 4	6; 4
2	(South Africa) (Thailand)	Wayne Ferreira; Paradorn Srichaphan	7; 6	6; 3
3	(South Africa) (Thailand)	Amanda Coetzer / Wayne Ferreira; Tamarine Tanasugarn / Paradorn Srichaphan	8; 1

2000 Hopman Cup Champions
(South Africa)
South Africa
First title
