= United States at the Hopman Cup =

Sporting event delegation

United States of America
- First year: 1990
- Years played: 30
- Hopman Cup titles: 6 (1997, 2003, 2004, 2006, 2008, 2011)
- Runners-up: 6 (1990, 1991, 2001, 2002, 2015, 2017)
- Most total wins: James Blake (23-11)
- Most singles wins: James Blake (11–6)
- Most doubles wins: James Blake (12–5)
- Best doubles team: Jan-Michael Gambill & Monica Seles (6–2)
- Most years played: James Blake; John Isner; Serena Williams (5)

The United States has appeared at the Hopman Cup from the 2nd staging of the event in 1990. The United States has appeared in twelve Hopman Cup finals and have a record six victories. It is one of two countries to successfully defend the title (alongside Switzerland) and holds the record for consecutive final appearances at four.

== Players ==
This is a list of players who have played for the United States in the Hopman Cup.

Name	Total W–L	Singles W–L	Doubles W–L	First year played	No. of years played
James Blake	23–11	11–6	12–5	2000	5
Lindsay Davenport	12–4	6–2	6–2	1995	3
Taylor Dent	6–2	3–1	3–1	2006	1
Victoria Duval	2–3	0–2	2–1	2016	1
Mary Joe Fernández	2–2	1–1	1–1	1993	2
Mardy Fish	8–10	5–4	3–6	2007	3
Amy Frazier	0–2	0–1	0–1	1992	1
Jan-Michael Gambill	13–9	6–5	7–4	1999	3
Zina Garrison	3–3	2–1	1–2	1991	1
Justin Gimelstob	4–4	1–3	3–1	1997	1
Ashley Harkleroad	0–5	0–3	0–2	2007	1
John Isner	18–10	7–7	11–3	2010	5
Ivan Lendl	1–1	0–1	1–0	1994	1
Bethanie Mattek-Sands	6–7	4–3	2–4	2011	2
John McEnroe	5–1	2–1	3–0	1990	1
Melanie Oudin	3–3	1–2	2–1	2010	1
Lisa Raymond	3–5	0–4	3–1	2006	1
Richey Reneberg	4–4	1–3	3–1	1995	2
Derrick Rostagno	1–1	1–0	0–1	1992	1
Chanda Rubin	13–7	7–3	6–4	1996	3
Monica Seles	12–4	6–2	6–2	2001	2
Meghann Shaughnessy^{1}	5–9	2–5	3–4	2005	3
Pam Shriver	4–1	1–1	3–0	1990	1
Jack Sock	11–9	5–5	6–4	2016	3
Jonathan Stark	2–4	1–2	1–2	1998	1
Sloane Stephens	3–1	2–0	1–1	2014	1
Alexandra Stevenson	2–4	1–2	1–2	2000	1
Frances Tiafoe	0−6	0−3	0−3	2019	1
Coco Vandeweghe	9–5	5–2	4–3	2017	2
MaliVai Washington	0–2	0–1	0–1	1993	1
David Wheaton	2–4	1–2	1–2	1991	1
Serena Williams	21–7	11–3	10–4	2003	5
Venus Williams	5–0	3–0	2–0	2013	1

^{1} Shaughnessy represented the USA in the 2005 and 2009 competitions and also stood in for an ill Serena Williams in the 2008 tie against India.

== Results ==
Year	Competition	Location	Opponent	Score	Result
1989	Did not participate				
1990	Quarterfinals	Burswood Dome, Perth	Italy	3–0	Won
1990	Semifinals	Burswood Dome, Perth	Australia	2–0	Won
1990	Final	Burswood Dome, Perth	Spain	1–2	Runner-up
1991	Quarterfinals	Burswood Dome, Perth	Czechoslovakia	2–1	Won
1991	Semifinals	Burswood Dome, Perth	Switzerland	2–1	Won
1991	Final	Burswood Dome, Perth	Yugoslavia	0–3	Runner-up
1992	Quarterfinals	Burswood Dome, Perth	Czechoslovakia	1–2	Lost
1993	Quarterfinals	Burswood Dome, Perth	France	1–2	Lost
1994	Quarterfinals	Burswood Dome, Perth	Germany	1–2	Lost
1995	Quarterfinals	Burswood Dome, Perth	Ukraine	1–2	Lost
1996	Round Robin	Burswood Dome, Perth	South Africa	2–1	Won
1996	Round Robin	Burswood Dome, Perth	Croatia	1–2	Lost
1996	Round Robin	Burswood Dome, Perth	France	2–1	Won
1997	Round Robin	Burswood Dome, Perth	France	2–1	Won
1997	Round Robin	Burswood Dome, Perth	Croatia	2–1	Won
1997	Round Robin	Burswood Dome, Perth	Australia	2–1	Won
1997	Final	Burswood Dome, Perth	South Africa	2–1	Champion
1998	Round Robin	Burswood Dome, Perth	South Africa	1–2	Lost
1998	Round Robin	Burswood Dome, Perth	France	0–3	Lost
1998	Round Robin	Burswood Dome, Perth	Germany	2–1	Won
1999	Round Robin	Burswood Dome, Perth	Sweden	1–2	Lost
1999	Round Robin	Burswood Dome, Perth	Switzerland	1–2	Lost
1999	Round Robin	Burswood Dome, Perth	Slovakia	3–0	Won
2000	Round Robin	Burswood Dome, Perth	Sweden	0–3	Lost
2000	Round Robin	Burswood Dome, Perth	Belgium	1–2	Lost
2000	Round Robin	Burswood Dome, Perth	South Africa	2–1	Won
2001	Round Robin	Burswood Dome, Perth	Slovakia	3–0	Won
2001	Round Robin	Burswood Dome, Perth	Russia	2–1	Won
2001	Round Robin	Burswood Dome, Perth	Belgium	3–0	Won
2001	Final	Burswood Dome, Perth	Switzerland	1–2	Runner-up
2002	Round Robin	Burswood Dome, Perth	France	3–0	Won
2002	Round Robin	Burswood Dome, Perth	Italy	1–2	Lost
2002	Round Robin	Burswood Dome, Perth	Belgium	2–1	Won
2002	Final	Burswood Dome, Perth	Spain	1–2	Runner-up
2003	Round Robin	Burswood Dome, Perth	Uzbekistan	3–0	Won
2003	Round Robin	Burswood Dome, Perth	Spain	3–0	Won
2003	Round Robin	Burswood Dome, Perth	Belgium	2–1	Won
2003	Final	Burswood Dome, Perth	Australia	3–0	Champion
2004	Round Robin	Burswood Dome, Perth	Czech Republic	3–0	Won
2004	Round Robin	Burswood Dome, Perth	France	3–0	Won
2004	Round Robin	Burswood Dome, Perth	Russia	3–0	Won
2004	Final	Burswood Dome, Perth	Slovakia	2–1	Champion
2005	Round Robin	Burswood Dome, Perth	Netherlands	2–1	Won
2005	Round Robin	Burswood Dome, Perth	Slovakia	1–2	Lost
2005	Round Robin	Burswood Dome, Perth	Australia	2–1	Won
2006	Round Robin	Burswood Dome, Perth	Serbia	2–1	Won
2006	Round Robin	Burswood Dome, Perth	Russia	2–1	Won
2006	Round Robin	Burswood Dome, Perth	Sweden	1–2	Lost
2006	Final	Burswood Dome, Perth	Netherlands	2–1	Champion
2007	Round Robin	Burswood Dome, Perth	France	1–2	Lost
2007	Round Robin	Burswood Dome, Perth	Russia	1–2	Lost
2007	Round Robin	Burswood Dome, Perth	Australia	1–2	Won
2008	Round Robin	Burswood Dome, Perth	India	2–1	Won
2008	Round Robin	Burswood Dome, Perth	Czech Republic	3–0	Won
2008	Round Robin	Burswood Dome, Perth	Australia	3–0	Won
2008	Final	Burswood Dome, Perth	Serbia	2–1	Champion
2009	Round Robin	Burswood Dome, Perth	Slovakia	0–3	Lost
2009	Round Robin	Burswood Dome, Perth	Germany	1–2	Lost
2009	Round Robin	Burswood Dome, Perth	Australia	2–1	Won
2010	Round Robin	Burswood Dome, Perth	Spain	0–3	Lost
2010	Round Robin	Burswood Dome, Perth	Australia	1–2	Lost
2010	Round Robin	Burswood Dome, Perth	Romania	3–0	Won
2011	Round Robin	Burswood Dome, Perth	France	3–0	Won
2011	Round Robin	Burswood Dome, Perth	Italy	2–1	Won
2011	Round Robin	Burswood Dome, Perth	Great Britain	2–1	Won
2011	Final	Burswood Dome, Perth	Belgium	2–1	Champion
2012	Round Robin	Burswood Dome, Perth	Denmark	1–2	Lost
2012	Round Robin	Burswood Dome, Perth	Czech Republic	0–3	Lost
2012	Round Robin	Burswood Dome, Perth	Bulgaria	1–2	Lost
2013	Round Robin	Perth Arena, Perth	South Africa	2–1	Won
2013	Round Robin	Perth Arena, Perth	France	2–1	Won
2013	Round Robin	Perth Arena, Perth	Spain	0–3	Lost
2014	Round Robin	Perth Arena, Perth	Spain	3–0	Won
2014	Round Robin	Perth Arena, Perth	France	1–2	Lost
2014	Round Robin	Perth Arena, Perth	Czech Republic	0–3	Lost
2015	Round Robin	Perth Arena, Perth	Italy	3–0	Won
2015	Round Robin	Perth Arena, Perth	Canada	1–2	Lost
2015	Round Robin	Perth Arena, Perth	Czech Republic	3–0	Won
2015	Final	Perth Arena, Perth	Poland	1–2	Runner-up
2016	Round Robin	Perth Arena, Perth	Ukraine	1–2	Lost
2016	Round Robin	Perth Arena, Perth	Australia	0–3	Lost
2016	Round Robin	Perth Arena, Perth	Czech Republic	2–1	Won
2017	Round Robin	Perth Arena, Perth	Czech Republic	3–0	Won
2017	Round Robin	Perth Arena, Perth	Spain	3–0	Won
2017	Round Robin	Perth Arena, Perth	Australia	2–1	Won
2017	Final	Perth Arena, Perth	France	1–2	Runner-up
2018	Round Robin	Perth Arena, Perth	Russia	2–1	Won
2018	Round Robin	Perth Arena, Perth	Japan	2–1	Won
2018	Round Robin	Perth Arena, Perth	Switzerland	0–3	Lost
2019	Round Robin	Perth Arena, Perth	Greece	1–2	Lost
2019	Round Robin	Perth Arena, Perth	Switzerland	1–2	Lost
2019	Round Robin	Perth Arena, Perth	Great Britain	1–2	Lost
2020–22	No competition				
2023	Did not participate				
2024	No competition				
2025	Did not participate				
