= Belgium at the Hopman Cup =

Sporting event delegation

Belgium
- First year: 2000
- Years played: 8
- Runners-up: 1 (2011)
- Most total wins: Kim Clijsters (13–10)
- Most singles wins: Kim Clijsters (7–5)
- Most doubles wins: Xavier Malisse (6–4); Kim Clijsters (6–5)
- Best doubles team: Kim Clijsters & Xavier Malisse (5–2)
- Most years played: Kim Clijsters (4); Xavier Malisse (4)

Belgium is a nation that has competed at eight Hopman Cup tournaments and first competed in the 12th Hopman Cup in 2000. Belgium has been the runner-up on one occasion, in 2011, when they finished second in their group but after Serbia's withdrawal from the final due to an abdominal injury sustained by Ana Ivanovic, they were promoted to face USA in the final.

== Players ==
This is a list of players who have played for Belgium in the Hopman Cup.

Name	Total W–L	Singles W–L	Doubles W–L	First year played	No. of years played
Ruben Bemelmans	3–5	1–3	2–2	2011	1
Kim Clijsters	13–10	7–5	6–5	2001	4
David Goffin	4–4	2–2	2–2	2018	2
Justine Henin	6–2	4–0	2–2	2011	1
Xavier Malisse	12–10	6–6	6–4	2000	4
Elise Mertens	5–3	3–1	2–2	2018	2
Olivier Rochus	2–6	1–3	1–3	2001	1
Dominique Van Roost	2–4	1–2	1–2	2000	1

== Results ==
Year	Competition	Location	Opponent	Score	Result
2000	Round Robin	Burswood Dome, Perth	South Africa	0–3	Lost
2000	Round Robin	Burswood Dome, Perth	United States	2–1	Won
2000	Round Robin	Burswood Dome, Perth	Sweden	2–1	Lost
2001	Qualification Play-Off	Burswood Dome, Perth	Japan	2–1	Won
2001	Round Robin	Burswood Dome, Perth	Russia	2–1	Won
2001	Round Robin	Burswood Dome, Perth	Slovakia	1–2	Lost
2001	Round Robin	Burswood Dome, Perth	United States	0–3	Lost
2002	Round Robin	Burswood Dome, Perth	Italy	2–1	Won
2002	Round Robin	Burswood Dome, Perth	France	2–1	Won
2002	Round Robin	Burswood Dome, Perth	United States	1–2	Lost
2003	Round Robin	Burswood Dome, Perth	Spain	2–1	Won
2003	Round Robin	Burswood Dome, Perth	Uzbekistan	3–0	Won
2003	Round Robin	Burswood Dome, Perth	United States	1–2	Lost
2004 ^{1}	Round Robin	Burswood Dome, Perth	Slovakia	3–0	Won
2004 ^{1}	Round Robin	Burswood Dome, Perth	Australia	0–3	Lost
2011 ^{2}	Round Robin	Burswood Dome, Perth	Australia	1–2	Lost
2011 ^{2}	Round Robin	Burswood Dome, Perth	Kazakhstan	3–0	Won
2011 ^{2}	Round Robin	Burswood Dome, Perth	Serbia	2–1	Won
2011 ^{2}	Final	Burswood Dome, Perth	United States	1–2	Lost
2018	Round Robin	Perth Arena, Perth	Germany	1–2	Lost
2018	Round Robin	Perth Arena, Perth	Australia	3–0	Won
2018	Round Robin	Perth Arena, Perth	Canada	3–0	Won
2023	Round Robin	Nice Lawn Tennis Club, Nice	Croatia	1–2	Lost
2023	Round Robin	Nice Lawn Tennis Club, Nice	Spain	2–1	Won

^{1} Due to an ankle injury sustained by Kim Clijsters during her singles match, Belgium was forced to give Australia a walkover in the mixed doubles and were also unable to play their final tie of 2004.
^{2} Belgium actually finished second in their group in 2011 but were promoted to the final after group leaders, Serbia, were unable to compete.
