= Russia at the Hopman Cup =

Sporting event delegation

Russia
- First year: 2001
- Years played: 7
- Hopman Cup titles: 1 (2007)
- Runners-up: 1 (2009)
- Most total wins: Marat Safin (9–15)
- Most singles wins: Marat Safin (5–7)
- Most doubles wins: Marat Safin (4–8)
- Best doubles team: Nadia Petrova & Dmitry Tursunov (3–0)
- Most years played: Marat Safin (4)

Russia is a nation that has competed at the Hopman Cup tournament on seven occasions, their first appearance coming at the 13th annual staging of the event in 2001. They have won the tournament on one occasion, in 2007, and were the runners up two years later in 2009.

Before its dissolution, Russia used to form part of the Soviet Union which also competed at the Hopman Cup on two occasions in the early 1990s. Additionally, Russia is a member of the CIS which entered a team into the 1992 event.

== Players ==
This is a list of players who have played for Russia in the Hopman Cup.

| Name | Total W–L | Singles W–L | Doubles W–L | First year played | No. of years played |
|---|---|---|---|---|---|
| Igor Andreev | 2–4 | 1–2 | 1–2 | 2010 | 1 |
| Elena Dementieva | 3–3 | 2–1 | 1–2 | 2010 | 1 |
| Karen Khachanov | 3–3 | 1–2 | 2–1 | 2018 | 1 |
| Svetlana Kuznetsova | 4–2 | 3–0 | 1–2 | 2006 | 1 |
| Elena Likhovtseva | 2–4 | 0–3 | 2–1 | 2001 | 1 |
| Anastasia Myskina | 1–5 | 4–2 | 0–6 | 2004 | 2 |
| Anastasia Pavlyuchenkova | 2–4 | 0–3 | 2–1 | 2018 | 1 |
| Nadia Petrova | 6–1 | 3–1 | 3–0 | 2007 | 1 |
| Marat Safin | 9–15 | 5–7 | 4–8 | 2001 | 4 |
| Dinara Safina | 5–2 | 3–1 | 2–1 | 2009 | 1 |
| Yuri Schukin | 1–5 | 0–3 | 1–2 | 2006 | 1 |
| Dmitry Tursunov | 5–2 | 2–2 | 3–0 | 2007 | 1 |

== Results ==
| Year | Competition | Location | Opponent | Score | Result |
|---|---|---|---|---|---|
| 2001 | Round Robin | Burswood Dome, Perth | Belgium | 1–2 | Lost |
| 2001 | Round Robin | Burswood Dome, Perth | United States | 1–2 | Lost |
| 2001 | Round Robin | Burswood Dome, Perth | Slovakia | 2–1 | Won |
| 2004 | Round Robin | Burswood Dome, Perth | France | 1–2 | Lost |
| 2004 | Round Robin | Burswood Dome, Perth | Czech Republic | 2–1 | Won |
| 2004 | Round Robin | Burswood Dome, Perth | United States | 0–3 | Lost |
| 2005 | Round Robin | Burswood Dome, Perth | Germany | 1–2 | Lost |
| 2005 | Round Robin | Burswood Dome, Perth | Argentina | 1–2 | Lost |
| 2005 | Round Robin | Burswood Dome, Perth | Italy | 1–2 | Lost |
| 2006 | Round Robin | Burswood Dome, Perth | United States | 1–2 | Lost |
| 2006 | Round Robin | Burswood Dome, Perth | Sweden | 2–1 | Won |
| 2006 | Round Robin | Burswood Dome, Perth | Serbia | 1–2 | Lost |
| 2007 ^{1} | Round Robin | Burswood Dome, Perth | Australia | 1–2 | Lost |
| 2007 ^{1} | Round Robin | Burswood Dome, Perth | United States | 2–1 | Won |
| 2007 ^{1} | Round Robin | Burswood Dome, Perth | France | 3–0 | Won |
| 2007 ^{1} | Final | Burswood Dome, Perth | Spain | 2–0 | Won |
| 2009 ^{2} | Round Robin | Burswood Dome, Perth | Italy | 2–1 | Won |
| 2009 ^{2} | Round Robin | Burswood Dome, Perth | Chinese Taipei | 2–1 | Won |
| 2009 ^{2} | Round Robin | Burswood Dome, Perth | France | 2–1 | Won |
| 2009 ^{2} | Final | Burswood Dome, Perth | Slovakia | 0–2 | Lost |
| 2010 | Round Robin | Burswood Dome, Perth | Germany | 2–1 | Won |
| 2010 | Round Robin | Burswood Dome, Perth | Kazakhstan | 1–2 | Lost |
| 2010 | Round Robin | Burswood Dome, Perth | Great Britain | 1–2 | Lost |
| 2018 | Round Robin | Perth Arena, Perth | United States | 1–2 | Lost |
| 2018 | Round Robin | Perth Arena, Perth | Switzerland | 0–3 | Lost |
| 2018 | Round Robin | Perth Arena, Perth | Japan | 2–1 | Won |

^{1} In the 2007 final against Spain, the mixed doubles dead rubber was not played.
^{2} In the 2009 final against Slovakia, the mixed doubles dead rubber was not played.

== See also ==
- CIS at the Hopman Cup
- Soviet Union at the Hopman Cup
