= Thailand at the Hopman Cup =

Sporting event delegation

Thailand
- First year: 2000
- Years played: 2
- Runners-up: 1 (2000)
- Most total wins: Tamarine Tanasugarn (7–8)
- Most singles wins: Tamarine Tanasugarn (5–3)
- Most doubles wins: Tamarine Tanasugarn (2–5); Paradorn Srichaphan (2–5)
- Best doubles team: Tamarine Tanasugarn & Paradorn Srichaphan (2–5)
- Most years played: Tamarine Tanasugarn (2); Paradorn Srichaphan (2)

Thailand is a nation that has competed at the Hopman Cup tournament on two occasions. The nation's first appearance came in 2000, when they won the qualification play-off and went on to reach the final, eventually finishing as the runners-up. This remains their best performance to date.

Thailand also participated a number of times in the now defunct Asian Hopman Cup, a qualifying tournament which ran from 2006 until 2009 and granted the winners entry into the Hopman Cup the following year. In 2006, 2008 and 2009 Thailand failed to progress past the round robin stage of the event but in 2007 they hosted the event and finished as the runners-up to Chinese Taipei.

== Players ==
This is a list of players who have played for Thailand in the Hopman Cup.

Name	Total W–L	Singles W–L	Doubles W–L	First year played	No. of years played
Paradorn Srichaphan	6–9	4–4	2–5	2000	2
Tamarine Tanasugarn	7–8	5–3	2–5	2000	2

== Results ==
Year	Competition	Location	Opponent	Score	Result
2000 ^{1}	Qualification Play-Off	Burswood Dome, Perth	Japan	2–1	Won
2000 ^{1}	Round Robin	Burswood Dome, Perth	Australia	2–1	Won
2000 ^{1}	Round Robin	Burswood Dome, Perth	Slovakia	3–0	Won
2000 ^{1}	Round Robin	Burswood Dome, Perth	Austria	1–2	Lost
2000 ^{1}	Final	Burswood Dome, Perth	South Africa	0–3	Lost
2001	Round Robin	Burswood Dome, Perth	Switzerland	0–3	Lost
2001	Round Robin	Burswood Dome, Perth	South Africa	1–2	Lost
2001	Round Robin	Burswood Dome, Perth	Australia	3–0	Won

^{1} In the 2000 tie against Slovakia, the female Slovak competitor, Henrieta Nagyová, was forced to retire during the singles match and was also unable to play the mixed doubles match. This conceded two points to Thailand and helped towards their eventual 3–0 victory over Slovakia.
