= Czechoslovakia at the Hopman Cup =

Sporting event delegation

Czechoslovakia
- First year: 1989
- Years played: 4
- Hopman Cup titles: 1 (1989)
- Runners-up: 1 (1992)
- Most total wins: Helena Suková (15–3)
- Most singles wins: Helena Suková (6–3)
- Most doubles wins: Helena Suková (9–0)
- Best doubles team: Helena Suková & Karel Nováček (4–0)
- Most years played: Helena Suková (3)

Czechoslovakia is a nation that competed at four consecutive Hopman Cup tournaments and first competed in the inaugural Hopman Cup in 1989, winning the event. This was their only time winning the event, but they did finish as the runners-up in 1992.

Since the peaceful split of Czechoslovakia into the Czech Republic and Slovakia at the start of 1993, both new nations have competed in the Hopman Cup.

== Players ==
This is a list of players who have played for Czechoslovakia in the Hopman Cup.

Name	Total W–L	Singles W–L	Doubles W–L	First year played	No. of years played
Petr Korda	6–2	2–2	4–0	1990	2
Miloslav Mečíř	3–2	0–2	3–0	1989	1
Karel Nováček	5–3	1–3	4–0	1992	1
Regina Rajchrtová	2–2	0–2	2–0	1991	1
Helena Suková	15–3	6–3	9–0	1989	3

== Results ==
Year	Competition	Location	Opponent	Score	Result
1989 ^{1}	Round One	Burswood Dome, Perth	Japan	2–1	Won
1989 ^{1}	Semifinals	Burswood Dome, Perth	Sweden	2–1	Won
1989 ^{1}	Final	Burswood Dome, Perth	Australia	2–0	Won
1990	Quarterfinals	Burswood Dome, Perth	France	3–0	Won
1990	Semifinals	Burswood Dome, Perth	Spain	1–2	Lost
1991	First Round	Burswood Dome, Perth	Germany	2–1	Won
1991	Quarterfinals	Burswood Dome, Perth	United States	1–2	Lost
1992	First Round	Burswood Dome, Perth	Japan	2–1	Won
1992	Quarterfinals	Burswood Dome, Perth	United States	2–1	Won
1992	Semifinals	Burswood Dome, Perth	Germany	2–1	Won
1992	Final	Burswood Dome, Perth	Switzerland	1–2	Lost

^{1} The men's singles dead rubber in the final against Australia was not played due to Pat Cash of Australia suffering illness during the mixed doubles.

== See also ==
- Czech Republic at the Hopman Cup
- Slovakia at the Hopman Cup
