= 2002 Hopman Cup =

- Date: 29 December 2001 – 5 January 2002
- Edition: XIV
- Surface: Hard indoor
- Location: Perth, Western Australia
- Venue: Burswood Entertainment Complex

Champions
- Spain
← 2001 ·	Hopman Cup	· 2003 →

The 2002 Hopman Cup (also known as the Hyundai Hopman Cup for sponsorship reasons) was a tennis championship won by Spain's Arantxa Sánchez Vicario and Tommy Robredo. Sánchez Vicario and Robredo defeated the United States (Monica Seles and Jan-Michael Gambill) in the final at the Burswood Entertainment Complex in Perth, Western Australia.

== Play-off ==
=== Italy vs. Greece ===
Italy
2
Burswood Entertainment Complex, Perth, Western Australia
29 December 2001 – 4 January 2002
Hard (indoors)

Greece
1

			1	2	3
1	(Italy) (Greece)	Francesca Schiavone; Eleni Daniilidou	6; 1	6; 2
2	(Italy) (Greece)	Davide Sanguinetti; Vasilis Mazarakis	6; 2	7; 6
3	(Italy) (Greece)	Francesca Schiavone / Davide Sanguinetti; Eleni Daniilidou / Vasilis Mazarakis	6; 4	3; 6	6; 7

== Group A ==
=== Teams and standings ===
Pos.	Country	W	L	Matches	Sets
1.	Spain	3	0	9 – 0	18 – 2
2.	Australia	2	1	5 – 4	11 – 10
3.	Switzerland	1	2	2 – 7	6 – 15
4.	Argentina	0	3	2 – 7	8 – 16

=== Australia vs. Argentina ===
Australia
2
Burswood Entertainment Complex, Perth, Western Australia
29 December 2001 – 4 January 2002
Hard (indoors)

Argentina
1

			1	2	3
1	(Australia) (Argentina)	Alicia Molik; Paola Suárez	6; 7	6; 3	4; 6
2	(Australia) (Argentina)	Lleyton Hewitt; Mariano Zabaleta	6; 3	6; 4
3	(Australia) (Argentina)	Alicia Molik / Lleyton Hewitt; Paola Suárez / Mariano Zabaleta	5; 7	6; 3	10; 7

=== Australia vs. Switzerland ===
Australia
3
Burswood Entertainment Complex, Perth, Western Australia
29 December 2001 – 4 January 2002
Hard (indoors)

Switzerland
0

			1	2	3
1	(Australia) (Switzerland)	Alicia Molik; Miroslava Vavrinec	6; 3	6; 4
2	(Australia) (Switzerland)	Lleyton Hewitt; Roger Federer	6; 3	0; 6	6; 4
3	(Australia) (Switzerland)	Alicia Molik / Lleyton Hewitt; Miroslava Vavrinec / Roger Federer	6; 3	6; 1

=== Spain vs. Argentina ===
Spain
3
Burswood Entertainment Complex, Perth, Western Australia
29 December 2001 – 4 January 2002
Hard (indoors)

Argentina
0

			1	2	3
1	(Spain) (Argentina)	Arantxa Sánchez Vicario; Paola Suárez	6; 2	6; 3
2	(Spain) (Argentina)	Tommy Robredo; Mariano Zabaleta	4; 6	6; 2	6; 3
3	(Spain) (Argentina)	Arantxa Sánchez Vicario / Tommy Robredo; Paola Suárez / Mariano Zabaleta	4; 6	7; 5	7; 6

=== Spain vs. Australia ===
Spain
3
Burswood Entertainment Complex, Perth, Western Australia
29 December 2001 – 4 January 2002
Hard (indoors)

Australia
0

			1	2	3
1	(Spain) (Australia)	Arantxa Sánchez Vicario; Alicia Molik				w/o
2	(Spain) (Australia)	Tommy Robredo; Lleyton Hewitt				w/o
3	(Spain) (Australia)	Arantxa Sánchez Vicario / Tommy Robredo; Alicia Molik / Lleyton Hewitt				w/o

=== Spain vs. Switzerland ===
Spain
3
Burswood Entertainment Complex, Perth, Western Australia
29 December 2001 – 4 January 2002
Hard (indoors)

Switzerland
0

			1	2	3
1	(Spain) (Switzerland)	Arantxa Sánchez Vicario; Miroslava Vavrinec	6; 2	6; 0
2	(Spain) (Switzerland)	Tommy Robredo; Roger Federer	7; 6	6; 2
3	(Spain) (Switzerland)	Arantxa Sánchez Vicario / Tommy Robredo; Miroslava Vavrinec / Roger Federer	6; 2	6; 3

=== Switzerland vs. Argentina ===
Switzerland
2
Burswood Entertainment Complex, Perth, Western Australia
29 December 2001 – 4 January 2002
Hard (indoors)

Argentina
1

			1	2	3
1	(Switzerland) (Argentina)	Miroslava Vavrinec; Paola Suárez	2; 6	6; 3	2; 6
2	(Switzerland) (Argentina)	Roger Federer; Mariano Zabaleta	6; 2	6; 3
3	(Switzerland) (Argentina)	Miroslava Vavrinec / Roger Federer; Paola Suárez / Mariano Zabaleta	6; 3	6; 7	7; 6

== Group B ==
=== Teams and standings ===
Pos.	Country	W	L	Matches	Sets
1.	United States	2	1	6 – 3	13 – 7
2.	Belgium	2	1	5 – 4	13 – 8
3.	Italy	2	1	5 – 4	10 – 9
4.	France	0	3	2 – 7	4 – 16

- Greece did not qualify. The matches where Italy beat them in the qualifying round do not count in these standings.

=== Belgium vs. France ===
Belgium
2
Burswood Entertainment Complex, Perth, Western Australia
29 December 2001 – 4 January 2002
Hard (indoors)

France
1

			1	2	3
1	(Belgium) (France)	Kim Clijsters; Virginie Razzano	6; 3	6; 2
2	(Belgium) (France)	Xavier Malisse; Arnaud Clément	3; 6	6; 3	6; 3
3	(Belgium) (France)	Kim Clijsters / Xavier Malisse; Virginie Razzano / Arnaud Clément	1; 6	6; 3	[6] [10]

=== Belgium vs. Italy ===
Belgium
2
Burswood Entertainment Complex, Perth, Western Australia
29 December 2001 – 4 January 2002
Hard (indoors)

Italy
1

			1	2	3
1	(Belgium) (Italy)	Kim Clijsters; Francesca Schiavone	4; 6	4; 6
2	(Belgium) (Italy)	Xavier Malisse; Davide Sanguinetti	6; 4	7; 5
3	(Belgium) (Italy)	Kim Clijsters / Xavier Malisse; Francesca Schiavone / Davide Sanguinetti	6; 3	6; 4

=== Italy vs. France ===
Italy
2
Burswood Entertainment Complex, Perth, Western Australia
29 December 2001 – 4 January 2002
Hard (indoors)

France
1

			1	2	3
1	(Italy) (France)	Francesca Schiavone; Virginie Razzano	1; 1			retired
2	(Italy) (France)	Davide Sanguinetti; Arnaud Clément	3; 6	5; 7
3	(Italy) (France)	Francesca Schiavone / Davide Sanguinetti; Virginie Razzano / Arnaud Clément				w/o

=== Italy vs. United States ===
Italy
2
Burswood Entertainment Complex, Perth, Western Australia
29 December 2001 – 4 January 2002
Hard (indoors)

United States
1

			1	2	3
1	(Italy) (United States)	Francesca Schiavone; Monica Seles	6; 4	2; 6	6; 4
2	(Italy) (United States)	Davide Sanguinetti; Jan-Michael Gambill	7; 6	6; 3
3	(Italy) (United States)	Francesca Schiavone / Davide Sanguinetti; Monica Seles / Jan-Michael Gambill	3; 6	1; 6

=== United States vs. Belgium ===
United States
2
Burswood Entertainment Complex, Perth, Western Australia
29 December 2001 – 4 January 2002
Hard (indoors)

Belgium
1

			1	2	3
1	(United States) (Belgium)	Monica Seles; Kim Clijsters	4; 6	6; 4	6; 2
2	(United States) (Belgium)	Jan-Michael Gambill; Xavier Malisse	7; 6	7; 6
3	(United States) (Belgium)	Monica Seles / Jan-Michael Gambill; Kim Clijsters / Xavier Malisse	6; 7	2; 6

=== United States vs. France ===
United States
3
Burswood Entertainment Complex, Perth, Western Australia
29 December 2001 – 4 January 2002
Hard (indoors)

France
0

			1	2	3
1	(United States) (France)	Monica Seles; Virginie Razzano	6; 3	6; 4
2	(United States) (France)	Jan-Michael Gambill; Arnaud Clément	6; 4	6; 4
3	(United States) (France)	Monica Seles / Jan-Michael Gambill; Virginie Razzano / Arnaud Clément	6; 1	6; 4

== Final ==
Spain
2
Burswood Entertainment Complex, Perth, Western Australia
5 January 2002
Hard (indoors)

United States
1

			1	2	3
1	(Spain) (United States)	Arantxa Sánchez Vicario; Monica Seles	1; 6	6; 7
2	(Spain) (United States)	Tommy Robredo; Jan-Michael Gambill	6; 3	2; 6	7; 6
3	(Spain) (United States)	Arantxa Sánchez Vicario / Tommy Robredo; Monica Seles / Jan-Michael Gambill	6; 4	6; 2

2002 Hopman Cup Champions
(Spain)
Spain
Second title
