= Slovakia at the Hopman Cup =

Sporting event delegation

Slovakia
- First year: 1998
- Years played: 8
- Hopman Cup titles: 3 (1998, 2005, 2009)
- Runners-up: 1 (2004)
- Most total wins: Dominik Hrbatý (13–10); Karol Kučera (13–13)
- Most singles wins: Dominik Hrbatý (8–5); Karol Kučera (8–6)
- Most doubles wins: Dominik Hrbatý (5–5); Karol Kučera (5–7)
- Best doubles team: Karina Habšudová & Karol Kučera (4–4)
- Most years played: Dominik Hrbatý (4); Karol Kučera (4)

Slovakia is a nation that has competed at the Hopman Cup tournament on eight occasions, first competing at the 10th Hopman Cup in 1998. They have won the title three times: in 1998, 2005 and 2009.

Before its dissolution, Slovakia used to form part of Czechoslovakia which competed at the first four Hopman Cups, from 1989 until 1992.

== Players ==
This is a list of players who have played for Slovakia in the Hopman Cup.

Name	Total W–L	Singles W–L	Doubles W–L	First year played	No. of years played
Dominika Cibulková	6–0	4–0	2–0	2009	1
Karina Habšudová	10–12	5–6	5–6	1998	3
Daniela Hantuchová	8–11	5–6	3–5	2001	3
Dominik Hrbatý	13–10	8–5	5–5	2001	4
Karol Kučera	13–13	8–6	5–7	1998	4
Henrieta Nagyová	0–3	0–2	0–1	2000	1

== Results ==
Year	Competition	Location	Opponent	Score	Result
1998	Qualification Play-Off	Burswood Dome, Perth	Romania	2–1	Won
1998	Round Robin	Burswood Dome, Perth	Spain	1–2	Lost
1998	Round Robin	Burswood Dome, Perth	Sweden	3–0	Won
1998	Round Robin	Burswood Dome, Perth	Australia	2–1	Won
1998	Final	Burswood Dome, Perth	France	2–1	Won
1999	Round Robin	Burswood Dome, Perth	Switzerland	2–1	Won
1999	Round Robin	Burswood Dome, Perth	Sweden	1–2	Lost
1999	Round Robin	Burswood Dome, Perth	United States	0–3	Lost
2000 ^{1}	Round Robin	Burswood Dome, Perth	Austria	2–1	Lost
2000 ^{1}	Round Robin	Burswood Dome, Perth	Thailand	1–2	Lost
2001	Round Robin	Burswood Dome, Perth	United States	2–1	Lost
2001	Round Robin	Burswood Dome, Perth	Belgium	2–1	Won
2001	Round Robin	Burswood Dome, Perth	Russia	1–2	Lost
2003	Round Robin	Burswood Dome, Perth	Czech Republic	1–2	Lost
2003	Round Robin	Burswood Dome, Perth	Australia	0–3	Lost
2003	Round Robin	Burswood Dome, Perth	Italy	3–0	Won
2004 ^{2}	Round Robin	Burswood Dome, Perth	Belgium	0–3	Lost
2004 ^{2}	Round Robin	Burswood Dome, Perth	Hungary	2–1	Won
2004 ^{2}	Round Robin	Burswood Dome, Perth	Australia	2–1	Won
2004 ^{2}	Final	Burswood Dome, Perth	United States	1–2	Lost
2005 ^{3}	Round Robin	Burswood Dome, Perth	Australia	1–2	Lost
2005 ^{3}	Round Robin	Burswood Dome, Perth	United States	2–1	Won
2005 ^{3}	Round Robin	Burswood Dome, Perth	Netherlands	3–0	Won
2005 ^{3}	Final	Burswood Dome, Perth	Argentina	3–0	Won
2009 ^{4}	Round Robin	Burswood Dome, Perth	United States	3–0	Won
2009 ^{4}	Round Robin	Burswood Dome, Perth	Australia	2–1	Won
2009 ^{4}	Round Robin	Burswood Dome, Perth	Germany	3–0	Won
2009 ^{4}	Final	Burswood Dome, Perth	Russia	3–0	Won

^{1} In 2000, Henrieta Nagyová was forced to retire during her singles match in the tie against Thailand and was also unable to compete in the mixed doubles, thus forfeiting both points. Because of this injury, Slovakia was unable to play in their final tie against Australia.
^{2} In the final round robin tie of 2004, Australia had to concede both the women's singles and the mixed doubles to Slovakia due to an injury to Alicia Molik. As group leaders, Australia were also due to play in the final but were unable to following Molik's injury, thus Slovakia was promoted to the final against the United States.
^{3} In the 2005 tie versus the Netherlands, the Netherlands had to forfeit both the men's singles and the mixed doubles due to an injury to the Dutch competitor, Peter Wessels, giving Slovakia a two-point advantage. In the final, after losing the two singles matches, Argentina conceded victory to Slovakia in the mixed doubles dead rubber as a walkover.
^{4} German Nicolas Kiefer was forced to retire in the men's singles versus Slovakia and was unable to compete in the mixed doubles, thus conceding both points to the Slovaks. In the final, after losing both singles matches, Russia chose not to play the dead rubber mixed doubles, thus forfeiting the point to Slovakia.

== See also ==
Czechoslovakia at the Hopman Cup
