= 2004 Hopman Cup =

- Date: 3 January – 10 January 2004
- Edition: XVI
- Surface: Hard (indoor)
- Location: Perth, Western Australia
- Venue: Burswood Entertainment Complex

Champions
- United States
← 2003 ·	Hopman Cup	· 2005 →

The 2004 Hopman Cup (also known as the Hyundai Hopman Cup for sponsorship reasons) was the 16th Hopman Cup tennis tournament held at the Burswood Entertainment Complex in Perth from 3 through 10 January 2004. Slovakia's Daniela Hantuchová and Karol Kučera made the final, but lost to Americans Lindsay Davenport and James Blake.

== Play-off ==
=== Hungary vs. Canada ===
Hungary
2
Burswood Entertainment Complex, Perth
3 January 2004 – 10 January 2004
Hard (indoors)

Canada
1

			1	2	3
1	(Hungary) (Canada)	Petra Mandula; Maureen Drake	6; 3	6; 2
2	(Hungary) (Canada)	Attila Sávolt; Frank Dancevic	4; 6	3; 6
3	(Hungary) (Canada)	Petra Mandula / Attila Sávolt; Maureen Drake / Frank Dancevic	3; 6	6; 1	7; 6

== Group A ==
=== Teams and standings ===
- Czech Republic – Barbora Strýcová and Jiří Novák (Round robin win–loss: 0–3; match win–loss: 2–7; final position: 4)
- France – Amélie Mauresmo and Fabrice Santoro (Round robin win–loss: 2–1; match win–loss: 4–5; final position: 2)
- Russia – Anastasia Myskina and Marat Safin (Round robin win–loss: 1–2; match win–loss: 3–6; final position: 3)
- United States – Lindsay Davenport and James Blake (Round robin win–loss: 3–0; match win–loss: 9–0; final position: 1)

=== France vs. Czech Republic ===
France
2
Burswood Entertainment Complex, Perth
3 January 2004 – 10 January 2004
Hard (indoors)

Czech Republic
1

			1	2	3
1	(France) (Czech Republic)	Amélie Mauresmo; Barbora Strýcová	6; 3	6; 4
2	(France) (Czech Republic)	Fabrice Santoro; Jiří Novák	1; 6	6; 4	2; 6
3	(France) (Czech Republic)	Fabrice Santoro / Amélie Mauresmo; Barbora Strýcová / Jiří Novák	6; 3	6; 4

=== France vs. Russia ===
France
2
Burswood Entertainment Complex, Perth
3 January 2004 – 10 January 2004
Hard (indoors)

Russia
1

			1	2	3
1	(France) (Russia)	Amélie Mauresmo; Anastasia Myskina	6; 2	7; 6
2	(France) (Russia)	Fabrice Santoro; Marat Safin	3; 6	3; 6
3	(France) (Russia)	Fabrice Santoro / Amélie Mauresmo; Anastasia Myskina / Marat Safin	6; 3	6; 4

=== Russia vs. Czech Republic ===
Russia
2
Burswood Entertainment Complex, Perth
3 January 2004 – 10 January 2004
Hard (indoors)

Czech Republic
1

			1	2	3
1	(Russia) (Czech Republic)	Anastasia Myskina; Barbora Strýcová	6; 3	7; 6
2	(Russia) (Czech Republic)	Marat Safin; Jiří Novák	6; 7	7; 6	6; 3
3	(Russia) (Czech Republic)	Anastasia Myskina / Marat Safin; Barbora Strýcová / Jiří Novák	6; 3	6; 7	6; 7

=== United States vs. Czech Republic ===
United States
3
Burswood Entertainment Complex, Perth
3 January 2004 – 10 January 2004
Hard (indoors)

Czech Republic
0

			1	2	3
1	(United States) (Czech Republic)	Lindsay Davenport; Barbora Strýcová	6; 4	6; 3
2	(United States) (Czech Republic)	James Blake; Jiří Novák	4; 6	6; 1	7; 5
3	(United States) (Czech Republic)	Lindsay Davenport / James Blake; Barbora Strýcová / Jiří Novák	6; 3	6; 2

=== United States vs. France ===
United States
3
Burswood Entertainment Complex, Perth
3 January 2004 – 10 January 2004
Hard (indoors)

France
0

			1	2	3
1	(United States) (France)	Lindsay Davenport; Amélie Mauresmo	6; 4	6; 4
2	(United States) (France)	James Blake; Fabrice Santoro	6; 3	6; 4
3	(United States) (France)	Lindsay Davenport / James Blake; Amélie Mauresmo / Fabrice Santoro	7; 5	6; 1

=== United States vs. Russia ===
United States
3
Burswood Entertainment Complex, Perth
3 January 2004 – 10 January 2004
Hard (indoors)

Russia
0

			1	2	3
1	(United States) (Russia)	Lindsay Davenport; Anastasia Myskina	6; 4	6; 4
2	(United States) (Russia)	James Blake; Marat Safin	6; 7	7; 6	6; 4
3	(United States) (Russia)	Lindsay Davenport / James Blake; Anastasia Myskina / Marat Safin	7; 5	6; 4

== Group B ==
=== Teams and standings ===
- Australia^{1} – Alicia Molik and Lleyton Hewitt (Round robin win–loss: 2–1; match win–loss: 7–2; final position: 1)
- Belgium – Kim Clijsters and Xavier Malisse (Round robin win–loss: 1–1; match win–loss: 3–3; final position: 4)
- Canada^{2} – Maureen Drake and Frank Dancevic (Round robin win–loss: 0–2; match win–loss: 1–5; final position: Not ranked)
- Hungary – Petra Mandula and Attila Sávolt (Round robin win–loss: 1–2; match win–loss: 6–6; final position: 3)
- Slovakia – Daniela Hantuchová and Karol Kučera (Round robin win–loss: 2–1; match win–loss: 4–5; final position: 2)

^{1}Due to an injury to Alicia Molik, Australia was unable to compete in the final. Slovakia competed in the final in their place.
^{2}Canada lost in qualifying to Hungary, but then took the place of Belgium in the Hungary-Belgium tie.

=== Australia vs. Belgium ===
Australia
3
Burswood Entertainment Complex, Perth
3 January 2004 – 10 January 2004
Hard (indoors)

Belgium
0

			1	2	3
1	(Australia) (Belgium)	Alicia Molik; Kim Clijsters	3; 6	7; 6	2; 3	retired
2	(Australia) (Belgium)	Lleyton Hewitt; Xavier Malisse	3; 6	6; 1	6; 2
3	(Australia) (Belgium)	Alicia Molik / Lleyton Hewitt; Kim Clijsters / Xavier Malisse				w/o

=== Australia vs. Hungary ===
Australia
3
Burswood Entertainment Complex, Perth
3 January 2004 – 10 January 2004
Hard (indoors)

Hungary
0

			1	2	3
1	(Australia) (Hungary)	Alicia Molik; Petra Mandula	4; 6	7; 6	6; 2
2	(Australia) (Hungary)	Lleyton Hewitt; Attila Sávolt	6; 2	6; 2
3	(Australia) (Hungary)	Alicia Molik / Lleyton Hewitt; Petra Mandula / Attila Sávolt	7; 6	6; 1

=== Belgium vs. Slovakia ===
Belgium
3
Burswood Entertainment Complex, Perth
3 January 2004 – 10 January 2004
Hard (indoors)

Slovakia
0

			1	2	3
1	(Belgium) (Slovakia)	Kim Clijsters; Daniela Hantuchová	6; 1	6; 2
2	(Belgium) (Slovakia)	Xavier Malisse; Karol Kučera	6; 2	1; 6	6; 1
3	(Belgium) (Slovakia)	Kim Clijsters / Xavier Malisse; Daniela Hantuchová / Karol Kučera	6; 2	6; 4

=== Hungary vs. Canada ===
Hungary
3
Burswood Entertainment Complex, Perth
3 January 2004 – 10 January 2004
Hard (indoors)

Canada
0

			1	2	3
1	(Hungary) (Canada)	Petra Mandula; Maureen Drake	6; 7	6; 4	6; 3
2	(Hungary) (Canada)	Attila Sávolt; Frank Dancevic	4; 6	7; 5	7; 6
3	(Hungary) (Canada)	Petra Mandula / Attila Sávolt; Maureen Drake / Frank Dancevic				w/o

=== Slovakia vs. Australia ===
Slovakia
2
Burswood Entertainment Complex, Perth
3 January 2004 – 10 January 2004
Hard (indoors)

Australia
1

			1	2	3
1	(Slovakia) (Australia)	Daniela Hantuchová; Alicia Molik	3; 6	0; 3		retired
2	(Slovakia) (Australia)	Karol Kučera; Lleyton Hewitt	2; 6	7; 6	3; 6
3	(Slovakia) (Australia)	Daniela Hantuchová / Karol Kučera; Alicia Molik / Lleyton Hewitt				w/o

=== Slovakia vs. Hungary ===
Slovakia
2
Burswood Entertainment Complex, Perth
3 January 2004 – 10 January 2004
Hard (indoors)

Hungary
1

			1	2	3
1	(Slovakia) (Hungary)	Daniela Hantuchová; Petra Mandula	0; 6	7; 6	5; 7
2	(Slovakia) (Hungary)	Karol Kučera; Attila Sávolt	6; 3	7; 5
3	(Slovakia) (Hungary)	Daniela Hantuchová / Karol Kučera; Petra Mandula / Attila Sávolt	6; 3	6; 1

== Final ==
=== United States vs. Slovakia ===
United States
2
Burswood Entertainment Complex, Perth
3 January 2004 – 10 January 2004
Hard (indoors)

Slovakia
1

			1	2	3
1	(United States) (Slovakia)	Lindsay Davenport; Daniela Hantuchová	6; 3	6; 1
2	(United States) (Slovakia)	James Blake; Karol Kučera	6; 4	4; 6	6; 7
3	(United States) (Slovakia)	Lindsay Davenport / James Blake; Daniela Hantuchová / Karol Kučera	6; 2	6; 3

2004 Hopman Cup Champions
(United States)
United States
Third title
