= 1994 Hopman Cup =

- Date: 31 December 1993 – 7 January 1994
- Edition: VI
- Surface: Hard (indoor)
- Location: Perth, Western Australia
- Venue: Burswood Entertainment Complex

Champions
- Czech Republic
← 1993 ·	Hopman Cup	· 1995 →

The 1994 Hopman Cup was the sixth edition of the Hopman Cup that was held at the Burswood Entertainment Complex, in Perth, Western Australia. Jana Novotná and Petr Korda of the Czech Republic defeated Anke Huber and Bernd Karbacher of Germany in the final to win the title.

== Teams ==
=== Seeds ===
1. Czech Republic – Jana Novotná and Petr Korda (champions)
2. United States – Mary Joe Fernandez and Ivan Lendl
3. Spain – Conchita Martínez and Emilio Sánchez
4. France – Nathalie Tauziat and Cédric Pioline
5. Australia – Nicole Provis and Wally Masur
6. Ukraine – Natalia Medvedeva and Andrei Medvedev
7. Switzerland – Manuela Maleeva-Fragniere and Jakob Hlasek
8. South Africa – Amanda Coetzer and Marcos Ondruska

=== Unseeded ===
- Austria - Judith Wiesner and Alex Antonitsch
- Germany - Anke Huber and Bernd Karbacher (finalists)
- Netherlands - Miriam Oremans and Jan Siemerink
- Sweden - Catarina Lindqvist and Mikael Pernfors

== Draw ==
First Round
Netherlands	0
7	Switzerland	3
Sweden	1
5	Australia	2
6	Ukraine	0
Austria	3
8	South Africa	1
Germany	2

Quarterfinals
1	Czech Republic	2
7	Switzerland	1
4	France	0
5	Australia	3
Austria	2
3	Spain	1
Germany	2
2	United States	1

Semifinals
1	Czech Republic	2
5	Australia	1
Austria	0
Germany	3

Finals
1	Czech Republic	2
Germany	1

== Results ==
=== First Round ===
==== Switzerland vs. Netherlands ====
Switzerland
3
(Australia) Burswood Entertainment Complex, Perth, Western Australia
1994
Indoor Hard

Netherlands
0

			1	2	3
1	(Switzerland) (Netherlands)	Manuela Maleeva-Fragniere; Miriam Oremans	3; 6	6; 3	6; 1
2	(Switzerland) (Netherlands)	Jakob Hlasek; Jan Siemerink	4; 6	6; 4	7; 5
3	(Switzerland) (Netherlands)	Manuela Maleeva-Fragniere / Jakob Hlasek; Miriam Oremans / Jan Siemerink	8; 6

==== Australia vs. Sweden ====
Australia
2
(Australia) Burswood Entertainment Complex, Perth, Western Australia
1994
Indoor Hard

Sweden
1

			1	2	3
1	(Australia) (Sweden)	Nicole Provis; Catarina Lindqvist	7; 6	6; 1
2	(Australia) (Sweden)	Wally Masur; Mikael Pernfors	4; 6	4; 6
3	(Australia) (Sweden)	Nicole Provis / Wally Masur; Catarina Lindqvist / Stefan Edberg	6; 3	7; 5

==== Austria vs. Ukraine ====
Austria
3
(Australia) Burswood Entertainment Complex, Perth, Western Australia
1994
Indoor Hard

Ukraine
0

			1	2	3
1	(Austria) (Ukraine)	Judith Wiesner; Natalia Medvedeva	7; 6	6; 3
2	(Austria) (Ukraine)	Alex Antonitsch; Andrei Medvedev	4; 6	6; 2	6; 1
3	(Austria) (Ukraine)	Judith Wiesner / Alex Antonitsch; Natalia Medvedeva / Andrei Medvedev				w/o

==== Germany vs. South Africa ====
Germany
2
(Australia) Burswood Entertainment Complex, Perth, Western Australia
1994
Indoor Hard

South Africa
1

			1	2	3
1	(Germany) (South Africa)	Anke Huber; Amanda Coetzer	7; 6	3; 6	6; 1
2	(Germany) (South Africa)	Bernd Karbacher; Marcos Ondruska	6; 4	6; 4
3	(Germany) (South Africa)	Anke Huber / Bernd Karbacher; Amanda Coetzer / Marcos Ondruska	7; 8

=== Quarterfinals ===
==== Czech Republic vs. Switzerland ====
Czech Republic
2
(Australia) Burswood Entertainment Complex, Perth, Western Australia
1994
Indoor Hard

Switzerland
1

			1	2	3
1	(Czech Republic) (Switzerland)	Jana Novotná; Manuela Maleeva-Fragniere	4; 6	5; 7
2	(Czech Republic) (Switzerland)	Petr Korda; Jakob Hlasek	6; 0	6; 2
3	(Czech Republic) (Switzerland)	Jana Novotná / Petr Korda; Manuela Maleeva-Fragniere / Jakob Hlasek	6; 4	6; 4

==== Australia vs. France ====
Australia
3
(Australia) Burswood Entertainment Complex, Perth, Western Australia
1994
Indoor Hard

France
0

			1	2	3
1	(Australia) (France)	Nicole Provis; Nathalie Tauziat	2; 6	7; 6	6; 2
2	(Australia) (France)	Wally Masur; Cédric Pioline	7; 5	6; 4
3	(Australia) (France)	Nicole Provis / Wally Masur; Nathalie Tauziat / Cédric Pioline	8; 4

==== Austria vs. Spain ====
Austria
2
(Australia) Burswood Entertainment Complex, Perth, Western Australia
1994
Indoor Hard

Spain
1

			1	2	3
1	(Austria) (Spain)	Judith Wiesner; Conchita Martínez	6; 2	6; 4
2	(Austria) (Spain)	Alex Antonitsch; Emilio Sánchez	3; 6	6; 4	6; 3
3	(Austria) (Spain)	Judith Wiesner / Alex Antonitsch; Conchita Martínez / Emilio Sánchez	1; 8

==== Germany vs. United States ====
Germany
2
(Australia) Burswood Entertainment Complex, Perth, Western Australia
1994
Indoor Hard

United States
1

			1	2	3
1	(Germany) (United States)	Anke Huber; Mary Joe Fernandez	6; 2	7; 6
2	(Germany) (United States)	Bernd Karbacher; Ivan Lendl	6; 3	6; 1
3	(Germany) (United States)	Anke Huber / Bernd Karbacher; Mary Joe Fernandez / Ivan Lendl	5; 8

=== Semifinals ===
==== Czech Republic vs. Australia ====
Czech Republic
2
(Australia) Burswood Entertainment Complex, Perth, Western Australia
1994
Indoor Hard

Australia
1

			1	2	3
1	(Czech Republic) (Australia)	Jana Novotná; Nicole Provis	6; 2	6; 2
2	(Czech Republic) (Australia)	Petr Korda; Wally Masur	4; 6	6; 1	6; 4
3	(Czech Republic) (Australia)	Jana Novotná / Petr Korda; Nicole Provis / Wally Masur	5; 8

==== Germany vs. Austria ====
Germany
3
(Australia) Burswood Entertainment Complex, Perth, Western Australia
1994
Indoor Hard

Austria
0

			1	2	3
1	(Germany) (Austria)	Anke Huber; Judith Wiesner	6; 2	1; 6	6; 2
2	(Germany) (Austria)	Bernd Karbacher; Alex Antonitsch	7; 6	6; 2
3	(Germany) (Austria)	Anke Huber / Bernd Karbacher; Judith Wiesner / Alex Antonitsch	8; 4

=== Final ===
Czech Republic
2
Burswood Entertainment Complex, Perth, Western Australia
1994
Indoor Hard

Germany
1

			1	2	3
1	(Czech Republic) (Germany)	Jana Novotná; Anke Huber	1; 6	6; 4	6; 3
2	(Czech Republic) (Germany)	Petr Korda; Bernd Karbacher	6; 3	6; 3
3	(Czech Republic) (Germany)	Jana Novotná / Petr Korda; Anke Huber / Bernd Karbacher	3; 8

1994 Hopman Cup Champions
(Czech Republic)
Czech Republic
First title
