= 2018 Hopman Cup =

- Date: 30 December 2017 – 6 January 2018
- Edition: XXX (30th)
- Surface: Hard (indoor)
- Location: Perth, Western Australia
- Venue: Perth Arena

Champions
- Switzerland
← 2017 ·	Hopman Cup	· 2019 →

The Hopman Cup XXX (also known as the 2018 Mastercard Hopman Cup for sponsorship reasons) was the 30th edition of the Hopman Cup tournament between nations in men's and women's tennis. It took place at the Perth Arena in Perth, Western Australia.

France were the defending champions; however they did not return to defend their title. This marked the first edition without France competing since 2010.

Switzerland defeated Germany in the final to win its third title.

== Entrants ==
=== Seeds ===
The draw took place on 5 October 2017 and it placed the 8 teams into two groups, according to the following ranking-based seedings:

Seed	Team	Female player	WTA^{1}	Male player	ATP^{1}	Total	Elimination
1	Germany	Angelique Kerber	12	Alexander Zverev	3	15	Runners-up
2	United States	CoCo Vandeweghe	10	Jack Sock	8	18	Round robin
3	Belgium	Elise Mertens	38	David Goffin	7	49	Round robin
4	Russia	Anastasia Pavlyuchenkova	21	Karen Khachanov	42	63	Round robin
5	Japan	Naomi Osaka	62	Yūichi Sugita	40	102	Round robin
6	Canada	Eugenie Bouchard	79	Vasek Pospisil	84	163	Round robin
7	Switzerland	Belinda Bencic	196	Roger Federer	2	198	Champions
8	Australia	Daria Gavrilova	22	Thanasi Kokkinakis	212	234	Round robin
^{1} – ATP and WTA rankings as of 2 October 2017 (latest before draw date)

=== Replacement players ===
Pre-tournament replacement
Team	Replacement	Original player	Reason
Russia	Anastasia Pavlyuchenkova	Svetlana Kuznetsova	Left wrist injury
In-tournament partial replacement
Japan	(Australia) Maddison Inglis	Naomi Osaka	Illness
United States	(Australia) Pat Cash	Jack Sock	Hip injury
Canada	(Australia) Maddison Inglis	Eugenie Bouchard	Gluteus maximus injury

== Group stage ==
=== Group A ===
All times are local (UTC+8).

==== Standings ====
		Germany	Belgium	Canada	Australia	RR W–L	Matches W–L	Sets W–L	Games W–L	Standings
1	Germany		2–1	3–0	2–1	3–0	7–2	13–4	89–66	1
3	Belgium	1–2		3–0	3–0	2–1	7–2	14–6	97–68	2
6	Canada	0–3	0–3		1–2	0–3	1–8	3–16	56–97	4
8	Australia	1–2	0–3	2–1		1–2	3–6	8–12	80–91	3

==== Australia vs. Canada ====
Australia
2
Perth Arena, Perth
31 December 2017, 10:00
Hard (i)

Canada
1

			1	2	3
1	(Australia) (Canada)	Daria Gavrilova; Eugenie Bouchard	6; 1	6; 4
2	(Australia) (Canada)	Thanasi Kokkinakis; Vasek Pospisil	6; 4	3; 6	6; 3
3	(Australia) (Canada)	Daria Gavrilova / Thanasi Kokkinakis; Eugenie Bouchard / Vasek Pospisil	3^{1} 4^{5}	3^{4} 4^{5}

==== Belgium vs. Germany ====
Belgium
1
Perth Arena, Perth
1 January 2018, 17:30
Hard (i)

Germany
2

			1	2	3
1	(Belgium) (Germany)	Elise Mertens; Angelique Kerber	6^{6} 7^{8}	6^{1} 7^{7}
2	(Belgium) (Germany)	David Goffin; Alexander Zverev	6; 3	6; 3
3	(Belgium) (Germany)	Elise Mertens / David Goffin; Angelique Kerber / Alexander Zverev	2; 4	3^{2} 4^{5}

==== Canada vs. Germany ====
Canada
0
Perth Arena, Perth
3 January 2018, 10:00
Hard (i)

Germany
3

			1	2	3
1	(Canada) (Germany)	Eugenie Bouchard; Angelique Kerber	1; 6	3; 6
2	(Canada) (Germany)	Vasek Pospisil; Alexander Zverev	4; 6	2; 6
3	(Canada) (Germany)	Eugenie Bouchard / Vasek Pospisil; Angelique Kerber / Alexander Zverev	3^{2} 4^{5}	3^{2} 4^{5}

==== Australia vs. Belgium ====
Australia
0
Perth Arena, Perth
3 January 2018, 17:30
Hard (i)

Belgium
3

			1	2	3
1	(Australia) (Belgium)	Daria Gavrilova; Elise Mertens	6; 2	4; 6	2; 6
2	(Australia) (Belgium)	Thanasi Kokkinakis; David Goffin	4; 6	2; 6
3	(Australia) (Belgium)	Daria Gavrilova / Thanasi Kokkinakis; Elise Mertens / David Goffin	3^{3} 4^{5}	4; 2	1; 4

==== Belgium vs. Canada ====
Belgium
3
Perth Arena, Perth
5 January 2018, 10:00
Hard (i)

Canada
0

			1	2	3
1	(Belgium) (Canada)	Elise Mertens; Eugenie Bouchard	6; 4	6; 4
2	(Belgium) (Canada)	David Goffin; Vasek Pospisil	6; 2	6; 4
3	(Belgium) (Canada)	Elise Mertens / David Goffin; Maddison Inglis / Vasek Pospisil	4^{5} 3^{3}	3^{2} 4^{5}	3^{4} 4^{5}

Notes. Due to Eugenie Bouchard's withdrawal from the mixed doubles rubber, the scores are counted as 4–0, 4–0 win for Belgium.

==== Australia vs. Germany ====
Australia
1
Perth Arena, Perth
5 January 2018, 17:30
Hard (i)

Germany
2

			1	2	3
1	(Australia) (Germany)	Daria Gavrilova; Angelique Kerber	1; 6	2; 6
2	(Australia) (Germany)	Thanasi Kokkinakis; Alexander Zverev	5; 7	7^{7} 6^{4}	6; 4
3	(Australia) (Germany)	Daria Gavrilova / Thanasi Kokkinakis; Angelique Kerber / Alexander Zverev	4; 1	1; 4	3^{3} 4^{5}

=== Group B ===
All times are local (UTC+8).

==== Standings ====
		United States	Russia	Japan	Switzerland	RR W–L	Matches W–L	Sets W–L	Games W–L	Standings
2	United States		2–1	2–1	0–3	2–1	4–5	9–11	85–69	2
4	Russia	1–2		2–1	0–3	1–2	3–6	10–13	93–94	3
5	Japan	1–2	1–2		0–3	0–3	2–7	5–15	59–98	4
7	Switzerland	3–0	3–0	3–0		3–0	9–0	18–3	109–76	1

==== Russia vs. United States ====
Russia
1
Perth Arena, Perth
30 December 2017, 10:00
Hard (i)

United States
2

			1	2	3
1	(Russia) (United States)	Anastasia Pavlyuchenkova; CoCo Vandeweghe	3; 6	3; 6
2	(Russia) (United States)	Karen Khachanov; Jack Sock	4; 6	6; 1	3; 6
3	(Russia) (United States)	Anastasia Pavlyuchenkova / Karen Khachanov; CoCo Vandeweghe / Jack Sock	3^{3} 4^{5}	4; 1	4; 2

==== Japan vs. Switzerland ====
Japan
0
Perth Arena, Perth
30 December 2017, 17:30
Hard (i)

Switzerland
3

			1	2	3
1	(Japan) (Switzerland)	Naomi Osaka; Belinda Bencic	5; 7	3; 6
2	(Japan) (Switzerland)	Yūichi Sugita; Roger Federer	4; 6	3; 6
3	(Japan) (Switzerland)	Naomi Osaka / Yūichi Sugita; Belinda Bencic / Roger Federer	4; 2	1; 4	3^{1} 4^{5}

==== Japan vs. United States ====
Japan
2
Perth Arena, Perth
2 January 2018, 10:00
Hard (i)

United States
1

			1	2	3
1	(Japan) (United States)	Maddison Inglis; CoCo Vandeweghe	5; 7	2; 6
2	(Japan) (United States)	Yūichi Sugita; Jack Sock	7^{7} 6^{1}	1; 1		retired
3	(Japan) (United States)	Maddison Inglis / Yūichi Sugita; CoCo Vandeweghe / Pat Cash	0; 4	4^{5} 3^{2}	4; 0

Notes. Maddison Inglis of Australia played instead of Naomi Osaka for the first match. Scores counted as 6–0, 6–0 win for Vandeweghe and 4–0, 4–0 win for the American mixed pair due to Naomi Osaka's withdrawal due to illness. Due to Jack Sock's retirement in the men's singles rubber, the second set is counted as 6–1 win for Sugita. Sock was replaced by Australian Pat Cash for the doubles match.

==== Russia vs. Switzerland ====
Russia
0
Perth Arena, Perth
2 January 2018, 17:30
Hard (i)

Switzerland
3

			1	2	3
1	(Russia) (Switzerland)	Karen Khachanov; Roger Federer	3; 6	6^{8} 7^{10}
2	(Russia) (Switzerland)	Anastasia Pavlyuchenkova; Belinda Bencic	1; 6	6; 3	3; 6
3	(Russia) (Switzerland)	Anastasia Pavlyuchenkova / Karen Khachanov; Belinda Bencic / Roger Federer	3^{1} 4^{5}	4^{5} 3^{3}	1; 4

==== Japan vs. Russia ====
Japan
1
Perth Arena, Perth
4 January 2018, 10:00
Hard (i)

Russia
2

			1	2	3
1	(Japan) (Russia)	Naomi Osaka; Anastasia Pavlyuchenkova	6; 4	3; 6	7^{7} 6^{5}
2	(Japan) (Russia)	Yūichi Sugita; Karen Khachanov	4; 6	2; 6
3	(Japan) (Russia)	Naomi Osaka / Yūichi Sugita; Anastasia Pavlyuchenkova / Karen Khachanov	1; 4	0; 4

==== Switzerland vs. United States ====
Switzerland
3
Perth Arena, Perth
4 January 2018, 17:30
Hard (i)

United States
0

			1	2	3
1	(Switzerland) (United States)	Roger Federer; Jack Sock	7^{7} 6^{5}	7; 5
2	(Switzerland) (United States)	Belinda Bencic; CoCo Vandeweghe	7^{8} 6^{6}	6; 4
3	(Switzerland) (United States)	Belinda Bencic / Roger Federer; CoCo Vandeweghe / Jack Sock	4^{5} 3^{3}	4; 2

== Final ==
=== Germany vs. Switzerland ===
Germany
1
Perth Arena, Perth
6 January 2018,16:00
Hard (i)

Switzerland
2

			1	2	3
1	(Germany) (Switzerland)	Alexander Zverev; Roger Federer	7^{7} 6^{4}	0; 6	2; 6
2	(Germany) (Switzerland)	Angelique Kerber; Belinda Bencic	6; 4	6; 1
3	(Germany) (Switzerland)	Angelique Kerber / Alexander Zverev; Belinda Bencic / Roger Federer	3^{3} 4^{5}	2; 4

2018 Hopman Cup Champions
(Switzerland)
Switzerland
Third title
