= 1998 Hopman Cup =

- Date: 4 January – 10 January 1998
- Edition: X
- Surface: Hard (indoor)
- Location: Perth, Western Australia
- Venue: Burswood Entertainment Complex

Champions
- Slovakia
- Hopman Cup

The Hopman Cup X (also known as the Hyundai Hopman Cup for sponsorship reasons) was the tenth edition of the Hopman Cup tournament between nations in men's and women's tennis. The tournament commenced on 4 January 1998 at the Burswood Entertainment Complex in Burswood, Western Australia.

== Entrants ==
=== Group stage teams ===
Seed	Team	Female player	Male player
1	Slovakia	Karina Habšudová	Karol Kučera
2	Australia	Annabel Ellwood	Patrick Rafter
3	Sweden	Åsa Carlsson	Thomas Enqvist
4	South Africa	Amanda Coetzer	Wayne Ferreira
5	France	Mary Pierce	Cédric Pioline
6	United States	Chanda Rubin	Jonathan Stark
7	Germany	Anke Huber	Tommy Haas
8	Spain	Arantxa Sánchez Vicario	Carlos Moyá

=== Play-off teams ===
Seed	Team	Female player	Male player
1	Romania	Irina Spîrlea	Dinu Pescariu
2	Slovakia	Karina Habšudová	Karol Kučera

== Play-off round ==
Slovakia
2
Burswood Entertainment Complex, Burswood, Australia
1998
Hard (indoors)

Romania
1

			1	2	3
1	(Slovakia) (Romania)	Karina Habšudová; Irina Spîrlea	3; 6	6; 4	6; 2
2	(Slovakia) (Romania)	Karol Kučera; Dinu Pescariu	6; 1	6; 2
3	(Slovakia) (Romania)	Karina Habšudová / Karol Kučera; Irina Spîrlea / Dinu Pescariu	4; 6	6; 4	6; 8

== Group stage ==
=== Group A ===
==== Standings ====
Pos.	Country	W	L	Matches	Sets
1	Slovakia	2	1	6–3	13–6
2	Australia	2	1	6–3	12–9
3	Spain	2	1	5–4	11–8
4	Sweden	0	3	1–8	3–16

==== Australia vs. Sweden ====
Australia
3
Burswood Entertainment Complex, Burswood, Australia
1998
Hard (indoors)

Sweden
0

			1	2	3
1	(Australia) (Sweden)	Annabel Ellwood; Åsa Carlsson	6; 4	6; 4
2	(Australia) (Sweden)	Patrick Rafter; Thomas Enqvist	6; 3	1; 6	7; 5
3	(Australia) (Sweden)	Annabel Ellwood / Patrick Rafter; Åsa Carlsson / Thomas Enqvist	6; 2	6; 4

==== Spain vs. Slovakia ====
Spain
2
Burswood Entertainment Complex, Burswood, Australia
1998
Hard (indoors)

Slovakia
1

			1	2	3
1	(Spain) (Slovakia)	Arantxa Sánchez Vicario; Karina Habšudová	6; 2	6; 3
2	(Spain) (Slovakia)	Carlos Moyá; Karol Kučera	5; 7	4; 6
3	(Spain) (Slovakia)	Arantxa Sánchez Vicario / Carlos Moyá; Karina Habšudová / Karol Kučera	7^{7} 6^{3}	6; 1

==== Slovakia vs. Sweden ====
Slovakia
3
Burswood Entertainment Complex, Burswood, Australia
1998
Hard (indoors)

Sweden
0

			1	2	3
1	(Slovakia) (Sweden)	Karina Habšudová; Åsa Carlsson	6; 3	6; 3
2	(Slovakia) (Sweden)	Karol Kučera; Thomas Enqvist	6; 4	6; 4
3	(Slovakia) (Sweden)	Karina Habšudová / Karol Kučera; Åsa Carlsson / Thomas Enqvist	7; 5	6; 3

==== Australia vs. Spain ====
Australia
2
Burswood Entertainment Complex, Burswood, Australia
1998
Hard (indoors)

Spain
1

			1	2	3
1	(Australia) (Spain)	Annabel Ellwood; Arantxa Sánchez Vicario	2; 6	4; 6
2	(Australia) (Spain)	Patrick Rafter; Carlos Moyá	7; 5	1; 6	7^{8} 6^{6}
3	(Australia) (Spain)	Annabel Ellwood / Patrick Rafter; Arantxa Sánchez Vicario / Carlos Moyá	7; 5	6; 2

==== Spain vs. Sweden ====
Spain
2
Burswood Entertainment Complex, Burswood, Australia
1998
Hard (indoors)

Sweden
1

			1	2	3
1	(Spain) (Sweden)	Arantxa Sánchez Vicario; Åsa Carlsson	6; 2	6; 2
2	(Spain) (Sweden)	Carlos Moyá; Thomas Enqvist	4; 6	1; 6
3	(Spain) (Sweden)	Arantxa Sánchez Vicario / Carlos Moyá; Åsa Carlsson / Thomas Enqvist	6; 3	6; 4

==== Slovakia vs. Australia ====
Slovakia
2
Burswood Entertainment Complex, Burswood, Australia
1998
Hard (indoors)

Australia
1

			1	2	3
1	(Slovakia) (Australia)	Karina Habšudová; Annabel Ellwood	6; 3	6; 3
2	(Slovakia) (Australia)	Karol Kučera; Patrick Rafter	6^{3} 7^{7}	6; 3	6^{3} 7^{7}
3	(Slovakia) (Australia)	Karina Habšudová / Karol Kučera; Annabel Ellwood / Patrick Rafter	7; 5	6; 2

=== Group B ===
==== Standings ====
Pos.	Country	W	L	Matches	Sets
1	France	3	0	9–0	18–2
2	South Africa	2	1	4–5	8–13
3	United States	1	2	3–6	8–13
4	Germany	0	3	2–7	8–14

==== South Africa vs. United States ====
South Africa
2
Burswood Entertainment Complex, Burswood, Australia
1998
Hard (indoors)

United States
1

			1	2	3
1	(South Africa) (United States)	Amanda Coetzer; Chanda Rubin	4; 6	3; 6
2	(South Africa) (United States)	Wayne Ferreira; Jonathan Stark	3; 6	6; 3	6; 4
3	(South Africa) (United States)	Amanda Coetzer / Wayne Ferreira; Chanda Rubin / Jonathan Stark	6; 2	5; 7	6; 1

==== France vs. Germany ====
France
3
Burswood Entertainment Complex, Burswood, Australia
1998
Hard (indoors)

Germany
0

			1	2	3
1	(France) (Germany)	Mary Pierce; Anke Huber	4; 6	6; 4	6; 3
2	(France) (Germany)	Cédric Pioline; Tommy Haas	6; 4	6; 4
3	(France) (Germany)	Mary Pierce / Cédric Pioline; Anke Huber / Tommy Haas	2; 6	6; 3	7; 3

==== South Africa vs. Germany ====
South Africa
2
Burswood Entertainment Complex, Burswood, Australia
1998
Hard (indoors)

Germany
1

			1	2	3
1	(South Africa) (Germany)	Amanda Coetzer; Anke Huber	3; 6	3; 6
2	(South Africa) (Germany)	Wayne Ferreira; Tommy Haas	6; 4	3; 6	6; 1
3	(South Africa) (Germany)	Amanda Coetzer / Wayne Ferreira; Anke Huber / Tommy Haas	6; 2	6; 2

==== France vs. United States ====
France
3
Burswood Entertainment Complex, Burswood, Australia
1998
Hard (indoors)

United States
0

			1	2	3
1	(France) (United States)	Mary Pierce; Chanda Rubin	6; 0	6; 3
2	(France) (United States)	Cédric Pioline; Jonathan Stark	6; 4	6; 3
3	(France) (United States)	Mary Pierce / Cédric Pioline; Chanda Rubin / Jonathan Stark	6; 4	7^{7} 6^{3}

==== United States vs. Germany ====
United States
2
Burswood Entertainment Complex, Burswood, Australia
1998
Hard (indoors)

Germany
1

			1	2	3
1	(United States) (Germany)	Chanda Rubin; Anke Huber	3; 6	1; 6
2	(United States) (Germany)	Jonathan Stark; Tommy Haas	7^{7} 6^{4}	6^{3} 7^{7}	6; 4
3	(United States) (Germany)	Chanda Rubin / Jonathan Stark; Anke Huber / Tommy Haas	6; 3	6; 4

==== France vs. South Africa ====
France
3
Burswood Entertainment Complex, Burswood, Australia
1998
Hard (indoors)

South Africa
0

			1	2	3
1	(France) (South Africa)	Mary Pierce; Amanda Coetzer	6; 3	6; 3
2	(France) (South Africa)	Cédric Pioline; Wayne Ferreira	7^{8} 6^{6}	6; 3
3	(France) (South Africa)	Mary Pierce / Cédric Pioline; Amanda Coetzer / Wayne Ferreira	6; 4	7^{7} 6^{4}

== Final ==
Slovakia
2
Burswood Entertainment Complex, Burswood, Australia
10 January 1998
Hard (indoors)

France
1

			1	2	3
1	(Slovakia) (France)	Karina Habšudová; Mary Pierce	4; 6	5; 7
2	(Slovakia) (France)	Karol Kučera; Cédric Pioline	7^{9} 6^{7}	6; 4
3	(Slovakia) (France)	Karina Habšudová / Karol Kučera; Mary Pierce / Cédric Pioline	6; 3	6; 4

1998 Hopman Cup Champions
(Slovakia)
Slovakia
First title
