= 1999 Hopman Cup =

Australian tennis tournament

- Date: 2 January – 9 January 1999
- Edition: XI
- Surface: Hard indoor
- Location: Perth, Western Australia
- Venue: Burswood Entertainment Complex

Champions
- Australia
- Hopman Cup

The Hopman Cup XI (also known as the Hyundai Hopman Cup for sponsorship reasons) was an Australian tennis tournament played at the Burswood Entertainment Complex located in Perth. Australia's Jelena Dokić and Mark Philippoussis won, defeating Sweden's Åsa Carlsson and Jonas Björkman in the final.

== Team participation ==
- Australia – Jelena Dokić and Mark Philippoussis
- France – Sandrine Testud and Guillaume Raoux
- Slovakia – Karina Habšudová and Karol Kučera
- South Africa – Amanda Coetzer and Wayne Ferreira
- Spain – Arantxa Sánchez Vicario and Carlos Moyà
- Sweden – Åsa Carlsson and Jonas Björkman
- Switzerland – Martina Hingis and Ivo Heuberger
- United States – Lindsay Davenport and Jan-Michael Gambill
- Zimbabwe^{1} – Cara Black and Wayne Black

^{1}Zimbabwe lost in qualifying to France, but then took the place of Spain in the South Africa-Spain series of matches.

== Play-off ==
=== France vs. Zimbabwe ===
France
2
(Australia) Burswood Entertainment Complex in Perth, Western Australia
2 January 1999 – 9 January 1999

Zimbabwe
1

| | | | 1 | 2 | 3 |
|---|---|---|---|---|---|
| 1 | (France) (Zimbabwe) | Sandrine Testud; Cara Black | 4; 6 | 6; 1 | 6; 2 |
| 2 | (France) (Zimbabwe) | Guillaume Raoux; Wayne Black | 6; 1 | 6; 3 |
| 3 | (France) (Zimbabwe) | Sandrine Testud / Guillaume Raoux; Cara Black / Wayne Black | 6; 7 | 6; 7 |

== Group A ==
=== Teams and standings ===
| Pos. | Country | W | L | Matches | Sets | Notes |
|---|---|---|---|---|---|---|
| 1. | Australia | 2 | 1 | 6-3 | 12-6 | Exempt from the doubles match against Spain |
| 2. | South Africa | 2 | 1 | 6-3 | 12-6 | Played last tie against Zimbabwe, who replaced Spain |
| 3. | France | 2 | 1 | 5-4 | 11-8 | Qualified |
| 4. | Spain | 0 | 2 | 1-5 | 2-11 | Withdrew from the tournament, and Zimbabwe took their place |
| 5. | Zimbabwe | 0 | 1 | 0-3 | 0-6 | Lost in qualifying to France, but replaced Spain against South Africa |

=== Australia vs. France ===
Australia
2
(Australia) Burswood Entertainment Complex in Perth, Western Australia
2 January 1999 – 9 January 1999

France
1

| | | | 1 | 2 | 3 |
|---|---|---|---|---|---|
| 1 | (Australia) (France) | Jelena Dokić; Sandrine Testud | 6; 1 | 6; 3 |
| 2 | (Australia) (France) | Mark Philippoussis; Guillaume Raoux | 6; 1 | 6; 2 |
| 3 | (Australia) (France) | Jelena Dokić / Mark Philippoussis; Sandrine Testud / Guillaume Raoux | 2; 6 | 2; 6 |

=== Australia vs. South Africa ===
Australia
1
(Australia) Burswood Entertainment Complex in Perth, Western Australia
2 January 1999 – 9 January 1999

South Africa
2

| | | | 1 | 2 | 3 |
|---|---|---|---|---|---|
| 1 | (Australia) (South Africa) | Jelena Dokić; Amanda Coetzer | 1; 6 | 0; 6 |
| 2 | (Australia) (South Africa) | Mark Philippoussis; Wayne Ferreira | 2; 6 | 3; 6 |
| 3 | (Australia) (South Africa) | Jelena Dokić / Mark Philippoussis; Amanda Coetzer / Wayne Ferreira | 6; 2 | 6; 3 |

=== Australia vs. Spain ===
Australia
3
(Australia) Burswood Entertainment Complex in Perth, Western Australia
2 January 1999 – 9 January 1999

Spain
0

| | | | 1 | 2 | 3 |
|---|---|---|---|---|---|---|
| 1 | (Australia) (Spain) | Jelena Dokić; Arantxa Sánchez Vicario | 6; 3 | 6; 2 |
| 2 | (Australia) (Spain) | Mark Philippoussis; Carlos Moyà | 6; 4 | 7; 6 |
| 3 | (Australia) (Spain) | Jelena Dokić / Mark Philippoussis; Arantxa Sánchez Vicario / Carlos Moyà | 6; 0 | 6; 0 | | w/o |

=== France vs. South Africa ===
France
2
(Australia) Burswood Entertainment Complex in Perth, Western Australia
2 January 1999 – 9 January 1999

South Africa
1

| | | | 1 | 2 | 3 |
|---|---|---|---|---|---|
| 1 | (France) (South Africa) | Sandrine Testud; Amanda Coetzer | 6; 7 | 1; 6 |
| 2 | (France) (South Africa) | Guillaume Raoux; Wayne Ferreira | 6; 3 | 7; 5 |
| 3 | (France) (South Africa) | Sandrine Testud / Guillaume Raoux; Amanda Coetzer / Wayne Ferreira | 7; 6 | 7; 5 |

=== France vs. Spain ===
France
2
(Australia) Burswood Entertainment Complex in Perth, Western Australia
2 January 1999 – 9 January 1999

Spain
1

| | | | 1 | 2 | 3 |
|---|---|---|---|---|---|
| 1 | (France) (Spain) | Sandrine Testud; Arantxa Sánchez Vicario | 6; 1 | 6; 3 |
| 2 | (France) (Spain) | Guillaume Raoux; Carlos Moyà | 6; 7 | 6; 2 | 3; 6 |
| 3 | (France) (Spain) | Sandrine Testud / Guillaume Raoux; Arantxa Sánchez Vicario / Carlos Moyà | 7; 5 | 7; 5 |

=== South Africa vs. Zimbabwe for Spain ===
Zimbabwe had to replace Spain in this series of matches.

South Africa
3
(Australia) Burswood Entertainment Complex in Perth, Western Australia
2 January 1999 – 9 January 1999

Zimbabwe
0

| | | | 1 | 2 | 3 |
|---|---|---|---|---|---|---|
| 1 | (South Africa) (Zimbabwe) | Amanda Coetzer; Cara Black | 6; 3 | 6; 4 |
| 2 | (South Africa) (Zimbabwe) | Wayne Ferreira; Wayne Black | 7; 5 | 7; 6 |
| 3 | (South Africa) (Zimbabwe) | Amanda Coetzer / Wayne Ferreira; Cara Black / Wayne Black | 6; 0 | 6; 0 | | w/o |

== Group B ==
=== Teams and standings ===
| Pos. | Country | W | L | Matches | Sets | Notes |
|---|---|---|---|---|---|---|
| 1. | Sweden | 3 | 0 | 6-3 | 12-8 | |
| 2. | United States | 1 | 2 | 5-4 | 11-9 | |
| 3. | Switzerland | 1 | 2 | 4-5 | 10-11 | |
| 4. | Slovakia | 1 | 2 | 3-6 | 8-13 | |

=== Sweden vs. Slovakia ===
Sweden
2
(Australia) Burswood Entertainment Complex in Perth, Western Australia
2 January 1999 – 9 January 1999

Slovakia
1

| | | | 1 | 2 | 3 |
|---|---|---|---|---|---|
| 1 | (Sweden) (Slovakia) | Åsa Carlsson; Karina Habšudová | 3; 6 | 3; 6 |
| 2 | (Sweden) (Slovakia) | Jonas Björkman; Karol Kučera | 7; 5 | 6; 1 |
| 3 | (Sweden) (Slovakia) | Åsa Carlsson / Jonas Björkman; Karina Habšudová / Karol Kučera | 6; 3 | 3; 6 | 6; 1 |

=== Slovakia vs. Switzerland ===
Slovakia
2
(Australia) Burswood Entertainment Complex in Perth, Western Australia
2 January 1999 – 9 January 1999

Switzerland
1

| | | | 1 | 2 | 3 |
|---|---|---|---|---|---|
| 1 | (Slovakia) (Switzerland) | Karina Habšudová; Martina Hingis | 0; 6 | 3; 6 |
| 2 | (Slovakia) (Switzerland) | Karol Kučera; Ivo Heuberger | 5; 7 | 6; 4 | 6; 3 |
| 3 | (Slovakia) (Switzerland) | Karina Habšudová / Karol Kučera; Martina Hingis / Ivo Heuberger | 6; 4 | 6; 0 |

=== Slovakia vs. United States ===
Slovakia
0
(Australia) Burswood Entertainment Complex in Perth, Western Australia
2 January 1999 – 9 January 1999

United States
3

| | | | 1 | 2 | 3 |
|---|---|---|---|---|---|
| 1 | (Slovakia) (United States) | Karina Habšudová; Lindsay Davenport | 4; 6 | 2; 6 |
| 2 | (Slovakia) (United States) | Karol Kučera; Jan-Michael Gambill | 7; 5 | 6; 7 | 4; 6 |
| 3 | (Slovakia) (United States) | Karina Habšudová / Karol Kučera; Lindsay Davenport / Jan-Michael Gambill | 5; 7 | 3; 6 |

=== Sweden vs. Switzerland ===
Sweden
2
(Australia) Burswood Entertainment Complex in Perth, Western Australia
2 January 1999 – 9 January 1999

Switzerland
1

| | | | 1 | 2 | 3 |
|---|---|---|---|---|---|
| 1 | (Sweden) (Switzerland) | Åsa Carlsson; Martina Hingis | 2; 6 | 2; 6 |
| 2 | (Sweden) (Switzerland) | Jonas Björkman; Ivo Heuberger | 6; 2 | 6; 0 |
| 3 | (Sweden) (Switzerland) | Åsa Carlsson / Jonas Björkman; Martina Hingis / Ivo Heuberger | 2; 6 | 6; 3 | 6; 4 |

=== Sweden vs. United States ===
Sweden
2
(Australia) Burswood Entertainment Complex in Perth, Western Australia
2 January 1999 – 9 January 1999

United States
1

| | | | 1 | 2 | 3 |
|---|---|---|---|---|---|
| 1 | (Sweden) (United States) | Åsa Carlsson; Lindsay Davenport | 2; 6 | 0; 6 |
| 2 | (Sweden) (United States) | Jonas Björkman; Jan-Michael Gambill | 6; 2 | 6; 4 |
| 3 | (Sweden) (United States) | Åsa Carlsson / Jonas Björkman; Lindsay Davenport / Jan-Michael Gambill | 7; 6 | 6; 4 |

=== Switzerland vs. United States ===
Switzerland
2
(Australia) Burswood Entertainment Complex in Perth, Western Australia
2 January 1999 – 9 January 1999

United States
1

| | | | 1 | 2 | 3 |
|---|---|---|---|---|---|
| 1 | (Switzerland) (United States) | Martina Hingis; Lindsay Davenport | 6; 3 | 5; 7 | 6; 2 |
| 2 | (Switzerland) (United States) | Ivo Heuberger; Jan-Michael Gambill | 4; 6 | 4; 6 |
| 3 | (Switzerland) (United States) | Martina Hingis / Ivo Heuberger; Lindsay Davenport / Jan-Michael Gambill | 6; 3 | 6; 3 |

== Final ==
Australia
2
(Australia) Burswood Entertainment Complex in Perth, Western Australia
2 January 1999 – 9 January 1999

Sweden
1

| | | | 1 | 2 | 3 |
|---|---|---|---|---|---|
| 1 | (Australia) (Sweden) | Jelena Dokić; Åsa Carlsson | 6; 2 | 7^{10} 6^{8} |
| 2 | (Australia) (Sweden) | Mark Philippoussis; Jonas Björkman | 6; 3 | 7^{8} 6^{6} |
| 3 | (Australia) (Sweden) | Jelena Dokić / Mark Philippoussis; Åsa Carlsson / Jonas Björkman | 6; 8 |

1999 Hopman Cup Champions
(Australia)
Australia
First title
