= 2001 Hopman Cup =

- Date: 30 December 2000 – 6 January 2001
- Edition: XIII
- Surface: Hard indoor
- Location: Perth, Western Australia
- Venue: Burswood Entertainment Complex

Champions
- Switzerland
- Hopman Cup

The 2001 Hopman Cup (also known as the Hyundai Hopman Cup for sponsorship reasons) was a tennis championship won by Switzerland's Martina Hingis and Roger Federer. Hingis and Federer defeated Monica Seles and Jan-Michael Gambill of the United States in the final. The tournament was hosted at the Burswood Entertainment Complex in Perth, Western Australia from 30 December 2000 through 7 January 2001.

== Overall standings ==
| Nr | Country | Players | Place | Round Robin W-L | Matches W-L | Sets W-L |
|---|---|---|---|---|---|---|
| 1. | Switzerland | Martina Hingis / Roger Federer | Champions | 3–0 | 8–1 | 17–2 |
| 2. | United States | Monica Seles / Jan-Michael Gambill | Runners-up | 3–0 | 8–1 | 17–7 |
| 3. | South Africa | Amanda Coetzer / Wayne Ferreira | Second place-Group A | 2–1 | 5–4 | 11–10 |
| 4. | Thailand | Tamarine Tanasugarn / Paradorn Srichaphan | Third place-Group A | 1–2 | 4–5 | 7–12 |
| 5. | Russia | Elena Likhovtseva / Marat Safin | Second place-Group B | 1–2 | 4–5 | 11–13 |
| 6. | Slovakia | Karina Habšudová / Dominik Hrbatý | Third place-Group B | 1–2 | 3–6 | 12–15 |
| 7. | Belgium | Kim Clijsters / Olivier Rochus | Fourth place-Group B | 1–2 | 3–6 | 8–18 |
| 8. | Australia | Nicole Pratt / Richard Fromberg | Fourth place-Group A | 0–3 | 1–8 | 4–15 |
| 9. | Japan | Ai Sugiyama / Takao Suzuki | Did not qualify | 0–0 | 0–0 | 0–0 |

== Play-off ==
=== Belgium vs. Japan ===
Belgium
2
(Australia) Burswood Entertainment Complex, Perth, Western Australia

Hard (indoors)

Japan
1

| | | | 1 | 2 | 3 |
|---|---|---|---|---|---|
| 1 | (Belgium) (Japan) | Kim Clijsters; Ai Sugiyama | 7; 6 | 5; 7 | 6; 4 |
| 2 | (Belgium) (Japan) | Olivier Rochus; Takao Suzuki | 3; 6 | 6; 4 | 4; 6 |
| 3 | (Belgium) (Japan) | Kim Clijsters / Olivier Rochus; Ai Sugiyama / Takao Suzuki | 6; 4 | 6; 4 |

== Group A ==
=== Teams and standings ===
| Team | Players | Placing | Round Robins W-L | Matches W-L | Sets W-L |
|---|---|---|---|---|---|
| Switzerland | Martina Hingis / Roger Federer | 1 | 3–0 | 8–1 | 17–2 |
| South Africa | Amanda Coetzer / Wayne Ferreira | 2 | 2–1 | 5–4 | 11–10 |
| Thailand | Tamarine Tanasugarn / Paradorn Srichaphan | 3 | 1–2 | 4–5 | 7–12 |
| Australia | Nicole Pratt / Richard Fromberg | 4 | 0–3 | 1–8 | 4–15 |

=== South Africa vs. Australia ===
South Africa
2
(Australia) Burswood Entertainment Complex, Perth, Western Australia

Hard (indoors)

Australia
1

| | | | 1 | 2 | 3 |
|---|---|---|---|---|---|
| 1 | (South Africa) (Australia) | Amanda Coetzer; Nicole Pratt | 6; 3 | 7; 5 |
| 2 | (South Africa) (Australia) | Wayne Ferreira; Richard Fromberg | 6; 7 | 5; 7 |
| 3 | (South Africa) (Australia) | Amanda Coetzer / Wayne Ferreira; Nicole Pratt / Richard Fromberg | 7; 6 | 2; 6 | 7; 6 |

=== South Africa vs. Thailand ===
South Africa
2
Burswood Entertainment Complex, Perth, Western Australia

Thailand
1

| | | | 1 | 2 | 3 |
|---|---|---|---|---|---|
| 1 | (South Africa) (Thailand) | Amanda Coetzer; Tamarine Tanasugarn | 6; 4 | 6; 4 |
| 2 | (South Africa) (Thailand) | Wayne Ferreira; Paradorn Srichaphan | 3; 6 | 6; 2 | 5; 7 |
| 3 | (South Africa) (Thailand) | Amanda Coetzer / Wayne Ferreira; Tamarine Tanasugarn / Paradorn Srichaphan | 6; 4 | 6; 1 |

=== Switzerland vs. Australia ===
Switzerland
3
Burswood Entertainment Complex, Perth, Western Australia

Australia
0

| | | | 1 | 2 | 3 |
|---|---|---|---|---|---|
| 1 | (Switzerland) (Australia) | Martina Hingis; Nicole Pratt | 6; 1 | 6; 1 |
| 2 | (Switzerland) (Australia) | Roger Federer; Richard Fromberg | 6; 3 | 6; 2 |
| 3 | (Switzerland) (Australia) | Martina Hingis / Roger Federer; Nicole Pratt / Richard Fromberg | 6; 1 | 6; 3 |

=== Switzerland vs. South Africa ===
Switzerland
2
(Australia) Burswood Entertainment Complex, Perth, Western Australia

Hard (indoors)

South Africa
1

| | | | 1 | 2 | 3 |
|---|---|---|---|---|---|
| 1 | (Switzerland) (South Africa) | Martina Hingis; Amanda Coetzer | 6; 1 | 6; 0 |
| 2 | (Switzerland) (South Africa) | Roger Federer; Wayne Ferreira | 3; 6 | 6; 3 | 3; 6 |
| 3 | (Switzerland) (South Africa) | Martina Hingis / Roger Federer; Amanda Coetzer / Wayne Ferreira | 6; 2 | 6; 3 |

=== Switzerland vs. Thailand ===
Switzerland
3
(Australia) Burswood Entertainment Complex, Perth, Western Australia

Hard (indoors)

Thailand
0

| | | | 1 | 2 | 3 |
|---|---|---|---|---|---|
| 1 | (Switzerland) (Thailand) | Martina Hingis; Tamarine Tanasugarn | 6; 1 | 6; 1 |
| 2 | (Switzerland) (Thailand) | Roger Federer; Paradorn Srichaphan | 6; 4 | 6; 2 |
| 3 | (Switzerland) (Thailand) | Martina Hingis / Roger Federer; Tamarine Tanasugarn / Paradorn Srichaphan | 6; 0 | 6; 1 |

=== Thailand vs. Australia ===
Thailand
3
(Australia) Burswood Entertainment Complex

Hard (indoors)

Australia
0

| | | | 1 | 2 | 3 |
|---|---|---|---|---|---|
| 1 | (Thailand) (Australia) | Tamarine Tanasugarn; Nicole Pratt | 6; 3 | 4; 6 | 7; 5 |
| 2 | (Thailand) (Australia) | Paradorn Srichaphan; Richard Fromberg | 7; 6 | 7; 5 |
| 3 | (Thailand) (Australia) | Tamarine Tanasugarn / Paradorn Srichaphan; Nicole Pratt / Richard Fromberg | 8; 7 |

== Group B ==
=== Teams and standings ===
| Team | Players | Placing | Round Robin W-L | Matches W-L | Sets W-L |
|---|---|---|---|---|---|
| United States | Monica Seles / Jan-Michael Gambill | 1 | 3–0 | 8–1 | 17–7 |
| Russia | Elena Likhovtseva / Marat Safin | 2 | 1–2 | 4–5 | 11–13 |
| Slovakia | Karina Habšudová / Dominik Hrbatý | 3 | 1–2 | 3–6 | 12–15 |
| Belgium | Kim Clijsters / Olivier Rochus | 4 | 1–2 | 3–6 | 8–18 |

=== Belgium vs. Russia ===
Belgium
2
(Australia) Burswood Entertainment Complex, Perth, Western Australia

Hard (indoors)

Russia
1

| | | | 1 | 2 | 3 |
|---|---|---|---|---|---|
| 1 | (Belgium) (Russia) | Kim Clijsters; Elena Likhovtseva | 6; 1 | 6; 4 |
| 2 | (Belgium) (Russia) | Olivier Rochus; Marat Safin | 6; 2 | 1; 6 | 6; 3 |
| 3 | (Belgium) (Russia) | Kim Clijsters / Olivier Rochus; Elena Likhovtseva / Marat Safin | 3; 6 | 6; 7 |

=== Russia vs. Slovakia ===
Russia
2
(Australia) Burswood Entertainment Complex, Perth, Western Australia

Hard (indoors)

Slovakia
1

| | | | 1 | 2 | 3 |
|---|---|---|---|---|---|
| 1 | (Russia) (Slovakia) | Elena Likhovtseva; Karina Habšudová | 6; 7 | 6; 3 | 3; 6 |
| 2 | (Russia) (Slovakia) | Marat Safin; Dominik Hrbatý | 6; 3 | 0; 6 | 6; 4 |
| 3 | (Russia) (Slovakia) | Elena Likhovtseva / Marat Safin; Karina Habšudová / Dominik Hrbatý | 6; 2 | 4; 6 | 7; 6 |

=== Slovakia vs. Belgium ===
Slovakia
2
Burswood Entertainment Complex, Perth, Western Australia

Belgium
1

| | | | 1 | 2 | 3 |
|---|---|---|---|---|---|
| 1 | (Slovakia) (Belgium) | Karina Habšudová; Kim Clijsters | 6; 0 | 4; 6 | 1; 6 |
| 2 | (Slovakia) (Belgium) | Dominik Hrbatý; Olivier Rochus | 6; 3 | 6; 0 |
| 3 | (Slovakia) (Belgium) | Karina Habšudová / Dominik Hrbatý; Kim Clijsters / Olivier Rochus | 6; 4 | 3; 6 | 6; 3 |

=== United States vs. Belgium ===
United States
3
(Australia) Burswood Entertainment Complex, Perth, Western Australia

Hard (indoors)

Belgium
0

| | | | 1 | 2 | 3 |
|---|---|---|---|---|---|
| 1 | (United States) (Belgium) | Monica Seles; Kim Clijsters | 7; 6 | 6; 0 |
| 2 | (United States) (Belgium) | Jan-Michael Gambill; Olivier Rochus | 7; 6 | 6; 4 |
| 3 | (United States) (Belgium) | Monica Seles / Jan-Michael Gambill; Kim Clijsters / Olivier Rochus | 4; 6 | 6; 1 | 7; 6 |

=== United States vs. Russia ===
United States
2
(Australia) Burswood Entertainment Complex, Perth, Western Australia

Hard (indoors)

Russia
1

| | | | 1 | 2 | 3 |
|---|---|---|---|---|---|
| 1 | (United States) (Russia) | Monica Seles; Elena Likhovtseva | 6; 3 | 6; 3 |
| 2 | (United States) (Russia) | Jan-Michael Gambill; Marat Safin | 3; 6 | 7; 6 | 3; 6 |
| 3 | (United States) (Russia) | Monica Seles / Jan-Michael Gambill; Elena Likhovtseva / Marat Safin | 4; 6 | 6; 2 | 6; 2 |

=== United States vs. Slovakia ===
United States
3
(Australia) Burswood Entertainment Complex, Perth, Western Australia

Hard (indoors)

Slovakia
0

| | | | 1 | 2 | 3 |
|---|---|---|---|---|---|
| 1 | (United States) (Slovakia) | Monica Seles; Karina Habšudová | 6; 3 | 3; 6 | 6; 1 |
| 2 | (United States) (Slovakia) | Jan-Michael Gambill; Dominik Hrbatý | 6; 3 | 3; 6 | 6; 4 |
| 3 | (United States) (Slovakia) | Monica Seles / Jan-Michael Gambill; Karina Habšudová / Dominik Hrbatý | 4; 6 | 6; 2 | 7; 6 |

== Final ==
Switzerland
2

Hard (indoors)

United States
1

| | | | 1 | 2 | 3 |
|---|---|---|---|---|---|
| 1 | (Switzerland) (United States) | Martina Hingis; Monica Seles | 7; 5 | 6; 4 |
| 2 | (Switzerland) (United States) | Roger Federer; Jan-Michael Gambill | 6; 4 | 6; 3 |
| 3 | (Switzerland) (United States) | Martina Hingis / Roger Federer; Monica Seles / Jan-Michael Gambill | 6; 2 | 4; 6 | 6; 7 |

2001 Hopman Cup Champions
(Switzerland)
Switzerland
Second title
