= 1996 Hopman Cup =

- Date: 31 December 1995 – 6 January 1996
- Edition: VIII
- Surface: Hard (indoor)
- Location: Perth, Western Australia
- Venue: Burswood Entertainment Complex

Champions
- Croatia
← 1995 ·	Hopman Cup	· 1997 →

The 1996 Hopman Cup was the eighth edition of the Hopman Cup that was held at the Burswood Entertainment Complex, in Perth, Western Australia.

== Teams ==
1. Croatia – Iva Majoli and Goran Ivanišević (champions)
2. Netherlands – Brenda Schultz-McCarthy and Richard Krajicek
3. Switzerland – Martina Hingis and Marc Rosset (finalists)
4. South Africa – Amanda Coetzer and Wayne Ferreira

5. United States – Chanda Rubin and Richey Reneberg
6. Australia – Nicole Bradtke and Mark Philippoussis
7. Germany – Anke Huber and Martin Sinner
8. France – Catherine Tanvier and Arnaud Boetsch

== Final ==
Croatia
2
Burswood Entertainment Complex, Perth, Western Australia
1996
Indoor Hard

Switzerland
1

			1	2	3
1	(Croatia) (Switzerland)	Iva Majoli; Martina Hingis	3; 6	0; 6
2	(Croatia) (Switzerland)	Goran Ivanišević; Marc Rosset	7; 6	7; 5
3	(Croatia) (Switzerland)	Goran Ivanišević / Iva Majoli; Marc Rosset / Martina Hingis	3; 6	7; 6	5; 5	retired

1996 Hopman Cup Champions
(Croatia)
Croatia
First title
