= Burswood Dome =

Multipurpose indoor arena in Perth, Western Australia

The Dome at Crown Perth
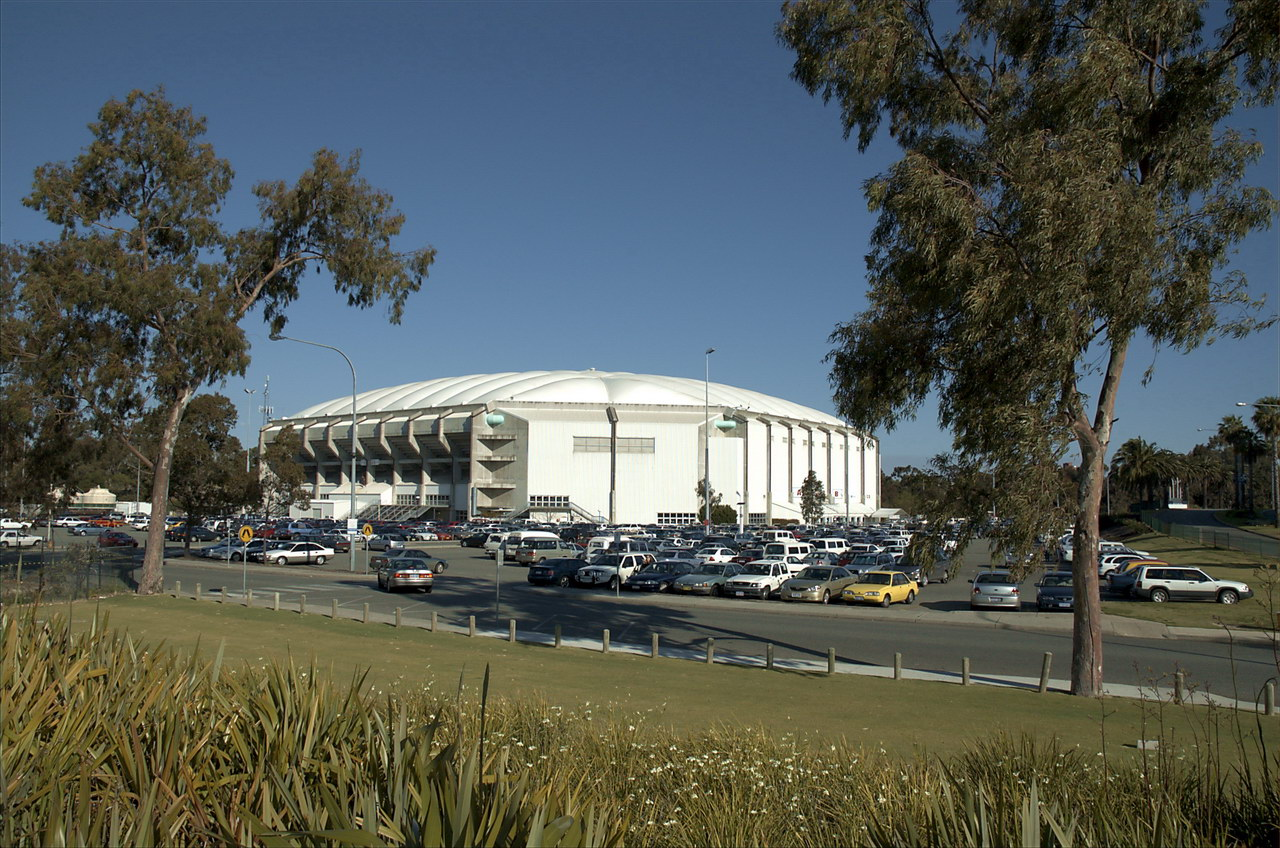
- Former names: Burswood Superdome (1987–1999); Burswood Dome (1999–2012)
- Address: Crown Perth; Great Eastern Highway; Burswood WA 6100; Australia
- Location: Perth, Western Australia
- Owner: Crown Limited Group
- Capacity: 21,754 or 13,600 (seated); 8,500 (basketball); 7,000 (tennis)

Construction
- Opened: 28 August 1987
- Closed: 7 September 2012
- Demolished: 5 July 2013

Tenants
- Hopman Cup (1989–2012); Perth Wildcats (1994; 2004)

The Dome at Crown Perth (originally the Burswood Superdome and formerly the Burswood Dome) was a multi-purpose indoor arena used for sports and entertainment. The dome was 8,800 square metres (95,000 sq ft) in size, with seating for 13,600 people. The whole arena was pressurised so that the fibreglass roof was suspended 35 metres (115 ft) above the ground.

It was a venue for indoor sports, notably the Hopman Cup tennis tournament from 1989 until 2012, which was moved to the Perth Arena for the 2013 and future events, and for music concerts.

== Entertainment ==
Many notable artists performed there, the record attendance being 20,000 for Cliff Richard & The Shadows. Other performers since 1987 have included AC/DC, Kiss, U2, Mick Jagger, Michael Jackson, Gloria Estefan, Mariah Carey, Pink, Lady Gaga, Kylie Minogue, Elton John, Iron Maiden, Britney Spears, Beyoncé, The Black Eyed Peas, Guns N' Roses, Florence and the Machine, George Michael, Christina Aguilera, Delta Goodrem, Gwen Stefani, Justin Bieber, Coldplay, Taylor Swift, Linkin Park, Rihanna, Roger Waters, The Wiggles and Top Gear Live.

== Sports ==
As a sports venue, the Dome was the home of the Hopman Cup and occasionally hosted Perth Wildcats' National Basketball League games. At one time the dome was also considered as a possible home venue for the A-League's Perth Glory while renovations were taking place at their usual home, Perth Oval, though the Glory eventually decided to stay at the Oval rather than play inside the Dome on an artificial surface. The Dome was also the venue used for World Wrestling Entertainment (WWE) shows in Perth while on their Australian tours.

== Closure and demolition ==
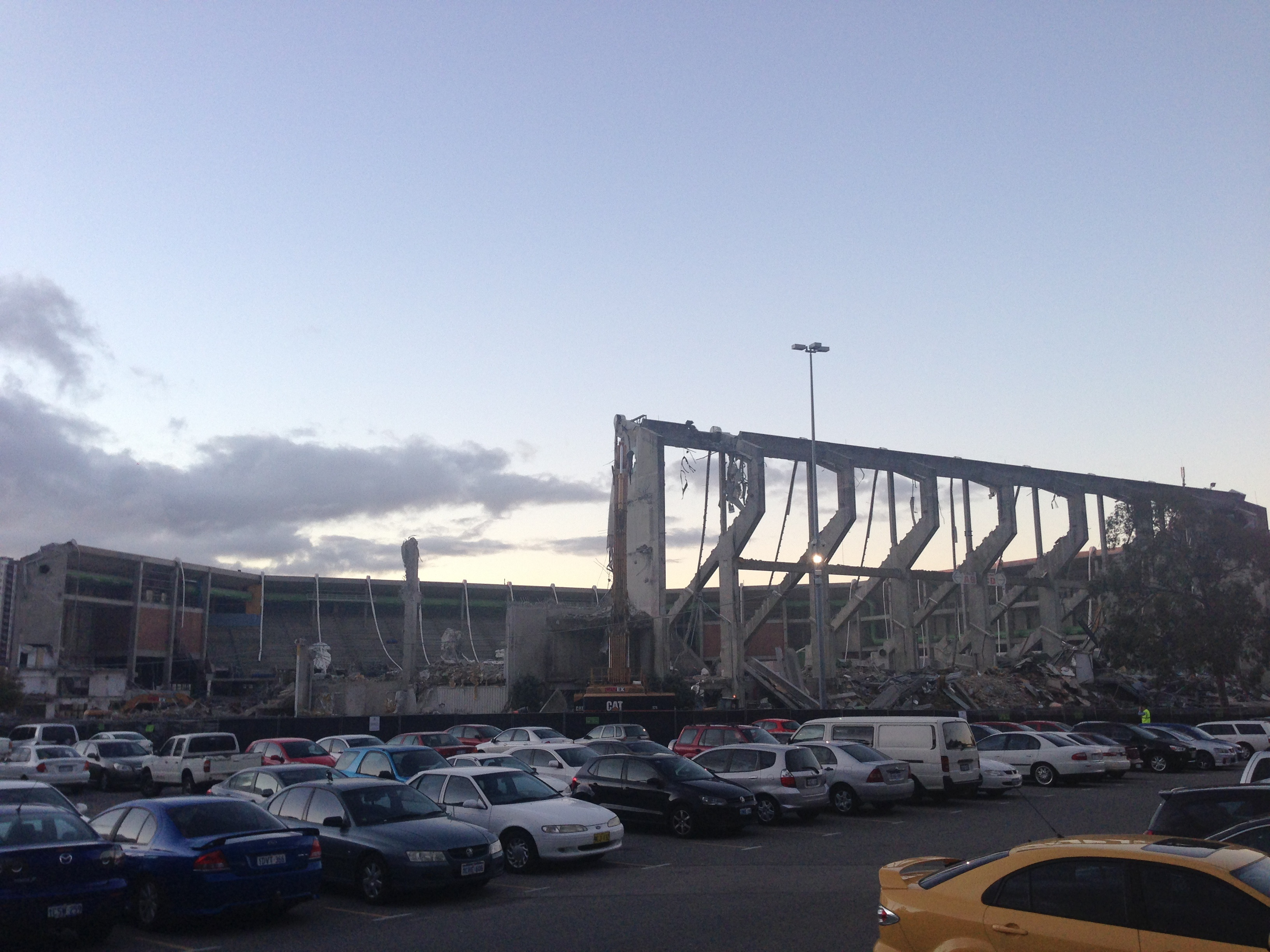
The Dome at Crown being demolished, August 2013

By October 2010, firm plans for Crown's major new hotel development and for a state-controlled Perth Stadium on nearby land ensured that the dome would be removed. Government approval for demolition was granted on 31 May 2012, and demolition works started in July 2013 with the land to be used for 1000 car parking bays. The roof was deflated on 28 June 2013.

== See also ==
- List of indoor arenas in Australia
