= Serbia at the Hopman Cup =

Sporting event delegation

Serbia
- First year: 1989
- Years played: 7
- Hopman Cup titles: 1 (1991)
- Runners-up: 2 (2008, 2013)
- Most total wins: Novak Djokovic (20–8)
- Most singles wins: Novak Djokovic (11–3)
- Most doubles wins: Novak Djokovic (9–5)
- Best doubles team: Novak Djokovic & Ana Ivanovic (6–4)
- Most years played: Novak Djokovic (4)

The Serbia Hopman Cup team has represented Serbia in three Hopman Cup tournaments since the country attained independence. The team reached the final in each appearance: in 2008, where they were defeated by the United States; in 2011, when they withdrew before the final due to an abdominal injury sustained by Ana Ivanovic; and in 2013, when they lost to Spain.

As the legal successor, Serbia inherited all previous results from the former Yugoslavia and Serbia and Montenegro teams. Since June 2006, following the dissolution of Serbia and Montenegro, the team has competed under the name Serbia.

The team first participated in the inaugural Hopman Cup in 1989 under the name Yugoslavia. Yugoslavia competed in three consecutive Hopman Cup tournaments before the country's breakup in the early 1990s, winning the tournament once, in 1991. Competing under the name Serbia and Montenegro, the team participated in the 18th Hopman Cup in 2006.

== Players ==
This is a list of players who represented Serbia and Serbia and Montenegro in the Hopman Cup.

Name	Total W–L	Singles W–L	Doubles W–L	First year played	Tenure
Novak Djokovic	20–8	11–3	9–5	2006	4
Ana Ivanovic	13–7	7–3	6–4	2006	3
Jelena Janković	4–3	1–2	3–1	2008	1

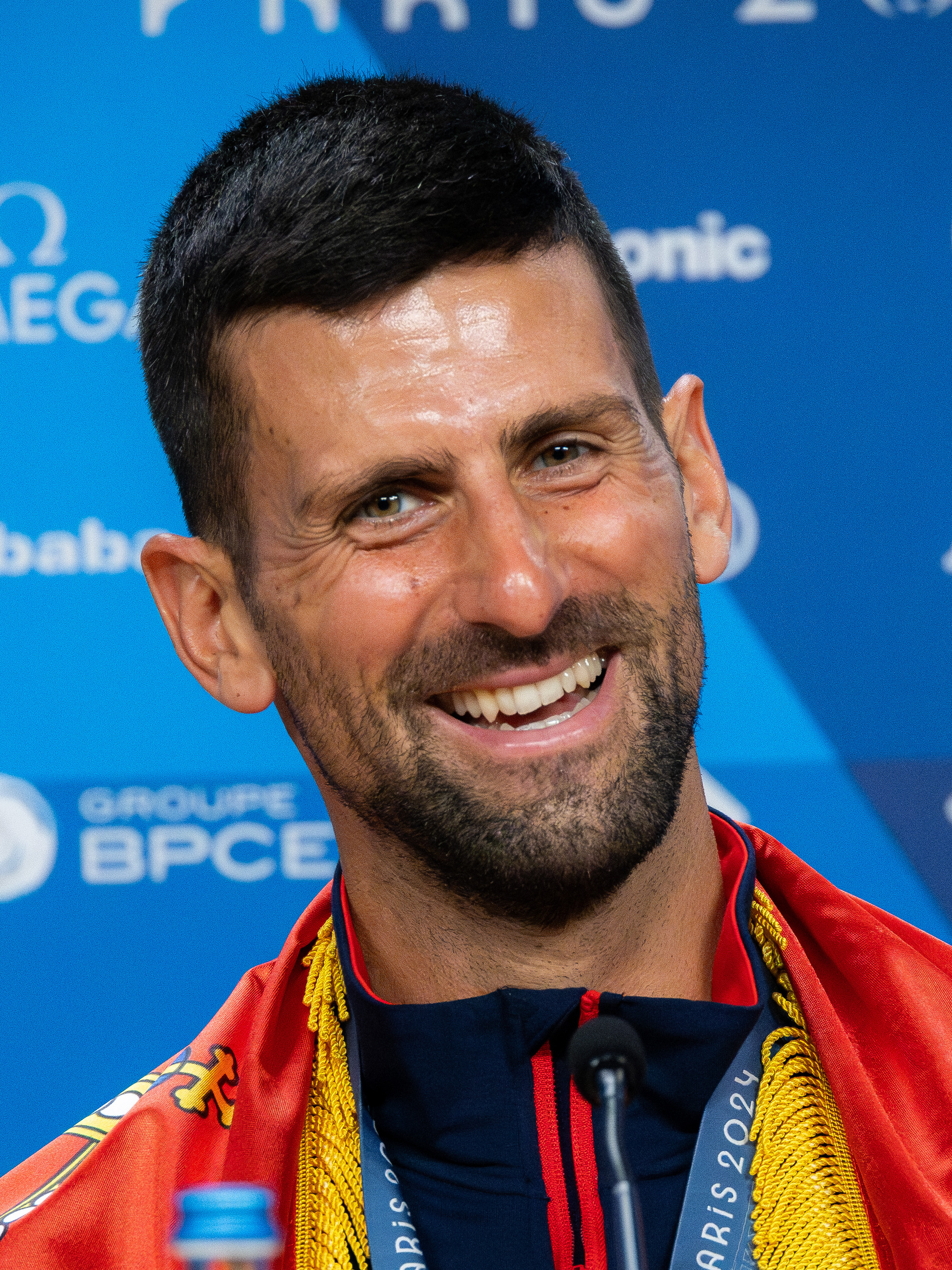
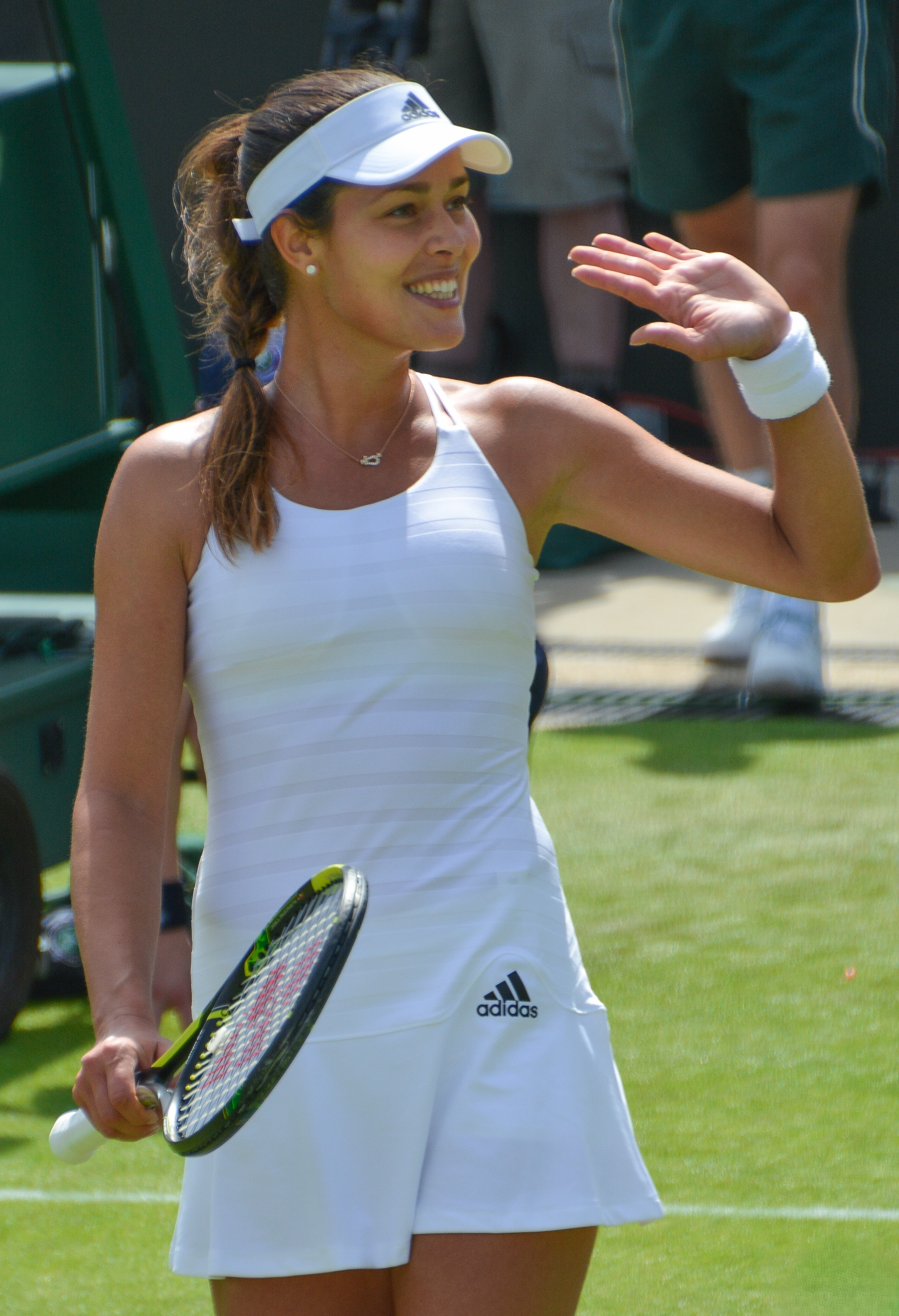
Novak Djokovic, former World No. 1 in ATP rankings, and Ana Ivanovic, former World No. 1 in WTA rankings, have made the most appearances representing Serbia at the Hopman Cup.

This is a list of players who represented Yugoslavia in the Hopman Cup.

Name	Total W–L	Singles W–L	Doubles W–L	First year played	Tenure
Slobodan Živojinović	0–4	0–2	0–2	1989	2
Karmen Škulj	0–2	0–1	0–1	1989	1
Sabrina Goleš	0–2	0–1	0–1	1990	1
Monica Seles	8–0	4–0	4–0	1991	1
Goran Prpić	6–2	2–2	4–0	1991	1

Team rosters by year

- 1989: Karmen Škulj – Slobodan Živojinović
- 1990: Sabrina Goleš – Slobodan Živojinović
- 1991: Monica Seles – Goran Prpić
- 2006: Ana Ivanovic – Novak Djokovic
- 2008: Jelena Janković – Novak Djokovic
- 2011: Ana Ivanovic – Novak Djokovic
- 2013: Ana Ivanovic – Novak Djokovic

== Results ==
Year	Competition	Location	Opponent	Score	Result
1989	First Round	Burswood Dome, Perth	Sweden	0–3	Lost
1990	First Round	Burswood Dome, Perth	Australia	0–3	Lost
1991	First Round	Burswood Dome, Perth	Italy	3–0	Won
1991	Quarterfinals	Burswood Dome, Perth	Soviet Union	2–1	Won
1991	Semifinals	Burswood Dome, Perth	France	2–1	Won
1991	Final	Burswood Dome, Perth	United States	3–0	Champion
2006	Round Robin	Burswood Dome, Perth	United States	1–2	Lost
2006	Round Robin	Burswood Dome, Perth	Sweden	2–1	Won
2006	Round Robin	Burswood Dome, Perth	Russia	2–1	Won
2008	Round Robin	Burswood Dome, Perth	Chinese Taipei	3–0	Won
2008	Round Robin	Burswood Dome, Perth	France	2–1	Won
2008	Round Robin	Burswood Dome, Perth	Argentina	2–1	Won
2008	Final	Burswood Dome, Perth	United States	2–1	Runner-up (Note: Janković was unable to play her singles match against Serena Williams due to injury, giving the USA a one-point lead going into the men's singles and mixed doubles matches.)
2011	Round Robin	Burswood Dome, Perth	Kazakhstan	3–0	Won
2011	Round Robin	Burswood Dome, Perth	Australia	3–0	Won
2011	Round Robin	Burswood Dome, Perth	Belgium	1–2	Lost
2011	Final	Burswood Dome, Perth	United States	N/P	Withdrew (Note: Serbia finished top of their group but due to an abdominal injury sustained by Ivanovic they were unable to compete in the final and were replaced by Belgium instead.)
2013	Round Robin	Perth Arena, Perth	Italy	2–1	Won
2013	Round Robin	Perth Arena, Perth	Australia	2–1	Won
2013	Round Robin	Perth Arena, Perth	Germany	3–0	Won
2013	Final	Perth Arena, Perth	Spain	2–1	Runner-up

== Head to head ==
(by No. of ties)

- vs Australia 3 ties 2–1
- vs United States 3 tie 1–2
- vs France 2 tie 2–0
- vs Italy 2 ties 2–0
- vs Soviet Union/Russia 2 tie 2–0
- vs Sweden 2 ties 1–1
- vs Argentina 1 tie 1–0
- vs Belgium 1 tie 0–1
- vs Chinese Taipei 1 tie 1–0
- vs Germany 1 tie 1–0
- vs Kazakhstan 1 tie 1–0
- vs Spain 1 tie 0–1

== See also ==
- Serbia Davis Cup team
- Serbia Billie Jean King Cup team
