= Switzerland at the Hopman Cup =

Sporting event delegation

Switzerland
- First year: 1991
- Years played: 13
- Hopman Cup titles: 4 (1992, 2001, 2018, 2019)
- Runners-up: 2 (1996, 2023)
- Most total wins: Roger Federer (27–9)
- Most singles wins: Martina Hingis (14–0); Roger Federer (14−4)
- Most doubles wins: Roger Federer (13–5)
- Best doubles team: Belinda Bencic & Roger Federer (9–2)
- Most years played: Roger Federer (5)

Switzerland is a nation that has competed at the Hopman Cup tournament on thirteen occasions, the first being at the third annual staging in 1991. It won the tournament in 1992, 2001, 2018, and 2019, and was also runners-up in 1996, and 2023.

== Players ==
This is a list of players who have played for Switzerland in the Hopman Cup.

| Name | Total W–L | Singles W–L | Doubles W–L | First year played | No. of years played |
|---|---|---|---|---|---|
| Belinda Bencic | 15–7 | 6–5 | 9–2 | 2017 | 3 |
| Roger Federer | 27–9 | 14–4 | 13–5 | 2001 | 5 |
| Ivo Heuberger | 1–5 | 0–3 | 1–2 | 1999 | 1 |
| Martina Hingis | 21–6 | 14–0 | 7–6 | 1996 | 4 |
| Jakob Hlasek | 9–5 | 5–2 | 4–3 | 1991 | 3 |
| Manuela Maleeva-Fragniere | 11–7 | 6–3 | 5–4 | 1991 | 4 |
| Claudio Mezzadri | 2–2 | 1–1 | 1–1 | 1993 | 1 |
| Céline Naef | 2–3 | 0–3 | 2–0 | 2023 | 1 |
| Leandro Riedi | 4–1 | 2–1 | 2–0 | 2023 | 1 |
| Marc Rosset | 7–5 | 4–2 | 3–3 | 1996 | 2 |
| Miroslava Vavrinec | 1–5 | 0–3 | 1–2 | 2002 | 1 |

== Results ==
| Year | Competition | Location | Opponent | Score | Result |
|---|---|---|---|---|---|
| 1991 | Quarterfinals | Burswood Dome, Perth | Australia | 3–0 | Won |
| 1991 | Semifinals | Burswood Dome, Perth | United States | 1–2 | Lost |
| 1992 | Quarterfinal | Burswood Dome, Perth | (Commonwealth of Independent States) CIS | 2–1 | Won |
| 1992 | Semifinal | Burswood Dome, Perth | Spain | 3–0 | Won |
| 1992 | Final | Burswood Dome, Perth | Czechoslovakia | 2–1 | Won |
| 1993 | Round One | Burswood Dome, Perth | Japan | 2–1 | Won |
| 1993 | Quarterfinal | Burswood Dome, Perth | Spain | 0–3 | Lost |
| 1994 | Round One | Burswood Dome, Perth | Netherlands | 2–1 | Won |
| 1994 | Quarterfinal | Burswood Dome, Perth | Czech Republic | 1–2 | Lost |
| 1996 ^{1} | Round Robin | Burswood Dome, Perth | Australia | 2–1 | Won |
| 1996 ^{1} | Round Robin | Burswood Dome, Perth | Netherlands | 2–1 | Won |
| 1996 ^{1} | Round Robin | Burswood Dome, Perth | Germany | 3–0 | Won |
| 1996 ^{1} | Final | Burswood Dome, Perth | Croatia | 1–2 | Lost |
| 1997 ^{2} | Round Robin | Burswood Dome, Perth | Romania | 2–1 | Won |
| 1997 ^{2} | Round Robin | Burswood Dome, Perth | South Africa | 1–2 | Lost |
| 1997 ^{2} | Round Robin | Burswood Dome, Perth | Germany | 3–0 | Won |
| 1999 | Round Robin | Burswood Dome, Perth | Slovakia | 1–2 | Lost |
| 1999 | Round Robin | Burswood Dome, Perth | United States | 2–1 | Won |
| 1999 | Round Robin | Burswood Dome, Perth | Sweden | 1–2 | Lost |
| 2001 | Round Robin | Burswood Dome, Perth | Thailand | 3–0 | Won |
| 2001 | Round Robin | Burswood Dome, Perth | Australia | 3–0 | Won |
| 2001 | Round Robin | Burswood Dome, Perth | South Africa | 2–1 | Won |
| 2001 | Final | Burswood Dome, Perth | United States | 2–1 | Won |
| 2002 | Round Robin | Burswood Dome, Perth | Australia | 0–3 | Lost |
| 2002 | Round Robin | Burswood Dome, Perth | Spain | 0–3 | Lost |
| 2002 | Round Robin | Burswood Dome, Perth | Argentina | 2–1 | Won |
| 2017 | Round Robin | Perth Arena, Perth | Great Britain | 3–0 | Won |
| 2017 | Round Robin | Perth Arena, Perth | Germany | 2–1 | Won |
| 2017 | Round Robin | Perth Arena, Perth | France | 1–2 | Lost |
| 2018 | Round Robin | Perth Arena, Perth | Japan | 3–0 | Won |
| 2018 | Round Robin | Perth Arena, Perth | Russia | 3–0 | Won |
| 2018 | Round Robin | Perth Arena, Perth | United States | 3–0 | Won |
| 2018 | Final | Perth Arena, Perth | Germany | 2–1 | Won |
| 2019 | Round Robin | Perth Arena, Perth | Great Britain | 3–0 | Won |
| 2019 | Round Robin | Perth Arena, Perth | United States | 2–1 | Won |
| 2019 | Round Robin | Perth Arena, Perth | Greece | 1–2 | Lost |
| 2019 | Final | Perth Arena, Perth | Germany | 2–1 | Won |
| 2023 | Round Robin | Nice Lawn Tennis Club, Nice | Denmark | 2–1 | Won |
| 2023 | Round Robin | Nice Lawn Tennis Club, Nice | France | 2–1 | Won |
| 2023 | Final | Nice Lawn Tennis Club, Nice | Croatia | 0–2 | Lost |

^{1} In the 1996 final versus Croatia, the Swiss team was forced to retire from the mixed doubles with the score at 5–5 in the final set, thus handing the championship to Croatia. This was due to a hand injury sustained by the Swiss player, Marc Rosset, when he punched the backboard in frustration at having not taken match points.
^{2} In 1997, a back injury prevented Marc Rosset from competing in his singles matches in the ties against both Romania and South Africa as well as the mixed doubles against South Africa.
