= Spain at the Hopman Cup =

Sporting event delegation

Spain
- First year: 1990
- Years played: 19
- Hopman Cup titles: 4 (1990, 2002, 2010, 2013)
- Runners-up: 2 (1993, 2007)
- Most total wins: Arantxa Sánchez Vicario (21–11)
- Most singles wins: Arantxa Sánchez Vicario (12–5)
- Most doubles wins: Arantxa Sánchez Vicario (9–6); Tommy Robredo (9–3)
- Best doubles team: Anabel Medina Garrigues & Fernando Verdasco (6–0)
- Most years played: Arantxa Sánchez Vicario (7)

Spain has competed at the Hopman Cup tournament on nineteen occasions, their first appearance coming at the 2nd annual staging of the event in 1990. They have won the tournament four times: in 1990, 2002, 2010 and 2013. They were also runners-up on two occasions: in 1993 and 2007.

== Players ==
This is a list of players who have played for Spain in the Hopman Cup.

| Name | Total W–L | Singles W–L | Doubles W–L | First year played | No. of years played |
|---|---|---|---|---|---|
| Carlos Alcaraz | 2–2 | 2–0 | 0–2 | 2023 | 1 |
| Lara Arruabarrena | 3–3 | 1–2 | 2–1 | 2017 | 1 |
| Marina Bassols Ribera | 1–3 | 1–1 | 0–2 | 2025 | 1 |
| Roberto Bautista Agut | 1–3 | 1–1 | 0–2 | 2025 | 1 |
| Albert Costa | 0–2 | 0–1 | 0–1 | 1995 | 1 |
| David Ferrer | 2−3 | 2−1 | 0−2 | 2019 | 1 |
| Feliciano López | 3–3 | 1–2 | 2–1 | 2017 | 1 |
| Conchita Martínez | 1–3 | 0–2 | 1–1 | 1994 | 2 |
| María José Martínez Sánchez | 6–1 | 3–1 | 3–0 | 2010 | 1 |
| Rebeka Masarova | 0–4 | 0–2 | 0–2 | 2023 | 1 |
| Anabel Medina Garrigues | 14–10 | 6–7 | 8–3 | 2007 | 4 |
| Carlos Moyá | 3–6 | 1–4 | 2–2 | 1998 | 2 |
| Garbiñe Muguruza | 1−4 | 1−2 | 0−2 | 2019 | 1 |
| Daniel Muñoz de la Nava | 0–4 | 0–2 | 0–2 | 2014 | 1 |
| Tommy Robredo | 20–6 | 11–3 | 9–3 | 2002 | 4 |
| Virginia Ruano Pascual | 1–5 | 0–3 | 1–2 | 2003 | 1 |
| Emilio Sánchez | 8–11 | 3–7 | 5–4 | 1990 | 5 |
| Arantxa Sánchez Vicario | 21–11 | 12–5 | 9–6 | 1990 | 7 |
| Fernando Verdasco | 9–4 | 3–4 | 6–0 | 2012 | 2 |

== Results ==
| Year | Phase | Location | Opponent | Score | Result |
|---|---|---|---|---|---|
| 1990 | Quarter-finals | Burswood Dome, Perth | Austria | 2–1 | Won |
| 1990 | Semi-finals | Burswood Dome, Perth | Czechoslovakia | 2–1 | Won |
| 1990 | Final | Burswood Dome, Perth | United States | 2–1 | Won |
| 1991 | Quarter-finals | Burswood Dome, Perth | France | 1–2 | Lost |
| 1992 | Quarter-finals | Burswood Dome, Perth | Netherlands | 2–1 | Won |
| 1992 | Semi-finals | Burswood Dome, Perth | Switzerland | 0–3 | Lost |
| 1993 ^{1} | Quarter-finals | Burswood Dome, Perth | Switzerland | 2–1 | Won |
| 1993 ^{1} | Semi-finals | Burswood Dome, Perth | Czech Republic | 2–1 | Won |
| 1993 ^{1} | Final | Burswood Dome, Perth | Germany | 1–2 | Lost |
| 1994 | Quarter-finals | Burswood Dome, Perth | Austria | 1–2 | Lost |
| 1995 | Quarter-finals | Burswood Dome, Perth | France | 0–3 | Lost |
| 1998 | Round Robin | Burswood Dome, Perth | Slovakia | 2–1 | Won |
| 1998 | Round Robin | Burswood Dome, Perth | Australia | 1–2 | Lost |
| 1998 | Round Robin | Burswood Dome, Perth | Sweden | 2–1 | Won |
| 1999 ^{2} | Round Robin | Burswood Dome, Perth | France | 1–2 | Lost |
| 1999 ^{2} | Round Robin | Burswood Dome, Perth | Australia | 0–3 | Lost |
| 2002 ^{3} | Round Robin | Burswood Dome, Perth | Argentina | 3–0 | Won |
| 2002 ^{3} | Round Robin | Burswood Dome, Perth | Switzerland | 3–0 | Won |
| 2002 ^{3} | Round Robin | Burswood Dome, Perth | Australia | 3–0 | Won |
| 2002 ^{3} | Final | Burswood Dome, Perth | United States | 2–1 | Won |
| 2003 | Round Robin | Burswood Dome, Perth | Belgium | 1–2 | Lost |
| 2003 | Round Robin | Burswood Dome, Perth | United States | 0–3 | Lost |
| 2003 | Round Robin | Burswood Dome, Perth | Uzbekistan | 2–1 | Won |
| 2007 ^{4} | Round Robin | Burswood Dome, Perth | Croatia | 3–0 | Won |
| 2007 ^{4} | Round Robin | Burswood Dome, Perth | Czech Republic | 1–2 | Lost |
| 2007 ^{4} | Round Robin | Burswood Dome, Perth | India | 2–1 | Won |
| 2007 ^{4} | Final | Burswood Dome, Perth | Russia | 0–2 | Lost |
| 2010 ^{5} | Round Robin | Burswood Dome, Perth | United States | 3–0 | Won |
| 2010 ^{5} | Round Robin | Burswood Dome, Perth | Romania | 3–0 | Won |
| 2010 ^{5} | Round Robin | Burswood Dome, Perth | Australia | 3–0 | Won |
| 2010 ^{5} | Final | Burswood Dome, Perth | Great Britain | 2–1 | Won |
| 2012 | Round Robin | Burswood Dome, Perth | Australia | 2–1 | Won |
| 2012 | Round Robin | Burswood Dome, Perth | China | 2–1 | Won |
| 2012 | Round Robin | Burswood Dome, Perth | France | 0–2 | Lost |
| 2013 | Round Robin | Perth Arena, Perth | South Africa | 2–1 | Won |
| 2013 | Round Robin | Perth Arena, Perth | France | 2–1 | Won |
| 2013 | Round Robin | Perth Arena, Perth | United States | 2–1 | Won |
| 2013 | Final | Perth Arena, Perth | Serbia | 2–1 | Won |
| 2014 | Round Robin | Perth Arena, Perth | Czech Republic | 0–3 | Lost |
| 2014 | Round Robin | Perth Arena, Perth | United States | 0–3 | Lost |
| 2014 | Round Robin | Perth Arena, Perth | France | 0–3 | Lost |
| 2017 | Round Robin | Perth Arena, Perth | Australia | 2–1 | Won |
| 2017 | Round Robin | Perth Arena, Perth | United States | 0–3 | Lost |
| 2017 | Round Robin | Perth Arena, Perth | Czech Republic | 2–1 | Won |
| 2019 | Round Robin | Perth Arena, Perth | Germany | 0–3 | Lost |
| 2019 | Round Robin | Perth Arena, Perth | Australia | 1–2 | Lost |
| 2019 | Round Robin | Perth Arena, Perth | France | 2–1 | Won |
| 2023 | Round Robin | Nice Lawn Tennis Club, Nice | Belgium | 1–2 | Lost |
| 2023 | Round Robin | Nice Lawn Tennis Club, Nice | Croatia | 1–2 | Lost |
| 2025 | Round Robin | Fiera del Levante, Bari | Greece | 2–1 | Won |
| 2025 | Round Robin | Fiera del Levante, Bari | Canada | 0–3 | Lost |

^{1} Having already won the two singles rubbers and thus the title, Germany conceded the mixed doubles dead rubber against Spain in the 1993 final. This gave the Germans a 2–1 victory overall.
^{2} In 1999, Spain did not compete in their final tie against South Africa. They were instead replaced by Zimbabwe.
^{3} In 2002, Spain's final round robin tie against Australia was cancelled, with Australia giving Spain a 3–0 walkover. This was due to Australian opponent, Lleyton Hewitt, being diagnosed with chicken pox and being unable to compete. The women's singles match was, however, played as an exhibition match.
^{4} In the 2007 final against Russia, the mixed doubles dead rubber was not played.
^{5} In the tie against Romania in 2010, opponent Victor Hănescu was forced to retire during the men's singles and forfeit the mixed doubles, contributing two points to Spain's 3–0 victory over Romania. ^{6} In the 2012 tie against France, the dead mixed doubles rubber was not played.
