= Ukraine at the Hopman Cup =

Sporting event delegation

Ukraine
- First year: 1993
- Years played: 4
- Hopman Cup titles: 0
- Runners-up: 2 (1995, 2016)
- Most total wins: Andrei Medvedev (6–6)
- Most singles wins: Andrei Medvedev (4–3)
- Most doubles wins: Natalia Medvedeva (2–3); Andrei Medvedev (2–3)
- Best doubles team: Natalia Medvedeva & Andrei Medvedev (2–3)
- Most years played: Natalia Medvedeva (3); Andrei Medvedev (3)

Ukraine is a nation that has competed at the Hopman Cup tournament on four occasions, the first being in 1993. In 1995 and 2016, Ukraine were the tournament runners-up and this remains their best showing to date. Before its dissolution, Ukraine used to form part of the Soviet Union which also competed at the Hopman Cup on two occasions in the early 1990s. Additionally, Ukraine is a member of the CIS which entered a CIS team into the 1992 event.

== Players ==
This is a list of players who have played for Ukraine in the Hopman Cup.

Name	Total W–L	Singles W–L	Doubles W–L	First year played	No. of years played
Alexandr Dolgopolov	3–4	3–1	0–3	2016	1
Andrei Medvedev	6–6	4–3	2–3	1993	3
Natalia Medvedeva	5–7	3–4	2–3	1993	3
Elina Svitolina	3–4	3–1	0–3	2016	1

== Results ==
Year	Competition	Location	Opponent	Score	Result
1993	Round One	Burswood Dome, Perth	Austria	2–1	Won
1993	Quarterfinals	Burswood Dome, Perth	Germany	1–2	Lost
1994 ^{1}	Round One	Burswood Dome, Perth	Austria	0–3	Lost
1995 ^{2}	Round One	Burswood Dome, Perth	Sweden	2–1	Won
1995 ^{2}	Quarterfinals	Burswood Dome, Perth	United States	2–1	Won
1995 ^{2}	Semifinals	Burswood Dome, Perth	Czech Republic	2–1	Won
1995 ^{2}	Final	Burswood Dome, Perth	Germany	0–2	Lost
2016	Round Robin	Perth Arena, Perth	United States	2–1	Won
2016	Round Robin	Perth Arena, Perth	Czech Republic	2–1	Won
2016	Round Robin	Perth Arena, Perth	Australia Gold	2–1	Won
2016	Final	Perth Arena, Perth	Australia Green	0–2	Lost

^{1} As Andrei Medvedev and Natalia Medvedeva had already lost both of their singles matches, the mixed doubles dead rubber was not played.
^{2} In the final against Germany, the mixed doubles dead rubber was not played as Andrei Medvedev and Natalia Medvedeva had already lost both of their singles matches.

== See also ==
CIS at the Hopman Cup
Soviet Union at the Hopman Cup
