= Germany at the Hopman Cup =

Sporting event delegation

Germany
- First year: 1989
- Years played: 18
- Hopman Cup titles: 2 (1993, 1995)
- Runners-up: 2 (1994, 2018, 2019)
- Most total wins: Anke Huber (13–12)
- Most singles wins: Anke Huber (10–3)
- Most doubles wins: Alexander Zverev (6–8)
- Best doubles team: Angelique Kerber & Alexander Zverev (4–4)
- Most years played: Anke Huber; Alexander Zverev (4)

Germany has competed at fourteen Hopman Cup tournaments. It first competed in the inaugural Hopman Cup in 1989, as West Germany. Germany reached the final round in three consecutive years between 1993 and 1995, finishing as the runners-up in 1994 but winning the tournament on the other two occasions.

== Players ==
This is a list of players who have played for Germany in the Hopman Cup.

Name	Total W–L	Singles W–L	Doubles W–L	First year	Years played
Boris Becker	5–3	5–0	0–3	1992	2
Petra Begerow	0–6	0–3	0–3	1997	1
Isabel Cueto	1–1	1–0	0–1	1991	1
Steffi Graf	8–4	6–1	2–3	1989	3
Anna-Lena Grönefeld	4–6	1–5	3–1	2005	2
Tommy Haas	5–10	3–6	2–4	1998	3
Anke Huber	13–12	10–3	3–9	1994	4
Bernd Karbacher	5–9	3–4	2–5	1994	2
Angelique Kerber	12–4	8–0	4–4	2018	2
Nicolas Kiefer	3–6	2–3	1–3	2006	2
Philipp Kohlschreiber	0–5	0–3	0–2	2010	1
Patrik Kühnen	2–2	1–1	1–1	1989	1
Sabine Lisicki	5–10	4–5	1–5	2009	3
Tatjana Malek	0–4	0–2	0–2	2013	1
Andrea Petkovic	2–5	1–3	1–2	2013	2
Martin Sinner	2–4	1–2	1–2	1996	1
Carl-Uwe Steeb	0–2	0–1	0–1	1991	1
Michael Stich	3–2	2–1	1–1	1993	1
Alexander Zverev	13–15	7–7	6–8	2016	4

== Results ==
Year	Competition	Location	Opponent	Score	Result
1989	Round One	Burswood Dome, Perth	France	3–0	Won
1989	Semifinals	Burswood Dome, Perth	Australia	1–2	Lost
1991	Round One	Burswood Dome, Perth	Czechoslovakia	1–2	Lost
1992	Quarterfinals	Burswood Dome, Perth	France	2–1	Won
1992	Semifinals	Burswood Dome, Perth	Czechoslovakia	1–2	Lost
1993	Quarterfinals	Burswood Dome, Perth	Ukraine	2–1	Won
1993	Semifinals	Burswood Dome, Perth	France	2–1	Won
1993	Final	Burswood Dome, Perth	Spain	2–1	Won
1994	Round One	Burswood Dome, Perth	South Africa	2–1	Won
1994	Quarterfinals	Burswood Dome, Perth	United States	2–1	Won
1994	Semifinals	Burswood Dome, Perth	Austria	2–1	Won
1994	Final	Burswood Dome, Perth	Czech Republic	1–2	Lost
1995	Quarterfinals	Burswood Dome, Perth	Austria	2–1	Won
1995	Semifinals	Burswood Dome, Perth	France	2–1	Won
1995	Final	Burswood Dome, Perth	Ukraine	3–0	Won
1996	Round Robin	Burswood Dome, Perth	Netherlands	2–1	Won
1996	Round Robin	Burswood Dome, Perth	Australia	2–1	Won
1996	Round Robin	Burswood Dome, Perth	Switzerland	0–3	Lost
1997	Round Robin	Burswood Dome, Perth	South Africa	0–3	Lost
1997	Round Robin	Burswood Dome, Perth	Romania	0–3	Lost
1997	Round Robin	Burswood Dome, Perth	Switzerland	0–3	Lost
1998	Round Robin	Burswood Dome, Perth	France	0–3	Lost
1998	Round Robin	Burswood Dome, Perth	South Africa	1–2	Lost
1998	Round Robin	Burswood Dome, Perth	United States	1–2	Lost
2005 ^{1}	Round Robin	Burswood Dome, Perth	Russia	2–1	Won
2005 ^{1}	Round Robin	Burswood Dome, Perth	Italy	2–1	Won
2005 ^{1}	Round Robin	Burswood Dome, Perth	Argentina	1–2	Lost
2006 ^{2}	Round Robin	Burswood Dome, Perth	Australia	2–1	Won
2006 ^{2}	Round Robin	Burswood Dome, Perth	Argentina	1–2	Lost
2006 ^{2}	Round Robin	Burswood Dome, Perth	Netherlands	0–3	Lost
2009 ^{3}	Round Robin	Burswood Dome, Perth	Australia	2–1	Won
2009 ^{3}	Round Robin	Burswood Dome, Perth	United States	2–1	Won
2009 ^{3}	Round Robin	Burswood Dome, Perth	Slovakia	0–3	Lost
2010 ^{4}	Round Robin	Burswood Dome, Perth	Russia	1–2	Lost
2010 ^{4}	Round Robin	Burswood Dome, Perth	Great Britain	1–2	Lost
2010 ^{4}	Round Robin	Burswood Dome, Perth	Kazakhstan	0–2	Lost
2013 ^{5}	Round Robin	Perth Arena, Perth	Australia	0-3	Lost
2013 ^{5}	Round Robin	Perth Arena, Perth	Italy	1–2	Lost
2013 ^{5}	Round Robin	Perth Arena, Perth	Serbia	0–3	Lost
2016	Round Robin	Perth Arena, Perth	Australia	0–3	Lost
2016	Round Robin	Perth Arena, Perth	France	2–1	Won
2016	Round Robin	Perth Arena, Perth	Great Britain	0–2	Lost
2017	Round Robin	Perth Arena, Perth	France	1–2	Lost
2017	Round Robin	Perth Arena, Perth	Switzerland	1–2	Lost
2017	Round Robin	Perth Arena, Perth	Great Britain	2–1	Won
2018	Round Robin	Perth Arena, Perth	Belgium	2–1	Won
2018	Round Robin	Perth Arena, Perth	Canada	3–0	Won
2018	Round Robin	Perth Arena, Perth	Australia	2–1	Won
2018	Final	Perth Arena, Perth	Switzerland	1–2	Lost
2019	Round Robin	Perth Arena, Perth	Spain	3–0	Won
2019	Round Robin	Perth Arena, Perth	France	2–1	Won
2019	Round Robin	Perth Arena, Perth	Australia	2–1	Won
2019	Final	Perth Arena, Perth	Switzerland	1−2	Lost

^{1} In the last tie against Argentina, Tommy Haas strained his thigh muscle during the singles match and was both forced to retire from this match and forfeit the mixed doubles, thus defaulting both points.
^{2} Due to a back problem, Nikolas Kiefer was unable to play the final tie against the Netherlands therefore Germany had to forfeit two points.
^{3} Nikolas Kiefer tore two ligaments in his ankle during his singles match in the final tie against Slovakia. He was forced to retire from that match and was unable to participate in the mixed doubles, thus losing both points.
^{4} The mixed doubles in the final tie against Kazakhstan was not played.
^{5} Andrea Petkovic strained her knee and was forced to retire from this match and the mixed doubles, thus losing both points and was replaced by Tajana Malek. Australian junior Thanasi Kokkinakis joined the mixed third rubber match against Serbia after Haas resign.
