= 2011 Hopman Cup =

- Date: 1 January 2011 – 8 January 2011
- Edition: XXIII
- Surface: Hard (indoor)
- Location: Perth, Western Australia
- Venue: Burswood Entertainment Complex

Champions
- United States
- Hopman Cup

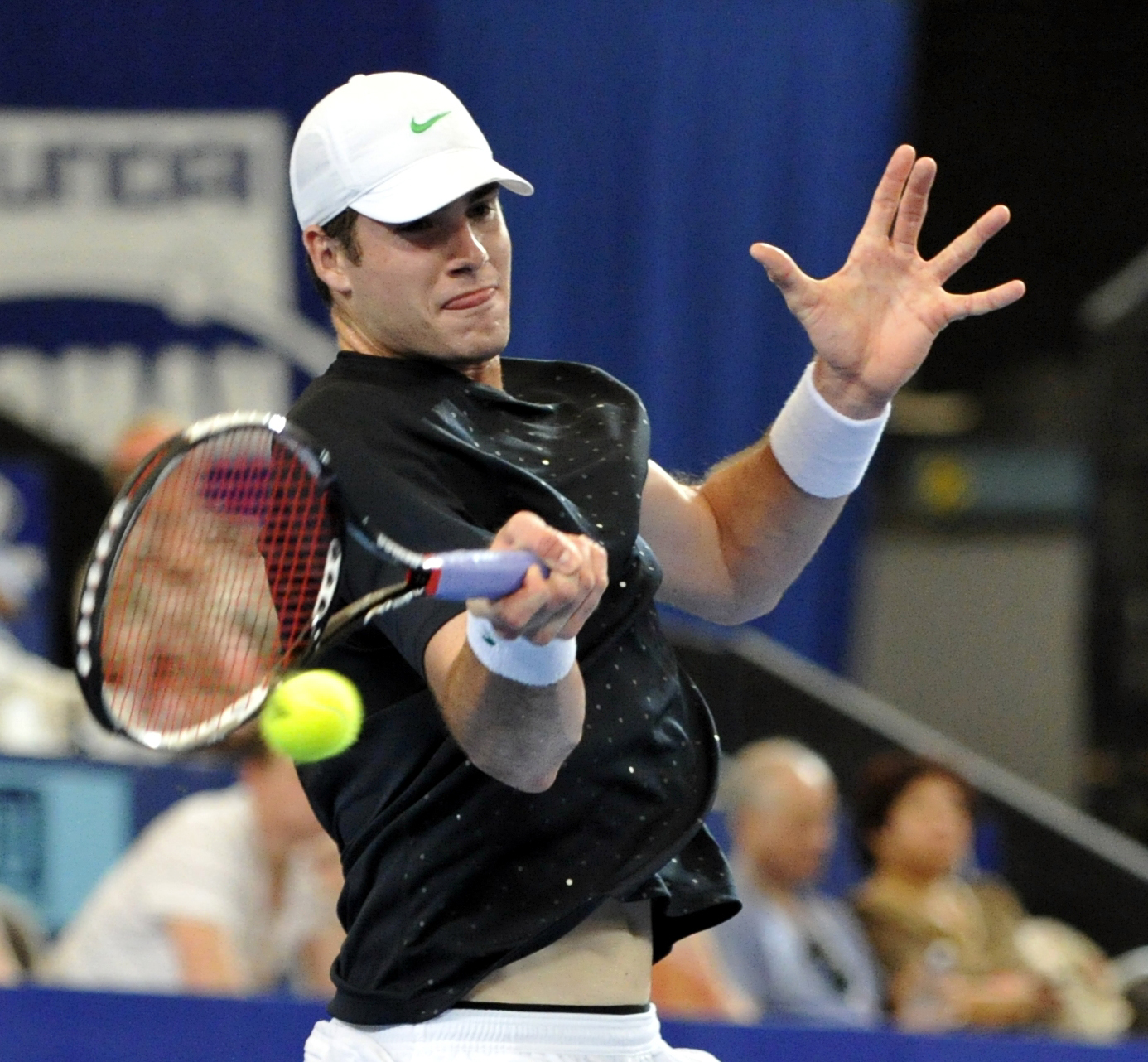
John Isner was part of the winning USA team along with Bethanie Mattek-Sands

The Hopman Cup XXIII (also known as the Hyundai Hopman Cup for sponsorship reasons) corresponds to the 23rd edition of the Hopman Cup tournament between nations in men's and women's tennis. The tournament commenced on 1 January 2011 at the Burswood Dome in Perth, Western Australia. The tournament was contested on hard courts.

The tournament was attended by over seventy eight thousand people over the course of the week. This is the biggest attendance at the Hopman Cup where the tournament was held over eleven sessions. Up until the eighteenth edition there was a play-off giving twelve sessions of play.

Eight teams competed for the title, with two round robin groups of four, from which the top team of each group progressed to the final. Spain were the 2010 champions but were not invited to defend their title. In the final the United States of America team of Bethanie Mattek-Sands and John Isner defeated Belgium's Justine Henin and Ruben Bemelmans 2–1. This was the USA's sixth Hopman Cup title.

== Tournament ==
The 2011 Hyundai Hopman Cup is an invitational tennis tournament and is also known as the Official Mixed Teams Championships of the ITF. The 2011 cup has prize money of A$1 million and follows the traditional round robin format, the leading teams after three round robin matches will qualify for the final. All matches are the best of three sets with the exception of the doubles where a match tie break, first to ten points, will be played if the match is tied at one set all. All ties will be played in this format; women's singles, men's singles and finally mixed doubles. In the event of a tie in the final group standings the following will be used to separate the nations;

- The highest total of matches won
- Best percentage of sets won and lost
- Head-to-head performances
- Toss of a coin

== Seeds ==
The seeds for the 2011 Hopman Cup were decided by tournament director Paul McNamee, Rob Casey and Geoff Masters.

1. Serbia – Ana Ivanovic / Novak Djokovic (withdrew before final match)
2. Great Britain – Laura Robson / Andy Murray (round robin)
3. Belgium – Justine Henin / Ruben Bemelmans (runners-up)
4. Italy – Francesca Schiavone / Potito Starace (round robin)

United States were originally seeded second. But when Serena Williams was replaced with Bethanie Mattek-Sands, the USA were demoted and not seeded with Italy now the number 4 seeds as Belgium and Great Britain move up a seed.

== Group A ==
=== Teams and players ===
Group A was headed by the number one seeds Serbia. Serbia was represented by Novak Djokovic and Ana Ivanovic. Djokovic is currently ranked by the Association of Tennis Professionals at number 3, and is the 2008 Australian Open champion. Djokovic comes into the tournament fresh from reaching his third grand slam final at the US Open and winning the Davis Cup as well as reaching a career high of world number two in 2010. Ivanovic is the 2008 French Open champion and former world number one as ranked by the Women's Tennis Association and 2008 Australian Open finalist. Ivanovic had a mixed 2010, she teamed up and then split with Heinz Günthardt before winning her first title in two years at Linz before picking up the Tournament of Champions in Bali she is currently the world number seventeen. The pair have played together in the Hopman Cup before in 2006, where they missed out on the final by losing two more sets when compared to America's record.

=== Standings ===
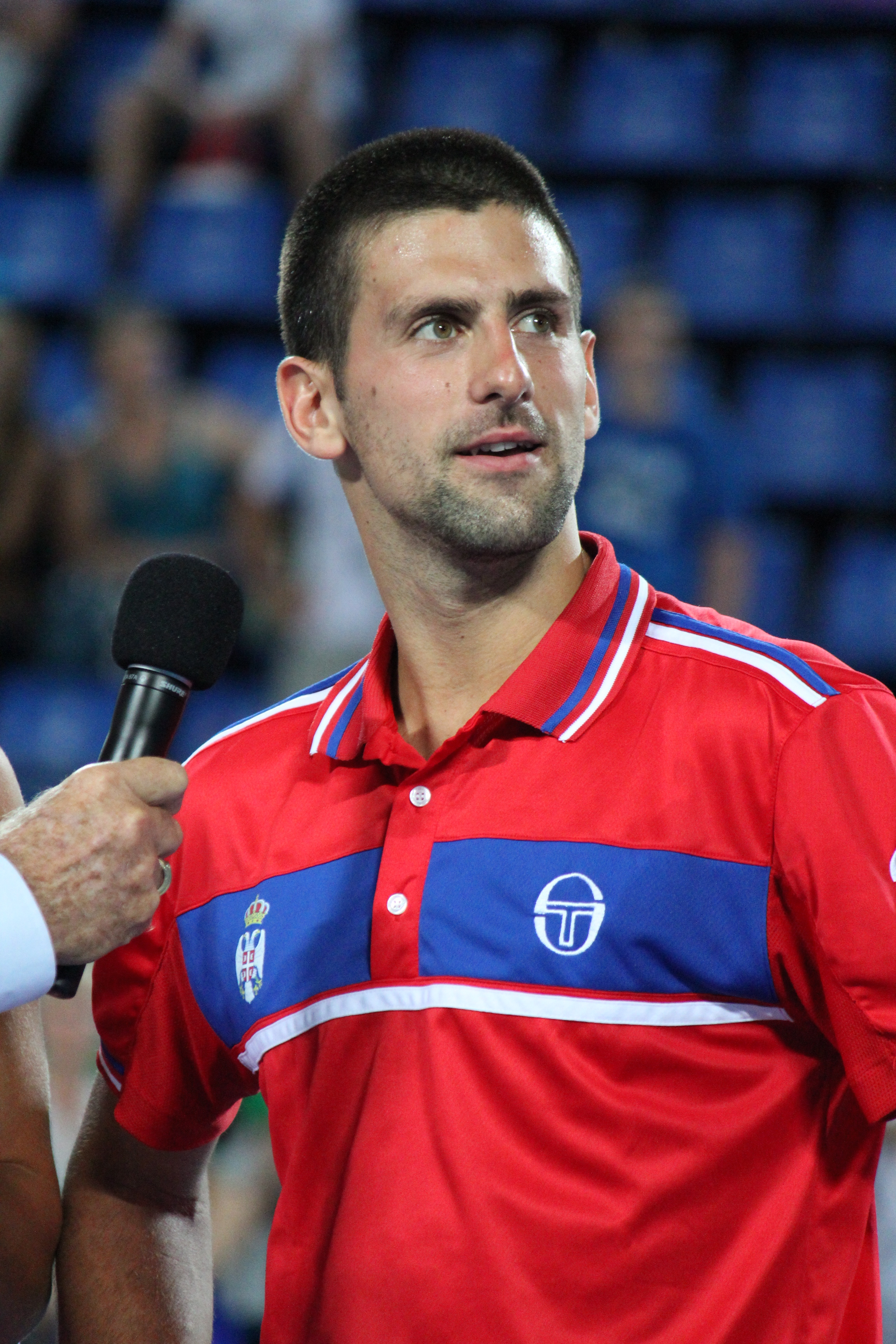
Djokovic won all three of his singles rubbers to help Serbia finish top of Group A.

| Pos. | Country | W | L | Matches | Sets |
|---|---|---|---|---|---|
| 1 | Serbia | 2 | 1 | 7–2 | 15–6 |
| 2 | Belgium | 2 | 1 | 6–3 | 13–8 |
| 3 | Australia | 2 | 1 | 5–4 | 10–9 |
| 4 | Kazakhstan | 0 | 3 | 0–9 | 2–17 |

- Note: Ruben Bemelmans replaces Steve Darcis after he tore a ligament in his ankle.
- Note: Sesil Karatantcheva replaces Yaroslava Shvedova after she injured her ankle following the tie between Kazakhstan and Serbia.

==== Australia vs. Belgium ====
Australia
2
Burswood Entertainment Complex, Perth
1 January 2011 AWST (UTC+8)
hard (indoors)

Belgium
1

| | | | 1 | 2 | 3 |
|---|---|---|---|---|---|
| 1 | (Australia) (Belgium) | Alicia Molik; Justine Henin | 4; 6 | 4; 6 |
| 2 | (Australia) (Belgium) | Lleyton Hewitt; Ruben Bemelmans | 6; 4 | 6; 3 |
| 3 | (Australia) (Belgium) | Alicia Molik / Lleyton Hewitt; Justine Henin / Ruben Bemelmans | 1; 6 | 6; 3 | 10; 8 |

==== Serbia vs. Kazakhstan ====
Serbia
3
Burswood Entertainment Complex, Perth
2 January 2011 AWST (UTC+8)
hard (indoors)

Kazakhstan
0

| | | | 1 | 2 | 3 |
|---|---|---|---|---|---|
| 1 | (Serbia) (Kazakhstan) | Ana Ivanovic; Yaroslava Shvedova | 7^{8} 6^{6} | 6; 1 |
| 2 | (Serbia) (Kazakhstan) | Novak Djokovic; Andrey Golubev | 4; 6 | 6; 3 | 6; 1 |
| 3 | (Serbia) (Kazakhstan) | Ana Ivanovic / Novak Djokovic; Yaroslava Shvedova / Andrey Golubev | 7^{7} 6^{2} | 6; 4 |

==== Belgium vs. Kazakhstan ====
Belgium
3
Burswood Entertainment Complex, Perth
4 January 2011 AWST (UTC+8)
hard (indoors)

Kazakhstan
0

| | | | 1 | 2 | 3 |
|---|---|---|---|---|---|
| 1 | (Belgium) (Kazakhstan) | Justine Henin; Sesil Karatantcheva | 6; 4 | 6; 3 |
| 2 | (Belgium) (Kazakhstan) | Ruben Bemelmans; Andrey Golubev | 6; 4 | 6; 4 |
| 3 | (Belgium) (Kazakhstan) | Justine Henin / Ruben Bemelmans; Sesil Karatantcheva / Andrey Golubev | 4; 6 | 6; 2 | 10; 8 |

==== Serbia vs. Australia ====
Serbia
3
Burswood Entertainment Complex, Perth
4 January 2011 AWST (UTC+8)
hard (indoors)

Australia
0

| | | | 1 | 2 | 3 |
|---|---|---|---|---|---|
| 1 | (Serbia) (Australia) | Ana Ivanovic; Alicia Molik | 6; 4 | 6; 0 |
| 2 | (Serbia) (Australia) | Novak Djokovic; Lleyton Hewitt | 6; 2 | 6; 4 |
| 3 | (Serbia) (Australia) | Ana Ivanovic / Novak Djokovic; Alicia Molik / Lleyton Hewitt | 6^{5} 7^{7} | 7; 5 | 10; 6 |

==== Australia vs. Kazakhstan ====
Australia
3
Burswood Entertainment Complex, Perth
6 January 2011 AWST (UTC+8)
hard (indoors)

Kazakhstan
0

| | | | 1 | 2 | 3 |
|---|---|---|---|---|---|
| 1 | (Australia) (Kazakhstan) | Lleyton Hewitt; Andrey Golubev | 6; 3 | 6; 3 |
| 2 | (Australia) (Kazakhstan) | Alicia Molik; Sesil Karatantcheva | 6; 3 | 6; 2 |
| 3 | (Australia) (Kazakhstan) | Alicia Molik / Lleyton Hewitt; Sesil Karatantcheva / Andrey Golubev | 8^{7} 7^{1} |

==== Serbia vs. Belgium ====
Serbia
1
Burswood Entertainment Complex, Perth
6 January 2011 AWST (UTC+8)
hard (indoors)

Belgium
2

| | | | 1 | 2 | 3 |
|---|---|---|---|---|---|
| 1 | (Serbia) (Belgium) | Ana Ivanovic; Justine Henin | 4; 6 | 3; 6 |
| 2 | (Serbia) (Belgium) | Novak Djokovic; Ruben Bemelmans | 6; 3 | 6; 2 |
| 3 | (Serbia) (Belgium) | Ana Ivanovic / Novak Djokovic; Justine Henin / Ruben Bemelmans | 6; 3 | 4; 6 | 4; 10 |

== Group B ==
=== Standings ===
| Pos. | Country | W | L | Matches | Sets |
|---|---|---|---|---|---|
| 1 | United States | 3 | 0 | 7–2 | 13–5 |
| 2 | France | 2 | 1 | 5–4 | 12–9 |
| 3 | Italy | 1 | 2 | 3–6 | 7–14 |
| 4 | Great Britain | 0 | 3 | 3–6 | 6–8 |

- Note: Gaël Monfils was originally selected for France, but he pulled out with a knee injury. Nicolas Mahut replaces him, setting up for the first time a rematch of his Wimbledon clash with John Isner.

==== Great Britain vs. Italy ====
Great Britain
1
Burswood Entertainment Complex, Perth
3 January 2011 AWST (UTC+8)
hard (indoors)

Italy
2

| | | | 1 | 2 | 3 |
|---|---|---|---|---|---|
| 1 | (United Kingdom) (Italy) | Laura Robson; Francesca Schiavone | 5; 7 | 3; 6 |
| 2 | (United Kingdom) (Italy) | Andy Murray; Potito Starace | 7; 5 | 6; 1 |
| 3 | (United Kingdom) (Italy) | Laura Robson / Andy Murray; Francesca Schiavone / Potito Starace | 7^{7} 6^{1} | 6^{6} 7^{8} | 2; 10 |

==== USA vs. France ====
United States
3
Burswood Entertainment Complex, Perth
3 January 2011 AWST (UTC+8)
hard (indoors)

France
0

| | | | 1 | 2 | 3 |
|---|---|---|---|---|---|
| 1 | (United States) (France) | Bethanie Mattek-Sands; Kristina Mladenovic | 3; 6 | 6; 3 | 6; 1 |
| 2 | (United States) (France) | John Isner; Nicolas Mahut | 6; 3 | 7^{7} 6^{5} |
| 3 | (United States) (France) | Bethanie Mattek-Sands / John Isner; Kristina Mladenovic / Nicolas Mahut | 2; 6 | 6; 3 | 10; 8 |

==== USA vs. Italy ====
United States
2
Burswood Entertainment Complex, Perth
5 January 2011 AWST (UTC+8)
hard (indoors)

Italy
1

| | | | 1 | 2 | 3 |
|---|---|---|---|---|---|
| 1 | (United States) (Italy) | Bethanie Mattek-Sands; Francesca Schiavone | 6; 4 | 6; 4 |
| 2 | (United States) (Italy) | John Isner; Potito Starace | 7^{7} 6^{5} | 4; 6 | 6; 4 |
| 3 | (United States) (Italy) | Bethanie Mattek-Sands / John Isner; Francesca Schiavone / Potito Starace | 7^{7} 6^{5} | 2; 6 | 3; 10 |

==== Great Britain vs. France ====
Great Britain
1
Burswood Entertainment Complex, Perth
5 January 2011 AWST (UTC+8)
hard (indoors)

France
2

| | | | 1 | 2 | 3 |
|---|---|---|---|---|---|
| 1 | (United Kingdom) (France) | Laura Robson; Kristina Mladenovic | 4; 6 | 6; 3 | 0; 6 |
| 2 | (United Kingdom) (France) | Andy Murray; Nicolas Mahut | 7^{7} 6^{3} | 7^{7} 6^{4} |
| 3 | (United Kingdom) (France) | Laura Robson / Andy Murray; Kristina Mladenovic / Nicolas Mahut | 4; 6 | 2; 6 |

==== Italy vs. France ====
Italy
0
Burswood Entertainment Complex, Perth
7 January 2011 AWST (UTC+8)
hard (indoors)

France
3

| | | | 1 | 2 | 3 |
|---|---|---|---|---|---|---|
| 1 | (Italy) (France) | Francesca Schiavone; Kristina Mladenovic | 4; 4 | | | retired |
| 2 | (Italy) (France) | Potito Starace; Nicolas Mahut | 3; 6 | 6^{2} 7^{7} |
| 3 | (Italy) (France) | Francesca Schiavone / Potito Starace; Kristina Mladenovic / Nicolas Mahut | | | | w/o |

==== USA vs. Great Britain ====
United States
2
Burswood Entertainment Complex, Perth
7 January 2011 AWST (UTC+8)
hard (indoors)

Great Britain
1

| | | | 1 | 2 | 3 |
|---|---|---|---|---|---|---|
| 1 | (United States) (United Kingdom) | Bethanie Mattek-Sands; Laura Robson | 6; 4 | 6; 2 |
| 2 | (United States) (United Kingdom) | John Isner; Andy Murray | 4; 6 | 2; 6 |
| 3 | (United States) (United Kingdom) | Bethanie Mattek-Sands / John Isner; Laura Robson / Andy Murray | | | | w/o |

== Final ==
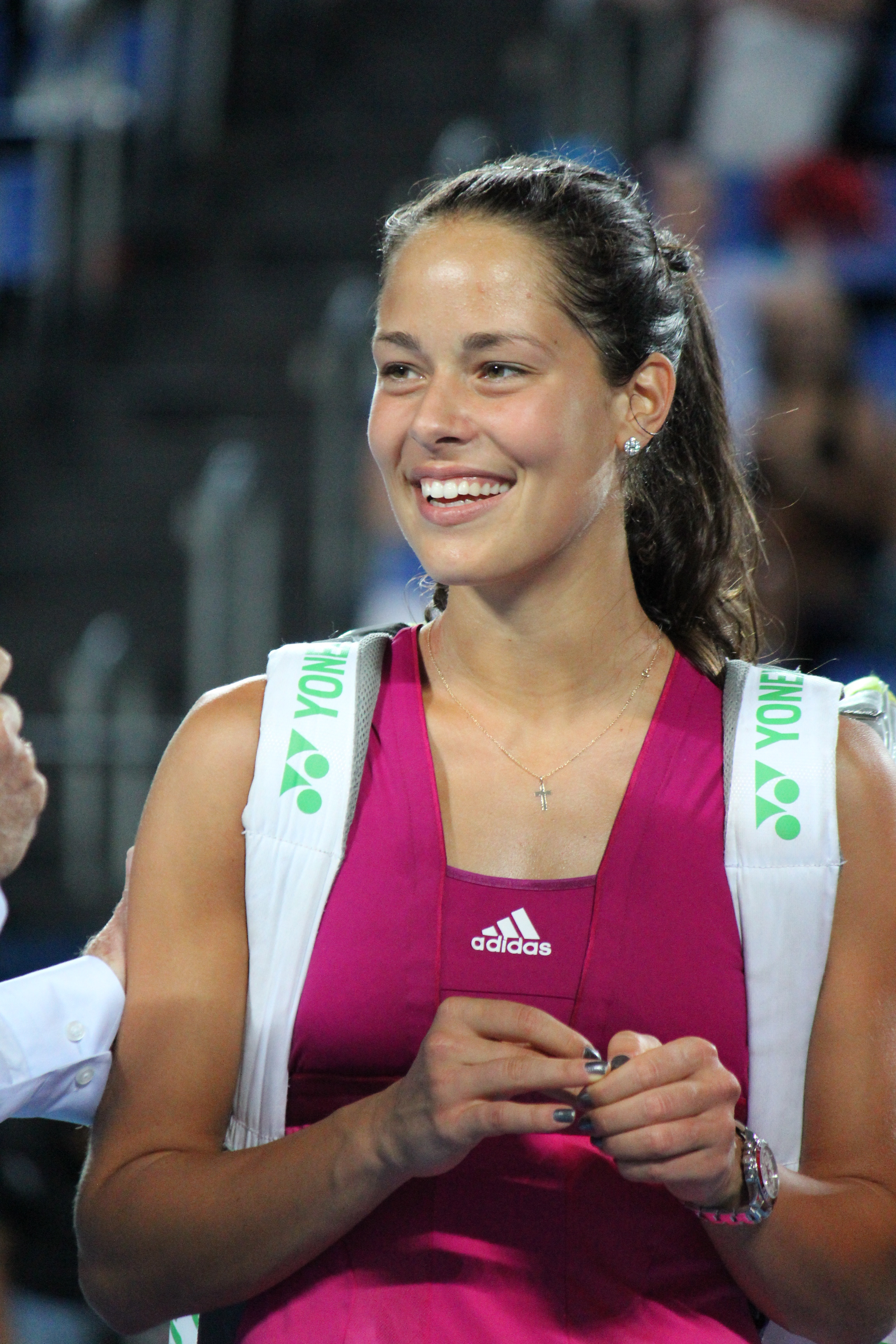
Ivanovic was part of the Serbian team that reached the final, but then withdrew because of her injury.

Serbia qualified for the final after winning their opening two matches, 3–0. They needed just one rubber against Belgium to qualify. After Henin beat Ana Ivanovic, Novak Djokovic booked Serbia's second trip to the Hopman Cup final defeating Bemelmans in straight sets. However, due to Ivanovic having an abdominal strain injury, Belgium replaced Serbia in the final, sneaking in above Australia because of their 2–1 win in the last rubber of the group. The United States of America qualified, after Bethanie Mattek-Sands won her singles match giving the USA the one rubber they needed to win the group; coupled with Francesca Schiavone's retirement from the opening rubber of the other tie; which ended Italy's chances of qualifying for the final. This meant that the USA needed to win one rubber to eliminate France.

=== Belgium vs USA ===
Belgium
1
Burswood Entertainment Complex, Perth
8 January 2011 AWST (UTC+8)
hard (indoors)

United States
2

| | | | 1 | 2 | 3 |
|---|---|---|---|---|---|
| 1 | (Belgium) (United States) | Justine Henin; Bethanie Mattek-Sands | 7^{8} 6^{6} | 6; 3 |
| 2 | (Belgium) (United States) | Ruben Bemelmans; John Isner | 3; 6 | 4; 6 |
| 3 | (Belgium) (United States) | Justine Henin / Ruben Bemelmans; Bethanie Mattek-Sands / John Isner | 1; 6 | 3; 6 |

2011 Hopman Cup Champions
(United States)
United States
Sixth title
