= Romania at the Hopman Cup =

Sporting event delegation

Romania
- First year: 1997
- Years played: 1
- Best finish: 4th in group (1997, 2010)
- Most total wins: Irina Spîrlea (4–4)
- Most singles wins: Irina Spîrlea (2–2)
- Most doubles wins: Irina Spîrlea (2–2)
- Best doubles team: Cîrstea & Hănescu (1–0); Spîrlea & Pescariu (1–0)
- Most years played: Irina Spîrlea (2)

Romania is a nation that has competed at the Hopman Cup tennis tournament on three occasions, the first of which was at the 9th annual staging of the tournament in 1997, when they finished fourth in their group. They replicated this result in 2010 and to date they have not yet bettered it.

== Players ==
This is a list of players who have played for Romania in the Hopman Cup.

Name	Total W–L	Singles W–L	Doubles W–L	First year played	No. of years played
Sorana Cîrstea	2–2	1–2	1–0	2010	1
Victor Hănescu	1–2	0–2	1–0	2010	1
Dinu Pescariu	1–1	0–1	1–0	1998	1
Irina Spîrlea	4–4	2–2	2–2	1997	2
Adrian Voinea	2–3	1–1	1–2	1997	1

== Results ==
Year	Competition	Location	Opponent	Score	Result
1997 ^{1}	Round Robin	Burswood Dome, Perth	Switzerland	1–2	Lost
1997 ^{1}	Round Robin	Burswood Dome, Perth	Germany	3–0	Won
1997 ^{1}	Round Robin	Burswood Dome, Perth	South Africa	1–2	Lost
1998	Qualification Play-Off	Burswood Dome, Perth	Slovakia	1–2	Lost
2010 ^{2}	Round Robin	Burswood Dome, Perth	Australia	2–1	Won
2010 ^{2}	Round Robin	Burswood Dome, Perth	Spain	0–3	Lost
2010 ^{2}	Round Robin	Burswood Dome, Perth	United States	0–3	Lost

^{1} In the men's singles in the 1997 tie against Switzerland, the Swiss opponent Marc Rosset chose not to compete and conceded the point to Romania.
^{2} In the 2010 ties against Spain and the United States, Victor Hănescu was unable to compete due to injury, giving the each opposing nation a two-point advantage.
