= 2016 Hopman Cup =

- Date: 3–9 January 2016
- Edition: XXVIII (28th)
- Surface: Hard (indoor)
- Location: Perth, Western Australia
- Venue: Perth Arena

Champions
- Australia
- Hopman Cup

The Hopman Cup XXVIII was the 28th edition of the Hopman Cup tournament between nations in men's and women's tennis. It took place at the Perth Arena in Perth, Western Australia.

Eight teams competed for the title, with two round robin groups of four, from which the top team of each group advanced to the final. For the first time, there were two Australian teams, Australia Green (representing 25 and under) and Australia Gold (representing the veterans). The original full line-up of entrants was announced in October. Originally, Lleyton Hewitt and Casey Dellacqua were supposed to represent Australia Gold, but Dellacqua was replaced by Jarmila Wolfe. Other replacements are Kenny de Schepper for Gaël Monfils in the French team, Karolína Plíšková for Lucie Šafářová in the Czech team.

The 2015 champions Poland did not return to defend their title. The competition was won by Australia Green.

== Entrants ==
=== Seeds ===
Seed	Team	Female player	WTA^{1}	Male player	ATP^{1}	Total	Elimination
1	United States	Serena Williams	1	Jack Sock	30	31	Round-robin
2	Czech Republic	Karolína Plíšková	9	Jiří Veselý	40	49	Round-robin
3	Ukraine	Elina Svitolina	18	Alexandr Dolgopolov	35	53	Runners-up
4	Great Britain	Heather Watson	62	Andy Murray	3	65	Round-robin
5	Australia Green	Daria Gavrilova	35	Nick Kyrgios	34	69	Champions
6	Germany	Sabine Lisicki	30	Alexander Zverev	78	108	Round-robin
7	France	Caroline Garcia	39	Kenny de Schepper	133	172	Round-robin
8	Australia Gold	Jarmila Wolfe	100	Lleyton Hewitt	291	391	Round-robin
^{1} – ATP and WTA rankings as of 5 October 2015 (latest before draw date)

=== Replacement players ===
Pre-tournament replacement
Team	Replacement	Original player	Reason
Australia Gold	Jarmila Wolfe	Casey Dellacqua	Concussion
Czech Republic	Karolína Plíšková	Lucie Šafářová	Illness
France	Kenny de Schepper	Gaël Monfils	Leg injury
In-tournament partial replacement
United States	Victoria Duval	Serena Williams	Knee inflammation

== Group stage ==
=== Group A ===
All times are local (UTC+8).

==== Standings ====
	Australia Gold	Czech Republic	Ukraine	United States	RR W–L	Matches W–L	Sets W–L	Games W–L	Standings
Australia Gold		0–3	1–2	3–0	1–2	4–5	10–11	103–104	3
Czech Republic	3–0		1–2	1–2	1–2	5–4	12–10	122–108	2
Ukraine	2–1	2–1		2–1	3–0	6–3	13–7	105–89	1
United States	0–3	2–1	1–2		1–2	3–6	7–14	86–115	4

==== Australia Gold vs. Czech Republic ====
Australia
0
Perth Arena, Perth
3 January 2016, 17:30
Hard (i)

Czech Republic
3

			1	2	3
1	(Australia) (Czech Republic)	Lleyton Hewitt; Jiří Veselý	3; 6	7^{7} 6^{1}	4; 6
2	(Australia) (Czech Republic)	Jarmila Wolfe; Karolína Plíšková	5; 7	3; 6
3	(Australia) (Czech Republic)	Jarmila Wolfe / Lleyton Hewitt; Karolína Plíšková / Jiří Veselý	2; 6	5; 7

==== Ukraine vs. United States ====
Ukraine
2
Perth Arena, Perth
4 January 2016, 10:00
Hard (i)

United States
1

			1	2	3
1	(Ukraine) (United States)	Elina Svitolina; Victoria Duval	6; 4	6; 1
2	(Ukraine) (United States)	Alexandr Dolgopolov; Jack Sock	6; 4	6; 2
3	(Ukraine) (United States)	Elina Svitolina / Alexandr Dolgopolov; Victoria Duval / Jack Sock	2; 6	3; 6

==== Czech Republic vs. Ukraine ====
Czech Republic
1
Perth Arena, Perth
5 January 2016, 10:00
Hard (i)

Ukraine
2

			1	2	3
1	(Czech Republic) (Ukraine)	Karolína Plíšková; Elina Svitolina	5; 7	2; 6
2	(Czech Republic) (Ukraine)	Jiří Veselý; Alexandr Dolgopolov	5; 7	6^{3} 7^{7}
3	(Czech Republic) (Ukraine)	Karolína Plíšková / Jiří Veselý; Elina Svitolina / Alexandr Dolgopolov	6; 3	6; 1

==== Australia Gold vs. United States ====
Australia
3
Perth Arena, Perth
5 January 2016, 17:30
Hard (i)

United States
0

			1	2	3
1	(Australia) (United States)	Jarmila Wolfe; Serena Williams	7; 5	2; 1		retired
2	(Australia) (United States)	Lleyton Hewitt; Jack Sock	7; 5	6; 4
3	(Australia) (United States)	Jarmila Wolfe / Lleyton Hewitt; Victoria Duval / Jack Sock	7^{7} 6^{4}	6; 1

Serena Williams was unable to participate in the mixed doubles rubber, Aus Gold was awarded a 6–0, 6–0 win. However, a match was still played in which the score was 7^{7}-6^{4}, 6–1 to Australia (see above).

==== Australia Gold vs. Ukraine ====
Ukraine
2
Perth Arena, Perth
7 January 2016, 10:00
Hard (i)

Australia
1

			1	2	3
1	(Ukraine) (Australia)	Elina Svitolina; Jarmila Wolfe	6; 3	6; 3
2	(Ukraine) (Australia)	Alexandr Dolgopolov; Lleyton Hewitt	4; 6	6; 3	6; 4
3	(Ukraine) (Australia)	Elina Svitolina / Alexandr Dolgopolov; Jarmila Wolfe / Lleyton Hewitt	6; 3	5; 7	5; 10

==== Czech Republic vs. United States ====
Czech Republic
1
Perth Arena, Perth
7 January 2016, 17:30
Hard (i)

United States
2

			1	2	3
1	(Czech Republic) (United States)	Jiří Veselý; Jack Sock	6; 4	2; 6	6^{3} 7^{7}
2	(Czech Republic) (United States)	Karolína Plíšková; Victoria Duval	4; 6	6; 1	6; 4
3	(Czech Republic) (United States)	Jiří Veselý / Karolína Plíšková; Jack Sock / Victoria Duval	6^{5} 7^{7}	6; 4	7; 10

=== Group B ===
All times are local (UTC+8).

==== Standings ====
	Australia Green	France	Germany	Great Britain	RR W–L	Matches W–L	Sets W–L	Games W–L	Standings
Australia Green		2–1	3–0	2–1	3–0	7–2	15–8	119–101	1
France	1–2		1–2	1–2	0–3	3–6	9–13	95–110	4
Germany	0–3	2–1		0–3	1–2	2–7	6–15	90–115	3
Great Britain	1–2	2–1	3–0		2–1	6–3	14–8	123–111	2

==== Australia Green vs. Germany ====
Australia
3
Perth Arena, Perth
3 January 2016, 10:00
Hard (i)

Germany
0

			1	2	3
1	(Australia) (Germany)	Daria Gavrilova; Sabine Lisicki	6; 2	6; 2
2	(Australia) (Germany)	Nick Kyrgios; Alexander Zverev	4; 6	6; 1	6; 4
3	(Australia) (Germany)	Daria Gavrilova / Nick Kyrgios; Sabine Lisicki / Alexander Zverev	6; 3	4; 6	10; 7

==== Great Britain vs. France ====
Great Britain
2
Perth Arena, Perth
4 January 2016, 17:30
Hard (i)

France
1

			1	2	3
1	(United Kingdom) (France)	Andy Murray; Kenny de Schepper	6; 2	6; 2
2	(United Kingdom) (France)	Heather Watson; Caroline Garcia	3; 6	7; 5	3; 6
3	(United Kingdom) (France)	Heather Watson / Andy Murray; Caroline Garcia / Kenny de Schepper	6; 2	5; 7	10; 6

==== France vs. Germany ====
France
1
Perth Arena, Perth
6 January 2016, 10:00
Hard (i)

Germany
2

			1	2	3
1	(France) (Germany)	Caroline Garcia; Sabine Lisicki	6; 2	7^{7} 6^{5}
2	(France) (Germany)	Kenny de Schepper; Alexander Zverev	2; 6	2; 6
3	(France) (Germany)	Caroline Garcia / Kenny de Schepper; Sabine Lisicki / Alexander Zverev	4; 6	7^{8} 6^{6}	6; 10

==== Australia Green vs. Great Britain ====
Australia
2
Perth Arena, Perth
6 January 2016, 17:30
Hard (i)

Great Britain
1

			1	2	3
1	(Australia) (United Kingdom)	Nick Kyrgios; Andy Murray	6; 4	7^{7} 6^{5}
2	(Australia) (United Kingdom)	Daria Gavrilova; Heather Watson	7^{7} 6^{2}	2; 6	5; 7
3	(Australia) (United Kingdom)	Daria Gavrilova / Nick Kyrgios; Heather Watson / Andy Murray	6; 2	6^{0} 7^{7}	11; 9

==== Great Britain vs. Germany ====
Great Britain
3
Perth Arena, Perth
8 January 2016, 10:00
Hard (i)

Germany
0

			1	2	3
1	(United Kingdom) (Germany)	Heather Watson; Sabine Lisicki	6; 3	6; 4
2	(United Kingdom) (Germany)	Andy Murray; Alexander Zverev	6; 3	6; 4
3	(United Kingdom) (Germany)	Andy Murray / Heather Watson; Alexander Zverev / Sabine Lisicki	6; 3	6; 4

==== Australia Green vs. France ====
Australia
2
Perth Arena, Perth
8 January 2016, 17:30
Hard (i)

France
1

			1	2	3
1	(Australia) (France)	Nick Kyrgios; Kenny de Schepper	6; 4	6; 4
2	(Australia) (France)	Daria Gavrilova; Caroline Garcia	4; 6	6^{7} 7^{9}
3	(Australia) (France)	Daria Gavrilova / Nick Kyrgios; Kenny de Schepper / Caroline Garcia	6; 4	2; 6	11; 9

== Final ==
=== Ukraine vs. Australia Green ===
Ukraine
0
Perth Arena, Perth
9 January 2016, 15:30
Hard (i)

Australia
2

			1	2	3
1	(Ukraine) (Australia)	Elina Svitolina; Daria Gavrilova	4; 6	6^{6} 7^{8}
2	(Ukraine) (Australia)	Alexandr Dolgopolov; Nick Kyrgios	3; 6	4; 6
3	(Ukraine) (Australia)	Elina Svitolina / Alexandr Dolgopolov; Daria Gavrilova / Nick Kyrgios				not played

The mixed doubles event was not played in the final, as Australia Green had won both singles matches.

2016 Hopman Cup Champions
(Australia)
Australia
Second title

== Broadcast ==
Selected matches aired in Australia on either 7mate or 7Two, with live coverage of both day and night sessions. Every match was also available to be streamed live through a free 7Tennis mobile app.
