= Israel at the Hopman Cup =

Sporting event delegation

Israel
- First year: 1993
- Years played: 1
- Best finish: Round One (1993)
- Most total wins: Anna Smashnova (0–2); Amos Mansdorf (0–2)
- Most singles wins: Anna Smashnova (0–1); Amos Mansdorf (0–1)
- Most doubles wins: Anna Smashnova (0–1); Amos Mansdorf (0–1)
- Best doubles team: Anna Smashnova & Amos Mansdorf (0–1)
- Most years played: Anna Smashnova (1); Amos Mansdorf (1)

Israel is a nation that has competed at the Hopman Cup tournament on one occasion, at the 5th annual staging of the tournament in 1993, when they lost to France in the first round.

== Players ==
This is a list of players who have played for Israel in the Hopman Cup.

Name	Total W–L	Singles W–L	Doubles W–L	First year played	No. of years played
Amos Mansdorf	0–2	0–1	0–1	1993	1
Anna Smashnova	0–2	0–1	0–1	1993	1

== Results ==
Year	Competition	Location	Opponent	Score	Result
1993	Round One	Burswood Dome, Perth	France	0–3	Lost
