= 1992 Hopman Cup =

- Date: 27 December 1991 – 3 January 1992
- Edition: IV
- Surface: Hard indoor
- Location: Perth, Western Australia
- Venue: Burswood Entertainment Complex

Champions
- Switzerland
← 1991 ·	Hopman Cup	· 1993 →

The 1992 Hopman Cup was the fourth edition to the Hopman Cup tennis event. Jakob Hlasek and Manuela Maleeva-Fragnière (who mostly, but not in this case, played for Bulgaria) of Switzerland beat Helena Suková and Karel Nováček of Czechoslovakia in the final at the Burswood Entertainment Complex in Perth, Western Australia. The tournament took place between 27 December 1991 through 3 January 1992.

== Teams ==
=== Seeds ===
1. Germany – Steffi Graf and Boris Becker (semifinalists)
2. Spain – Arantxa Sánchez Vicario and Emilio Sánchez (semifinalists)
3. United States – Amy Frazier and Derrick Rostagno (quarterfinalists)
4. Switzerland – Manuela Maleeva-Fragnière and Jakob Hlasek (champions)
5. Czechoslovakia – Helena Suková and Karel Nováček (finalists)
6. CIS – Natasha Zvereva and Andrei Cherkasov (quarterfinalists)
7. France – Julie Halard and Henri Leconte (quarterfinalists)
8. Netherlands – Brenda Schultz and Richard Krajicek (quarterfinalists)

=== Unseeded ===
- Australia – Rachel McQuillan and Todd Woodbridge (first round)
- (United Kingdom) Great Britain – Jo Durie and Jeremy Bates (first round)
- Japan – Kimiko Date and Yasufumi Yamamoto (first round)
- Sweden – Catarina Lindqvist and Peter Lundgren – First Round)

== Draw ==
First Round
Sweden	1
7	France	2
Japan	1
5	Czechoslovakia	2
6	CIS	2
(United Kingdom) Great Britain	1
8	Netherlands	3
Australia	0

Quarterfinals
1	Germany	2
7	France	1
3	United States	1
5	Czechoslovakia	2
6	CIS	1
4	Switzerland	2
8	Netherlands	1
2	Spain	2

Semifinals
1	Germany	1
5	Czechoslovakia	2
4	Switzerland	3
2	Spain	0

Finals
5	Czechoslovakia	1
4	Switzerland	2

== First round ==
=== CIS vs. Great Britain ===
CIS
2
Burswood Entertainment Complex, Perth
27 December 1991 – 3 January 1992
Hard (indoor)

Great Britain
1

			1	2	3
1	(Commonwealth of Independent States) (United Kingdom)	Natalia Zvereva; Jo Durie	4; 6	6; 0	6; 4
2	(Commonwealth of Independent States) (United Kingdom)	Andrei Cherkasov; Jeremy Bates	6; 3	4; 6	6; 1
3	(Commonwealth of Independent States) (United Kingdom)	Natalia Zvereva / Andrei Cherkasov; Jo Durie / Jeremy Bates	6; 8

=== Netherlands vs. Australia ===
Netherlands
3
Burswood Entertainment Complex, Perth
27 December 1991 – 3 January 1992
Hard (indoor)

Australia
0

			1	2	3
1	(Netherlands) (Australia)	Brenda Schultz; Rachel McQuillan	6; 7	6; 3	6; 2
2	(Netherlands) (Australia)	Richard Krajicek; Todd Woodbridge	6; 0	6; 3
3	(Netherlands) (Australia)	Brenda Schultz / Richard Krajicek; Rachel McQuillan / Todd Woodbridge	8; 4

=== France vs. Sweden ===
France
2
Burswood Entertainment Complex, Perth
27 December 1991 – 3 January 1992
Hard (indoor)

Sweden
1

			1	2	3
1	(France) (Sweden)	Julie Halard; Catarina Lindqvist	6; 4	7; 5
2	(France) (Sweden)	Henri Leconte; Peter Lundgren	6; 4	2; 6	6; 3
3	(France) (Sweden)	Julie Halard / Henri Leconte; Catarina Lindqvist / Peter Lundgren	6; 8

=== Czechoslovakia vs. Japan ===
Czechoslovakia
2
Burswood Entertainment Complex, Perth
27 December 1991 – 3 January 1992
Hard (indoor)

Japan
1

			1	2	3
1	(Czechoslovakia) (Japan)	Helena Suková; Kimiko Date	3; 6	6; 2	5; 7
2	(Czechoslovakia) (Japan)	Karel Nováček; Yasufumi Yamamoto	6; 4	6; 7	6; 3
3	(Czechoslovakia) (Japan)	Helena Suková / Karel Nováček; Kimiko Date / Yasufumi Yamamoto	6; 2	6; 4

== Quarterfinals ==
=== Switzerland vs. CIS ===
Switzerland
2
Burswood Entertainment Complex, Perth
27 December 1991 – 3 January 1992
Hard (indoor)

CIS
1

			1	2	3
1	(Switzerland) (Commonwealth of Independent States)	Manuela Maleeva-Fragnière; Natalia Zvereva	5; 7	6; 0	6; 2
2	(Switzerland) (Commonwealth of Independent States)	Jakob Hlasek; Andrei Cherkasov	3; 6	6; 7
3	(Switzerland) (Commonwealth of Independent States)	Manuela Maleeva-Fragnière / Jakob Hlasek; Natalia Zvereva / Andrei Cherkasov	6; 2	6; 1

=== Spain vs. Netherlands ===
Spain
2
Burswood Entertainment Complex, Perth
27 December 1991 – 3 January 1992
Hard (indoor)

Netherlands
1

			1	2	3
1	(Spain) (Netherlands)	Arantxa Sánchez Vicario; Brenda Schultz	6; 2	6; 4
2	(Spain) (Netherlands)	Emilio Sánchez; Richard Krajicek	3; 6	4; 6
3	(Spain) (Netherlands)	Arantxa Sánchez Vicario / Emilio Sánchez; Brenda Schultz / Richard Krajicek	6; 7	7; 6	7; 6

=== Germany vs. France ===
Germany
2
Burswood Entertainment Complex, Perth
27 December 1991 – 3 January 1992
Hard (indoor)

France
1

			1	2	3
1	(Germany) (France)	Steffi Graf; Julie Halard	6; 0	7; 5
2	(Germany) (France)	Boris Becker; Henri Leconte	6; 2	6; 4
3	(Germany) (France)	Steffi Graf / Boris Becker; Julie Halard / Henri Leconte				w/o

=== Czechoslovakia vs. United States ===
Czechoslovakia
2
Burswood Entertainment Complex, Perth
27 December 1991 – 3 January 1992
Hard (indoor)

United States
1

			1	2	3
1	(Czechoslovakia) (United States)	Helena Suková; Amy Frazier	7; 6	6; 7	6; 2
2	(Czechoslovakia) (United States)	Karel Nováček; Derrick Rostagno	0; 6	3; 6
3	(Czechoslovakia) (United States)	Helena Suková / Karel Nováček; Amy Frazier / Derrick Rostagno	6; 1	6; 2

== Semifinals ==
=== Switzerland vs. Spain ===
Switzerland
3
Burswood Entertainment Complex, Perth
27 December 1991 – 3 January 1992
Hard (indoor)

Spain
0

			1	2	3
1	(Switzerland) (Spain)	Manuela Maleeva-Fragnière; Arantxa Sánchez Vicario	6; 3	3; 6	6; 4
2	(Switzerland) (Spain)	Jakob Hlasek; Emilio Sánchez	6; 4	6; 2
3	(Switzerland) (Spain)	Manuela Maleeva-Fragnière / Jakob Hlasek; Arantxa Sánchez Vicario / Emilio Sánchez	8; 5

=== Czechoslovakia vs. Germany ===
Czechoslovakia
2
Burswood Entertainment Complex, Perth
27 December 1991 – 3 January 1992
Hard (indoor)

Germany
1

			1	2	3
1	(Czechoslovakia) (Germany)	Helena Suková; Steffi Graf	2; 6	6; 1		retired
2	(Czechoslovakia) (Germany)	Karel Nováček; Boris Becker	2; 6	6; 7
3	(Czechoslovakia) (Germany)	Helena Suková / Karel Nováček; Steffi Graf / Boris Becker	6; 4	6; 4

== Final ==
=== Switzerland vs. Czechoslovakia ===
Switzerland
2
Burswood Entertainment Complex, Perth
27 December 1991 – 3 January 1992
Hard (indoor)

Czechoslovakia
1

			1	2	3
1	(Switzerland) (Czechoslovakia)	Manuela Maleeva-Fragnière; Helena Suková	6; 2	6; 4
2	(Switzerland) (Czechoslovakia)	Jakob Hlasek; Karel Nováček	6; 4	6; 4
3	(Switzerland) (Czechoslovakia)	Manuela Maleeva-Fragnière / Jakob Hlasek; Helena Suková / Karel Nováček	4; 8

1992 Hopman Cup Champions
(Switzerland)
Switzerland
First title
