= Uzbekistan at the Hopman Cup =

Sporting event delegation

Uzbekistan
- First year: 2003
- Years played: 1
- Best finish: 4th in group
- Most total wins: Iroda Tulyaganova (2–6); Oleg Ogorodov (2–6)
- Most singles wins: Iroda Tulyaganova (1–3); Oleg Ogorodov (1–3)
- Most doubles wins: Iroda Tulyaganova (1–3); Oleg Ogorodov (1–3)
- Best doubles team: Iroda Tulyaganova & Oleg Ogorodov (1–3)
- Most years played: Iroda Tulyaganova (1); Oleg Ogorodov (1)

Uzbekistan is a nation that has competed at the Hopman Cup tournament on one occasion, in 2003. In 2003, Uzbekistan won their qualification play-off but went on to place fourth in group A.

Before its dissolution, Uzbekistan used to form part of the Soviet Union which also competed at the Hopman Cup on two occasions in the early 1990s. Additionally, Uzbekistan is a member of the CIS which entered a team into the 1992 event.

Uzbekistan also participated on one occasion in the now defunct Asian Hopman Cup, a qualifying tournament which ran from 2006 until 2009 and granted the winners entry into the Hopman Cup the following year. The nation competed in 2007 and failed to pass the round robin stage of the tournament, thus denying them entry into the main event in Australia the following year.

== Players ==
This is a list of players who have played for Uzbekistan in the Hopman Cup.

Name	Total W–L	Singles W–L	Doubles W–L	First year played	No. of years played
Oleg Ogorodov	2–6	1–3	1–3	2003	1
Iroda Tulyaganova	2–6	1–3	1–3	2003	1

== Results ==
Year	Competition	Location	Opponent	Score	Result
2003	Qualification Play-offs	Burswood Dome, Perth	Paraguay	2–1	Won
2003	Round Robin	Burswood Dome, Perth	United States	0–3	Lost
2003	Round Robin	Burswood Dome, Perth	Belgium	0–3	Lost
2003	Round Robin	Burswood Dome, Perth	Spain	1–2	Lost

== See also ==
- CIS at the Hopman Cup
- Soviet Union at the Hopman Cup
