= Czech Republic at the Hopman Cup =

Sporting event delegation

Czech Republic
- First year: 1993
- Years played: 12
- Hopman Cup titles: 2 (1994, 2012)
- Most total wins: Tomáš Berdych (9–9); Petr Korda (9–5)
- Most singles wins: Tomáš Berdych (8–2)
- Most doubles wins: Jana Novotná (3–4); Petr Korda (3–4)
- Best doubles team: Jana Novotná & Petr Korda (3–4)
- Most years played: Tomáš Berdych (3); Petr Korda (3); Jana Novotná (3); Lucie Šafářová (3)

The Czech Republic is a nation that has competed at the Hopman Cup tournament on ten occasions, first competing at the 5th Hopman Cup in 1993. They have won the title on two occasions: in 1994 and in 2012.

Before its dissolution, the Czech Republic used to form part of Czechoslovakia which competed at the first four Hopman Cups, from 1989 until 1992.

== Players ==
This is a list of players who have played for the Czech Republic in the Hopman Cup.

Name	Total W–L	Singles W–L	Doubles W–L	First year played	No. of years played
Dája Bedáňová	2–4	1–2	1–2	2003	1
Tomáš Berdych	9–9	8–2	1–7	2007	3
Lucie Hradecká	3–3	2–1	1–2	2017	1
Petr Korda	9–5	6–1	3–4	1993	3
Petra Kvitová	8–2	6–0	2–2	2012	2
Jiří Novák	6–6	4–2	2–4	2003	2
Jana Novotná	6–8	3–4	3–4	1993	3
Adam Pavlásek	4–8	1–5	3–3	2015	2
Karolína Plíšková	4–2	2–1	2–1	2016	1
Lucie Šafářová	7–11	5–4	2–7	2007	3
Radek Štěpánek	2–2	1–1	1–1	2014	1
Barbora Strýcová	1–5	0–3	1–2	2004	1
Jiří Veselý	3–3	1–2	2–1	2016	1

== Results ==
Year	Competition	Location	Opponent	Score	Result
1993	Quarterfinal	Burswood Dome, Perth	Germany	2–1	Won
1993	Semifinal	Burswood Dome, Perth	United States	1–2	Lost
1994	Quarterfinals	Burswood Dome, Perth	Switzerland	2–1	Won
1994	Semifinals	Burswood Dome, Perth	Australia	2–1	Won
1994	Final	Burswood Dome, Perth	Germany	2–1	Won
1995	Quarterfinals	Burswood Dome, Perth	Australia	2–1	Won
1995	Semifinals	Burswood Dome, Perth	Ukraine	1–2	Lost
2003	Round Robin	Burswood Dome, Perth	Slovakia	2–1	Won
2003	Round Robin	Burswood Dome, Perth	Italy	2–1	Won
2003	Round Robin	Burswood Dome, Perth	Australia	1–2	Lost
2004	Round Robin	Burswood Dome, Perth	United States	0–3	Lost
2004	Round Robin	Burswood Dome, Perth	Russia	1–2	Lost
2004	Round Robin	Burswood Dome, Perth	France	1–2	Lost
2007	Round Robin	Burswood Dome, Perth	India	1–2	Lost
2007	Round Robin	Burswood Dome, Perth	Spain	2–1	Won
2007	Round Robin	Burswood Dome, Perth	Croatia	1–2	Lost
2008	Round Robin	Burswood Dome, Perth	Australia	1–2	Lost
2008	Round Robin	Burswood Dome, Perth	United States	0–3	Lost
2008	Round Robin	Burswood Dome, Perth	India	2–1	Won
2012 ^{1}	Round Robin	Burswood Dome, Perth	Bulgaria	2–1	Won
2012 ^{1}	Round Robin	Burswood Dome, Perth	United States	3–0	Won
2012 ^{1}	Round Robin	Burswood Dome, Perth	Denmark	2–0	Won
2012 ^{1}	Final	Burswood Dome, Perth	France	2–0	Won
2014	Round Robin	Perth Arena, Perth	Spain	3–0	Won
2014	Round Robin	Perth Arena, Perth	France	1–2	Lost
2014	Round Robin	Perth Arena, Perth	United States	3–0	Won
2015	Round Robin	Perth Arena, Perth	Canada	2–1	Won
2015	Round Robin	Perth Arena, Perth	Italy	3–0	Won
2015	Round Robin	Perth Arena, Perth	United States	0–3	Lost
2016	Round Robin	Perth Arena, Perth	Australia	3–0	Won
2016	Round Robin	Perth Arena, Perth	Ukraine	1–2	Lost
2016	Round Robin	Perth Arena, Perth	United States	1–2	Lost
2017	Round Robin	Perth Arena, Perth	United States	0–3	Lost
2017	Round Robin	Perth Arena, Perth	Australia	2–1	Won
2017	Round Robin	Perth Arena, Perth	Spain	1–2	Lost

^{1} In 2012, in the round robin tie against Denmark and in the final against France, the dead mixed doubles rubbers were not played.

== See also ==
Czechoslovakia at the Hopman Cup
