= 1993 Hopman Cup =

- Date: 2–8 January 1993
- Edition: V
- Surface: Hard (indoor)
- Location: Perth, Western Australia
- Venue: Burswood Entertainment Complex

Champions
- Germany
← 1992 ·	Hopman Cup	· 1994 →

The 1993 Hopman Cup was the fifth edition of the Hopman Cup that was held at the Burswood Entertainment Complex, in Perth, Western Australia. Steffi Graf and Michael Stich of Germany defeated Arantxa Sánchez Vicario and Emilio Sánchez of Spain in the final to win the title. The tournament took place between 2 January through 8 January 1993.

== Teams ==
=== Seeds ===
1. Germany – Steffi Graf and Michael Stich (champions)
2. Czech Republic – Jana Novotná and Petr Korda (semifinals)
3. Spain - Arantxa Sánchez Vicario and Emilio Sánchez (final)
4. United States – Mary Joe Fernández and MaliVai Washington (quarterfinals)
5. France - Nathalie Tauziat and Guy Forget (semifinals)
6. South Africa - Amanda Coetzer and Wayne Ferreira (first round)
7. Austria - Judith Wiesner and Thomas Muster (first round)
8. Switzerland - Manuela Maleeva-Fragniere and Claudio Mezzadri (quarterfinals)

=== Unseeded ===
- Australia – Nicole Provis and Wally Masur (quarterfinals)
- Japan – Kimiko Date and Yasufumi Yamamoto (first round)
- Israel – Anna Smashnova and Amos Mansdorf (first round)
- Ukraine – Natalia Medvedeva and Andrei Medvedev (quarterfinals)

== Draw ==
First Round
7	Austria	1
Ukraine	2
5	France	3
Israel	0
Japan	1
8	Switzerland	2
Australia	3
6	South Africa	0

Quarterfinals
1	Germany	2
Ukraine	1
4	United States	1
5	France	2
8	Switzerland	0
3	Spain	3
Australia	1
2	Czech Republic	2

Semifinals
1	Germany	2
5	France	1
3	Spain	2
2	Czech Republic	1

Finals
1	Germany	2
3	Spain	1

== First round ==
=== Austria vs. Ukraine ===
Austria
1
Burswood Entertainment Complex, Perth, Western Australia
1993
Indoor Hard

Ukraine
2

			1	2	3
1	(Austria) (Ukraine)	Judith Wiesner; Natalia Medvedeva	6; 1	6; 4
2	(Austria) (Ukraine)	Thomas Muster; Andrei Medvedev	4; 6	6; 7
3	(Austria) (Ukraine)	Thomas Muster / Judith Wiesner; Andrei Medvedev / Natalia Medvedeva	5; 7	6; 3	2; 6

=== France vs. Israel ===
France
3
Burswood Entertainment Complex, Perth, Western Australia
1993
Indoor Hard

Israel
0

			1	2	3
1	(France) (Israel)	Nathalie Tauziat; Anna Smashnova	6; 1	6; 0
2	(France) (Israel)	Guy Forget; Amos Mansdorf	6; 2	6; 7	7; 6
3	(France) (Israel)	Guy Forget / Nathalie Tauziat; Amos Mansdorf / Anna Smashnova	8; 1

=== Japan vs. Switzerland ===
Japan
1
Burswood Entertainment Complex, Perth, Western Australia
1993
Indoor Hard

Switzerland
2

			1	2	3
1	(Japan) (Switzerland)	Kimiko Date; Manuela Maleeva-Fragniere	6; 3	6; 2
2	(Japan) (Switzerland)	Yasufumi Yamamoto; Claudio Mezzadri	6; 3	5; 7	3; 6
3	(Japan) (Switzerland)	Yasufumi Yamamoto / Kimiko Date; Claudio Mezzadri / Manuela Maleeva-Fragniere	2; 6	7; 5	2; 6

=== Australia vs. South Africa ===
Australia
3
Burswood Entertainment Complex, Perth, Western Australia
1993
Indoor Hard

South Africa
0

			1	2	3
1	(Australia) (South Africa)	Nicole Provis; Amanda Coetzer	6; 7	7; 5	7; 6
2	(Australia) (South Africa)	Wally Masur; Wayne Ferreira	7; 5	6; 3
3	(Australia) (South Africa)	Wally Masur / Nicole Provis; Wayne Ferreira / Amanda Coetzer	8; 6

== Quarterfinals ==
=== Germany vs. Ukraine ===
Germany
2
Burswood Entertainment Complex, Perth, Western Australia
1993
Indoor Hard

Ukraine
1

			1	2	3
1	(Germany) (Ukraine)	Steffi Graf; Natalia Medvedeva	6; 2	6; 1
2	(Germany) (Ukraine)	Michael Stich; Andrei Medvedev	5; 7	5; 7
3	(Germany) (Ukraine)	Michael Stich / Steffi Graf; Andrei Medvedev / Natalia Medvedeva	7; 5	6; 3

=== USA vs. France ===
United States
1
Burswood Entertainment Complex, Perth, Western Australia
1993
Indoor Hard

France
2

			1	2	3
1	(United States) (France)	Mary Joe Fernández; Nathalie Tauziat	6; 1	6; 7	6; 4
2	(United States) (France)	MaliVai Washington; Guy Forget	3; 6	4; 6
3	(United States) (France)	MaliVai Washington / Mary Joe Fernández; Guy Forget / Nathalie Tauziat	3; 6	2; 6

=== Switzerland vs. Spain ===
Switzerland
0
Burswood Entertainment Complex, Perth, Western Australia
1993
Indoor Hard

Spain
3

			1	2	3
1	(Switzerland) (Spain)	Manuela Maleeva-Fragniere; Arantxa Sánchez Vicario	6; 1	0; 6	3; 6
2	(Switzerland) (Spain)	Claudio Mezzadri; Emilio Sánchez	6; 4	3; 6	6; 7
3	(Switzerland) (Spain)	Claudio Mezzadri / Manuela Maleeva-Fragniere; Emilio Sánchez / Arantxa Sánchez Vicario	6; 8

=== Australia vs. Czech Republic ===
Australia
1
Burswood Entertainment Complex, Perth, Western Australia
1993
Indoor Hard

Czech Republic
2

			1	2	3
1	(Australia) (Czech Republic)	Nicole Provis; Jana Novotná	6; 1	6; 4
2	(Australia) (Czech Republic)	Wally Masur; Petr Korda	6; 7	4; 6
3	(Australia) (Czech Republic)	Wally Masur / Nicole Provis; Petr Korda / Jana Novotná	2; 6	6; 7

== Semifinals ==
=== Germany vs. France ===
Germany
2
Burswood Entertainment Complex, Perth, Western Australia
1993
Indoor Hard

France
1

			1	2	3
1	(Germany) (France)	Steffi Graf; Nathalie Tauziat	6; 3	6; 4
2	(Germany) (France)	Michael Stich; Guy Forget	6; 2	6; 7	7; 6
3	(Germany) (France)	Michael Stich / Steffi Graf; Guy Forget / Nathalie Tauziat	4; 8

=== Spain vs. Czech Republic ===
Spain
2
Burswood Entertainment Complex, Perth, Western Australia
1993
Indoor Hard

Czech Republic
1

			1	2	3
1	(Spain) (Czech Republic)	Arantxa Sánchez Vicario; Jana Novotná	6; 3	6; 3
2	(Spain) (Czech Republic)	Emilio Sánchez; Petr Korda	3; 6	4; 6
3	(Spain) (Czech Republic)	Emilio Sánchez / Arantxa Sánchez Vicario; Petr Korda / Jana Novotná	3; 6	6; 3	7; 5

== Final ==
=== Germany vs. Spain ===
Germany
2
Burswood Entertainment Complex, Perth, Western Australia
1993
Indoor Hard

Spain
1

			1	2	3
1	(Germany) (Spain)	Steffi Graf; Arantxa Sánchez Vicario	6; 4	6; 3
2	(Germany) (Spain)	Michael Stich; Emilio Sánchez	7; 5	6; 3
3	(Germany) (Spain)	Michael Stich / Steffi Graf; Emilio Sánchez / Arantxa Sánchez Vicario				w/o

1993 Hopman Cup Champions
(Germany)
Germany
First title
