= Hopman Cup =

International tennis tournament

- Hopman Cup logo for 2023
- Sport: Tennis
- Founded: 1989
- No. of teams: 8 (1989, 1996–2019); 12 (1990–1995); 6 (2023, 2025)
- Competitors: ITF member nations
- Country: Australia (1989–2019); France (2023); Italy (2025)
- Venues: Burswood Dome (1989–2012); Perth Arena (2013–2019); Nice Lawn Tennis Club (2023); Fiera del Levante (2025)
- Most recent champion: Canada (1st title) (2025)
- Most titles: United States (6 titles)
- Website: hopmancup.com

The Hopman Cup is an international tennis tournament that plays mixed teams (one male and one female) on a country-by-country basis. It was first held in Perth, Western Australia each year from 1989 to 2019, played on indoor hardcourt, before being replaced on the calendar in 2020 by the now defunct ATP Cup, which was in turn replaced by the United Cup. The tournament was played in an eight-team format, with the exception for the years 1990-1995, with twelve teams competing. It returned in July 2023 in Nice, France and was played on outdoor clay, with six teams invited to participate. This continued in 2025, with the tournament being held in Bari, Italy on hard courts.

== History ==
The Hopman Cup was created in 1989. The championship is named in honour of Harry Hopman (1906–1985), an Australian tennis player and coach who guided the country to 15 Davis Cup titles between 1938 and 1969. From the time the Hopman Cup was founded in 1989, it was attended each year by Hopman's widow, his second wife Lucy, who travelled to the tournament from her home in the United States until she died in 2018.

The 2005/06 Hopman Cup was the first elite-level tennis tournament in which the system was introduced allowing players to challenge point-ending line calls similar to that in clay court tournaments. The challenged calls are immediately reviewed on a large monitor using Hawk-Eye technology. Up to and including 2012, the venue was the Burswood Dome at the Burswood Entertainment Complex. The 20th Hopman Cup, in 2008, was intended to be the last held at the Burswood Dome, however this was extended until 2012 when the new Perth Arena was due for completion. From 2013 to 2019, it was played at the Perth Arena.

From 2014 to 2019, the Hopman Cup tournament director was Paul Kilderry after the resignation of Steve Ayles. Previously, the former Australian tennis player Paul McNamee, who played a key role in the founding of the championships, was the tournament director.

In 2019 for the 31st edition of the tournament, a record crowd of 14,064 witnessed the 2019 Hopman Cup match between United States and Switzerland. Roger Federer and Belinda Bencic won, with Federer becoming the first player to win the tournament three times. He and Belinda Bencic became the first pairing to successfully defend the title, having won it the previous year.

The Hopman Cup was not held in 2020 (it was replaced in the tennis calendar until 2022 by the now defunct ATP Cup). ITF president David Haggerty later announced the tournament would return in 2021. After the tournament was unable to be held in 2021, he announced it would return in 2022 instead. In December 2021, it was announced that the tournament would return in Nice in 2023. The 2023 and 2024 editions would contract to six teams before expanding back to the original eight-team format in 2025. However, there was no competition in 2024, and the 2025 edition still featured only six teams.

In March 2024, it was decided that the Hopman Cup would not be held that year due to the 2024 Summer Olympics and would return in 2025, this time at Bari, Puglia, Italy, from July 16 to 20.

== Format ==
Unlike other major international team tennis tournaments such as the Davis Cup and the Fed Cup, which are for men or women only, the Hopman Cup is a mixed competition in which male and female players are on combined teams and represent their countries. Players are invited to attend and national coaches are not involved in selecting teams.

The tournament is a sanctioned official event in the calendar of the International Tennis Federation (ITF) but, while individual player results are tallied, they are not regarded as official ATP matches or included in the calculation of ATP or WTA rankings.

Originally, eight nations were selected annually to compete in the Hopman Cup. The "last" team may be decided by play-offs between several nations before competition begins. For the 2007 Hopman Cup however, this did not occur, due to the Asian Qualifying Tournament creating the eighth team. Since 2023, only six teams are competing.

Each team consists of one male player and one female player. Each match-up between two teams at the event consists of:

- one women's singles match
- one men's singles match
- one mixed doubles match

The competing teams are separated into two groups (with two teams being seeded) and face-off against each of the other teams in their group in a round-robin format. The seedings ensure that each group has approximately similar strength. The top team in each group then meet in a final to decide the champions.

If a player is injured then a player of a lower ranking of that nation may be the substitute.

The winning team receives a silver cup perpetual trophy and through 2013 the winning team members were presented with distinctive individual trophies in the shape of a tennis ball.

== Telecasts ==
The Hopman Cup was originally broadcast by the Seven Network until 1994, then by the Australian Broadcasting Corporation (1995–2010). From 2011, a five-year deal to broadcast the competition was signed by Network Ten, a deal that ended abruptly in November 2013. The Seven Network's 7mate channel subsequently picked up the telecasting rights. The Nine Network broadcast the tournament in 2019. In 2025, the official broadcaster was SuperTennis TV.

== Records and statistics ==
=== Finals by year ===
Year	Winners	Score	Runners-up	Female champion	Male champion	Female finalist	Male finalist
1989	Czechoslovakia	2–0	Australia	Helena Suková	Miloslav Mečíř	Hana Mandlíková	Pat Cash
1990	Spain	2–1	United States	Arantxa Sánchez Vicario	Emilio Sánchez	Pam Shriver	John McEnroe
1991	Yugoslavia	3–0	United States	Monica Seles	Goran Prpić	Zina Garrison	David Wheaton
1992	Switzerland	2–1	Czechoslovakia	Manuela Maleeva	Jakob Hlasek	Helena Suková	Karel Nováček
1993	Germany	2–0	Spain	Steffi Graf	Michael Stich	Arantxa Sánchez	Emilio Sánchez
1994	Czech Republic	2–1	Germany	Jana Novotná	Petr Korda	Anke Huber	Bernd Karbacher
1995	Germany (2)	2–0	Ukraine	Anke Huber	Boris Becker	Natalia Medvedeva	Andrei Medvedev
1996	Croatia	2–1	Switzerland	Iva Majoli	Goran Ivanišević	Martina Hingis	Marc Rosset
1997	United States	2–1	South Africa	Chanda Rubin	Justin Gimelstob	Amanda Coetzer	Wayne Ferreira
1998	Slovakia	2–1	France	Karina Habšudová	Karol Kučera	Mary Pierce	Cédric Pioline
1999	Australia	2–1	Sweden	Jelena Dokić	Mark Philippoussis	Åsa Carlsson	Jonas Björkman
2000	South Africa	3–0	Thailand	Amanda Coetzer	Wayne Ferreira	Tamarine Tanasugarn	Paradorn Srichaphan
2001	Switzerland (2)	2–1	United States	Martina Hingis	Roger Federer	Monica Seles	Jan-Michael Gambill
2002	Spain (2)	2–1	United States	Arantxa Sánchez Vicario (2)	Tommy Robredo	Monica Seles	Jan-Michael Gambill
2003	United States (2)	3–0	Australia	Serena Williams	James Blake	Alicia Molik	Lleyton Hewitt
2004	United States (3)	2–1	Slovakia	Lindsay Davenport	James Blake (2)	Daniela Hantuchová	Karol Kučera
2005	Slovakia (2)	3–0	Argentina	Daniela Hantuchová	Dominik Hrbatý	Gisela Dulko	Guillermo Coria
2006	United States (4)	2–1	Netherlands	Lisa Raymond	Taylor Dent	Michaëlla Krajicek	Peter Wessels
2007	Russia	2–0	Spain	Nadia Petrova	Dmitry Tursunov	Anabel Medina Garrigues	Tommy Robredo
2008	United States (5)	2–1	Serbia	Serena Williams (2)	Mardy Fish	Jelena Janković	Novak Djokovic
2009	Slovakia (3)	2–0	Russia	Dominika Cibulková	Dominik Hrbatý (2)	Dinara Safina	Marat Safin
2010	Spain (3)	2–1	Great Britain	María JM Sánchez	Tommy Robredo (2)	Laura Robson	Andy Murray
2011	United States (6)	2–1	Belgium	Bethanie Mattek-Sands	John Isner	Justine Henin	Ruben Bemelmans
2012	Czech Republic (2)	2–0	France	Petra Kvitová	Tomáš Berdych	Marion Bartoli	Richard Gasquet
2013	Spain (4)	2–1	Serbia	Anabel Medina Garrigues	Fernando Verdasco	Ana Ivanovic	Novak Djokovic
2014	France	2–1	Poland	Alizé Cornet	Jo-Wilfried Tsonga	Agnieszka Radwańska	Grzegorz Panfil
2015	Poland	2–1	United States	Agnieszka Radwańska	Jerzy Janowicz	Serena Williams	John Isner
2016	Australia (2)	2–0	Ukraine	Daria Gavrilova	Nick Kyrgios	Elina Svitolina	Alexandr Dolgopolov
2017	France (2)	2–1	United States	Kristina Mladenovic	Richard Gasquet	CoCo Vandeweghe	Jack Sock
2018	Switzerland (3)	2–1	Germany	Belinda Bencic	Roger Federer (2)	Angelique Kerber	Alexander Zverev
2019	Switzerland (4)	2–1	Germany	Belinda Bencic (2)	Roger Federer (3)	Angelique Kerber	Alexander Zverev
2020–22	No competition						
2023	Croatia (2)	2–0	Switzerland	Donna Vekić	Borna Ćorić	Céline Naef	Leandro Riedi
2024	No competition						
2025	Canada	2–1	Italy	Bianca Andreescu	Félix Auger-Aliassime	Lucia Bronzetti	Flavio Cobolli

=== Performance by team ===
Country	Years won	Runners-up
United States	1997, 2003, 2004, 2006, 2008, 2011 (6)	1990, 1991, 2001, 2002, 2015, 2017 (6)
Spain	1990, 2002, 2010, 2013 (4)	1993, 2007 (2)
Switzerland	1992, 2001, 2018, 2019 (4)	1996, 2023 (2)
Slovakia	1998, 2005, 2009 (3)	2004 (1)
Czech Republic; Czechoslovakia	1989, 1994, 2012 (3)	1992 (1)
Germany	1993, 1995 (2)	1994, 2018, 2019 (3)
Australia	1999, 2016 (2)	1989, 2003 (2)
France	2014, 2017 (2)	1998, 2012 (2)
Croatia	1996, 2023 (2)	–
South Africa	2000 (1)	1997 (1)
Russia	2007 (1)	2009 (1)
Poland	2015 (1)	2014 (1)
Yugoslavia	1991 (1)	–
Canada	2025 (1)	–
Serbia	–	2008, 2013 (2)
Ukraine	–	1995, 2016 (2)
Sweden	–	1999 (1)
Thailand	–	2000 (1)
Argentina	–	2005 (1)
Netherlands	–	2006 (1)
Great Britain	–	2010 (1)
Belgium	–	2011 (1)
Italy	–	2025 (1)

- Consecutive titles
  - All-time: 2, United States, 2003–2004; Switzerland, 2018−2019
- Consecutive finals appearances
  - All-time: 4, United States, 2001–2004

=== Participation details ===
Nation	1989	1990	1991	1992	1993	1994	1995	1996	1997	1998	1999	2000	2001	2002	2003	2004	2005	2006	2007	2008	2009	2010	2011	2012	2013	2014	2015	2016	2017	2018	2019	2023	2025	Total
Argentina	–	–	–	–	–	–	1R	–	–	–	–	–	–	RR	–	–	F	RR	–	RR	–	–	–	–	–	–	–	–	–	–	–	−	−	5
Australia	F	SF	QF	1R	QF	SF	QF	RR	RR	RR	W	RR	RR	RR	F	RR	RR	RR	RR	RR	RR	RR	RR	RR	RR	RR	RR	RR	RR	RR	RR	–	–	31
Australia	F	SF	QF	1R	QF	SF	QF	RR	RR	RR	W	RR	RR	RR	F	RR	RR	RR	RR	RR	RR	RR	RR	RR	RR	RR	RR	W	RR	RR	RR	–	–	31
Austria	–	QF	–	–	1R	SF	QF	–	–	–	–	RR	–	–	–	–	–	–	–	–	–	–	–	–	–	–	–	–	–	–	−	−	−	5
Belgium	–	–	–	–	–	–	–	–	–	–	–	RR	RR	RR	RR	RR	–	–	–	–	–	–	F	–	–	–	–	–	–	RR	−	RR	−	8
Bulgaria	–	–	–	–	–	–	–	–	–	–	–	–	–	–	–	–	–	–	–	–	–	–	–	RR	–	–	–	-	–	–	−	−	−	1
Canada	–	–	–	–	–	–	–	–	–	–	–	–	–	–	–	LQ	–	–	–	–	–	–	–	–	–	RR	RR	–	–	RR	−	−	W	5
China	–	–	–	–	–	–	–	–	–	–	–	–	–	–	–	–	–	LQ	–	–	–	–	–	RR	–	–	–	–	–	–	−	−	−	2
CIS	–	–	–	QF	Defunct																													1
Chinese Taipei	–	–	–	–	–	–	–	–	–	–	–	–	–	–	–	–	–	–	–	RR	RR	–	–	–	–	–	–	–	–	–	−	−	−	2
Croatia	Competed as (Socialist Federal Republic of Yugoslavia)				–	–	–	W	RR	–	–	–	–	–	–	–	–	–	RR	–	–	–	–	–	–	–	–	–	–	–	−	W	RR	5
Czech Republic	Competed as (Czechoslovakia)				SF	W	SF	–	–	–	–	–	–	–	RR	RR	–	–	RR	RR	–	–	–	W	–	RR	RR	RR	RR	–	−	−	−	12
Czechoslovakia	W	SF	QF	F	Defunct																													4
Denmark	–	–	–	–	–	–	–	–	–	–	–	–	–	–	–	–	–	–	–	–	–	–	–	RR	–	–	–	–	–	–	−	RR	−	2
France	RR	QF	SF	QF	SF	QF	SF	RR	RR	F	RR	–	–	RR	–	RR	–	–	RR	RR	RR	–	RR	F	RR	W	RR	RR	W	–	RR	RR	RR	26
Germany	SF	–	1R	SF	W	F	W	RR	RR	RR	–	–	–	–	–	–	RR	RR	–	–	RR	RR	–	–	RR	–	–	RR	RR	F	F	−	−	18
Great Britain	1R	–	1R	1R	–	–	–	–	–	–	–	–	–	–	–	–	–	–	–	–	–	F	RR	–	–	–	RR	RR	RR	–	RR	−	−	9
Greece	–	–	–	–	–	–	–	–	–	–	–	–	–	LQ	–	–	–	–	–	–	–	–	–	–	–	–	–	–	–	–	RR	−	RR	3
Hungary	–	–	–	–	–	–	–	–	–	–	–	–	–	–	–	RR	–	–	–	–	–	–	–	–	–	–	–	–	–	–	−	−	−	1
India	–	–	–	–	–	–	–	–	–	–	–	–	–	–	–	–	–	–	RR	RR	–	–	–	–	–	–	–	–	–	–	−	−	−	2
Israel	–	–	–	–	1R	–	–	–	–	–	–	–	–	–	–	–	–	–	–	–	–	–	–	–	–	–	–	–	–	–	−	−	−	1
Italy	–	QF	1R	–	–	–	–	–	–	–	–	–	–	RR	RR	–	RR	–	–	–	RR	–	RR	–	RR	RR	RR	–	–	–	−	−	F	11
Japan	1R	–	–	1R	1R	–	–	–	–	–	–	LQ	LQ	–	–	–	–	–	–	–	–	–	–	–	–	–	–	–	–	RR	−	−	–	6
Kazakhstan	Competed as (Soviet Union)			–	–	–	–	–	–	–	–	–	–	–	–	–	–	–	–	–	–	RR	RR	–	–	–	–	–	–	–	−	−	–	2
Netherlands	–	1R	1R	QF	–	1R	1R	RR	–	–	–	–	–	–	–	–	RR	F	–	–	–	–	–	–	–	–	–	–	–	–	−	−	–	8
New Zealand	–	1R	–	–	–	–	–	–	–	–	–	–	–	–	–	–	–	–	–	–	–	–	–	–	–	–	–	–	–	–	−	−	–	1
Paraguay	–	–	–	–	–	–	–	–	–	–	–	–	–	–	LQ	–	–	–	–	–	–	–	–	–	–	–	–	–	–	–	−	−	–	1
Poland	–	–	–	–	–	–	–	–	–	–	–	–	–	–	–	–	–	–	–	–	–	–	–	–	–	F	W	–	–	–	−	−	–	2
Romania	–	–	–	–	–	–	–	–	RR	LQ	–	–	–	–	–	–	–	–	–	–	–	RR	–	–	–	–	–	–	–	–	−	−	–	3
Russia	Competed as (Soviet Union)			–	–	–	–	–	–	–	–	–	RR	–	–	RR	RR	RR	W	–	F	RR	–	–	–	–	–	–	–	RR	−	−	–	8
Serbia	Competed as (Socialist Federal Republic of Yugoslavia)																		–	F	–	–	RR	–	F	–	–	–	–	–	−	−	–	3
Serbia and Montenegro	Competed as (Socialist Federal Republic of Yugoslavia)			–	–	–	–	–	–	–	–	–	–	–	–	–	–	RR	Defunct															1
Slovakia	Competed as (Czechoslovakia)				–	–	–	–	–	W	RR	RR	RR	–	RR	F	W	–	–	–	W	–	–	–	–	–	–	–	–	–	−	−	–	8
South Africa	–	–	–	–	1R	1R	1R	RR	F	RR	RR	W	RR	–	–	–	–	–	–	–	–	–	–	–	RR	–	–	–	–	–	−	−	–	10
Soviet Union	–	QF	QF	Defunct																														2
Spain	–	W	QF	SF	F	QF	QF	–	–	RR	RR	–	–	W	RR	–	–	–	F	–	–	W	–	RR	W	RR	–	–	RR	–	RR	RR	RR	19
Sweden	SF	1R	–	1R	–	1R	1R	–	–	RR	F	RR	–	–	–	–	–	RR	–	–	–	–	–	–	–	–	–	–	–	–	−	−	–	9
Switzerland	–	–	SF	W	QF	QF	–	F	RR	–	RR	–	W	RR	–	–	–	–	–	–	–	–	–	–	–	–	–	–	RR	W	W	F	–	13
Thailand	–	–	–	–	–	–	–	–	–	–	–	F	RR	–	–	–	–	–	–	–	–	–	–	–	–	–	–	–	–	–	−	−	–	2
Ukraine	Competed as (Soviet Union)			–	QF	1R	F	–	–	–	–	–	–	–	–	–	–	–	–	–	–	–	–	–	–	–	–	F	–	–	−	−	–	4
United States	–	F	F	QF	QF	QF	QF	RR	W	RR	RR	RR	F	F	W	W	RR	W	RR	W	RR	RR	W	RR	RR	RR	F	RR	F	RR	RR	−	–	30
Uzbekistan	Competed as (Soviet Union)			–	–	–	–	–	–	–	–	–	–	–	RR	–	–	–	–	–	–	–	–	–	–	–	–	–	–	–	−	−	–	1
Yugoslavia	1R	1R	W	–	Defunct																													3
Zimbabwe	–	–	–	–	–	–	–	–	–	–	LQ	–	–	–	–	–	LQ	–	–	–	–	–	–	–	–	–	–	–	–	–	−	−	–	2
Total	8	12	12	12	12	12	12	8	8	8	8	8	8	8	8	8	8	8	8	8	8	8	8	8	8	8	8	8	8	8	8	6	6	

=== Statistics by team ===
After 2019 edition Note 1: Teams with index 2 include results only of lower placed team of every appearance in the tournament in instances where two teams from the same country entered the tournament, while team with no index includes results of higher placed team only.
Note 2: Considering there is an extremely high frequency of retirements due to various reasons w.o. wins/defeats are counted in all statistics.
Note 3: "Y Ent" statistic is not complete. Information about Asian Hopman Cup, a qualifying tournament that ran from 2006 until 2009 and granted the winners entry into the Hopman Cup the following year, is missing.

Italic	non-existing teams (3)
	most (best or worst) in category & best and worst % in last 2 columns highlighted are best and worst +/- ratio

Hopman Cup team (41 teams + 3 (Note: Czechoslovakia, Soviet Union/CIS, Yugoslavia SFR.) dissolved)	TOP 4 (Note: Since 1996 competition has group stage (2 groups) format where 1st team from each group advances to finals. Column "All" contains placements in top 2 of each group (meaning top 4; reason below) since 1996 + semi-final appearances before that period; between 1989 and 1995 competition had knockout tournament format, and column "SF" contains semi-final appearances from that period only. On multiple occasions 2nd placed team in the group replaced that group's 1st placed team in the finals due to latter's retirement.)		Y Ent (Note: Years Entered is a number of times a team has entered qualifications (qualifying tournament) for the tournament, play-off tie or played in the actual tournament; in other words participated in any way in the tournament. Y Ent >= Y Pld.)	Y Pld (Note: Years played is a number of times a team has played in the actual tournament. Sometimes, despite the fact they lost in the play-off tie, a team would play in the official tournament as a replacement due to retirement of other team. Those instances are noted after plus sign as "partial participations" since those teams were (in all cases) unable to qualify for the finals. Y Pld <= Y Ent.)	RoW (Note: RoW / Hopman Cup RoW includes qualification play-off ties. RoW including qualifying tournament ties if better than HC RoW is indicated in () parentheses alongside the HC RoW.)	W%	T Pld (Note: Does not include qualification play-off ties nor qualifying tournament ties.)	W	L	Q PO W-L	AHC (Note: Asian Hopman Cup was a qualifying tournament that ran from 2006 until 2009 and granted the winners entry into the Hopman Cup the following year.)	
Hopman Cup team (41 teams + 3 dissolved)	All	SF	Y Ent	Y Pld	RoW	W%	T Pld	W	L	Q PO W-L	W-L	T
Argentina	1	0	5	5	3	0.29	14	4	10	0–0	—	—
Australia	12	3	31	31	4	0.46	91	42	49	0–0	—	—
Australia 2	0	0	1	1	—	0.33	3	1	2	0–0	—	—
Austria	2	1	1	1	5	0.55	11	6	5	0–0	—	—
Belgium	3	0	7	7	2	0.52	21	11	10	1–0	—	—
Bulgaria	1	0	1	1	2	0.67	3	2	1	0–0	—	—
Canada	2	0	4	3+1	2	0.40	10	4	6	0–1	—	—
China	0	0	2	1	0	0.00	3	0	3	0–1		0
Chinese Taipei	0	0	2	2	1 (3)	0.17	6	1	5	0–0		2
Croatia	2	0	3	3	4	0.60	10	6	4	0–0	—	—
Czech Republic (Note: Does not include Czechoslovakia results (see Czechoslovakia note).)	7	3	12	12	6	0.54	65	19	16	0–0	—	—
Czechoslovakia (Note: Out of 5 players that played for Czechoslovakia at Hopman Cup 4 were Czech. The team that won Czechoslovakia's only title included Slovak player.)	3	3	4	4	4	0.73	11	8	3	0–0	—	—
Denmark	0	0	1	1	1	0.33	3	1	2	0–0	—	—
France	11	3	24	24	5	0.52	64	33	31	1–0	—	—
Germany	10	6	18	18	6	0.49	53	26	27	0–0	—	—
Great Britain	3	0	9	9	3	0.41	22	9	13	0–0	—	—
Greece	1	0	2	1	2	0.66	3	2	1	0–1	—	—
Hungary	0	0	1	1	1	0.33	3	1	2	1–0	—	—
India	2	0	2	2	2 (5)	0.50	6	3	3	0–0		1
Israel	0	0	1	1	0	0.00	1	0	1	0–0	—	—
Italy	2	0	10	10	3	0.33	27	9	18	1–0	—	—
Japan	0	0	6	4+1	1	0.14	7	1	6	0–2		0
Kazakhstan	1	0	2	2	2 (3)	0.33	6	2	4	0–0		1
Netherlands	1	0	8	8	4	0.31	16	5	11	2–0	—	—
New Zealand	0	0	1	1	0	0.00	1	0	1	0–0	—	—
Paraguay	0	0	1	0	0	—	0	0	0	0–1	—	—
Philippines	0	0	1	0	0	—	0	0	0	0–0		0
Poland	2	0	2	2	3	0.75	8	6	2	0–0	—	—
Romania	0	0	3	2	1	0.33	6	2	4	0–1	—	—
Russia (Note: Does not include Soviet Union and CIS results (see Soviet Union & CIS note).)	3	0	8	8	6	0.42	26	11	15	0–0	—	—
Serbia (Note: Includes Serbia and Montenegro results (1 appearance) because only players from Serbia represented the team.)	4	0	4	4	5	0.71	14	10	4	0–0	—	—
Slovakia	4	0	8	8	7	0.56	27	15	12	1–0	—	—
South Africa	5	0	10	10	4	0.58	26	15	11	0–0	—	—
South Korea	0	0	2	0	0	—	0	0	0	0–0		0
Soviet Union & CIS (Note: Out of 3 players that played for Soviet Union and CIS at Hopman Cup 2 were Russian.)	0	0	3	3	1	0.25	4	1	3	0–0	—	—
Spain	9	3	17	17	6	0.60	47	28	19	0–0	—	—
Sweden	3	1	9	9	3	0.37	19	7	12	0–0	—	—
Switzerland	8	3	12	12	6	0.70	37	26	11	0–0	—	—
Thailand	1	0	4	4	3	0.43	7	3	4	1–0		0
Ukraine	2	1	4	4	3	0.64	11	7	4	0–0	—	—
United States	18	2	30	30	9	0.57	92	52	40	0–0	—	—
Uzbekistan	0	0	1	1	1	0.00	3	0	3	1–0		0
Yugoslavia, SFR (Note: Players from Croatia, Serbia and Slovenia represented SFR Yugoslavia at Hopman Cup.)	1	1	3	3	4	0.67	6	4	2	0–0	—	—
Zimbabwe	0	0	2	0+1	0	0.00	1	0	1	0–2	—	—

== Asian Hopman Cup ==
2006
Host: India	Winner: India	Participants: China, Chinese Taipei, India, Japan, Philippines, Thailand
Group A	Group B	Final
1. India (RR W-L: 2–0; match W-L: 6–0); 2. China (RR W-L: 1–1; match W-L: 2–4); 3. Japan (RR W-L: 0–2; match W-L: 1–5)	1. Chinese Taipei (RR W-L: 2–0; match W-L: 6–0); 2. Thailand (RR W-L: 1–1; match W-L: 2–4); 3. Philippines (RR W-L: 0–2; match W-L: 1–5)	India d Chinese Taipei 3–0
India d China 3–0; India d Japan 3–0; China d Japan 2–1	Chinese Taipei d Thailand 3–0; Chinese Taipei d Philippines 3–0; Thailand d Philippines 2–1	

2007
Host: Thailand	Winner: Chinese Taipei	Participants: China, Chinese Taipei, Japan, South Korea, Thailand, Uzbekistan
Group A	Group B	Final
1. Thailand (RR W-L: 2–0; match W-L: 5–0); 2. South Korea (RR W-L: 1–1; match W-L: 3–2); 3. China (RR W-L: 0–2; match W-L: 0–6)	1. Chinese Taipei (RR W-L: 2–0; match W-L: 5–1); 2. Japan (RR W-L: 1–1; match W-L: 3–3); 3. Uzbekistan (RR W-L: 0–2; match W-L: 1–5)	Chinese Taipei d Thailand 2–1
Thailand d South Korea 2–0; Thailand d China 3–0; South Korea d China 3–0	Chinese Taipei d Japan 2–1; Chinese Taipei d Uzbekistan 3–0; Japan d Uzbekistan 2–1	

2008
Host: Kazakhstan	Winner: Chinese Taipei	Participants: China, Chinese Taipei, India, Kazakhstan, South Korea, Thailand
Group A	Group B	Final
1. Chinese Taipei (RR W-L: 2–0; match W-L: 6–0); 2. India (RR W-L: 1–1; match W-L: 2–4); 3. South Korea (RR W-L: 0–2; match W-L: 1–5)	1. Kazakhstan (RR W-L: 2–0; match W-L: 5–1); 2. Thailand (RR W-L: 1–1; match W-L: 3–3); 3. China (RR W-L: 0–2; match W-L: 1–5)	Chinese Taipei d Kazakhstan 2-0
Chinese Taipei d India 3–0; Chinese Taipei d South Korea 3–0; India d South Korea 2–1	Kazakhstan d Thailand 2–1; Kazakhstan d China 3–0; Thailand d China 2–1	

2009
Host: Kazakhstan	Winner: Kazakhstan	Participants: China, Chinese Taipei, India, Kazakhstan, Thailand
Group A	Group B	Final
Kazakhstan d India 2–1; China d India 2–1	Thailand; Chinese Taipei; South Korea	Kazakhstan d Chinese Taipei 2-1
