= Great Britain at the Hopman Cup =

Sporting event delegation

Great Britain
- First year: 1989
- Years played: 9
- Runners-up: 1
- Best finish: F (2010)
- Most total wins: Andy Murray (18–8)
- Most singles wins: Andy Murray (11–2)
- Most doubles wins: Andy Murray (7–6)
- Best doubles team: Andy Murray & Heather Watson (4–2)
- Most years played: Andy Murray (4)

Great Britain is a nation that has competed at eight Hopman Cup tournaments and appeared in the first edition in 1989. Great Britain's best result is finishing runner-up to Spain at the 2010 Hopman Cup. Their most successful player is Andy Murray, who was one of that year's finalists.

== Players ==
This is a list of players who have played for Great Britain in the Hopman Cup.

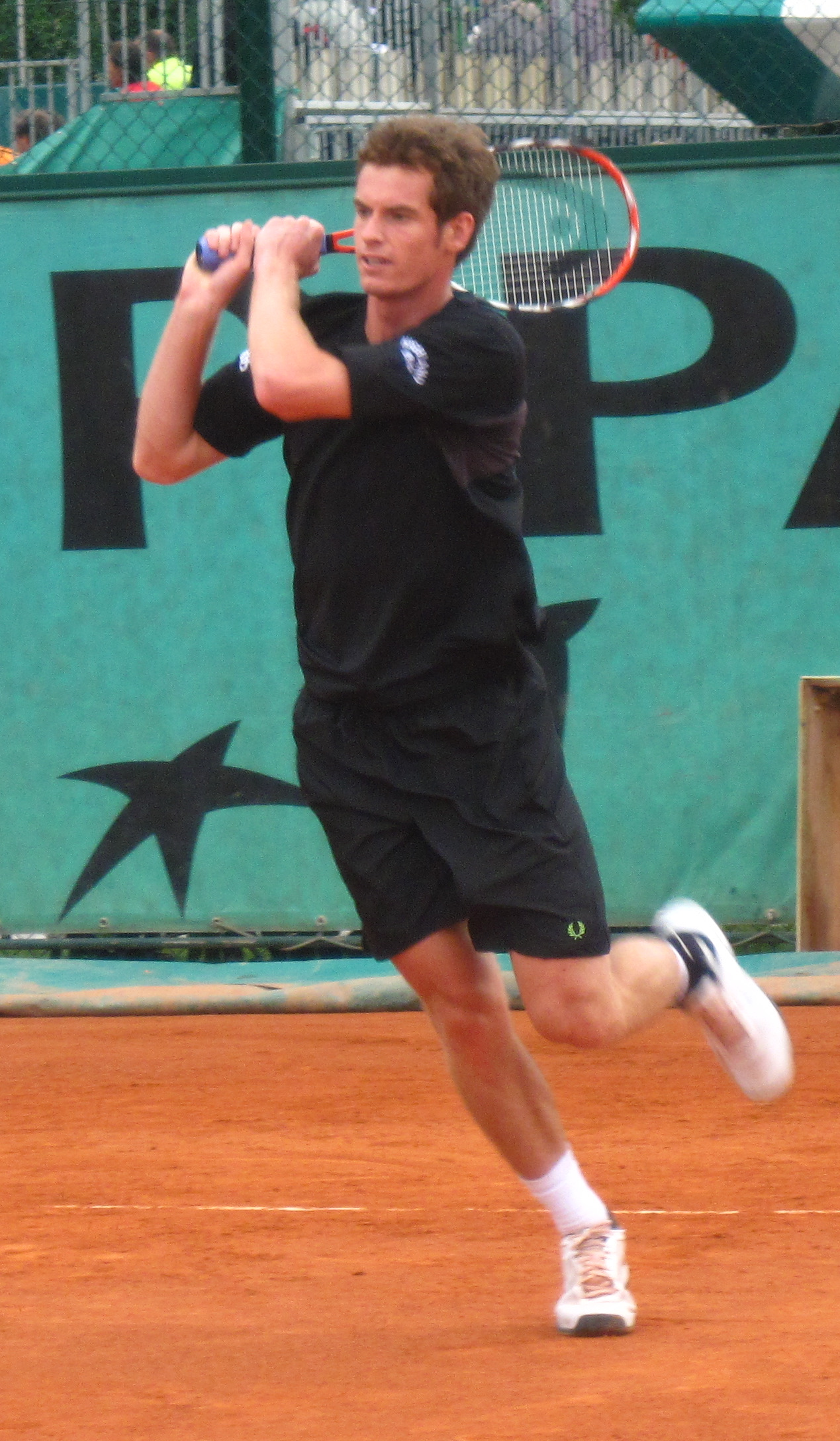
Andy Murray is the most successful British player at the Hopman Cup

Name	Total W–L	Singles W–L	Doubles W–L	First year played	No. of years played
Jeremy Bates	1–5	0–3	1–2	1989	3
Katie Boulter	2−4	0−3	2−1	2019	1
Jo Durie	1–1	0–1	1–0	1992	1
Daniel Evans	0–6	0–3	0–3	2017	1
Sarah Loosemore	1–3	1–1	0–2	1989	2
Andy Murray	18–8	11–2	7–6	2010	4
Cameron Norrie	4−2	2−1	2−1	2019	1
Laura Robson	4–10	1–6	3–4	2010	2
Heather Watson	8–10	4–5	4–5	2015	3

== Results ==
Year	Round	Location	Opponent	Score	Result
1989	Round One	Burswood Dome, Perth	Australia	0–3	Lost
1991	Round One	Burswood Dome, Perth	Australia	1–2	Lost
1992	Round One	Burswood Dome, Perth	(Commonwealth of Independent States) CIS	1–2	Lost
2010	Round Robin	Burswood Dome, Perth	Kazakhstan	2–1	Won
2010	Round Robin	Burswood Dome, Perth	Germany	2–1	Won
2010	Round Robin	Burswood Dome, Perth	Russia	2–1	Won
2010	Final	Burswood Dome, Perth	Spain	1–2	Lost
2011	Round Robin	Burswood Dome, Perth	Italy	1–2	Lost
2011	Round Robin	Burswood Dome, Perth	France	1–2	Lost
2011	Round Robin	Burswood Dome, Perth	United States	1–2	Lost
2015	Round Robin	Perth Arena, Perth	France	2–1	Won
2015	Round Robin	Perth Arena, Perth	Poland	1–2	Lost
2015	Round Robin	Perth Arena, Perth	Australia	3–0	Won
2016	Round Robin	Perth Arena, Perth	France	2–1	Won
2016	Round Robin	Perth Arena, Perth	Australia	1–2	Lost
2016	Round Robin	Perth Arena, Perth	Germany	3–0	Won
2017	Round Robin	Perth Arena, Perth	Switzerland	0–3	Lost
2017	Round Robin	Perth Arena, Perth	France	0–3	Lost
2017	Round Robin	Perth Arena, Perth	Germany	1–2	Lost
2019	Round Robin	Perth Arena, Perth	Greece	2–1	Won
2019	Round Robin	Perth Arena, Perth	Switzerland	0–3	Lost
2019	Round Robin	Perth Arena, Perth	United States	2–1	Won
