= Kazakhstan at the Hopman Cup =

About Kazakhstan's participation in the Hopman Cup

Kazakhstan
- First year: 2010
- Years played: 2
- Best finish: 2nd place, Group B (2010)
- Most total wins: Yaroslava Shvedova (3–4); Andrey Golubev (3–8)
- Most singles wins: Yaroslava Shvedova (2–2); Andrey Golubev (2–4)
- Most doubles wins: Yaroslava Shvedova (1–2); Andrey Golubev (1–4)
- Best doubles team: Yaroslava Shvedova & Andrey Golubev (1–2)
- Most years played: Yaroslava Shvedova (2); Andrey Golubev (2)

Kazakhstan is a nation that has competed at two Hopman Cup tournaments and first competed in the 22nd Hopman Cup in 2010. Its best result to date is finishing second in their group in 2010.

Before its dissolution, Kazakhstan used to form part of the Soviet Union which also competed at the Hopman Cup on two occasions in the early 1990s. Additionally, Kazakhstan is a member of the CIS which entered a team into the 1992 event.

Kazakhstan also participated a number of times in the now defunct Asian Hopman Cup, a qualifying tournament which ran from 2006 until 2009 and granted the winners entry into the Hopman Cup the following year. In 2008 and 2009 Kazakhstan hosted the event in Astana finishing as the runners-up to Chinese Taipei in 2008 and winning in 2009 to grant them access to the main tournament in Australia for the first time.

== Players ==
This is a list of players who have played for Kazakhstan in the Hopman Cup.

Name	Total W–L	Singles W–L	Doubles W–L	First year played	No. of years played
Andrey Golubev	3–8	2–4	1–4	2010	2
Sesil Karatantcheva ^{1}	0–4	0–2	0–2	2011	1
Yaroslava Shvedova	3–4	2–2	1–2	2010	2

^{1} Karatantcheva replaced Shvedova after the first tie in 2011 due to a knee injury sustained by Shvedova.

== Results ==
Year	Competition	Location	Opponent	Score	Result
2010 ^{1}	Round Robin	Burswood Dome, Perth	Great Britain	1–2	Lost
2010 ^{1}	Round Robin	Burswood Dome, Perth	Russia	2–1	Won
2010 ^{1}	Round Robin	Burswood Dome, Perth	Germany	2–0	Won
2011	Round Robin	Burswood Dome, Perth	Serbia	0–3	Lost
2011	Round Robin	Burswood Dome, Perth	Belgium	0–3	Lost
2011	Round Robin	Burswood Dome, Perth	Australia	0–3	Lost

^{1} In 2010, the mixed doubles dead rubber against Germany was not played.

== See also ==
- CIS at the Hopman Cup
- Soviet Union at the Hopman Cup
