= CIS at the Hopman Cup =

Sporting event delegation

Commonwealth of Independent States
- First year: 1992
- Years played: 1
- Best finish: Quarterfinals (1992)
- Most total wins: Andrei Cherkasov (2–2)
- Most singles wins: Andrei Cherkasov (2–0)
- Most doubles wins: Andrei Cherkasov (0–2); Natalia Zvereva (0–2)
- Best doubles team: Natalia Zvereva & Andrei Cherkasov (0–2)
- Most years played: Natalia Zvereva (1); Andrei Cherkasov (1)

The Commonwealth of Independent States (or CIS) is a regional organisation formed of former Soviet states that competed at the Hopman Cup in 1992. It reached the quarterfinal stage of the tournament.

Since 1992, four of the independent states which form the CIS have competed in the Hopman Cup individually. These are: Kazakhstan, Russia, Ukraine and Uzbekistan. Prior to 1992, they all competed as the Soviet Union.

== Players ==
This is a list of players who have played for the CIS in the Hopman Cup.

| Name | Total W–L | Singles W–L | Doubles W–L | First year played | No. of years played |
|---|---|---|---|---|---|
| Andrei Cherkasov | 2–2 | 2–0 | 0–2 | 1992 | 1 |
| Natalia Zvereva | 1–3 | 1–1 | 0–2 | 1992 | 1 |

== Results ==
| Year | Competition | Location | Opponent | Score | Result |
|---|---|---|---|---|---|
| 1992 | Round One | Burswood Dome, Perth | Great Britain | 2–1 | Won |
| 1992 | Quarterfinals | Burswood Dome, Perth | Switzerland | 1–2 | Lost |

== See also ==
Kazakhstan at the Hopman Cup
Russia at the Hopman Cup
Soviet Union at the Hopman Cup
Ukraine at the Hopman Cup
Uzbekistan at the Hopman Cup
