= 1991 Hopman Cup =

- Date: 27 December 1990 – 4 January 1991
- Edition: III
- Surface: Hard indoor
- Location: Perth, Western Australia
- Venue: Burswood Entertainment Complex

Champions
- Yugoslavia
← 1990 ·	Hopman Cup	· 1992 →

The 1991 Hopman Cup was the third edition of the Hopman Cup, an international mixed teams tournament played at the Burswood Entertainment Complex in Perth, Western Australia. The event was held from 27 December 1990 through 4 January 1991.

Twelve teams competed in the tournament with the top four seeded teams (United States, Spain, Switzerland and the Soviet Union) each receiving a bye into the quarter-finals. The remaining eight teams played in the first round. In the final which was played on 4 January, Yugoslav pair, Goran Prpić and Monica Seles won both of their singles matches to defeat the American pair, Zina Garrison and David Wheaton without needing to go with the mixed doubles (which was also won by Yugoslavia).

== Teams ==
=== Seeds ===
1. United States – Zina Garrison and David Wheaton (finalists)
2. Spain – Arantxa Sánchez Vicario and Emilio Sánchez (quarterfinalists)
3. Switzerland – Manuela Maleeva-Fragniere and Jakob Hlasek (semifinalists)
4. Soviet Union – Natalia Zvereva and Andrei Chesnokov (quarterfinalists)
5. Australia – Elizabeth Smylie and Pat Cash (quarterfinalists)
6. Yugoslavia – Monica Seles and Goran Prpić (champions)
7. Czechoslovakia – Regina Rajchrtová and Petr Korda (quarterfinalists)
8. France – Catherine Tanvier and Guy Forget (semifinalists)

=== Unseeded ===
- United Kingdom – Sarah Loosemore and Jeremy Bates (first round)
- Germany – Isabel Cueto and Carl-Uwe Steeb (first round)
- Italy – Raffaella Reggi and Paolo Canè (first round)
- Netherlands – Manon Bollegraf and Michiel Schapers (first round)

== Draw ==
First Round
Germany	1
7	Czechoslovakia	2
(United Kingdom) Great Britain	1
5	Australia	2
6	Yugoslavia	3
Italy	0
8	France	2
Netherlands	1

Quarterfinals
1	United States	2
7	Czechoslovakia	1
3	Switzerland	3
5	Australia	0
6	Yugoslavia	2
4	Soviet Union	1
8	France	2
2	Spain	1

Semifinals
1	United States	2
3	Switzerland	1
6	Yugoslavia	2
8	France	1

Final
1	United States	0
6	Yugoslavia	3

== First round ==
The opening match of the 1991 Hopman Cup featured local Elizabeth Smylie and Pat Cash taking on Great Britain pair in Sarah Loosemore and Jeremy Bates. Despite losing the opening tie in straight sets, Australia qualified through to the quarter-finals in the mixed doubles.

=== Australia vs. Great Britain ===
Australia
2
Burswood Entertainment Complex, Perth
27 December 1990
Hard (indoor)

Great Britain
1

			1	2	3
1	(Australia) (United Kingdom)	Elizabeth Smylie; Sarah Loosemore	4; 6	3; 6
2	(Australia) (United Kingdom)	Pat Cash; Jeremy Bates	6; 1	6; 1
3	(Australia) (United Kingdom)	Elizabeth Smylie / Pat Cash; Sarah Loosemore / Jeremy Bates	6; 4	6; 2

=== Czechoslovakia vs. Germany ===
Czechoslovakia
2
Burswood Entertainment Complex, Perth
28 December 1990
Hard (indoor)

Germany
1

			1	2	3
1	(Czechoslovakia) (Germany)	Regina Rajchrtová; Isabel Cueto	6; 2	2; 6	4; 6
2	(Czechoslovakia) (Germany)	Petr Korda; Carl-Uwe Steeb	6; 3	2; 6	6; 2
3	(Czechoslovakia) (Germany)	Regina Rajchrtová / Petr Korda; Isabel Cueto / Carl-Uwe Steeb	6; 1	6; 3

=== Yugoslavia vs. Italy ===
Yugoslavia
3
Burswood Entertainment Complex, Perth
27 December 1990 – 4 January 1991
Hard (indoor)

Italy
0

			1	2	3
1	(Socialist Federal Republic of Yugoslavia) (Italy)	Monica Seles; Raffaella Reggi	6; 2	6; 7	6; 4
2	(Socialist Federal Republic of Yugoslavia) (Italy)	Goran Prpić; Paolo Canè	6; 4	6; 3
3	(Socialist Federal Republic of Yugoslavia) (Italy)	Monica Seles / Goran Prpić; Raffaella Reggi / Paolo Canè	8; 3

=== France vs. Netherlands ===
France
2
Burswood Entertainment Complex, Perth
27 December 1990 – 4 January 1991
Hard (indoor)

Netherlands
1

			1	2	3
1	(France) (Netherlands)	Catherine Tanvier; Manon Bollegraf	6; 3	6; 4
2	(France) (Netherlands)	Guy Forget; Michiel Schapers	6; 4	6; 4
3	(France) (Netherlands)	Catherine Tanvier / Guy Forget; Manon Bollegraf / Michiel Schapers	5; 8

== Quarterfinals ==
=== United States vs. Czechoslovakia ===
United States
2
Burswood Entertainment Complex, Perth
27 December 1990 – 4 January 1991
Hard (indoor)

Czechoslovakia
1

			1	2	3
1	(United States) (Czechoslovakia)	Zina Garrison; Regina Rajchrtová	6; 4	6; 4
2	(United States) (Czechoslovakia)	David Wheaton; Petr Korda	6; 4	6; 2
3	(United States) (Czechoslovakia)	Zina Garrison / David Wheaton; Regina Rajchrtová / Petr Korda	1; 8

=== Yugoslavia vs. Soviet Union ===
Yugoslavia
2
Burswood Entertainment Complex, Perth
27 December 1990 – 4 January 1991
Hard (indoor)

Soviet Union
1

			1	2	3
1	(Socialist Federal Republic of Yugoslavia) (Soviet Union)	Monica Seles; Natalia Zvereva	6; 2	6; 1
2	(Socialist Federal Republic of Yugoslavia) (Soviet Union)	Goran Prpić; Andrei Chesnokov	6; 7	6; 3	2; 6
3	(Socialist Federal Republic of Yugoslavia) (Soviet Union)	Monica Seles / Goran Prpić; Natalia Zvereva / Andrei Chesnokov	7; 5	6; 4

=== Switzerland vs. Australia ===
Switzerland
3
Burswood Entertainment Complex, Perth
27 December 1990 – 4 January 1991
Hard (indoor)

Australia
0

			1	2	3
1	(Switzerland) (Australia)	Manuela Maleeva-Fragniere; Elizabeth Smylie	6; 0	6; 0
2	(Switzerland) (Australia)	Jakob Hlasek; Pat Cash	6; 2	6; 4
3	(Switzerland) (Australia)	Manuela Maleeva-Fragniere / Jakob Hlasek; Elizabeth Smylie / Pat Cash	8; 6

=== France vs. Spain ===
France
2
Burswood Entertainment Complex, Perth
27 December 1990 – 4 January 1991
Hard (indoor)

Spain
1

			1	2	3
1	(France) (Spain)	Catherine Tanvier; Arantxa Sánchez Vicario	4; 6	3; 6
2	(France) (Spain)	Guy Forget; Emilio Sánchez	6; 4	6; 2
3	(France) (Spain)	Catherine Tanvier / Guy Forget; Arantxa Sánchez Vicario / Emilio Sánchez	6; 4	6; 2

== Semifinals ==
=== Yugoslavia vs. France ===
Yugoslavia
2
Burswood Entertainment Complex, Perth
27 December 1990 – 4 January 1991
Hard (indoor)

France
1

			1	2	3
1	(Socialist Federal Republic of Yugoslavia) (France)	Monica Seles; Catherine Tanvier	6; 2	6; 3
2	(Socialist Federal Republic of Yugoslavia) (France)	Goran Prpić; Guy Forget	4; 6	3; 6
3	(Socialist Federal Republic of Yugoslavia) (France)	Monica Seles / Goran Prpić; Catherine Tanvier / Guy Forget	5; 7	6; 4	6; 4

=== United States vs. Switzerland ===
United States
2
Burswood Entertainment Complex, Perth
27 December 1990 – 4 January 1991
Hard (indoor)

Switzerland
1

			1	2	3
1	(United States) (Switzerland)	Zina Garrison; Manuela Maleeva-Fragniere	6; 2	7; 5
2	(United States) (Switzerland)	David Wheaton; Jakob Hlasek	3; 6	2; 6
3	(United States) (Switzerland)	Zina Garrison / David Wheaton; Manuela Maleeva-Fragniere / Jakob Hlasek	7; 5	6; 2

== Final ==
=== Yugoslavia vs. United States ===
Yugoslavia
3
Burswood Entertainment Complex, Perth
27 December 1990 – 4 January 1991
Hard (indoor)

United States
0

			1	2	3
1	(Socialist Federal Republic of Yugoslavia) (United States)	Monica Seles; Zina Garrison	6; 1	6; 1
2	(Socialist Federal Republic of Yugoslavia) (United States)	Goran Prpić; David Wheaton	4; 6	6; 3	7; 5
3	(Socialist Federal Republic of Yugoslavia) (United States)	Monica Seles / Goran Prpić; Zina Garrison / David Wheaton	8; 3

1991 Hopman Cup Champions
(Socialist Federal Republic of Yugoslavia)
Yugoslavia
First title
