= Soviet Union at the Hopman Cup =

Sporting event delegation

Soviet Union
- First year: 1990
- Years played: 2
- Best finish: Quarterfinals (1990, 1991)
- Most total wins: Andrei Chesnokov (1–3)
- Most singles wins: Andrei Chesnokov (1–1)
- Most doubles wins: Andrei Chesnokov (0–2); Natalia Zvereva (0–2)
- Best doubles team: Natalia Zvereva & Andrei Chesnokov (0–2)
- Most years played: Natalia Zvereva (2); Andrei Chesnokov (2)

The Soviet Union is a nation that competed at two consecutive Hopman Cup tournaments and first competed in the 2nd Hopman Cup in 1990. The Soviet Union never won a tie and as such never passed the quarterfinal stage of the tournament.

Since the dissolution of the Soviet Union at the end of 1991, four of the fifteen independent states formed from the former Soviet Union have competed in the Hopman Cup. These are: Kazakhstan, Russia, Ukraine and Uzbekistan. Additionally, the Commonwealth of Independent States also entered a team into the 1992 event.

== Players ==
This is a list of players who have played for the Soviet Union in the Hopman Cup.

Name	Total W–L	Singles W–L	Doubles W–L	First year played	No. of years played
Andrei Chesnokov	1–3	1–1	0–2	1990	2
Natalia Zvereva	0–4	0–2	0–2	1990	2

== Results ==
Year	Competition	Location	Opponent	Score	Result
1990	Quarterfinals	Burswood Dome, Perth	Australia	0–3	Lost
1991	Quarterfinals	Burswood Dome, Perth	Yugoslavia	1–2	Lost

== See also ==
CIS at the Hopman Cup
Kazakhstan at the Hopman Cup
Russia at the Hopman Cup
Ukraine at the Hopman Cup
Uzbekistan at the Hopman Cup
