= Sweden at the Hopman Cup =

Sporting event delegation

Sweden
- First year: 1989
- Years played: 8
- Runners-up: 1

Sweden is a nation that has competed at the Hopman Cup tournament on eight occasions, their first appearance coming at the 1st annual staging of the event in 1989. They have been runner-up in one tournament in 1999.

== Players ==
This is a list of players who have played for Sweden at the Hopman Cup.

Name	First year played	No. of years played
Sofia Arvidsson	2006	1
Jonas Björkman	1999	2
Åsa Carlsson	1995	4
Thomas Enqvist	1998	1
Thomas Johansson	2006	1
Catarina Lindqvist	1989	3
Maria Lindström	1990	1
Peter Lundgren	1992	1
Mikael Pernfors	1989	3
Mats Wilander	1995	1
