= Yugoslavia at the Hopman Cup =

Yugoslavia's participation in a sporting event

Yugoslavia
- First year: 1989
- Years played: 3
- Hopman Cup titles: 1 (1991)
- Most total wins: Monica Seles (8–0)
- Most singles wins: Monica Seles (4–0)
- Most doubles wins: Monica Seles (4–0); Goran Prpić (4–0)
- Best doubles team: Monica Seles & Goran Prpić (4–0)
- Most years played: Slobodan Živojinović (2)

Yugoslavia is a nation that competed at three consecutive Hopman Cup tournaments before the breakup of the country in the early 1990s. It first competed in the inaugural Hopman Cup in 1989. Yugoslavia won the tournament on one occasion, in 1991.

== Players ==
This is a list of players who have played for Yugoslavia in the Hopman Cup.

Name	Total W–L	Singles W–L	Doubles W–L	First year played	No. of years played
Sabrina Goleš	0–2	0–1	0–1	1990	1
Goran Prpić	6–2	2–2	4–0	1991	1
Monica Seles	8–0	4–0	4–0	1991	1
Karmen Škulj	0–2	0–1	0–1	1989	1
Slobodan Živojinović	0–4	0–2	0–2	1989	2

== Results ==
Year	Competition	Location	Opponent	Score	Result
1989	First Round	Burswood Dome, Perth	Sweden	0–3	Lost
1990	First Round	Burswood Dome, Perth	Australia	0–3	Lost
1991	First Round	Burswood Dome, Perth	Italy	3–0	Won
1991	Quarterfinals	Burswood Dome, Perth	Soviet Union	2–1	Won
1991	Semifinals	Burswood Dome, Perth	France	2–1	Won
1991	Final	Burswood Dome, Perth	United States	3–0	Won

== See also ==
- Croatia at the Hopman Cup
- Serbia and Montenegro at the Hopman Cup
- Yugoslavia Davis Cup team
- Yugoslavia Fed Cup team
