= Škulj =

Škulj is a surname. Notable people with the surname include:

- Irena Škulj (born 1946), Yugoslavian tennis player
- Karmen Škulj (born 1967), Slovenian tennis player
- Maja Živec-Škulj (born 1973), German tennis player
