= 2008 Hopman Cup =

- Date: 29 December 2007 – 4 January 2008
- Edition: XX
- Surface: Hard (indoor)
- Location: Perth, Western Australia
- Venue: Burswood Entertainment Complex

Champions
- United States
← 2007 ·	Hopman Cup	· 2009 →

The 2008 Hopman Cup (also known as the Hyundai Hopman Cup for sponsorship reasons) corresponds to the 20th edition of the Hopman Cup tournament between nations in men's and women's tennis. Eight teams participated in the World Group with one qualifier from the Asian region, Chinese Taipei.

The first matches were held on 29 December 2007, and the final took place on 4 January 2008 at the Burswood Entertainment Complex, Perth, Western Australia.

For the first time in History, Serena Williams and Novak Djokovic faced each other in a competitive event. Williams emerged victorious in the mixed doubles rubber alongside Mardy Fish.

== Teams and seedings ==
1. United States – Serena Williams^{1} (6) and Mardy Fish (39) (champions)
2. Serbia – Jelena Janković (3) and Novak Djokovic (3) (finalists)
3. Czech Republic – Lucie Šafářová (23) and Tomáš Berdych (14)
4. France – Tatiana Golovin (13) and Arnaud Clément (54)
5. Argentina – Gisela Dulko (37) and Juan Ignacio Chela (20)
6. Australia – Alicia Molik (56) and Peter Luczak (79)
7. India – Sania Mirza (31) and Rohan Bopanna (267)
8. Chinese Taipei – Hsieh Su-wei (157) and Lu Yen-hsun (110)
^{1}Due to illness Serena Williams was unable to play the USA's opening tie against India. She was replaced by Meghann Shaughnessy.

== Group A ==
=== Standings ===
Pos.	Country	W	L	Matches	Sets
1.	Serbia	3	0	7 – 2	15 – 8
2.	France	2	1	6 – 3	13 – 7
3.	Chinese Taipei	1	2	3 – 6	9 – 14
4.	Argentina	0	3	2 – 7	7 – 15

=== Serbia vs. Chinese Taipei ===
Serbia
3
Burswood Entertainment Complex, Perth
30 December 2007, 10:30 AWST (UTC+9)
hard (indoors)

Chinese Taipei
0

			1	2	3
1	(Serbia) (Chinese Taipei)	Jelena Janković; Hsieh Su-wei	6; 4	6; 4
2	(Serbia) (Chinese Taipei)	Novak Djokovic; Lu Yen-hsun	7; 5	2; 6	6; 3
3	(Serbia) (Chinese Taipei)	Jelena Janković / Novak Djokovic; Hsieh Su-wei / Lu Yen-hsun	3; 6	6; 2	[10] [8]

=== France vs. Argentina ===
France
2
Burswood Entertainment Complex, Perth
30 December 2007, 18:00 AWST (UTC+9)
hard (indoors)

Argentina
1

			1	2	3
1	(France) (Argentina)	Tatiana Golovin; Gisela Dulko	6; 4	6; 3
2	(France) (Argentina)	Arnaud Clément; Juan Ignacio Chela	3; 6	1; 6
3	(France) (Argentina)	Tatiana Golovin / Arnaud Clément; Gisela Dulko / Juan Ignacio Chela	6; 3	6; 2

=== Serbia vs. France ===
Serbia
2
Burswood Entertainment Complex, Perth
2 January 2008, 10:30 AWST (UTC+9)
hard (indoors)

France
1

			1	2	3
1	(Serbia) (France)	Jelena Janković; Tatiana Golovin	1; 0			retired
2	(Serbia) (France)	Novak Djokovic; Arnaud Clément	6; 3	6; 3
3	(Serbia) (France)	Jelena Janković / Novak Djokovic; Tatiana Golovin / Arnaud Clément	5; 7	6; 4	7^{7} 6^{5}

=== Argentina vs. Chinese Taipei ===
Argentina
0
Burswood Entertainment Complex, Perth
2 January 2008, 18:00 AWST (UTC+9)
hard (indoors)

Chinese Taipei
3

			1	2	3
1	(Argentina) (Chinese Taipei)	Gisela Dulko; Hsieh Su-wei	6; 3	6^{2} 7^{7}	5; 7
2	(Argentina) (Chinese Taipei)	Juan Ignacio Chela; Lu Yen-hsun	3; 6	4; 6
3	(Argentina) (Chinese Taipei)	Gisela Dulko / Juan Ignacio Chela; Hsieh Su-wei / Lu Yen-hsun	6; 3	4; 6	6^{4} 7^{10}

=== Serbia vs. Argentina ===
Serbia
2
Burswood Entertainment Complex, Perth
3 January 2008, 18:00 AWST (UTC+9)
hard (indoors)

Argentina
1

			1	2	3
1	(Serbia) (Argentina)	Jelena Janković; Gisela Dulko	7^{12} 6^{10}			retired
2	(Serbia) (Argentina)	Novak Djokovic; Juan Ignacio Chela	6; 2	6; 3
3	(Serbia) (Argentina)	Jelena Janković / Novak Djokovic; Gisela Dulko / Juan Ignacio Chela	6; 1	3; 6	7^{7} 6^{5}

=== France vs. Chinese Taipei ===
France
3
Burswood Entertainment Complex, Perth
3 January 2008, 18:00 AWST (UTC+9)
hard (indoors)

Chinese Taipei
0

			1	2	3
1	(France) (Chinese Taipei)	Tatiana Golovin; Hsieh Su-wei	6; 1	6; 1
2	(France) (Chinese Taipei)	Arnaud Clément; Lu Yen-hsun	7^{7} 6^{4}	6; 4
3	(France) (Chinese Taipei)	Tatiana Golovin / Arnaud Clément; Hsieh Su-wei / Lu Yen-hsun	6; 4	4; 6	7^{8} 6^{6}

== Group B ==
=== Standings ===
Pos.	Country	W	L	Matches	Sets
1.	United States	3	0	8 – 1	16 – 4
2.	India	1	2	4 – 5	10 – 12
3.	Australia	1	2	3 – 6	8 – 12
4.	Czech Republic	1	2	3 – 6	7 – 13

=== United States vs. India ===
United States
2
Burswood Entertainment Complex, Perth
29 December 2007, 10:30 AWST (UTC+9)
hard (indoors)

India
1

			1	2	3
1	(United States) (India)	Meghann Shaughnessy; Sania Mirza	6; 3	4; 6	6; 3
2	(United States) (India)	Mardy Fish; Rohan Bopanna	6; 2	6; 4
3	(United States) (India)	Meghann Shaughnessy / Mardy Fish; Sania Mirza / Rohan Bopanna	4; 6	4; 6

=== Czech Republic vs. Australia ===
Czech Republic
1
Burswood Entertainment Complex, Perth
29 December 2007, 18:00 AWST (UTC+9)
hard (indoors)

Australia
2

			1	2	3
1	(Czech Republic) (Australia)	Lucie Šafářová; Alicia Molik	5; 7	2; 6
2	(Czech Republic) (Australia)	Tomáš Berdych; Peter Luczak	7^{10} 6^{8}	6; 4
3	(Czech Republic) (Australia)	Lucie Šafářová / Tomáš Berdych; Alicia Molik / Peter Luczak	5; 7	3; 6

=== United States vs. Czech Republic ===
United States
3
Burswood Entertainment Complex, Perth
31 December 2007, 10:30 AWST (UTC+9)
hard (indoors)

Czech Republic
0

			1	2	3
1	(United States) (Czech Republic)	Serena Williams; Lucie Šafářová	6; 0	2; 6	7; 5
2	(United States) (Czech Republic)	Serena Williams / Mardy Fish; Lucie Šafářová / Tomáš Berdych	6; 0			retired
3	(United States) (Czech Republic)	Mardy Fish; Tomáš Berdych				w/o

=== Australia vs. India ===
Australia
1
Burswood Entertainment Complex, Perth
1 January 2008, 10:30 AWST (UTC+9)
hard (indoors)

India
2

			1	2	3
1	(Australia) (India)	Alicia Molik; Sania Mirza	2; 6	6; 2	4; 6
2	(Australia) (India)	Peter Luczak; Rohan Bopanna	7^{7} 6^{2}	6; 3
3	(Australia) (India)	Alicia Molik / Peter Luczak; Sania Mirza / Rohan Bopanna	2; 6	6; 4	6^{12} 7^{14}

=== United States vs. Australia ===
United States
3
Burswood Entertainment Complex, Perth
3 January 2008, 10:30 AWST (UTC+9)
hard (indoors)

Australia
0

			1	2	3
1	(United States) (Australia)	Serena Williams; Alicia Molik	6; 2	7^{10} 6^{8}
2	(United States) (Australia)	Mardy Fish; Peter Luczak	7^{7} 6^{5}	7^{12} 6^{10}
3	(United States) (Australia)	Serena Williams / Mardy Fish; Alicia Molik / Peter Luczak	6; 2	6; 3

=== Czech Republic vs. India ===
Czech Republic
2
Burswood Entertainment Complex, Perth
3 January 2008, 10:30 AWST (UTC+9)
hard (indoors)

India
1

			1	2	3
1	(Czech Republic) (India)	Lucie Šafářová; Sania Mirza	6; 2	4; 6	6; 3
2	(Czech Republic) (India)	Tomáš Berdych; Rohan Bopanna	6; 4	6; 0
3	(Czech Republic) (India)	Lucie Šafářová / Tomáš Berdych; Sania Mirza / Rohan Bopanna	3; 6	2; 6

== Final ==
=== Serbia vs. United States ===
Serbia
1
Burswood Entertainment Complex, Perth
4 January 2008, 18:00 AWST (UTC+9)
hard (indoors)

United States
2

			1	2	3
1	(Serbia) (United States)	Jelena Janković; Serena Williams				w/o
2	(Serbia) (United States)	Novak Djokovic; Mardy Fish	6; 2	6^{4} 7^{7}	7^{7} 6^{4}
3	(Serbia) (United States)	Jelena Janković / Novak Djokovic; Serena Williams / Mardy Fish	6^{5} 7^{7}	2; 6

2008 Hopman Cup Champions
(United States)
United States
Fifth title
