= Croatia at the Hopman Cup =

Sporting event delegation

Croatia
- First year: 1996
- Years played: 5
- Hopman Cup titles: 2 (1996, 2023)
- Most total wins: Goran Ivanišević (9–3)
- Most singles wins: Goran Ivanišević (5–1)
- Most doubles wins: Goran Ivanišević (4–2); Iva Majoli (4–2)
- Best doubles team: Goran Ivanišević & Iva Majoli (4–2)
- Most years played: Goran Ivanišević (2); Iva Majoli (2); Donna Vekić (2)

Croatia is a nation that has competed at three Hopman Cup tournaments since it gained its independence following the breakup of Yugoslavia in the early 1990s. It first competed in the Hopman Cup in 1996 and went on to win the title that year. Sixteen years after last participation (2007) Croatia won second title at 2023.

== Players ==
This is a list of players who have played for Croatia in the Hopman Cup.

Name	Total W–L	Singles W–L	Doubles W–L	First year played	No. of years played
Duje Ajduković	1–3	0–2	1–1	2025	1
Mario Ančić	2–3	2–1	0–2	2007	1
Sanja Ančić	0–5	0–3	0–2	2007	1
Borna Ćorić	4–1	2–1	2–0	2023	1
Goran Ivanišević	9–3	5–1	4–2	1996	2
Iva Majoli	7–6	3–4	4–2	1996	2
Donna Vekić	6–3	3–2	3–1	2023	2

== Results ==
Year	Competition	Location	Opponent	Score	Result
1996 ^{1}	Round Robin	Burswood Dome, Perth	South Africa	1–2	Lost
1996 ^{1}	Round Robin	Burswood Dome, Perth	United States	2–1	Won
1996 ^{1}	Round Robin	Burswood Dome, Perth	France	3–0	Won
1996 ^{1}	Final	Burswood Dome, Perth	Switzerland	2–1	Won
1997	Round Robin	Burswood Dome, Perth	France	3–0	Won
1997	Round Robin	Burswood Dome, Perth	United States	1–2	Lost
1997	Round Robin	Burswood Dome, Perth	Australia	2–1	Won
2007	Round Robin	Burswood Dome, Perth	Spain	0–3	Lost
2007	Round Robin	Burswood Dome, Perth	India	1–2	Lost
2007	Round Robin	Burswood Dome, Perth	Czech Republic	2–1	Won
2023	Round Robin	Nice Lawn Tennis Club, Nice	Belgium	2–1	Won
2023	Round Robin	Nice Lawn Tennis Club, Nice	Spain	2–1	Won
2023	Final	Nice Lawn Tennis Club, Nice	Switzerland	2–0	Won
2025 ^{2}	Round Robin	Fiera del Levante, Bari	Italy	1–2	Loss
2025 ^{2}	Round Robin	Fiera del Levante, Bari	France	1–2	Loss

^{1} In the 1996 final, it came down to the mixed doubles to decide the tournament champions. The Swiss team were forced to retire with the score at 5–5 in the final set when Marc Rosset injured his hand after punching an advertising board in anger.

^{2} In the second round robin tie against France, Donna Vekić withdrew from the mixed doubles match, thus conceding the point and the tie to France.

== See also ==
Yugoslavia at the Hopman Cup
