= Austria at the Hopman Cup =

Sporting event delegation

Austria
- First year: 1990
- Years played: 5
- Best finish: Semifinals (1994)
- Most total wins: Barbara Schett (5–1); Judith Wiesner (5–6)
- Most singles wins: Judith Wiesner (4–2)
- Most doubles wins: Barbara Schett (3–0); Stefan Koubek (3–0)
- Best doubles team: Barbara Schett & Stefan Koubek (3–0)
- Most years played: Judith Wiesner (3)

Austria is a nation that has competed at the Hopman Cup tournament on five occasions. It first competed at the 2nd annual staging in 1990 and its best result to date came in 1994, when it reached the semifinals.

== Players ==
This is a list of players who have played for Austria in the Hopman Cup.

Name	Total W–L	Singles W–L	Doubles W–L	First year played	No. of years played
Alex Antonitsch	2–3	2–1	0–2	1994	1
Stefan Koubek	4–2	1–2	3–0	2000	1
Thomas Muster	3–3	2–1	1–2	1990	2
Barbara Paulus	2–2	1–1	1–1	1990	1
Barbara Schett	5–1	2–1	3–0	2000	1
Horst Skoff	2–2	1–1	1–1	1995	1
Judith Wiesner	5–6	4–2	1–4	1993	3

== Results ==
Year	Competition	Location	Opponent	Score	Result
1990	Round One	Burswood Dome, Perth	New Zealand	3–0	Won
1990	Quarterfinals	Burswood Dome, Perth	Spain	1–2	Lost
1993	Round One	Burswood Dome, Perth	Ukraine	1–2	Lost
1994	Round One	Burswood Dome, Perth	Ukraine	3–0	Won
1994	Quarterfinals	Burswood Dome, Perth	Spain	2–1	Won
1994	Semifinals	Burswood Dome, Perth	Germany	0–3	Lost
1995	Round One	Burswood Dome, Perth	Argentina	2–1	Won
1995	Quarterfinals	Burswood Dome, Perth	Germany	1–2	Lost
2000	Round Robin	Burswood Dome, Perth	Slovakia	2–1	Won
2000	Round Robin	Burswood Dome, Perth	Australia	1–2	Lost
2000	Round Robin	Burswood Dome, Perth	Thailand	2–1	Won
