= Chinese Taipei at the Hopman Cup =

Sporting event delegation

Chinese Taipei
- First year: 2008
- Years played: 2
- Most total wins: Hsieh Su-wei (3–8); Lu Yen-hsun (3–7)
- Most singles wins: Hsieh Su-wei (1–5); Lu Yen-hsun (1–4)
- Most doubles wins: Hsieh Su-wei (2–3); Lu Yen-hsun (2–3)
- Best doubles team: Hsieh Su-wei & Lu Yen-hsun (2–3)
- Most years played: Hsieh Su-wei (2); Lu Yen-hsun (2)

Chinese Taipai competed at the Hopman Cup tournament on two occasions. The nation's first appearance came in 2008 when they qualified for the event by winning the second annual Asian Hopman Cup in 2007. They repeated this feat the following year by again winning the 2008 Asian Hopman Cup and going on to compete in the round robin stages of the main tournament in Australia. They also competed in the Asian Hopman Cup in 2006 and 2009, losing in the final in both years and thus missing out on a spot in the main event both times.

== Players ==
This is a list of players who have played for Chinese Taipei in the Hopman Cup.

Name	Total W–L	Singles W–L	Doubles W–L	First year played	No. of years played
Hsieh Su-wei	3–8	1–5	2–3	2008	2
Lu Yen-hsun	3–7	1–4	2–3	2008	2

== Results ==
Year	Competition	Location	Opponent	Score	Result
2008	Round Robin	Burswood Dome, Perth	Serbia	0–3	Lost
2008	Round Robin	Burswood Dome, Perth	Argentina	3–0	Won
2008	Round Robin	Burswood Dome, Perth	France	0–3	Lost
2009 ^{1}	Round Robin	Burswood Dome, Perth	France	0–3	Lost
2009 ^{1}	Round Robin	Burswood Dome, Perth	Russia	1–2	Lost
2009 ^{1}	Round Robin	Burswood Dome, Perth	Italy	0–3	Lost

^{1} In the final tie of 2009 against Italy, Lu was unable to play his singles match or the mixed doubles. This forfeited two points to Italy, contributing to their 3–0 defeat of Chinese Taipei.
