= 2025 Hopman Cup =

- Date: 16–20 July 2025
- Edition: XXXIII
- Surface: Hard (outdoor)
- Location: Bari, Italy
- Venue: Fiera del Levante

Champions
- Canada
- Hopman Cup

The Hopman Cup XXXIII was the 33rd edition of the Hopman Cup, a tennis tournament between nations in men's and women's tennis. It took place from 16 to 20 July 2025 on hardcourts in Bari, Italy, at the Fiera Del Levante exhibition and convention centre. After a one-year absence, on 3 April 2025, the International Tennis Federation (ITF) announced that the Hopman Cup would return for the 2025 tennis season in July. Canada's Bianca Andreescu and Félix Auger-Aliassime defeated Italy's Lucia Bronzetti and Flavio Cobolli in the final to win their country's first Hopman Cup title.

== Entrants ==
The full list of 12 players who would compete in the event was unveiled on 7 May 2025:

Team	Female player	WTA^{1}	Male player	ATP^{1}	Elimination
Canada	Bianca Andreescu	185	Félix Auger-Aliassime	28	Champions
Croatia	Donna Vekić	52	Duje Ajduković	177	Round-robin
France	Chloé Paquet	156	Richard Gasquet (Note: Gasquet replaced Arthur Fils on 1 July 2025 after Fils withdrew.)	182	Round-robin
Greece	Despina Papamichail	267	Stefanos Tsitsipas	27	Round-robin
Italy	Lucia Bronzetti (Note: Bronzetti replaced Jasmine Paolini in July 2025 after Paolini withdrew.)	64	Flavio Cobolli	19	Runner-up
Spain	Marina Bassols Ribera	236	Roberto Bautista Agut	54	Round-robin
^{1} – ATP and WTA rankings as of 14 July 2025 (latest before the tournament)

== Group stage ==
The 6 teams were divided into two groups of three teams each in a round-robin format. The winners of each group will qualify for the final.

=== Group A ===
==== Standings ====
Team		Canada	Greece	Spain	RR W–L	Matches W–L	Sets W–L	Games W–L	Standings
A	Canada		3–0	3–0	2–0	6–0	10–0	62–29	1
B	Greece	0–3		1–2	0–2	1–5	3–9	42–61	3
C	Spain	0–3	2–1		1–1	2–4	4–8	43–57	2

All times are local (UTC+1).

==== Greece vs. Spain ====
Greece
1
Fiera del Levante, Bari
17 July 2025, 17:30
Hard

Spain
2

			1	2	3
1	(Greece) (Spain)	Despina Papamichail; Marina Bassols Ribera	0; 6	4; 6
2	(Greece) (Spain)	Stefanos Tsitsipas; Roberto Bautista Agut	3; 6	7^{8} 6^{6}	[8] [10]
3	(Greece) (Spain)	Stefanos Tsitsipas / Despina Papamichail; Roberto Bautista Agut / Marina Bassols Ribera	6; 2	6; 3

==== Canada vs. Spain ====
Canada
3
Fiera del Levante, Bari
18 July 2025, 17:00
Hard

Spain
0

			1	2	3
1	(Canada) (Spain)	Bianca Andreescu; Marina Bassols Ribera	6; 0	6; 1
2	(Canada) (Spain)	Félix Auger-Aliassime; Roberto Bautista Agut	6; 3	7^{7} 6^{3}
3	(Canada) (Spain)	Félix Auger-Aliassime / Bianca Andreescu; Roberto Bautista Agut / Marina Bassols Ribera	6; 3			retired

==== Greece vs. Canada ====
Greece
0
Fiera del Levante, Bari
19 July 2025, 17:30
Hard

Canada
3

			1	2	3
1	(Greece) (Canada)	Despina Papamichail; Bianca Andreescu	1; 6	2; 6
2	(Greece) (Canada)	Stefanos Tsitsipas; Félix Auger-Aliassime	6^{4} 7^{7}	3; 6
3	(Greece) (Canada)	Stefanos Tsitsipas / Despina Papamichail; Félix Auger-Aliassime / Bianca Andreescu	4; 6			retired

=== Group B ===
==== Standings ====
Team		Croatia	France	Italy	RR W–L	Matches W–L	Sets W–L	Games W–L	Standings
A	Croatia		1–2	1–2	0–2	2–4	7–9	49–61	3
B	France	2–1		1–2	1–1	3–3	8–5	59–52	2
C	Italy	2–1	2–1		2–0	4–2	9–6	63–59	1

All times are local (UTC+1).

==== Italy vs. Croatia ====
Italy
2
Fiera del Levante, Bari
16 July 2025, 17:30
Hard

Croatia
1

			1	2	3
1	(Italy) (Croatia)	Lucia Bronzetti; Donna Vekić	6; 3	4; 6	10; 1
2	(Italy) (Croatia)	Flavio Cobolli; Duje Ajduković	6^{1} 7^{7}	6; 4	10; 6
3	(Italy) (Croatia)	Flavio Cobolli / Lucia Bronzetti; Duje Ajduković / Donna Vekić	4; 6	6; 2	[8] [10]

==== France vs. Croatia ====
France
2
Fiera del Levante, Bari
17 July 2025, 17:00
Hard

Croatia
1

			1	2	3
1	(France) (Croatia)	Chloé Paquet; Donna Vekić	3; 6	3; 6
2	(France) (Croatia)	Richard Gasquet; Duje Ajduković	5; 7	6; 2	10; 6
3	(France) (Croatia)	Richard Gasquet / Chloé Paquet; Duje Ajduković / Donna Vekić				w/o

==== Italy vs. France ====
Italy
2
Fiera del Levante, Bari
18 July 2025, 17:30
Hard

France
1

			1	2	3
1	(Italy) (France)	Lucia Bronzetti; Chloé Paquet	6; 4	6^{5} 7^{7}	10; 8
2	(Italy) (France)	Flavio Cobolli; Richard Gasquet	6; 2	6; 4
3	(Italy) (France)	Flavio Cobolli / Lucia Bronzetti; Richard Gasquet / Chloé Paquet	4; 6			retired

== Final ==
=== Canada vs. Italy ===
Canada
2
Fiera del Levante, Bari
20 July 2025, 17:30
Hard

Italy
1

			1	2	3
1	(Canada) (Italy)	Bianca Andreescu; Lucia Bronzetti	6; 2	6; 3
2	(Canada) (Italy)	Félix Auger-Aliassime; Flavio Cobolli	7^{9} 6^{7}	5; 7	8; 10
3	(Canada) (Italy)	Félix Auger-Aliassime / Bianca Andreescu; Flavio Cobolli / Lucia Bronzetti	6; 3	6; 3

2025 Hopman Cup Champions
(Canada)
Canada
First title
