= 2007 Hopman Cup =

- Date: 30 December 2006 – 5 January 2007
- Edition: XIX
- Surface: Hard (indoor)
- Location: Perth, Western Australia
- Venue: Burswood Entertainment Complex

Champions
- Russia
← 2006 ·	Hopman Cup	· 2008 →

The 2007 Hopman Cup (also known as the Hyundai Hopman Cup for sponsorship reasons) is the 19th edition of the Hopman Cup tournament between nations in men's and women's tennis. Eight teams participated in the World Group, with one qualifier from the Asian region. The first matches were held on 30 December 2006, and the final took place on 5 January 2007 at the Burswood Entertainment Complex, Perth, Western Australia.

== Teams ==
=== Seeds ===
1. Russia – Nadia Petrova and Dmitry Tursunov (champions)
2. Spain – Anabel Medina Garrigues and Tommy Robredo (finalists)
3. Czech Republic – Lucie Šafářová and Tomáš Berdych
4. United States – Ashley Harkleroad and Mardy Fish

=== Unseeded ===
- Australia – Alicia Molik and Mark Philippoussis^{1}
- Croatia – Sanja Ančić and Mario Ančić
- France – Tatiana Golovin and Jérôme Haehnel
- India – Sania Mirza and Rohan Bopanna

^{1}Due to injury Mark Philippoussis was unable to play Australia's last tie against the USA. He was replaced by Nathan Healey.

== Group A ==
=== Standings ===
Pos.	Country	W	L	Matches	Sets
1.	Russia	2	1	6 – 3	13 – 6
2.	France	2	1	5 – 4	10 – 10
3.	Australia	2	1	4 – 5	8 – 12
4.	United States	0	3	3 – 6	9 – 12

=== Australia vs. Russia ===
Australia
2
Burswood Entertainment Complex, Perth
30 December 2006, 10:00 AWST (UTC+8)
hard (indoors)

Russia
1

			1	2	3
1	(Australia) (Russia)	Alicia Molik; Nadia Petrova	6; 2	2; 6	6; 2
2	(Australia) (Russia)	Mark Philippoussis; Dmitry Tursunov	6; 4	7^{7} 6^{0}
3	(Australia) (Russia)	Alicia Molik / Mark Philippoussis; Nadia Petrova / Dmitry Tursunov	6^{6} 7^{8}	1; 6

=== France vs. United States ===
France
2
Burswood Entertainment Complex, Perth
30 December 2006, 17:30 AWST (UTC+8)
hard (indoors)

United States
1

			1	2	3
1	(France) (United States)	Tatiana Golovin; Ashley Harkleroad	6; 3	4; 6	6; 2
2	(France) (United States)	Jérôme Haehnel; Mardy Fish	7; 5	4; 6	7^{7} 6^{4}
3	(France) (United States)	Tatiana Golovin / Jérôme Haehnel; Ashley Harkleroad / Mardy Fish				w/o

=== Russia vs. United States ===
Russia
2
Burswood Entertainment Complex, Perth
2 January 2007, 10:00 AWST (UTC+8)
hard (indoors)

United States
1

			1	2	3
1	(Russia) (United States)	Nadia Petrova; Ashley Harkleroad	6; 3	6; 0
2	(Russia) (United States)	Dmitry Tursunov; Mardy Fish	1; 6	4; 6
3	(Russia) (United States)	Nadia Petrova / Dmitry Tursunov; Ashley Harkleroad / Mardy Fish	6; 3	7; 5

=== France vs. Australia ===
France
3
Burswood Entertainment Complex, Perth
2 January 2007, 17:30 AWST (UTC+8)
hard (indoors)

Australia
0

			1	2	3
1	(France) (Australia)	Tatiana Golovin; Alicia Molik	7; 5	6; 2
2	(France) (Australia)	Jérôme Haehnel; Mark Philippoussis	4; 1			retired
3	(France) (Australia)	Tatiana Golovin / Jérôme Haehnel; Alicia Molik / Mark Philippoussis				w/o

=== France vs. Russia ===
France
0
Burswood Entertainment Complex, Perth
4 January 2007, 10:00 AWST (UTC+8)
hard (indoors)

Russia
3

			1	2	3
1	(France) (Russia)	Tatiana Golovin; Nadia Petrova	6^{2} 7^{7}	0; 6
2	(France) (Russia)	Jérôme Haehnel; Dmitry Tursunov	1; 6	4; 6
3	(France) (Russia)	Tatiana Golovin / Jérôme Haehnel; Nadia Petrova / Dmitry Tursunov	4; 6	2; 6

=== Australia vs. United States ===
Australia
2
Burswood Entertainment Complex, Perth
4 January 2007, 10:00 AWST (UTC+8)
hard (indoors)

United States
1

			1	2	3
1	(Australia) (United States)	Alicia Molik; Ashley Harkleroad	3; 6	6; 4	6; 4
2	(Australia) (United States)	Nathan Healey; Mardy Fish	5; 7	5; 7
3	(Australia) (United States)	Alicia Molik / Nathan Healey; Ashley Harkleroad / Mardy Fish	6; 4	7; 5

== Group B ==
=== Standings ===
Pos.	Country	W	L	Matches	Sets
1.	Spain	2	1	6 – 3	14 – 8
2.	India	2	1	5 – 4	11 – 11
3.	Czech Republic	1	2	4 – 5	9 – 11
4.	Croatia	1	2	3 – 6	8 – 12

=== India vs. Czech Republic ===
India
2
Burswood Entertainment Complex, Perth
31 December 2006, 10:00 AWST (UTC+8)
hard (indoors)

Czech Republic
1

			1	2	3
1	(India) (Czech Republic)	Sania Mirza; Lucie Šafářová	6; 2	6; 2
2	(India) (Czech Republic)	Rohan Bopanna; Tomáš Berdych	2; 6	2; 6
3	(India) (Czech Republic)	Sania Mirza / Rohan Bopanna; Lucie Šafářová / Tomáš Berdych	6; 3	5; 7	7^{7} 6^{5}

=== Spain vs. Croatia ===
Spain
3
Burswood Entertainment Complex, Perth
1 January 2007, 10:00 AWST (UTC+8)
hard (indoors)

Croatia
0

			1	2	3
1	(Spain) (Croatia)	Anabel Medina Garrigues; Sanja Ančić	6; 3	6; 1
2	(Spain) (Croatia)	Tommy Robredo; Mario Ančić	3; 6	7; 5	6; 3
3	(Spain) (Croatia)	Anabel Medina Garrigues / Tommy Robredo; Sanja Ančić / Mario Ančić	6; 4	6; 2

=== Spain vs. Czech Republic ===
Spain
1
Burswood Entertainment Complex, Perth
3 January 2007, 10:00 AWST (UTC+8)
hard (indoors)

Czech Republic
2

			1	2	3
1	(Spain) (Czech Republic)	Anabel Medina Garrigues; Lucie Šafářová	6; 4	4; 6	4; 6
2	(Spain) (Czech Republic)	Tommy Robredo; Tomáš Berdych	5; 7	1; 6
3	(Spain) (Czech Republic)	Anabel Medina Garrigues / Tommy Robredo; Lucie Šafářová / Tomáš Berdych	7; 5	6; 2

=== Croatia vs. India ===
Croatia
1
Burswood Entertainment Complex, Perth
3 January 2007, 17:30 AWST (UTC+8)
hard (indoors)

India
2

			1	2	3
1	(Croatia) (India)	Sanja Ančić; Sania Mirza	2; 6	3; 6
2	(Croatia) (India)	Mario Ančić; Rohan Bopanna	7^{7} 6^{2}	7^{7} 6^{4}
3	(Croatia) (India)	Sanja Ančić / Mario Ančić; Sania Mirza / Rohan Bopanna	6; 3	3; 6	6^{9} 7^{11}

=== Spain vs. India ===
Spain
2
Burswood Entertainment Complex, Perth
4 January 2007, 17:30 AWST (UTC+8)
hard (indoors)

India
1

			1	2	3
1	(Spain) (India)	Anabel Medina Garrigues; Sania Mirza	3; 6	6; 1	6; 3
2	(Spain) (India)	Tommy Robredo; Rohan Bopanna	6; 2	6; 3
3	(Spain) (India)	Anabel Medina Garrigues / Tommy Robredo; Sania Mirza / Rohan Bopanna	7^{7} 6^{5}	2; 6	6^{9} 7^{11}

=== Czech Republic vs. Croatia ===
Czech Republic
1
Burswood Entertainment Complex, Perth
4 January 2007, 17:30 AWST (UTC+8)
hard (indoors)

Croatia
2

			1	2	3
1	(Czech Republic) (Croatia)	Lucie Šafářová; Sanja Ančić	6; 4	6; 3
2	(Czech Republic) (Croatia)	Tomáš Berdych; Mario Ančić	6^{2} 7^{7}	4; 6
3	(Czech Republic) (Croatia)	Lucie Šafářová / Tomáš Berdych; Sanja Ančić / Mario Ančić				w/o

== Final ==
=== Russia vs. Spain ===
Russia
2
Burswood Entertainment Complex, Perth
5 January 2007, 17:00 AWST UTC+8
hard (indoors)

Spain
0

			1	2	3
1	(Russia) (Spain)	Nadia Petrova; Anabel Medina Garrigues	6; 0	6; 4
2	(Russia) (Spain)	Dmitry Tursunov; Tommy Robredo	6; 4	7; 5
3	(Russia) (Spain)	Nadia Petrova / Dmitry Tursunov; Anabel Medina Garrigues / Tommy Robredo				not played

2007 Hopman Cup Champions
(Russia)
Russia
First title
