= China at the Hopman Cup =

Sporting event delegation

China
- First year: 2006
- Years played: 2
- Best finish: 4th in group (2012)
- Most total wins: Li Na (3–3)
- Most singles wins: Li Na (3–0)
- Most doubles wins: Li Na (0–3); Peng Shuai (0–1); Sun Peng (0–1); Wu Di (0–3)
- Best doubles team: Peng Shuai & Sun Peng (0–1)
- Most years played: Li Na (1); Peng Shuai (1); Sun Peng (1); Wu Di (1)

China is a nation that has competed at the Hopman Cup tournament on two occasions, their debut coming at the 18th annual staging of the tournament in 2006, when they lost to the Netherlands in the qualification play-off.

China also participated a number of times in the now defunct Asian Hopman Cup, a qualifying tournament which ran from 2006 until 2009 and granted the winners entry into the Hopman Cup the following year. China participated every year and each time failed to progress past the round robin stage of the event

== Players ==
This is a list of players who have played for China in the Hopman Cup.

Name	Total W–L	Singles W–L	Doubles W–L	First year played	No. of years played
Li Na	3–3	3–0	0–3	2012	1
Peng Shuai	1–1	1–0	0–1	2006	1
Sun Peng	0–2	0–1	0–1	2006	1
Wu Di	0–6	0–3	0–3	2012	1

== Results ==
Year	Competition	Location	Opponent	Score	Result
2006	Qualification Play-off	Burswood Dome, Perth	Netherlands	1–2	Lost
2012	Round Robin	Burswood Dome, Perth	France	1–2	Lost
2012	Round Robin	Burswood Dome, Perth	Spain	1–2	Lost
2012	Round Robin	Burswood Dome, Perth	Australia	1–2	Lost
