= 2006 Hopman Cup =

- Date: 30 December 2005 – 6 January 2006
- Edition: XVIII
- Surface: Hard (indoor)
- Location: Perth, Western Australia
- Venue: Burswood Entertainment Complex

Champions
- United States
← 2005 ·	Hopman Cup	· 2007 →

The 2006 Hopman Cup (also known as the Hyundai Hopman Cup for sponsorship reasons) was the 18th Hopman Cup tournament. The champions were Lisa Raymond and Taylor Dent of the United States. The Netherlands qualified and reached the final. Michaëlla Krajicek won her singles match, and Taylor Dent beat Peter Wessels. The mixed doubles competition was won in close sets by Raymond and Dent. The event was held at the Burswood Entertainment Complex in Perth on 30 December 2005 through 6 January 2006. This was the first elite-level tennis tournament in which players could challenge line calls using the Hawk-Eye technology. Players or teams had a limit of two unsuccessful challenges per set.

== Teams ==
=== Seeds ===
1. United States – Lisa Raymond and Taylor Dent (champions)
2. Argentina – Gisela Dulko and Gastón Gaudio
3. Australia – Samantha Stosur and either Wayne Arthurs or Todd Reid
4. Russia – Svetlana Kuznetsova and Yuri Schukin

=== Unseeded ===
- China – Peng Shuai and Sun Peng
- Germany – Anna-Lena Grönefeld and Nicolas Kiefer
- Netherlands – Michaëlla Krajicek and Peter Wessels (finalists)
- Serbia and Montenegro – Ana Ivanovic and Novak Djokovic
- Sweden – Sofia Arvidsson and Thomas Johansson

== Play-off ==
=== Netherlands vs. China ===
Netherlands
2

China
1

			1	2	3
1	(Netherlands) (China)	Michaëlla Krajicek; Peng Shuai	3; 6	6; 4	3; 6
2	(Netherlands) (China)	Peter Wessels; Sun Peng	6; 2	6; 2
3	(Netherlands) (China)	Michaëlla Krajicek / Peter Wessels; Peng Shuai / Sun Peng	6; 4	6; 4

== Group A ==
=== Standings ===
Pos.	Country	W	L	Matches	Sets
1.	United States	2	1	5 – 4	12 – 8
2.	Serbia and Montenegro	2	1	5 – 4	10 – 8
3.	Sweden	1	2	4 – 5	8 – 12
4.	Russia	1	2	4 – 5	8 – 10

=== United States vs. Serbia and Montenegro ===
United States
2

Serbia and Montenegro
1

			1	2	3
1	(United States) (Serbia and Montenegro)	Lisa Raymond; Ana Ivanovic	2; 6	4; 6
2	(United States) (Serbia and Montenegro)	Taylor Dent; Novak Djokovic	6; 1	6; 4
3	(United States) (Serbia and Montenegro)	Lisa Raymond / Taylor Dent; Ana Ivanovic / Novak Djokovic	7; 6	6; 2

=== Serbia and Montenegro vs. Sweden ===
Serbia and Montenegro
2

Sweden
1

			1	2	3
1	(Serbia and Montenegro) (Sweden)	Ana Ivanovic; Sofia Arvidsson	6; 3	6; 1
2	(Serbia and Montenegro) (Sweden)	Novak Djokovic; Thomas Johansson	6^{5} 7^{7}	6^{4} 7^{7}
3	(Serbia and Montenegro) (Sweden)	Ana Ivanovic / Novak Djokovic; Sofia Arvidsson / Thomas Johansson	6; 2	6; 4

=== United States vs. Russia ===
United States
2

Russia
1

			1	2	3
1	(United States) (Russia)	Lisa Raymond; Svetlana Kuznetsova	4; 6	1; 6
2	(United States) (Russia)	Taylor Dent; Yuri Schukin	6; 2	6; 0
3	(United States) (Russia)	Lisa Raymond / Taylor Dent; Svetlana Kuznetsova / Yuri Schukin	6; 4	6; 1

=== Russia vs. Sweden ===
Russia
2

Sweden
1

			1	2	3
1	(Russia) (Sweden)	Svetlana Kuznetsova; Sofia Arvidsson	7^{7} 6^{4}	6; 4
2	(Russia) (Sweden)	Yuri Schukin; Thomas Johansson	6^{8} 7^{10}	6^{5} 7^{7}
3	(Russia) (Sweden)	Svetlana Kuznetsova / Yuri Schukin; Sofia Arvidsson / Thomas Johansson	7; 5	6; 3

=== Serbia and Montenegro vs. Russia ===
Serbia and Montenegro
2

Russia
1

			1	2	3
1	(Serbia and Montenegro) (Russia)	Ana Ivanovic; Svetlana Kuznetsova	1; 6	4; 6
2	(Serbia and Montenegro) (Russia)	Novak Djokovic; Yuri Schukin	6; 0	6; 2
3	(Serbia and Montenegro) (Russia)	Ana Ivanovic / Novak Djokovic; Svetlana Kuznetsova / Yuri Schukin	6; 2	7^{7} 6^{5}

=== Sweden vs. United States ===
Sweden
2

United States
1

			1	2	3
1	(Sweden) (United States)	Sofia Arvidsson; Lisa Raymond	2; 6	6; 2	6; 4
2	(Sweden) (United States)	Thomas Johansson; Taylor Dent	7^{7} 6^{5}	2; 6	6; 3
3	(Sweden) (United States)	Sofia Arvidsson / Thomas Johansson; Lisa Raymond / Taylor Dent				w/o

== Group B ==
=== Standings ===
Pos.	Country	W	L	Matches	Sets
1.	Netherlands	3	0	7 – 2	15 – 4
2.	Australia	1	2	4 – 5	9 – 11
3.	Argentina	1	2	4 – 5	9 – 11
4.	Germany	1	2	3 – 6	6 – 13

=== Germany vs. Australia ===
Germany
2

Australia
1

			1	2	3
1	(Germany) (Australia)	Anna-Lena Grönefeld; Samantha Stosur	3; 6	5; 7
2	(Germany) (Australia)	Nicolas Kiefer; Wayne Arthurs	6; 3	6; 4
3	(Germany) (Australia)	Anna-Lena Grönefeld / Nicolas Kiefer; Samantha Stosur / Wayne Arthurs	4; 6	6; 3	7^{11} 6^{9}

=== Netherlands vs. Argentina ===
Netherlands
2

Argentina
1

			1	2	3
1	(Netherlands) (Argentina)	Michaëlla Krajicek; Gisela Dulko	6; 4	6; 2
2	(Netherlands) (Argentina)	Peter Wessels; Gastón Gaudio	6; 2	7^{7} 6^{5}
3	(Netherlands) (Argentina)	Michaëlla Krajicek / Peter Wessels; Gisela Dulko / Gastón Gaudio	6; 4	3; 6	6^{5} 7^{7}

=== Netherlands vs. Australia ===
Netherlands
2

Australia
1

			1	2	3
1	(Netherlands) (Australia)	Michaëlla Krajicek; Samantha Stosur	6^{9} 7^{11}	4; 6
2	(Netherlands) (Australia)	Peter Wessels; Todd Reid	7; 5	6; 4
3	(Netherlands) (Australia)	Michaëlla Krajicek / Peter Wessels; Samantha Stosur / Todd Reid	6; 4	6; 2

=== Argentina vs. Germany ===
Argentina
2

Germany
1

			1	2	3
1	(Argentina) (Germany)	Gisela Dulko; Anna-Lena Grönefeld	6; 1	6; 0
2	(Argentina) (Germany)	Gastón Gaudio; Nicolas Kiefer	3; 6	3; 6
3	(Argentina) (Germany)	Gisela Dulko / Gastón Gaudio; Anna-Lena Grönefeld / Nicolas Kiefer	7; 5	6; 0

=== Australia vs. Argentina ===
Australia
2

Argentina
1

			1	2	3
1	(Australia) (Argentina)	Samantha Stosur; Gisela Dulko	7; 5	6^{4} 7^{7}	6; 3
2	(Australia) (Argentina)	Todd Reid; Gastón Gaudio	0; 6	3; 6
3	(Australia) (Argentina)	Samantha Stosur / Todd Reid; Gisela Dulko / Gastón Gaudio	7; 5	6; 3

=== Netherlands vs. Germany ===
Netherlands
3

Germany
0

			1	2	3
1	(Netherlands) (Germany)	Michaëlla Krajicek; Anna-Lena Grönefeld	6; 4	7^{7} 6^{5}
2	(Netherlands) (Germany)	Peter Wessels; Nicolas Kiefer				w/o
3	(Netherlands) (Germany)	Michaëlla Krajicek / Peter Wessels; Anna-Lena Grönefeld / Nicolas Kiefer				w/o

== Final ==
=== United States vs. Netherlands ===
United States
2
Burswood Entertainment Complex, Perth
6 January 2006
Hard (indoors)

Netherlands
1

			1	2	3
1	(United States) (Netherlands)	Lisa Raymond; Michaëlla Krajicek	4; 6	6^{5} 7^{7}
2	(United States) (Netherlands)	Taylor Dent; Peter Wessels	6; 1	6; 4
3	(United States) (Netherlands)	Lisa Raymond / Taylor Dent; Michaëlla Krajicek / Peter Wessels	4; 6	6; 2	7^{7} 6^{5}

2006 Hopman Cup Champions
(United States)
United States
Fourth title
