= 2005 Hopman Cup =

- Date: 1 January – 8 January 2005
- Edition: XVII
- Surface: Hard (indoor)
- Location: Perth, Western Australia
- Venue: Burswood Entertainment Complex

Champions
- Slovakia
← 2004 ·	Hopman Cup	· 2006 →

The 2005 Hopman Cup (also known as the Hyundai Hopman Cup for sponsorship reasons) was the 17th edition of the Hopman Cup. Slovakia's Daniela Hantuchová and Dominik Hrbatý of Slovakia were the champions, when they defeated Argentina in the final. It was Slovakia's second Hopman Cup win. The event took place at the Burswood Entertainment Complex in Perth from 1 January 2005 through 8 January 2005. The round robin event had one African nation that played in the main draw of this year's Hopman Cup: Zimbabwe, who lost 1–2 to The Netherlands.

== Play-off ==
=== Netherlands vs. Zimbabwe ===
Netherlands
2
Burswood Entertainment Complex, Perth
1 January 2005 – 8 January 2005

Zimbabwe
1

			1	2	3
1	(Netherlands) (Zimbabwe)	Michaëlla Krajicek; Cara Black	3; 6	7; 6	6; 0
2	(Netherlands) (Zimbabwe)	Peter Wessels; Wayne Black	7; 6	7; 5
3	(Netherlands) (Zimbabwe)	Michaëlla Krajicek / Peter Wessels; Cara Black / Wayne Black	7; 8

== Group A ==
=== Teams and standings ===
Teams and seeds of the 2005 Hopman Cup in Group A were:

- Argentina – Gisela Dulko and Guillermo Coria (Round robin win–loss: 3–0; match win–loss: 6–3)
- Germany – Anna-Lena Grönefeld and Tommy Haas (Round robin win–loss: 2–1; match win–loss: 5–4)
- Italy – Francesca Schiavone and Davide Sanguinetti (Round robin win–loss: 1–2; match win–loss: 4–5)
- Russia – Anastasia Myskina and Marat Safin (Round robin win–loss: 0–3; match win–loss: 3–6)

=== Argentina vs. Germany ===
Argentina
2
Burswood Entertainment Complex, Perth
1 January 2005 – 8 January 2005

Germany
1

			1	2	3
1	(Argentina) (Germany)	Gisela Dulko; Anna-Lena Grönefeld	6; 3	2; 6	1; 6
2	(Argentina) (Germany)	Guillermo Coria; Tommy Haas	5; 7	3; 2		retired
3	(Argentina) (Germany)	Gisela Dulko / Guillermo Coria; Anna-Lena Grönefeld / Tommy Haas				w/o

=== Argentina vs. Italy ===
Argentina
2
Burswood Entertainment Complex, Perth
1 January 2005 – 8 January 2005

Italy
1

			1	2	3
1	(Argentina) (Italy)	Gisela Dulko; Francesca Schiavone	1; 6	3; 6
2	(Argentina) (Italy)	Guillermo Coria; Davide Sanguinetti	6; 1	7; 6
3	(Argentina) (Italy)	Gisela Dulko / Guillermo Coria; Francesca Schiavone / Davide Sanguinetti	7; 5	6; 0

=== Argentina vs. Russia ===
Argentina
2
Burswood Entertainment Complex, Perth
1 January 2005 – 8 January 2005

Russia
1

			1	2	3
1	(Argentina) (Russia)	Gisela Dulko; Anastasia Myskina	2; 6	1; 6
2	(Argentina) (Russia)	Guillermo Coria; Marat Safin	7; 6	6; 1
3	(Argentina) (Russia)	Gisela Dulko / Guillermo Coria; Anastasia Myskina / Marat Safin	6; 2	6; 0

=== Germany vs. Italy ===
Germany
2
Burswood Entertainment Complex, Perth
1 January 2005 – 8 January 2005

Italy
1

			1	2	3
1	(Germany) (Italy)	Anna-Lena Grönefeld; Francesca Schiavone	2; 6	6; 2	2; 6
2	(Germany) (Italy)	Tommy Haas; Davide Sanguinetti	6; 3	6; 2
3	(Germany) (Italy)	Anna-Lena Grönefeld / Tommy Haas; Francesca Schiavone / Davide Sanguinetti	7; 6	6; 4

=== Germany vs. Russia ===
Germany
2
Burswood Entertainment Complex, Perth
1 January 2005 – 8 January 2005

Russia
1

			1	2	3
1	(Germany) (Russia)	Anna-Lena Grönefeld; Anastasia Myskina	3; 6	3; 6
2	(Germany) (Russia)	Tommy Haas; Marat Safin	6; 3	3; 6	6; 1
3	(Germany) (Russia)	Anna-Lena Grönefeld / Tommy Haas; Anastasia Myskina / Marat Safin	7; 5	1; 6	7; 6

=== Italy vs. Russia ===
Italy
2
Burswood Entertainment Complex, Perth
1 January 2005 – 8 January 2005

Russia
1

			1	2	3
1	(Italy) (Russia)	Francesca Schiavone; Anastasia Myskina	3; 6	2; 6
2	(Italy) (Russia)	Davide Sanguinetti; Marat Safin	7; 6	6; 7	6; 0
3	(Italy) (Russia)	Francesca Schiavone / Davide Sanguinetti; Anastasia Myskina / Marat Safin	8; 6

== Group B ==
=== Teams and standings ===
Teams of the 2005 Hopman Cup in Group B were:

- Australia – Alicia Molik and either Paul Baccanello or Mark Philippoussis (Round robin win–loss: 1–2; match win–loss: 4–5)
- Netherlands – Michaëlla Krajicek and Peter Wessels (round robin win–loss: 2–2; match win–loss: 6–6)
- Slovakia – Daniela Hantuchová and Dominik Hrbatý (round robin win–loss: 2–1; match win–loss: 6–3)
- United States – Meghann Shaughnessy and James Blake (Round robin win–loss: 2–1; match win–loss: 5–4)
- Zimbabwe – Cara Black and Wayne Black (Round robin win–loss: match win–loss: 1–2)

=== Australia vs. Slovakia ===
Australia
2
Burswood Entertainment Complex, Perth
1 January 2005 – 8 January 2005

Slovakia
1

			1	2	3
1	(Australia) (Slovakia)	Alicia Molik; Daniela Hantuchová	6; 3	6; 3
2	(Australia) (Slovakia)	Mark Philippoussis; Dominik Hrbatý	5; 7	2; 6
3	(Australia) (Slovakia)	Alicia Molik / Mark Philippoussis; Daniela Hantuchová / Dominik Hrbatý	6; 7	6; 3	7; 6

=== Netherlands vs. Australia ===
Netherlands
2
Burswood Entertainment Complex, Perth
1 January 2005 – 8 January 2005

Australia
1

			1	2	3
1	(Netherlands) (Australia)	Michaëlla Krajicek; Alicia Molik	3; 6	5; 7
2	(Netherlands) (Australia)	Peter Wessels; Mark Philippoussis	7; 6	3; 6	6; 2
3	(Netherlands) (Australia)	Michaëlla Krajicek / Peter Wessels; Alicia Molik / Mark Philippoussis				w/o

=== Slovakia vs. Netherlands ===
Slovakia
3
Burswood Entertainment Complex, Perth
1 January 2005 – 8 January 2005

Netherlands
0

			1	2	3
1	(Slovakia) (Netherlands)	Daniela Hantuchová; Michaëlla Krajicek	6; 4	6; 2
2	(Slovakia) (Netherlands)	Dominik Hrbatý; Peter Wessels	5; 2			retired
3	(Slovakia) (Netherlands)	Daniela Hantuchová / Dominik Hrbatý; Michaëlla Krajicek / Peter Wessels				w/o

=== Slovakia vs. United States ===
Slovakia
2
Burswood Entertainment Complex, Perth
1 January 2005 – 8 January 2005

United States
1

			1	2	3
1	(Slovakia) (United States)	Daniela Hantuchová; Meghann Shaughnessy	6; 4	6; 2
2	(Slovakia) (United States)	Dominik Hrbatý; James Blake	7; 6	6; 4
3	(Slovakia) (United States)	Daniela Hantuchová / Dominik Hrbatý; Meghann Shaughnessy / James Blake	6; 0	6; 7	6; 7

=== United States vs. Australia ===
United States
2
Burswood Entertainment Complex, Perth
1 January 2005 – 8 January 2005

Australia
1

			1	2	3
1	(United States) (Australia)	Meghann Shaughnessy; Alicia Molik	2; 6	3; 6
2	(United States) (Australia)	James Blake; Paul Baccanello	6; 3	6; 4
3	(United States) (Australia)	Meghann Shaughnessy / James Blake; Alicia Molik / Paul Baccanello	6; 7	7; 5	7; 6

=== United States vs. Netherlands ===
United States
2
Burswood Entertainment Complex, Perth
1 January 2005 – 8 January 2005

Netherlands
1

			1	2	3
1	(United States) (Netherlands)	Meghann Shaughnessy; Michaëlla Krajicek	7; 5	6; 4
2	(United States) (Netherlands)	James Blake; Peter Wessels	6; 1	7; 6
3	(United States) (Netherlands)	Meghann Shaughnessy / James Blake; Michaëlla Krajicek / Peter Wessels	5; 7	5; 7

== Final ==
=== Slovakia vs. Argentina ===
Slovakia
3
Burswood Entertainment Complex, Perth
1 January 2005 – 8 January 2005

Argentina
0

			1	2	3
1	(Slovakia) (Argentina)	Daniela Hantuchová; Gisela Dulko	1; 6	6; 4	6; 4
2	(Slovakia) (Argentina)	Dominik Hrbatý; Guillermo Coria	6; 4	6; 1
3	(Slovakia) (Argentina)	Daniela Hantuchová / Dominik Hrbatý; Gisela Dulko / Guillermo Coria				w/o

2005 Hopman Cup Champions
(Slovakia)
Slovakia
Second title
