= Greece at the Hopman Cup =

Sporting event delegation

Greece
- First year: 2002
- Years played: 3
- Best finish: Round Robin
- Most total wins: Maria Sakkari (4–2); Stefanos Tsitsipas (4–6)
- Most singles wins: Maria Sakkari (2–1)
- Most doubles wins: Stefanos Tsitsipas (3–2)
- Best doubles team: Maria Sakkari & Stefanos Tsitsipas (2–1)
- Most years played: Stefanos Tsitsipas (2)

Greece is a nation that has competed at the Hopman Cup tournament on three occasions, in 2002, when they lost to Italy in the qualification play-off and in the 2019 Hopman Cup where they narrowly lost in the group stage.

== Players ==
This is a list of players who have played for Greece in the Hopman Cup.

Name	Total W–L	Singles W–L	Doubles W–L	First year played	No. of years played
Eleni Daniilidou	0–2	0–1	0–1	2002	1
Vasilis Mazarakis	0–2	0–1	0–1	2002	1
Despina Papamichail	1–3	0–2	1–1	2025	1
Maria Sakkari	4–2	2–1	2–1	2019	1
Stefanos Tsitsipas	4–6	1–4	3–2	2019	2

== Results ==
Year	Competition	Location	Opponent	Score	Result
2002	Qualification Play-offs	Burswood Dome, Perth	Italy	0–3	Lost
2019	Round Robin	Perth Arena, Perth	Great Britain	1–2	Lost
2019	Round Robin	Perth Arena, Perth	United States	2–1	Won
2019	Round Robin	Perth Arena, Perth	Switzerland	2–1	Won
2025	Round Robin	Fiera del Levante, Bari	Spain	1–2	Lost
2025	Round Robin	Fiera del Levante, Bari	Canada	0–3	Lost
