= Netherlands at the Hopman Cup =

Sporting event delegation

Netherlands
- First year: 1990
- Years played: 8
- Runners-up: 1

Netherlands is a nation that has competed at the Hopman Cup tournament on eight occasions, their first appearance coming at the 2nd annual staging of the event in 1990. They have been runner-up in one tournament in 2006.

== Players ==
This is a list of players who have played for the Netherlands at the Hopman Cup.

Name	First year played	No. of years played
Manon Bollegraf	1991	1
Richard Krajicek	1992	2
Michaëlla Krajicek	2005	2
Tom Nijssen	1995	1
Miriam Oremans	1994	1
Michiel Schapers	1990	2
Brenda Schultz-McCarthy	1990	4
Jan Siemerink	1994	4
Peter Wessels	2005	2

== Results ==
Year	Round	Date	Location	Opponent	Surface	Score	Result
2005	Hopman Cup, Play-off	1 - 8 jan	Perth, (AUS)	Zimbabwe	Hard (i)	2-1	Win
2005	Hopman Cup, Group B	1 - 8 jan	Perth, (AUS)	Australia	Hard (i)	2-1	Win
2005	Hopman Cup, Group B	1 - 8 jan	Perth, (AUS)	Slovakia	Hard (i)	3-0	Lost
2005	Hopman Cup, Group B	1 - 8 jan	Perth, (AUS)	United States	Hard (i)	2-1	Lost
2006	Hopman Cup, Play-off	30 dec - 6 jan	Perth, (AUS)	China	Hard (i)	2-1	Win
2006	Hopman Cup, Group B	30 dec - 6 jan	Perth, (AUS)	Argentina	Hard (i)	2-1	Win
2006	Hopman Cup, Group B	30 dec - 6 jan	Perth, (AUS)	Australia	Hard (i)	2-1	Win
2006	Hopman Cup, Group B	30 dec - 6 jan	Perth, (AUS)	Germany	Hard (i)	3-0	Win
2006	Hopman Cup, Final	30 dec - 6 jan	Perth, (AUS)	United States	Hard (i)	2-1	Lost

== See also ==
- Hopman Cup
- Netherlands Fed Cup team
- Netherlands Davis Cup team
