= Argentina at the Hopman Cup =

Sporting event delegation

Argentina
- First year: 1995
- Years played: 5
- Runners-up: 1 (2005)
- Most total wins: Gisela Dulko (6–12)
- Most singles wins: Guillermo Coria (3–1)
- Most doubles wins: Gisela Dulko (4–4)
- Best doubles team: Gisela Dulko & Guillermo Coria (2–0)
- Most years played: Gisela Dulko (3)

Argentina is a nation that has competed at the Hopman Cup tournament on five occasions, the first being at the 7th annual staging in 1995. In 2005, Argentina were the tournament runners-up and this remains their best showing to date.

== Players ==
This is a list of players who have played for Argentina in the Hopman Cup.

Name	Total W–L	Singles W–L	Doubles W–L	First year played	No. of years played
Guillermo Coria	5–1	3–1	2–0	2005	1
Gisela Dulko	6–12	2–8	4–4	2005	3
Javier Frana	1–1	0–1	1–0	1995	1
Gastón Gaudio	3–3	1–2	2–1	2006	1
Inés Gorrochategui	1–1	0–1	1–0	1995	1
Paola Suárez	2–4	2–1	0–3	2002	1
Mariano Zabaleta	0–6	0–3	0–3	2002	1
Juan Ignacio Chela	1–5	1–2	0–3	2008	1

== Results ==
Year	Competition	Location	Opponent	Score	Result
1995	Round One	Burswood Dome, Perth	Austria	1–2	Lost
2002	Round Robin	Burswood Dome, Perth	Spain	0–3	Lost
2002	Round Robin	Burswood Dome, Perth	Australia	1–2	Lost
2002	Round Robin	Burswood Dome, Perth	Switzerland	1–2	Lost
2005 ^{1}	Round Robin	Burswood Dome, Perth	Italy	2–1	Won
2005 ^{1}	Round Robin	Burswood Dome, Perth	Russia	2–1	Won
2005 ^{1}	Round Robin	Burswood Dome, Perth	Germany	2–1	Won
2005 ^{1}	Final	Burswood Dome, Perth	Slovakia	0–3	Lost
2006	Round Robin	Burswood Dome, Perth	Netherlands	1–2	Lost
2006	Round Robin	Burswood Dome, Perth	Germany	2–1	Won
2006	Round Robin	Burswood Dome, Perth	Australia	1–2	Lost
2008	Round Robin	Burswood Dome, Perth	France	1–2	Lost
2008	Round Robin	Burswood Dome, Perth	Chinese Taipei	0–3	Lost
2008	Round Robin	Burswood Dome, Perth	Serbia	1–2	Lost

^{1} In the 2005 tie against Germany, German opponent Tommy Haas strained his thigh muscle whilst leading in the men's singles match. He was forced to retire from the match and was unable to compete in the mixed doubles, thus defaulting two points to Argentina. In the final against Slovakia, the Argentinian team chose not to compete in the mixed doubles dead rubber.
