= New Zealand at the Hopman Cup =

Sporting event delegation

New Zealand
- First year: 1990
- Years played: 1
- Best finish: Round One (1990)
- Most total wins: Belinda Cordwell (0–2); Kelly Evernden (0–2)
- Most singles wins: Belinda Cordwell (0–1); Kelly Evernden (0–1)
- Most doubles wins: Belinda Cordwell (0–1); Kelly Evernden (0–1)
- Best doubles team: Belinda Cordwell & Kelly Evernden (0–1)
- Most years played: Belinda Cordwell (1); Kelly Evernden (1)

New Zealand is a nation that has competed at the Hopman Cup tournament on one occasion, at the 2nd annual staging of the tournament in 1990, when they lost to Austria in the first round.

== Players ==
This is a list of players who have played for New Zealand in the Hopman Cup.

Name	Total W–L	Singles W–L	Doubles W–L	First year played	No. of years played
Belinda Cordwell	0–2	0–1	0–1	1990	1
Kelly Evernden	0–2	0–1	0–1	1990	1

== Results ==
Year	Competition	Location	Opponent	Score	Result
1990	Round One	Burswood Dome, Perth	Austria	0–3	Lost
