= 1989 Hopman Cup =

- Date: 28 December 1988 – 1 January 1989
- Edition: 1st
- Surface: Hard indoor
- Location: Perth, Western Australia
- Venue: Burswood Entertainment Complex

Champions
- Czechoslovakia
Hopman Cup	· 1990 →

The 1989 Hopman Cup was the first edition to the Hopman Cup tennis event located at the Burswood Entertainment Complex in Perth, Western Australia. The event was held from 28 December 1988 through 1 January 1989. Miloslav Mečíř and Helena Suková of Czechoslovakia beat the Australian team of Hana Mandlíková and Pat Cash.

== Teams ==
=== Seeds ===
1. Czechoslovakia – Helena Suková and Miloslav Mečíř (champions)
2. Australia – Pat Cash and Hana Mandlíková (finalists)
3. West Germany – Steffi Graf and Patrik Kühnen (semifinalists)
4. Sweden – Catarina Lindqvist and Mikael Pernfors (semifinalists)

=== Unseeded ===
- France – Pascale Paradis and Thierry Tulasne (first round)
- United Kingdom – Sarah Loosemore and Jeremy Bates (first round)
- Japan – Masako Yanagi and Shuzo Matsuoka (first round)
- Yugoslavia – Karmen Škulj and Slobodan Živojinović (first round)

== Draw ==
First Round
1	Czechoslovakia	2
Japan	1
Yugoslavia	0
4	Sweden	3
3	West Germany	3
France	0
United Kingdom	1
2	Australia	2

Semifinals
1	Czechoslovakia	2
4	Sweden	1
3	West Germany	1
2	Australia	2

Final
1	Czechoslovakia	2
2	Australia	0

== Quarterfinals ==
=== Czechoslovakia vs. Japan ===
Czechoslovakia
2
Burswood Entertainment Complex, Perth
28 December 1988 – 1 January 1989
Hard (indoors)

Japan
1

			1	2	3
1	(Czechoslovakia) (Japan)	Helena Suková; Masako Yanagi	7; 5	6; 3
2	(Czechoslovakia) (Japan)	Miloslav Mečíř; Shuzo Matsuoka	2; 6	4; 6
3	(Czechoslovakia) (Japan)	Helena Suková / Miloslav Mečíř; Masako Yanagi / Shuzo Matsuoka	7; 5	6; 3

=== Sweden vs. Yugoslavia ===
Sweden
3
Burswood Entertainment Complex, Perth
28 December 1988 – 1 January 1989
Hard (indoors)

Yugoslavia
0

			1	2	3
1	(Sweden) (Socialist Federal Republic of Yugoslavia)	Mikael Pernfors; Slobodan Živojinović	6; 4	6; 3
2	(Sweden) (Socialist Federal Republic of Yugoslavia)	Catarina Lindqvist; Karmen Škulj	6; 2	6; 3
3	(Sweden) (Socialist Federal Republic of Yugoslavia)	Catarina Lindqvist / Mikael Pernfors; Karmen Škulj / Slobodan Živojinović	6; 7	6; 3	6; 2

=== West Germany vs. France ===
West Germany
3
Burswood Entertainment Complex, Perth
28 December 1988 – 1 January 1989
Hard (indoors)

France
0

			1	2	3
1	(West Germany) (France)	Steffi Graf; Pascale Paradis	6; 1	6; 2
2	(West Germany) (France)	Patrik Kühnen; Thierry Tulasne	7; 6	7; 5
3	(West Germany) (France)	Steffi Graf / Patrik Kühnen; Pascale Paradis / Thierry Tulasne	7; 6	7; 5

=== Australia vs. Great Britain ===
Australia
2
Burswood Entertainment Complex, Perth
28 December 1988 – 1 January 1989
Hard (indoors)

Great Britain
1

			1	2	3
1	(Australia) (United Kingdom)	Pat Cash; Jeremy Bates	6; 4	1; 6	6; 3
2	(Australia) (United Kingdom)	Hana Mandlíková; Sarah Loosemore	1; 6	2; 6
3	(Australia) (United Kingdom)	Hana Mandlíková / Pat Cash; Sarah Loosemore / Jeremy Bates	6; 4	7; 5

== Semifinals ==
=== Czechoslovakia vs. Sweden ===
Czechoslovakia
2
Burswood Entertainment Complex, Perth
28 December 1988 – 1 January 1989
Hard (indoors)

Sweden
1

			1	2	3
1	(Czechoslovakia) (Sweden)	Miloslav Mečíř; Mikael Pernfors	3; 6	2; 6
2	(Czechoslovakia) (Sweden)	Helena Suková; Catarina Lindqvist	6; 3	6; 2
3	(Czechoslovakia) (Sweden)	Helena Suková / Miloslav Mečíř; Catarina Lindqvist / Mikael Pernfors	6; 3	7; 5

=== Australia vs. Germany ===
Australia
2
Burswood Entertainment Complex, Perth
28 December 1988 – 1 January 1989
Hard (indoors)

Germany
1

			1	2	3
1	(Australia) (Germany)	Hana Mandlíková; Steffi Graf	0; 6	1; 6
2	(Australia) (Germany)	Pat Cash; Patrik Kühnen	6; 3	7; 6
3	(Australia) (Germany)	Hana Mandlíková / Pat Cash; Steffi Graf / Patrik Kühnen	6; 4	6; 2

== Final ==
=== Czechoslovakia vs. Australia ===
Czechoslovakia
2
Burswood Entertainment Complex, Perth
28 December 1988 – 1 January 1989
Hard (indoors)

Australia
0

			1	2	3
1	(Czechoslovakia) (Australia)	Helena Suková; Hana Mandlíková	6; 4	6; 3
2	(Czechoslovakia) (Australia)	Miloslav Mečíř; Pat Cash				not played
3	(Czechoslovakia) (Australia)	Helena Suková / Miloslav Mečíř; Hana Mandlíková / Pat Cash	6; 2	6; 4

1989 Hopman Cup Champions
(Czechoslovakia)
Czechoslovakia
First title
