= 2023 Hopman Cup =

- Date: 19 – 23 July
- Edition: XXXII (32nd)
- Surface: Clay
- Location: Nice, France
- Venue: Nice Lawn Tennis Club

Champions
- Croatia
- Hopman Cup

The Hopman Cup XXXII was the 32nd edition of the Hopman Cup, a tennis tournament between nations in men's and women's tennis. It took place from 19 to 23 July 2023 on clay courts at the Nice Lawn Tennis Club in Nice, France.

After a three-year absence, on 6 December 2022, the International Tennis Federation (ITF) announced that the Hopman Cup would return for the 2023 tennis season in Nice in July, the first occasion in which the event was moved out of Australia and away from the opening week of the season. The 2023 event featured six teams, as opposed to the eight featured in previous editions.

Team Croatia's Donna Vekić and Borna Ćorić defeated Switzerland's Céline Naef and Leandro Riedi in the final to win the second Hopman Cup title for Croatia, its first since 1996. Team Switzerland, the two-time defending champions, was contending to win a third consecutive Hopman Cup title.

== Entrants ==
The full list of 12 players who would compete in the Hopman Cup 2023 was unveiled on 4 April 2023:

Team	Female player	WTA^{1}	Male player	ATP^{1}	Elimination
Belgium	Elise Mertens	30	David Goffin	111	Round-robin
Croatia	Donna Vekić	22	Borna Ćorić	15	Champions
Denmark	Clara Tauson	89	Holger Rune	6	Round-robin
Spain	Rebeka Masarova (Note: Masarova replaced Paula Badosa on 13 July 2023 after Badosa withdrew.)	72	Carlos Alcaraz	1	Round-robin
France	Alizé Cornet	68	Richard Gasquet	49	Round-robin
Switzerland	Céline Naef (Note: Naef replaced Belinda Bencic on 16 July 2023 after Bencic withdrew due to a shoulder injury.)	157	Leandro Riedi	160	Runner-up
^{1} – ATP and WTA rankings as of 17 July 2023 (latest before the tournament)

== Group stage ==
The schedule was announced on 11 May 2023. The 6 teams were divided into two groups of three teams each in a round-robin format. The winners of each group will qualify for the final.

=== Group 1 ===
==== Standings ====
Team		Denmark	Switzerland	France	RR W–L	Matches W–L	Sets W–L	Games W–L	Standings
A	Denmark		1–2	1–2	0–2	2–4	4–8	53–64	3
B	Switzerland	2–1		2–1	2–0	4–2	9–5	62–53	1
C	France	2–1	1–2		1–1	3–3	7–7	60–58	2

All times are local (UTC+1).

==== Denmark vs. Switzerland ====
Denmark
1
Nice Lawn Tennis Club, Nice
19 July 2023, 16:00
Clay

Switzerland
2

			1	2	3
1	(Denmark) (Switzerland)	Clara Tauson; Céline Naef	6; 2	6; 3
2	(Denmark) (Switzerland)	Holger Rune; Leandro Riedi	4; 6	3; 6
3	(Denmark) (Switzerland)	Holger Rune / Clara Tauson; Leandro Riedi / Céline Naef	3; 6	5; 7

==== Denmark vs. France ====
Denmark
1
Nice Lawn Tennis Club, Nice
20 July 2023, 16:00
Clay

France
2

			1	2	3
1	(Denmark) (France)	Clara Tauson; Alizé Cornet	7^{7} 6^{2}	6; 4
2	(Denmark) (France)	Holger Rune; Richard Gasquet	2; 6	3; 6
3	(Denmark) (France)	Holger Rune / Clara Tauson; Richard Gasquet / Alizé Cornet	4; 6	4; 6

==== Switzerland vs. France ====
Switzerland
2
Nice Lawn Tennis Club, Nice
21 July 2023, 15:00
Clay

France
1

			1	2	3
1	(Switzerland) (France)	Céline Naef; Alizé Cornet	6; 1	3; 6	8; 10
2	(Switzerland) (France)	Leandro Riedi; Richard Gasquet	3; 6	6; 3	10; 8
3	(Switzerland) (France)	Leandro Riedi / Céline Naef; Richard Gasquet / Alizé Cornet	6; 4	7; 5

=== Group 2 ===
==== Standings ====
Team		Spain	Belgium	Croatia	RR W–L	Matches W–L	Sets W–L	Games W–L	Standings
D	Spain		1–2	1–2	0–2	2–4	6–10	53–62	3
E	Belgium	2–1		1–2	1–1	3–3	9–7	65–51	2
F	Croatia	2–1	2–1		2–0	4–2	9–7	54–59	1

==== Belgium vs. Croatia ====
Belgium
1
Nice Lawn Tennis Club, Nice
20 July 2023, 15:00
Clay

Croatia
2

			1	2	3
1	(Belgium) (Croatia)	Elise Mertens; Donna Vekić	6; 2	6; 2
2	(Belgium) (Croatia)	David Goffin; Borna Ćorić	3; 6	6; 2	4; 10
3	(Belgium) (Croatia)	David Goffin / Elise Mertens; Borna Ćorić / Donna Vekić	6^{5} 7^{7}	6; 3	6; 10

==== Belgium vs. Spain ====
Belgium
2
Nice Lawn Tennis Club, Nice
21 July 2023, 16:00
Clay

Spain
1

			1	2	3
1	(Belgium) (Spain)	Elise Mertens; Rebeka Masarova	7^{7} 6^{3}	2; 6	10; 5
2	(Belgium) (Spain)	David Goffin; Carlos Alcaraz	6; 4	4; 6	8; 10
3	(Belgium) (Spain)	David Goffin / Elise Mertens; Carlos Alcaraz / Rebeka Masarova	6; 3	6; 1

==== Croatia vs. Spain ====
Croatia
2
Nice Lawn Tennis Club, Nice
22 July 2023, 16:00
Clay

Spain
1

			1	2	3
1	(Croatia) (Spain)	Donna Vekić; Rebeka Masarova	6; 2	6; 1
2	(Croatia) (Spain)	Borna Ćorić; Carlos Alcaraz	3; 6	7^{8} 6^{6}	5; 10
3	(Croatia) (Spain)	Borna Ćorić / Donna Vekić; Carlos Alcaraz / Rebeka Masarova	1; 6	6; 4	14; 12

== Final ==
=== Switzerland vs. Croatia ===
Switzerland
0
Nice Lawn Tennis Club, Nice
23 July 2023, 16:00
Clay

Croatia
2

			1	2	3
1	(Switzerland) (Croatia)	Céline Naef; Donna Vekić	3; 6	4; 6
2	(Switzerland) (Croatia)	Leandro Riedi; Borna Ćorić	1; 6	4; 6
3	(Switzerland) (Croatia)	Leandro Riedi / Céline Naef; Borna Ćorić / Donna Vekić				not played

2023 Hopman Cup Champions
(Croatia)
Croatia
Second title
