= Denmark at the Hopman Cup =

Sporting event delegation

Denmark
- First year: 2012
- Years played: 2
- Best finish: 3rd in group
- Most total wins: Caroline Wozniacki (3–2)
- Most singles wins: Clara Tauson (2–0); Caroline Wozniacki (2–1)
- Most doubles wins: Caroline Wozniacki (1–1); Frederik Nielsen (1–1)
- Best doubles team: Caroline Wozniacki & Frederik Nielsen (1–1)
- Most years played: Frederik Nielsen (1); Holger Rune (1); Clara Tauson (1); Caroline Wozniacki (1)

Denmark is a nation that has appeared at Hopman Cup in 2012.

In 2012 Caroline Wozniacki became the 24th world No. 1 player in history to compete at the tournament.

== Players ==
This is a list of players who have played for Denmark in the Hopman Cup.

Name	Total W–L	Singles W–L	Doubles W–L	First year played	No. of years played
Frederik Nielsen	1–4	0–3	1–1	2012	1
Holger Rune	0–4	0–2	0–2	2023	1
Clara Tauson	2–2	2–0	0–2	2023	1
Caroline Wozniacki	3–2	2–1	1–1	2012	1

== Results ==
Year	Competition	Location	Opponent	Score	Result
2012 ^{1}	Round Robin	Burswood Dome, Perth	United States	2–1	Won
2012 ^{1}	Round Robin	Burswood Dome, Perth	Bulgaria	1–2	Lost
2012 ^{1}	Round Robin	Burswood Dome, Perth	Czech Republic	0–2	Lost
2023	Round Robin	Nice Lawn Tennis Club, Nice	Switzerland	1–2	Lost
2023	Round Robin	Nice Lawn Tennis Club, Nice	France	1–2	Lost

^{1} In the final round robin tie in 2012 against the Czech Republic, the dead mixed doubles rubber was not played.
