= 2012 Hopman Cup =

- Date: 31 December 2011 – 7 January 2012
- Edition: XXIV
- Surface: Hard (indoor)
- Location: Perth, Western Australia
- Venue: Crown Perth

Champions
- Czech Republic
- Hopman Cup

The Hopman Cup XXIV (also known as the Hyundai Hopman Cup for sponsorship reasons) corresponds to the 24th edition of the Hopman Cup tournament between nations in men's and women's tennis. The tournament commenced on 31 December 2011 at the Burswood Dome in Perth, Western Australia.

Eight teams competed for the title, with two round robin groups of four, from which the top team of each group progressed to the final.

United States were the 2011 champions. In that tournament's final the United States of America team of Bethanie Mattek-Sands and John Isner defeated Belgium's Justine Henin and Ruben Bemelmans 2–1. This was the USA's sixth Hopman Cup title.

Czech Republic won their second title, defeating France in the final 2–0.

Hopman Cup XXIV Champions
Czech Republic

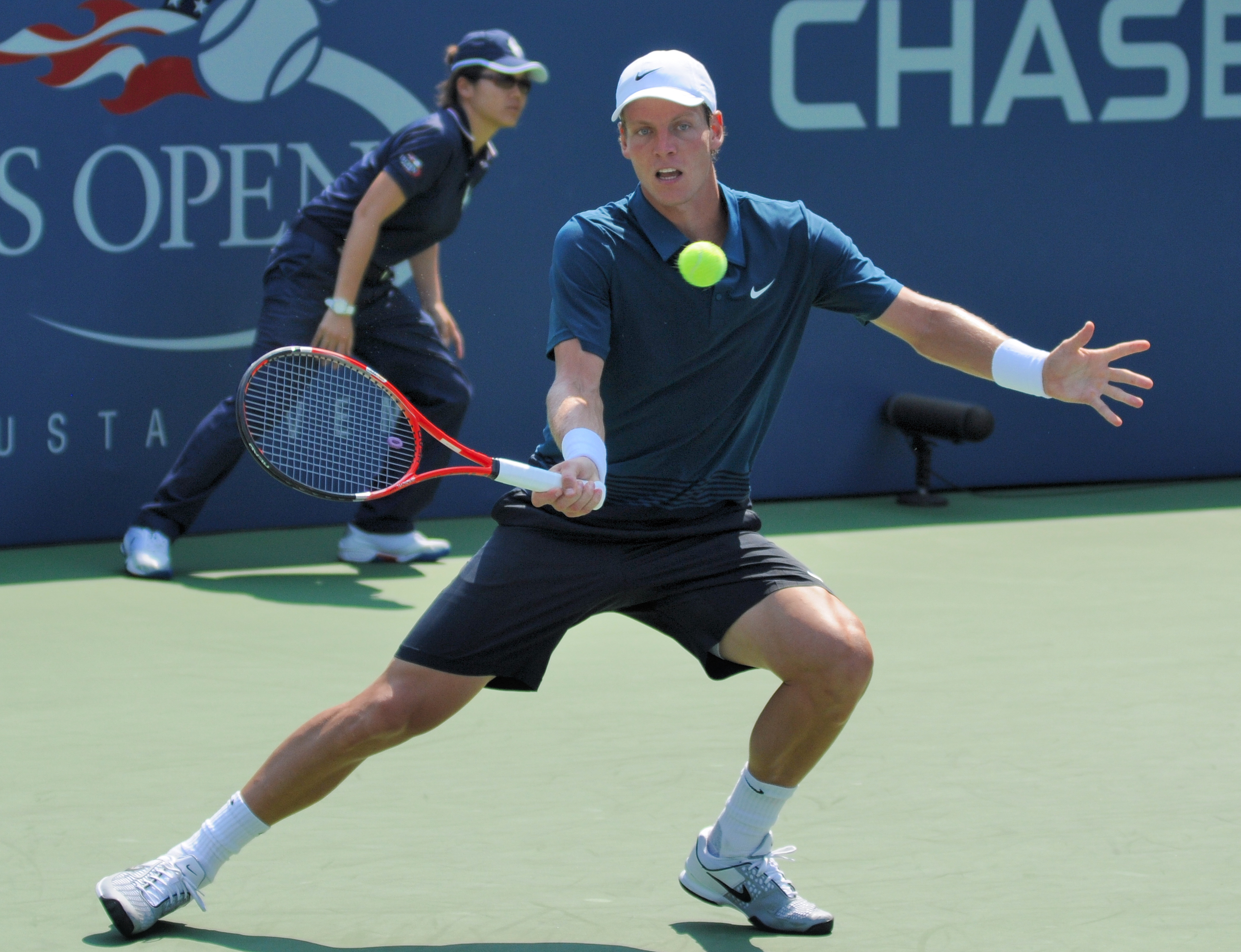
Tomáš Berdych

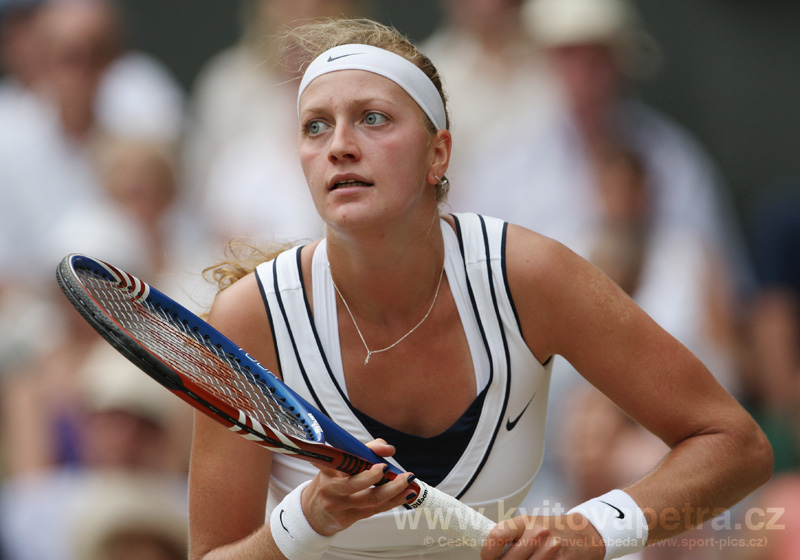
Petra Kvitová

== Tournament ==
The 2012 Hyundai Hopman Cup was an invitational tennis tournament and is also known as the Official Mixed Teams Championships of the ITF. The 2012 cup had prize money of $1 million and followed the traditional round robin format, the leading teams after three round robin matches qualified for the final. All matches were best of three sets with the exception of the doubles match where a match tie break, first to ten points, was played if the match was tied at one set all. All ties were played in this format; women's singles, men's singles and finally mixed doubles. In the event of a tie in the final group standings the following will be used to separate the nations;

- The highest total of matches won
- Best percentage of sets won and lost
- Best percentage of games won and lost
- Head-to-head performances
- Toss of a coin

== Entrants ==
=== Seeds ===
The seeds for the 2012 Hopman Cup were decided by tournament director Paul McNamee, Rob Casey and Geoff Masters.

1. Czech Republic – Petra Kvitová / Tomáš Berdych (champions)
2. France – Marion Bartoli / Richard Gasquet (finalists)
3. Spain – Anabel Medina Garrigues / Fernando Verdasco (round robin)
4. United States – Bethanie Mattek-Sands / Mardy Fish (round robin)

=== Other entrants ===
- Denmark – Caroline Wozniacki / Frederik Nielsen (round robin)
- Australia – Jarmila Gajdošová / Lleyton Hewitt (round robin)
- Bulgaria – Tsvetana Pironkova / Grigor Dimitrov (round robin)
- China – Li Na / Wu Di (round robin)

== Group stage ==
=== Group A ===
All times are local (UTC+8).

==== Standings ====
Pos.	Country	W	L	Matches	Sets	Games
1	Czech Republic	3	0	7–1	15–4	104–66
2	Bulgaria	2	1	5–4	11–10	93–92
3	Denmark	1	2	3–5	9–11	97–97
4	United States	0	3	2–7	4–14	70–107

==== Czech Republic vs. Bulgaria ====
Czech Republic
2
Crown Perth, Perth
2 January 2012, 09:30
Hard (indoors)

Bulgaria
1

			1	2	3
1	(Czech Republic) (Bulgaria)	Petra Kvitová; Tsvetana Pironkova	6; 4	6; 2
2	(Czech Republic) (Bulgaria)	Tomáš Berdych; Grigor Dimitrov	6; 4	6^{9} 7^{11}	6; 3
3	(Czech Republic) (Bulgaria)	Petra Kvitová / Tomáš Berdych; Tsvetana Pironkova / Grigor Dimitrov	6; 2	3; 6	9; 11

==== USA vs. Denmark ====
United States
1
Crown Perth, Perth
2 January 2012, 17:00
Hard (indoors)

Denmark
2

			1	2	3
1	(United States) (Denmark)	Mardy Fish; Frederik Nielsen	4; 6	7^{7} 6^{5}	6; 4
2	(United States) (Denmark)	Bethanie Mattek-Sands; Caroline Wozniacki	6^{4} 7^{7}	2; 6
3	(United States) (Denmark)	Bethanie Mattek-Sands / Mardy Fish; Caroline Wozniacki / Frederik Nielsen	5; 7	3; 6

==== Denmark vs. Bulgaria ====
Denmark
1
Crown Perth, Perth
4 January 2012, 09:30
Hard (indoors)

Bulgaria
2

			1	2	3
1	(Denmark) (Bulgaria)	Caroline Wozniacki; Tsvetana Pironkova	7; 5	4; 6	6; 2
2	(Denmark) (Bulgaria)	Frederik Nielsen; Grigor Dimitrov	6^{5} 7^{7}	2; 6
3	(Denmark) (Bulgaria)	Caroline Wozniacki / Frederik Nielsen; Tsvetana Pironkova / Grigor Dimitrov	6; 3	4; 6	1; 10

==== Czech Republic vs. USA ====
Czech Republic
3
Crown Perth, Perth
4 January 2012, 17:00
Hard (indoors)

United States
0

			1	2	3
1	(Czech Republic) (United States)	Petra Kvitová; Bethanie Mattek-Sands	6; 2	6; 1
2	(Czech Republic) (United States)	Tomáš Berdych; Mardy Fish	6; 3	6; 3
3	(Czech Republic) (United States)	Petra Kvitová / Tomáš Berdych; Bethanie Mattek-Sands / Mardy Fish	6; 3	7; 5

==== Czech Republic vs. Denmark ====
Czech Republic
2
Crown Perth, Perth
6 January 2012, 13:00
Hard (indoors)

Denmark
0

			1	2	3
1	(Czech Republic) (Denmark)	Petra Kvitová; Caroline Wozniacki	7^{7} 6^{4}	3; 6	6; 4
2	(Czech Republic) (Denmark)	Tomáš Berdych; Frederik Nielsen	6; 1	6; 3
3	(Czech Republic) (Denmark)	Petra Kvitová / Tomáš Berdych; Caroline Wozniacki / Frederik Nielsen				not played

==== USA vs. Bulgaria ====
United States
1
Crown Perth, Perth
6 January 2012, 17:00
Hard (indoors)

Bulgaria
2

			1	2	3
1	(United States) (Bulgaria)	Bethanie Mattek-Sands; Tsvetana Pironkova	6; 4	6; 4
2	(United States) (Bulgaria)	Mardy Fish; Grigor Dimitrov	2; 6	1; 6
3	(United States) (Bulgaria)	Bethanie Mattek-Sands / Mardy Fish; Tsvetana Pironkova / Grigor Dimitrov	5; 8

=== Group B ===
All times are local (UTC+8).

==== Standings ====
Pos.	Country	W	L	Matches	Sets	Games
1	France	3	0	7–1	15–3	101–49
2	Spain	2	1	4–4	9–10	78–83
3	Australia	1	2	3–6	8–13	81–105
4	China	0	3	3–6	6–12	67–90

==== France vs. China ====
France
2
Crown Perth, Perth
31 December 2011, 09:30
Hard (indoors)

China
1

			1	2	3
1	(France) (China)	Marion Bartoli; Li Na	6; 2	2; 6	4; 6
2	(France) (China)	Richard Gasquet; Wu Di	6; 1	6; 3
3	(France) (China)	Marion Bartoli / Richard Gasquet; Li Na / Wu Di	6; 1	6; 1

==== Australia vs. Spain ====
Australia
1
Crown Perth, Perth
1 January 2012, 15:00
Hard (indoors)

Spain
2

			1	2	3
1	(Australia) (Spain)	Jarmila Gajdošová; Anabel Medina Garrigues	6; 3	3; 6	6; 3
2	(Australia) (Spain)	Lleyton Hewitt; Fernando Verdasco	3; 6	6; 3	5; 7
3	(Australia) (Spain)	Jarmila Gajdošová / Lleyton Hewitt; Anabel Medina Garrigues / Fernando Verdasco	6; 3	3; 6	9; 11

==== Spain vs. China ====
Spain
2
Crown Perth, Perth
3 January 2012, 09:30
Hard (indoors)

China
1

			1	2	3
1	(Spain) (China)	Anabel Medina Garrigues; Li Na	3; 6	1; 6
2	(Spain) (China)	Fernando Verdasco; Wu Di	6; 3	6; 4
3	(Spain) (China)	Anabel Medina Garrigues / Fernando Verdasco; Li Na / Wu Di	6; 0	6; 2

==== Australia vs. France ====
Australia
0
Crown Perth, Perth
3 January 2012, 17:00
Hard (indoors)

France
3

			1	2	3
1	(Australia) (France)	Jarmila Gajdošová; Marion Bartoli	0; 6	0; 6
2	(Australia) (France)	Lleyton Hewitt; Richard Gasquet	2; 6	7; 5	1; 6
3	(Australia) (France)	Jarmila Gajdošová / Lleyton Hewitt; Marion Bartoli / Richard Gasquet	3; 6	4; 6

==== France vs. Spain ====
France
2
Crown Perth, Perth
5 January 2012, 13:00
Hard (indoors)

Spain
0

			1	2	3
1	(France) (Spain)	Marion Bartoli; Anabel Medina Garrigues	6; 2	6; 4
2	(France) (Spain)	Richard Gasquet; Fernando Verdasco	6; 2	6; 4
3	(France) (Spain)	Marion Bartoli / Richard Gasquet; Anabel Medina Garrigues / Fernando Verdasco				not played

==== Australia vs. China ====
Australia
2
Crown Perth, Perth
5 January 2012, 17:00
Hard (indoors)

China
1

			1	2	3
1	(Australia) (China)	Jarmila Gajdošová; Li Na	3; 6	2; 6
2	(Australia) (China)	Lleyton Hewitt; Wu Di	6; 4	7; 5
3	(Australia) (China)	Jarmila Gajdošová / Lleyton Hewitt; Li Na / Wu Di	8; 5

== Final ==
=== Czech Republic vs. France ===
Czech Republic
2
Crown Perth, Perth
7 January 2012, 15:00 AWST (UTC+8)
Hard (indoors)

France
0

			1	2	3
1	(Czech Republic) (France)	Petra Kvitová; Marion Bartoli	7; 5	6; 1
2	(Czech Republic) (France)	Tomáš Berdych; Richard Gasquet	7^{7} 6^{0}	6; 4
3	(Czech Republic) (France)	Petra Kvitová / Tomáš Berdych; Marion Bartoli / Richard Gasquet				not played

2012 Hopman Cup Champions
(Czech Republic)
Czech Republic
Second title
