= 1990 Hopman Cup =

- Date: 26 December 1989 – 1 January 1990
- Edition: II (2nd)
- Surface: Hard indoor
- Location: Perth, Western Australia
- Venue: Burswood Entertainment Complex

Champions
- Spain
← 1989 ·	Hopman Cup	· 1991 →

The 1990 Hopman Cup was the second edition of the Hopman Cup, an international mixed teams tournament played at the Burswood Entertainment Complex in Perth, Western Australia. The event was held from 26 December 1989 through 1 January 1990.

Twelve teams competed in the tournament with the top four seeded teams (United States, Spain, Czechoslovakia and the Soviet Union) each receiving a bye into the quarter-finals. The remaining eight teams played in the first round. In the final which was played on 1 January, Spanish pair, Arantxa Sánchez Vicario and Emilio Sánchez defeated the American pair, Pam Shriver and John McEnroe 2–1 to record Spain's first victory at the Hopman Cup.

== Teams ==
=== Seeds ===
1. United States – Pam Shriver and John McEnroe (final)
2. Spain – Arantxa Sánchez Vicario and Emilio Sánchez (champions)
3. Czechoslovakia – Helena Suková and Petr Korda (semifinals)
4. Soviet Union – Natalia Zvereva and Andrei Chesnokov (quarterfinals)
5. Australia – Hana Mandlíková and Mark Woodforde (semifinals)
6. France – Isabelle Demongeot and Yannick Noah (quarterfinals)
7. Austria – Barbara Paulus and Thomas Muster (quarterfinals)
8. Italy – Laura Golarsa and Paolo Canè (quarterfinals)

=== Unseeded ===
- Sweden – Maria Lindström and Mikael Pernfors (first round)
- Yugoslavia – Sabrina Goleš and Slobodan Živojinović (first round)
- New Zealand – Belinda Cordwell and Kelly Evernden (first round)
- Netherlands – Brenda Schultz and Michiel Schapers (first round)

== Draw ==
First Round
Sweden	1
8	Italy	2
Yugoslavia	0
5	Australia	3
6	France	2
Netherlands	1
7	Austria	3
New Zealand	0

Quarterfinals
1	United States	3
8	Italy	0
4	Soviet Union	0
5	Australia	3
6	France	0
3	Czechoslovakia	3
7	Austria	1
2	Spain	2

Semifinals
1	United States	3
5	Australia	0
2	Spain	2
3	Czechoslovakia	1

Final
1	United States	1
2	Spain	2

== First round ==
The opening round of the 1990 Hopman Cup took place on Boxing Day (26 December) with the day match between eighth seed Italy and Sweden. In the opening match, Italian player Paolo Canè struggled in his first single match against Swedish player Mikael Pernfors as he went down in three sets. Italy though would come back in the remaining two rubbers with Cane and Laura Golarsa winning the mixed doubles in straight sets before Golarsa took out the tie. In the night session, fifth seed Australia defeated Yugoslavia 3–0 to book their spot in the quarter-finals with straight sets victories for Mark Woodforde and Hana Mandlíková.

The second day saw the remaining two matches of the opening round of competition. First was seventh seed, Austria who clean-sweep their tie against New Zealand with Thomas Muster and Barbara Paulus both winning their single matches in straight sets before being pushed to three in the mixed doubles. The final match of the opening round saw the tie between sixth seed, France and the Netherlands lasting seven hours. After Isabelle Demongeot won the women's singles in three singles, the tie headed into a third deciding rubber after the Netherlands pair of Michiel Schapers and Brenda Schultz won the rubber, 6–3, 6–2. After the match, Yannick Noah stated, "I don't know whether I was playing tennis or being a clown." In the deciding rubber, Noah loss the first set, 6–3 and trailed Schapers 5–4 in the second before coming back and winning the remaining two sets in a tiebreaker to book France's spot into the quarters.

=== Sweden vs. Italy ===
Sweden
1
Burswood Entertainment Complex
26 December 1989
Hard (indoors)

Italy
2

			1	2	3
1	(Sweden) (Italy)	Mikael Pernfors; Paolo Canè	3; 6	6; 4	6; 3
2	(Sweden) (Italy)	Mikael Pernfors / Maria Lindström; Paolo Canè / Laura Golarsa	5; 7	3; 6
3	(Sweden) (Italy)	Maria Lindström; Laura Golarsa	1; 6	1; 6

=== Yugoslavia vs. Australia ===
Yugoslavia
0
Burswood Entertainment Complex
26 December 1989
Hard (indoors)

Australia
3

			1	2	3
1	(Socialist Federal Republic of Yugoslavia) (Australia)	Slobodan Živojinović; Mark Woodforde	1; 6	1; 6
2	(Socialist Federal Republic of Yugoslavia) (Australia)	Slobodan Živojinović / Sabrina Goleš; Mark Woodforde / Hana Mandlíková	1; 6	5; 7
3	(Socialist Federal Republic of Yugoslavia) (Australia)	Sabrina Goleš; Hana Mandlíková	0; 6	0; 6

=== Austria vs. New Zealand ===
Austria
3
Burswood Entertainment Complex
27 December 1989
Hard (indoors)

New Zealand
0

			1	2	3
1	(Austria) (New Zealand)	Thomas Muster; Kelly Evernden	6; 3	6; 2
2	(Austria) (New Zealand)	Thomas Muster / Barbara Paulus; Kelly Evernden / Belinda Cordwell	7; 5	5; 7	6; 4
3	(Austria) (New Zealand)	Barbara Paulus; Belinda Cordwell	6; 1	6; 2

=== France vs. Netherlands ===
France
2
Burswood Entertainment Complex
27 December 1989
Hard (indoors)

Netherlands
1

			1	2	3
1	(France) (Netherlands)	Isabelle Demongeot; Brenda Schultz	4; 6	7; 5	6; 4
2	(France) (Netherlands)	Yannick Noah / Isabelle Demongeot; Michiel Schapers / Brenda Schultz	3; 6	2; 6
3	(France) (Netherlands)	Yannick Noah; Michiel Schapers	4; 6	7^{7} 6^{3}	7^{9} 6^{7}

== Quarter-finals ==
The quarter-finals began on 28 December 1989, with Australia taking on fourth seed, the Soviet Union in the opening match of the quarters. In what would soon be an easy tie, the Australians only dropped seventeen games throughout the three matches to defeat the Soviets 3–0 with Mandlíková and Woodforde securing straight set victories in all of the matches. Before the match against France, Czeechoslovakia player Miloslav Mečíř was replaced with 63rd ranked player Petr Korda due to torn ligaments in his ankles due to skiing accident, three weeks prior. In the women's singles, the use of the cross-court play put Demongeot on the wrong side of court as she led the French woman to ten double faults in the three set match. Czechoslovakia took out the title in the mixed doubles with Mecir and Helena Suková winning in three sets. Mecir went on to get the sweep for Czechoslovakia, defeating Noah in straight sets.

The brother-sister combination of Arantxa Sánchez Vicario and Emilio Sánchez opened their campaigns with a 2–1 win over the Austrians in their quarter final with the women's match going to three sets while the men's match lasted until 1:30am with Thomas Muster coming out on top in three after conceding the first set in a tiebreaker. Top seeds, United States won their opening tie against Italy 3–0, but the match was notable for John McEnroe clashing with English umpire, Jane Tabor before forfeiting the game for sitting down. He would go on to win the match in three sets.

=== Australia vs. Soviet Union ===
Australia
3
Burswood Entertainment Complex
28 December 1989
Hard (indoors)

Soviet Union
0

			1	2	3
1	(Australia) (Soviet Union)	Hana Mandlíková; Natalia Zvereva	6; 4	6; 1
2	(Australia) (Soviet Union)	Mark Woodforde / Hana Mandlíková; Andrei Chesnokov / Natalia Zvereva	6; 3	6; 2
3	(Australia) (Soviet Union)	Mark Woodforde; Andrei Chesnokov	6; 4	6; 2

=== France vs. Czechoslovakia ===
France
0
Burswood Entertainment Complex
29 December 1989
Hard (indoors)

Czechoslovakia
3

			1	2	3
1	(France) (Czechoslovakia)	Isabelle Demongeot; Helena Suková	4; 6	6; 3	5; 7
2	(France) (Czechoslovakia)	Yannick Noah / Isabelle Demongeot; Petr Korda / Helena Suková	4; 6	7; 5	5; 7
3	(France) (Czechoslovakia)	Yannick Noah; Petr Korda	6^{6} 7^{8}	1; 6

=== Austria vs. Spain ===
Austria
1
Burswood Entertainment Complex
29 December 1989
Hard (indoors)

Spain
2

			1	2	3
1	(Austria) (Spain)	Barbara Paulus; Arantxa Sánchez Vicario	4; 6	7; 6	5; 7
2	(Austria) (Spain)	Thomas Muster / Barbara Paulus; Emilio Sánchez / Arantxa Sánchez Vicario	6; 7	4; 6
3	(Austria) (Spain)	Thomas Muster; Emilio Sánchez	6; 7	6; 2	6; 4

=== United States vs. Italy ===
United States
3
Burswood Entertainment Complex
30 December 1989
Hard (indoors)

Italy
0

			1	2	3
1	(United States) (Italy)	Pam Shriver; Laura Golarsa	6; 2	6; 4
2	(United States) (Italy)	John McEnroe / Pam Shriver; Paolo Canè / Laura Golarsa	6; 1	6; 4
3	(United States) (Italy)	John McEnroe; Paolo Canè	6; 4	4; 6	6; 4

== Semi-finals ==
The first semi-final was Spain and Czechoslovakia on 30 December 1989. In the opening rubber, Emilio Sánchez got the break in the seventh game of the first set but conceded it in the next game with the set going to Sanchez in a tiebreaker. The second set saw only one break of serve with Korda serve being broken to give Spain the lead. After the Spanish conceded the mixed doubles in straight sets, Arantxa Sánchez had trouble with her strained leg muscle putting her one break down in the second set after losing the first 6–3. But words of encouragement from her brother, saw Arantxa win the next two sets in tiebreakers to book Spain a spot in the final.

The second semi-final was played the following day and saw the United States take on Australia. For Mark Woodforde, he was never in the match with two breaks off the Woodforde serve giving McEnroe the first set with the second set also going to the American as McEnroe gave the United States a lead. Australia got an early break in the mixed doubles with the McEnroe dropping his serve to give Australia a two-game lead. But two consecutive breaks off the Mandlíková serve gave the United States the first set, 6–4. The second set was a tiebreak which Australia came back from 4–0 to level it five-all before the United States took out the tie. The third match wasn't played due to the withdrawal of Mandlíková due to a back complaint.

=== Spain vs. Czechoslovakia ===
Spain
2
Burswood Entertainment Complex
30 December 1989
Hard (indoors)

Czechoslovakia
1

			1	2	3
1	(Spain) (Czechoslovakia)	Emilio Sánchez; Petr Korda	7^{7} 6^{3}	6; 4
2	(Spain) (Czechoslovakia)	Emilio Sánchez / Arantxa Sánchez Vicario; Petr Korda / Helena Suková	1; 6	2; 6
3	(Spain) (Czechoslovakia)	Arantxa Sánchez Vicario; Helena Suková	3; 6	7^{7} 6^{3}	7^{8} 6^{6}

=== United States vs. Australia ===
United States
3
Burswood Entertainment Complex
31 December 1989
Hard (indoors)

Australia
0

			1	2	3
1	(United States) (Australia)	John McEnroe; Mark Woodforde	6; 3	6; 3
2	(United States) (Australia)	John McEnroe / Pam Shriver; Mark Woodforde / Hana Mandlíková	6; 4	7^{7} 6^{5}
3	(United States) (Australia)	Pam Shriver; Hana Mandlíková				w/o

== Final ==
The final of the 1990 Hopman Cup was played on 1 January 1990 between Spain and the United States. In the opening rubber, McEnroe got the jump over Emilio Sánchez in the first set winning 7–5. Emilio Sánchez came back to level the rubber, winning the second set with the same scoreline with McEnroe being penalized a point penalty which gave Sanchez the break. From there, the Spaniard went on to win the match in three sets, taking out the final set 7–5. After the Americans took out the mixed doubles in straight sets, the tie went to a deciding third with Arantxa Sánchez taking the match and the title with a straight set victory.

Spain
2
Burswood Entertainment Complex
1 January 1990
Hard (indoors)

United States
1

			1	2	3
1	(Spain) (United States)	Emilio Sánchez; John McEnroe	5; 7	7; 5	7; 5
2	(Spain) (United States)	Emilio Sánchez / Arantxa Sánchez; John McEnroe / Pam Shriver	3; 6	2; 6
3	(Spain) (United States)	Arantxa Sánchez; Pam Shriver	6; 3	6; 3

1990 Hopman Cup Champions
(Spain)
Spain
First title
