= Bulgaria at the Hopman Cup =

Sporting event delegation

Bulgaria
- First year: 2012
- Years played: 1
- Most total wins: Grigor Dimitrov (5–1)
- Most singles wins: Grigor Dimitrov (2–1)
- Most doubles wins: Tsvetana Pironkova (3–0); Grigor Dimitrov (3–0)
- Best doubles team: Tsvetana Pironkova & Grigor Dimitrov (3–0)
- Most years played: Tsvetana Pironkova (1); Grigor Dimitrov (1)

Bulgaria is a nation that has appeared at Hopman Cup on one occasion, in 2012.

== Players ==
This is a list of players who have played for Bulgaria in the Hopman Cup.

Name	Total W–L	Singles W–L	Doubles W–L	First year played	No. of years played
Grigor Dimitrov	5–1	2–1	3–0	2012	1
Tsvetana Pironkova	3–3	0–3	3–0	2012	1

== Results ==
Year	Competition	Location	Opponent	Score	Result
2012	Round Robin	Burswood Dome, Perth	Czech Republic	1–2	Lost
2012	Round Robin	Burswood Dome, Perth	Denmark	2–1	Won
2012	Round Robin	Burswood Dome, Perth	United States	2–1	Won
