= 1995 Hopman Cup =

- Date: 31 December 1994 – 7 January 1995
- Edition: VII
- Surface: Hard (indoor)
- Location: Perth, Western Australia
- Venue: Burswood Entertainment Complex

Champions
- Germany
← 1994 ·	Hopman Cup	· 1996 →

The 1995 Hopman Cup was the seventh edition of the Hopman Cup that was held at the Burswood Entertainment Complex, in Perth, Western Australia.

== Teams ==
=== Seeds ===
1. Czech Republic – Jana Novotná and Petr Korda (semifinals)
2. Germany – Anke Huber and Boris Becker (champions)
3. Spain - Conchita Martínez and Albert Costa (quarterfinals)
4. United States – Lindsay Davenport and Richey Reneberg (quarterfinals)
5. Ukraine - Natalia Medvedeva and Andrei Medvedev (final)
6. France - Julie Halard and Jean-Philippe Fleurian (semifinals)
7. South Africa - Amanda Coetzer and Christo van Rensburg (first round)
8. Austria - Judith Wiesner and Horst Skoff (quarterfinals)

=== Unseeded ===
- Argentina – Inés Gorrochategui and Javier Frana (first round)
- Australia – Kristine Radford and Pat Cash (quarterfinals)
- Netherlands – Brenda Schultz and Tom Nijssen (first round)
- Sweden – Åsa Carlsson and Mats Wilander (first round)

== Draw ==
First Round
7	South Africa	1
Australia	2
5	Ukraine	2
Sweden	1
Netherlands	1
6	France	2
Argentina	1
8	Austria	2

Quarterfinals
1	Czech Republic	2
Australia	1
4	United States	1
5	Ukraine	2
6	France	3
3	Spain	0
8	Austria	1
2	Germany	2

Semifinals
1	Czech Republic	1
5	Ukraine	2
6	France	1
2	Germany	2

Finals
5	Ukraine	0
2	Germany	3

== First round ==
=== South Africa vs. Australia ===
South Africa
1
Burswood Entertainment Complex, Perth, Western Australia
1995
Indoor Hard

Australia
2

			1	2	3
1	(South Africa) (Australia)	Amanda Coetzer; Kristine Radford	6; 1	6; 1
2	(South Africa) (Australia)	Christo van Rensburg; Pat Cash	5; 7	2; 6
3	(South Africa) (Australia)	Christo van Rensburg / Amanda Coetzer; Pat Cash / Kristine Radford	6; 7	6; 7

=== Ukraine vs. Sweden ===
Ukraine
2
Burswood Entertainment Complex, Perth, Western Australia
1995
Indoor Hard

Sweden
1

			1	2	3
1	(Ukraine) (Sweden)	Natalia Medvedeva; Åsa Carlsson	6; 7	6; 4	7; 5
2	(Ukraine) (Sweden)	Andrei Medvedev; Mats Wilander	6; 2	4; 6	3; 6
3	(Ukraine) (Sweden)	Andrei Medvedev / Natalia Medvedeva; Mats Wilander / Åsa Carlsson	6; 2	6; 2

=== Netherlands vs. France ===
Netherlands
1
Burswood Entertainment Complex, Perth, Western Australia
1995
Indoor Hard

France
2

			1	2	3
1	(Netherlands) (France)	Brenda Schultz; Julie Halard	6; 0	6; 3
2	(Netherlands) (France)	Tom Nijssen; Jean-Philippe Fleurian	6; 7	6; 3	3; 6
3	(Netherlands) (France)	Tom Nijssen / Brenda Schultz; Jean-Philippe Fleurian / Julie Halard	6; 3	2; 6	6; 7

=== Argentina vs. Austria ===
Argentina
1
Burswood Entertainment Complex, Perth, Western Australia
1995
Indoor Hard

Austria
2

			1	2	3
1	(Argentina) (Austria)	Inés Gorrochategui; Judith Wiesner	1; 6	5; 7
2	(Argentina) (Austria)	Javier Frana; Horst Skoff	1; 6	4; 6
3	(Argentina) (Austria)	Javier Frana / Inés Gorrochategui; Horst Skoff / Judith Wiesner	6; 4	7; 5

== Quarterfinals ==
=== Czech Republic vs. Australia ===
Czech Republic
2
Burswood Entertainment Complex, Perth, Western Australia
1995
Indoor Hard

Australia
1

			1	2	3
1	(Czech Republic) (Australia)	Jana Novotna; Kristine Radford	6; 3	6; 3
2	(Czech Republic) (Australia)	Petr Korda; Pat Cash	2; 6	6; 3	7; 6
3	(Czech Republic) (Australia)	Petr Korda / Jana Novotna; Pat Cash / Kristine Radford	3; 6	4; 6

=== United States vs. Ukraine ===
United States
1
Burswood Entertainment Complex, Perth, Western Australia
1995
Indoor Hard

Ukraine
2

			1	2	3
1	(United States) (Ukraine)	Lindsay Davenport; Natalia Medvedeva	0; 6	4; 6
2	(United States) (Ukraine)	Richey Reneberg; Andrei Medvedev	7; 6	6; 7	3; 6
3	(United States) (Ukraine)	Richey Reneberg / Lindsay Davenport; Andrei Medvedev / Natalia Medvedeva	6; 3	6; 2

=== France vs. Spain ===
France
3
Burswood Entertainment Complex, Perth, Western Australia
1995
Indoor Hard

Spain
0

			1	2	3
1	(France) (Spain)	Julie Halard; Conchita Martínez	7; 6	7; 5
2	(France) (Spain)	Jean-Philippe Fleurian; Albert Costa	7; 5	6; 1
3	(France) (Spain)	Jean-Philippe Fleurian / Julie Halard; Albert Costa / Conchita Martínez	6; 0	6; 0

=== Austria vs. Germany ===
Austria
1
Burswood Entertainment Complex, Perth, Western Australia
1995
Indoor Hard

Germany
2

			1	2	3
1	(Austria) (Germany)	Judith Wiesner; Anke Huber	1; 6	2; 6
2	(Austria) (Germany)	Horst Skoff; Boris Becker	3; 6	4; 6
3	(Austria) (Germany)	Horst Skoff / Judith Wiesner; Boris Becker / Anke Huber	5; 7	6; 4	7; 5

== Semifinals ==
=== Czech Republic vs. Ukraine ===
Czech Republic
1
Burswood Entertainment Complex, Perth, Western Australia
1995
Indoor Hard

Ukraine
2

			1	2	3
1	(Czech Republic) (Ukraine)	Jana Novotna; Natalia Medvedeva	1; 6	7; 6	3; 6
2	(Czech Republic) (Ukraine)	Petr Korda; Andrei Medvedev	6; 7	6; 7
3	(Czech Republic) (Ukraine)	Petr Korda / Jana Novotna; Andrei Medvedev / Natalia Medvedeva	8; 3

=== France vs. Germany ===
France
1
Burswood Entertainment Complex, Perth, Western Australia
1995
Indoor Hard

Germany
2

			1	2	3
1	(France) (Germany)	Julie Halard; Anke Huber	2; 6	1; 6
2	(France) (Germany)	Jean-Philippe Fleurian; Boris Becker	6; 7	6; 7
3	(France) (Germany)	Jean-Philippe Fleurian / Julie Halard; Boris Becker / Anke Huber	8; 5

== Final ==
=== Germany vs. Ukraine ===
Ukraine
0
Burswood Entertainment Complex, Perth, Western Australia
1995
Indoor Hard

Germany
3

			1	2	3
1	(Ukraine) (Germany)	Natalia Medvedeva; Anke Huber	4; 6	6; 3	4; 6
2	(Ukraine) (Germany)	Andrei Medvedev; Boris Becker	3; 6	7; 6	3; 6
3	(Ukraine) (Germany)	Andrei Medvedev / Natalia Medvedeva; Boris Becker / Anke Huber				w/o

1995 Hopman Cup Champions
(Germany)
Germany
Second title
