= India at the Hopman Cup =

Sporting event delegation

India
- First year: 2007
- Years played: 2
- Best finish: Finished 2nd in group (2007)
- Most total wins: Sania Mirza (9–3)
- Most singles wins: Sania Mirza (3–3)
- Most doubles wins: Sania Mirza (6–0); Rohan Bopanna (6–0)
- Best doubles team: Sania Mirza & Rohan Bopanna (6–0)
- Most years played: Sania Mirza (2); Rohan Bopanna (2)

India is a nation that has competed at the Hopman Cup tournament on two occasions. The nation's first appearance came in 2007, courtesy of a wild card earned by winning the inaugural Asian Hopman Cup (a now defunct qualification tournament for Asian nations which ran from 2006 until 2009). This remains their best performance to date.

India also participated in the Asian Hopman Cup on two other occasions. In the 2008 and 2009 events, they failed to progress past the round robin stages of the event.

== Players ==
This is a list of players who have played for India in the Hopman Cup.

Name	Total W–L	Singles W–L	Doubles W–L	First year played	No. of years played
Rohan Bopanna	6–6	0–6	6–0	2007	2
Sania Mirza	9–3	3–3	6–0	2007	2

== Results ==
Year	Competition	Location	Opponent	Score	Result
2007	Round Robin	Burswood Dome, Perth	Czech Republic	2–1	Won
2007	Round Robin	Burswood Dome, Perth	Croatia	2–1	Won
2007	Round Robin	Burswood Dome, Perth	Spain	1–2	Lost
2008	Round Robin	Burswood Dome, Perth	United States	1–2	Lost
2008	Round Robin	Burswood Dome, Perth	Australia	2–1	Won
2008	Round Robin	Burswood Dome, Perth	Czech Republic	1–2	Lost
