= 2019 Hopman Cup =

- Date: 29 December 2018 – 6 January 2019
- Edition: XXXI (31st)
- Surface: Hard (indoor)
- Location: Perth, Western Australia
- Venue: Perth Arena

Champions
- Switzerland
- Hopman Cup

The Hopman Cup XXXI was the 31st edition of the Hopman Cup tournament between nations in men's and women's tennis and the final edition that took place at the Perth Arena in Perth, Western Australia.

On 26 June 2018, the defending Swiss team of Roger Federer and Belinda Bencic and 2018 finalist German team of Alexander Zverev and Angelique Kerber were announced as the first teams for the 2019 tournament. On 15 August 2018, the teams of Greece and Spain were announced.

For the first time in history, Roger Federer and Serena Williams faced each other in a competitive event. Federer came out victorious alongside Bencic in the mixed doubles rubber. This match also attracted a Perth Arena record tennis crowd of 14,064, which was the highest attendance for a tennis match in Western Australian history.

Switzerland successfully defended their title, beating Germany in a repeat of the previous year's final. This was Federer's 3rd Hopman Cup title, the most by any player, male or female.

== Entrants ==
=== Seeds ===
The draw took place on 3 October 2018 and it placed the 8 teams into two groups, according to the following ranking-based seedings:

| Seed | Team | Female player | WTA^{1} | Male player | ATP^{1} | Total | Elimination |
|---|---|---|---|---|---|---|---|
| 1 | Germany | Angelique Kerber | 2 | Alexander Zverev | 5 | 7 | Runner-up |
| 2 | Switzerland | Belinda Bencic | 41 | Roger Federer | 2 | 43 | Champions |
| 3 | France | Alizé Cornet | 39 | Lucas Pouille | 19 | 58 | Round robin |
| 4 | United States | Serena Williams | 17 | Frances Tiafoe | 41 | 58 | Round robin |
| 5 | Greece | Maria Sakkari | 43 | Stefanos Tsitsipas | 15 | 58 | Round robin |
| 6 | Australia | Ashleigh Barty | 19 | Matthew Ebden | 48 | 67 | Round robin |
| 7 | Spain | Garbiñe Muguruza | 15 | David Ferrer | 147 | 162 | Round robin |
| 8 | Great Britain | Katie Boulter | 109 | Cameron Norrie | 78 | 187 | Round robin |
^{1} – ATP and WTA rankings as of 1 October 2018 (latest before draw date)

=== Alternated ===
In-tournament partial replacement (in doubles matches only)
| Team | In | For | Reason |
|---|---|---|---|
| Spain | (United States) Whitney Osuigwe | Garbiñe Muguruza | Injury |

== Group stage ==
=== Group A ===
==== Standings ====
| | | Germany | France | Australia | Spain | RR W–L | Matches W–L | Sets W–L | Games W–L | Standings |
|---|---|---|---|---|---|---|---|---|---|---|
| 1 | Germany | | 2–1 | 2–1 | 3–0 | 3–0 | 7–2 | 14–8 | 108–88 | 1 |
| 3 | France | 1–2 | | 1–2 | 1–2 | 0–3 | 3–6 | 10–12 | 92–106 | 4 |
| 6 | Australia | 1–2 | 2–1 | | 2–1 | 2–1 | 5–4 | 10–10 | 91–88 | 2 |
| 7 | Spain | 0–3 | 2–1 | 1–2 | | 1–2 | 3–6 | 9–13 | 94–103 | 3 |

All times are local (UTC+8).

==== Australia vs. France ====
Australia
2
Perth Arena, Perth
29 December 2018, 17:30
Hard (i)

France
1

| | | | 1 | 2 | 3 |
|---|---|---|---|---|---|
| 1 | (Australia) (France) | Ashleigh Barty; Alizé Cornet | 7; 5 | 6; 3 |
| 2 | (Australia) (France) | Matthew Ebden; Lucas Pouille | 3; 6 | 7^{7} 6^{5} | 6; 2 |
| 3 | (Australia) (France) | Ashleigh Barty / Matthew Ebden; Alizé Cornet / Lucas Pouille | 3.039; 4 | 2; 4 |

==== Germany vs. Spain ====
Germany
3
Perth Arena, Perth
30 December 2018, 10:00
Hard (i)

Spain
0

| | | | 1 | 2 | 3 |
|---|---|---|---|---|---|
| 1 | (Germany) (Spain) | Angelique Kerber; Garbiñe Muguruza | 6; 2 | 3; 6 | 6; 3 |
| 2 | (Germany) (Spain) | Alexander Zverev; David Ferrer | 6; 4 | 4; 6 | 7^{7} 6^{0} |
| 3 | (Germany) (Spain) | Angelique Kerber / Alexander Zverev; Garbiñe Muguruza / David Ferrer | 4; 2 | 4; 3.029 |

==== France vs. Germany ====
France
1
Perth Arena, Perth
2 January 2019, 10:00
Hard (i)

Germany
2

| | | | 1 | 2 | 3 |
|---|---|---|---|---|---|
| 1 | (France) (Germany) | Alizé Cornet; Angelique Kerber | 7; 5 | 2; 6 | 4; 6 |
| 2 | (France) (Germany) | Lucas Pouille; Alexander Zverev | 3; 6 | 7^{10} 6^{8} | 2; 6 |
| 3 | (France) (Germany) | Alizé Cornet / Lucas Pouille; Angelique Kerber / Alexander Zverev | 4; 3.039 | 4; 3.029 |

==== Australia vs. Spain ====
Australia
2
Perth Arena, Perth
2 January 2019, 17:30
Hard (i)

Spain
1

| | | | 1 | 2 | 3 |
|---|---|---|---|---|---|
| 1 | (Australia) (Spain) | Ashleigh Barty; Garbiñe Muguruza | 6; 3 | 6; 4 |
| 2 | (Australia) (Spain) | Matthew Ebden; David Ferrer | 6^{1} 7^{7} | 5; 7 |
| 3 | (Australia) (Spain) | Ashleigh Barty / Matthew Ebden; Garbiñe Muguruza / David Ferrer | 3.029; 4 | 4; 3.00 | 4; 3.029 |

==== Spain vs. France ====
Spain
2
Perth Arena, Perth
4 January 2019, 10:00
Hard (i)

France
1

| | | | 1 | 2 | 3 |
|---|---|---|---|---|---|
| 1 | (Spain) (France) | Garbiñe Muguruza; Alizé Cornet | 6; 1 | 6; 3 |
| 2 | (Spain) (France) | David Ferrer; Lucas Pouille | 6; 4 | 6^{5} 7^{7} | 7^{7} 6^{2} |
| 3 | (Spain) (France) | Whitney Osuigwe / David Ferrer; Alizé Cornet / Lucas Pouille | 2; 4 | 2; 4 |

American Whitney Osuigwe played instead of Garbiñe Muguruza due to her withdrawal due to injury. Scores counted as a 4–0, 4–0 win for the French mixed pair.

==== Australia vs. Germany ====
Australia
1
Perth Arena, Perth
4 January 2019, 17:30
Hard (i)

Germany
2

| | | | 1 | 2 | 3 |
|---|---|---|---|---|---|
| 1 | (Australia) (Germany) | Ashleigh Barty; Angelique Kerber | 4; 6 | 4; 6 |
| 2 | (Australia) (Germany) | Matthew Ebden; Alexander Zverev | 4; 6 | 3; 6 |
| 3 | (Australia) (Germany) | Ashleigh Barty / Matthew Ebden; Angelique Kerber / Alexander Zverev | 4; 0 | 4; 3.009 |

=== Group B ===
==== Standings ====
| | | Switzerland | Greece | United States | Great Britain (United Kingdom) | RR W–L | Matches W–L | Sets W–L | Games W–L | Standings |
|---|---|---|---|---|---|---|---|---|---|---|
| 2 | Switzerland | | 1−2 | 2−1 | 3–0 | 2–1 | 6–3 | 14–6 | 97–74 | 1 |
| 4 | United States | 1−2 | 1–2 | | 1−2 | 0–3 | 3–6 | 9–13 | 86–99 | 4 |
| 5 | Greece | 2−1 | | 2–1 | 1–2 | 2–1 | 5–4 | 11–12 | 105−96 | 2 |
| 8 | Great Britain | 0–3 | 2–1 | 2−1 | | 2–1 | 4–5 | 9–12 | 77–96 | 3 |

All times are local (UTC+8).

==== Great Britain vs. Greece ====
Great Britain
2
Perth Arena, Perth
29 December 2018, 10:00
Hard (i)

Greece
1

| | | | 1 | 2 | 3 |
|---|---|---|---|---|---|
| 1 | (United Kingdom) (Greece) | Cameron Norrie; Stefanos Tsitsipas | 7^{10} 6^{8} | 6; 4 |
| 2 | (United Kingdom) (Greece) | Katie Boulter; Maria Sakkari | 0; 6 | 6; 4 | 2; 6 |
| 3 | (United Kingdom) (Greece) | Katie Boulter / Cameron Norrie; Maria Sakkari / Stefanos Tsitsipas | 4; 3.00 | 3.019; 4 | 4; 3.039 |

==== Great Britain vs. Switzerland ====
Great Britain
0
Perth Arena, Perth
30 December 2018, 17:30
Hard (i)

Switzerland
3

| | | | 1 | 2 | 3 |
|---|---|---|---|---|---|
| 1 | (United Kingdom) (Switzerland) | Cameron Norrie; Roger Federer | 1; 6 | 1; 6 |
| 2 | (United Kingdom) (Switzerland) | Katie Boulter; Belinda Bencic | 2; 6 | 6^{0} 7^{7} |
| 3 | (United Kingdom) (Switzerland) | Katie Boulter / Cameron Norrie; Belinda Bencic / Roger Federer | 3.039; 4 | 1; 4 |

==== United States vs. Greece ====
United States
1
Perth Arena, Perth
31 December 2018, 10:00
Hard (i)

Greece
2

| | | | 1 | 2 | 3 |
|---|---|---|---|---|---|
| 1 | (United States) (Greece) | Frances Tiafoe; Stefanos Tsitsipas | 3; 6 | 7^{7} 6^{3} | 3; 6 |
| 2 | (United States) (Greece) | Serena Williams; Maria Sakkari | 7^{7} 6^{3} | 6; 2 |
| 3 | (United States) (Greece) | Serena Williams / Frances Tiafoe; Maria Sakkari / Stefanos Tsitsipas | 1; 4 | 4; 1 | 2; 4 |

==== United States vs. Switzerland ====
United States
1
Perth Arena, Perth
1 January 2019, 17:30
Hard (i)

Switzerland
2

| | | | 1 | 2 | 3 |
|---|---|---|---|---|---|
| 1 | (United States) (Switzerland) | Frances Tiafoe; Roger Federer | 4; 6 | 1; 6 |
| 2 | (United States) (Switzerland) | Serena Williams; Belinda Bencic | 4; 6 | 6; 4 | 6; 3 |
| 3 | (United States) (Switzerland) | Serena Williams / Frances Tiafoe; Belinda Bencic / Roger Federer | 2; 4 | 3.029; 4 |

==== Great Britain vs. United States ====
Great Britain
2
Perth Arena, Perth
3 January 2019, 10:00
Hard (i)

United States
1

| | | | 1 | 2 | 3 |
|---|---|---|---|---|---|
| 1 | (United Kingdom) (United States) | Cameron Norrie; Frances Tiafoe | 7^{7} 6^{4} | 6; 0 |
| 2 | (United Kingdom) (United States) | Katie Boulter; Serena Williams | 1; 6 | 6^{2} 7^{7} |
| 3 | (United Kingdom) (United States) | Katie Boulter / Cameron Norrie; Serena Williams / Frances Tiafoe | 3.019; 4 | 4; 3.039 | 4; 1 |

==== Greece vs. Switzerland ====
Greece
2
Perth Arena, Perth
3 January 2019, 17:30
Hard (i)

Switzerland
1

| | | | 1 | 2 | 3 |
|---|---|---|---|---|---|
| 1 | (Greece) (Switzerland) | Stefanos Tsitsipas; Roger Federer | 6^{5} 7^{7} | 6^{4} 7^{7} |
| 2 | (Greece) (Switzerland) | Maria Sakkari; Belinda Bencic | 6; 3 | 6; 4 |
| 3 | (Greece) (Switzerland) | Maria Sakkari / Stefanos Tsitsipas; Belinda Bencic / Roger Federer | 4; 3.039 | 2; 4 | 4; 3.029 |

== Final ==
=== Germany vs. Switzerland ===
Germany
1
Perth Arena, Perth
5 January 2019, 16:00
Hard (i)

Switzerland
2

| | | | 1 | 2 | 3 |
|---|---|---|---|---|---|
| 1 | (Germany) (Switzerland) | Alexander Zverev; Roger Federer | 4; 6 | 2; 6 |
| 2 | (Germany) (Switzerland) | Angelique Kerber; Belinda Bencic | 6; 4 | 7^{8} 6^{6} |
| 3 | (Germany) (Switzerland) | Angelique Kerber / Alexander Zverev; Belinda Bencic / Roger Federer | 0; 4 | 4; 1 | 3; 4 |

Note: the championship was defined in a deciding point.

2019 Hopman Cup Champions
(Switzerland)
Switzerland
Fourth title
