= Zimbabwe at the Hopman Cup =

Sporting event delegation

Zimbabwe
- First year: 1999
- Years played: 2
- Best finish: Qualification play-offs (1999, 2005)
- Most total wins: Cara Black (2–3); Wayne Black (2–3)
- Most singles wins: Cara Black (0–3); Wayne Black (0–3)
- Most doubles wins: Cara Black (2–0); Wayne Black (2–0)
- Best doubles team: Cara Black & Wayne Black (2–0)
- Most years played: Cara Black (2); Wayne Black (2)

Zimbabwe is a nation that has competed at two Hopman Cup tournaments and first competed in the 11th Hopman Cup in 1999. Both times Zimbabwe has competed, it has lost in the qualification play-offs.

== Players ==
This is a list of players who have played for Zimbabwe in the Hopman Cup.

Name	Total W–L	Singles W–L	Doubles W–L	First year played	No. of years played
Cara Black	2–3	0–3	2–0	1999	2
Wayne Black	2–3	0–3	2–0	1999	2

== Results ==
Year	Competition	Location	Opponent	Score	Result
1999^{1}	Qualification Play-offs	Burswood Dome, Perth	France	1–2	Lost
1999^{1}	Round Robin	Burswood Dome, Perth	South Africa	1–2	Lost
2005	Qualification Play-offs	Burswood Dome, Perth	Netherlands	1–2	Lost

^{1} Despite losing in the qualification play-offs, Zimbabwe replaced the injured Spanish team for their final tie against South Africa.
