= 2009 Hopman Cup =

- Date: 3– 9 January 2009
- Edition: XXI
- Surface: Hard (indoor)
- Location: Perth, Western Australia
- Venue: Burswood Entertainment Complex

Champions
- Slovakia
- Hopman Cup

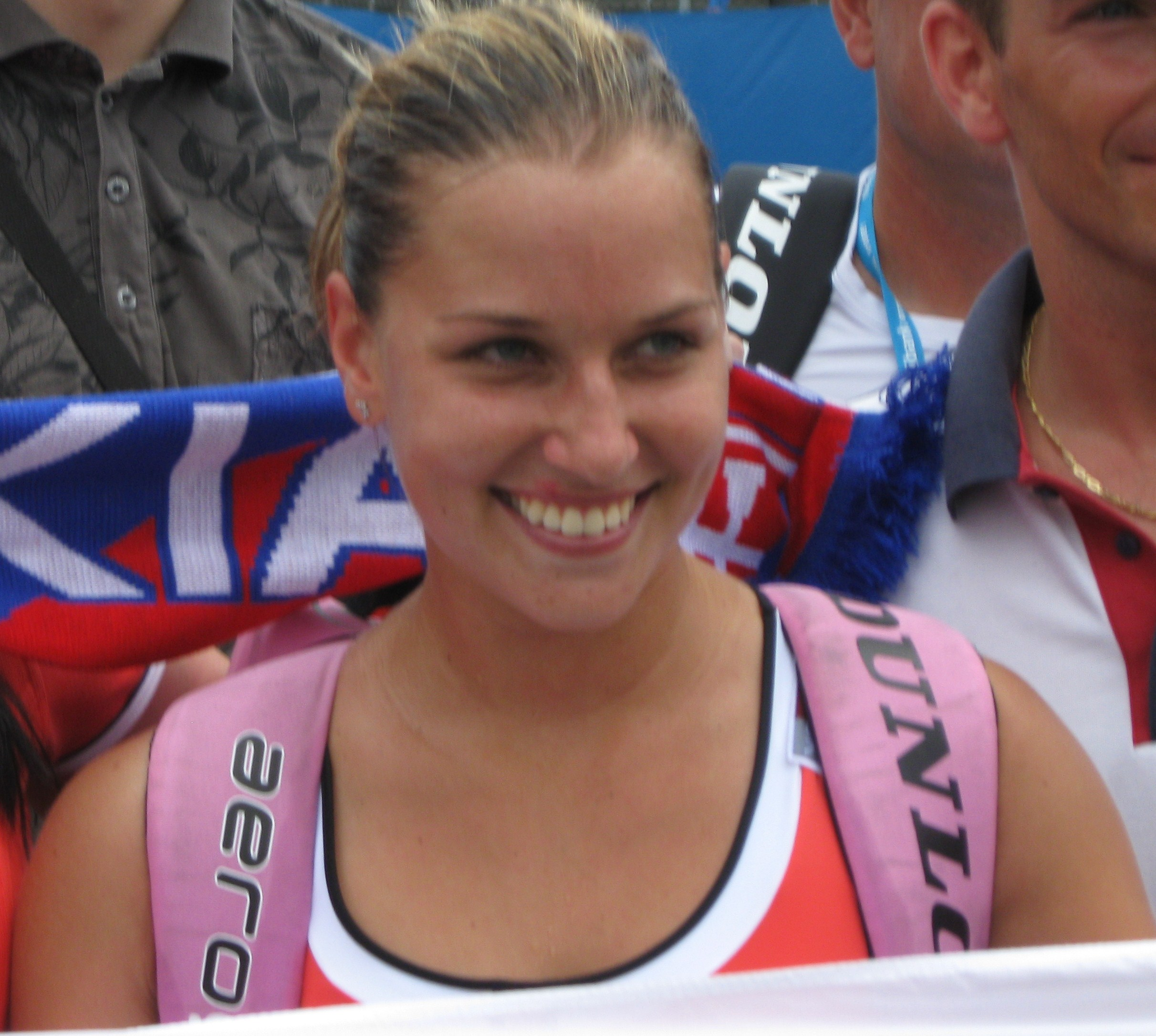
Dominika Cibulková won the Hopman Cup for Slovakia for the third time. She was partnered by Dominik Hrbatý, who won the competition for the second time.

The Hopman Cup XXI (also known as the Hyundai Hopman Cup for sponsorship reasons) corresponds to the 21st edition of the Hopman Cup tournament between nations in men's and women's tennis. The tournament was held from 3 January through 9 January 2009 at the Burswood Entertainment Complex in Perth, Western Australia.

Eight nations competed. They were formed of one man and one woman from the same nation. The nations were split into two pools of four in a round robin format, with the group winners contesting the final.

The United States were the defending champions and they were invited to compete again. Chinese Taipei qualified for the event by winning the Asian Hopman Cup.

Slovakia won their third title, defeating Russia in the final 2–0.

== Teams and seeding ==
1. USA – Meghann Shaughnessy and James Blake
2. RUS – Dinara Safina and Marat Safin (finalists)
3. FRA – Alizé Cornet and Gilles Simon
4. AUS – Casey Dellacqua and Lleyton Hewitt
5. ITA – Flavia Pennetta and Simone Bolelli
6. GER – Sabine Lisicki and Nicolas Kiefer
7. SVK – Dominika Cibulková and Dominik Hrbatý (champions)
8. TPE – Hsieh Su-wei and Lu Yen-hsun

== Group A ==
=== Standings ===
Pos.	Country	W	L	Matches	Sets
1	Slovakia	3	0	8 – 1	13 – 4
2	Germany	2	1	4 – 5	10 – 10
3	United States	1	2	3 – 6	9 – 14
4	Australia	0	3	3 – 6	10 – 14

=== Australia vs. Germany ===
Australia
1
Burswood Entertainment Complex, Perth
5 January 2009, 10:30 AWST (UTC+8)
hard (indoors)

Germany
2

			1	2	3
1	(Australia) (Germany)	Casey Dellacqua; Sabine Lisicki	6; 4	2; 6	5; 7
2	(Australia) (Germany)	Lleyton Hewitt; Nicolas Kiefer	6^{6} 7^{8}	6; 3	6; 2
3	(Australia) (Germany)	Casey Dellacqua / Lleyton Hewitt; Sabine Lisicki / Nicolas Kiefer	7^{7} 6^{2}	3; 6	5; 10

=== USA vs. Slovakia ===
United States
0
Burswood Entertainment Complex, Perth
5 January 2009, 18:00 AWST (UTC+8)
hard (indoors)

Slovakia
3

			1	2	3
1	(United States) (Slovakia)	Meghann Shaughnessy; Dominika Cibulková	2; 6	2; 6
2	(United States) (Slovakia)	James Blake; Dominik Hrbatý	3; 6	6; 4	6^{1} 7^{7}
3	(United States) (Slovakia)	Meghann Shaughnessy / James Blake; Dominika Cibulková / Dominik Hrbatý	4; 6	6^{5} 7^{7}

=== Australia vs. Slovakia ===
Australia
1
Burswood Entertainment Complex, Perth
6 January 2009, 18:00 AWST (UTC+8)
hard (indoors)

Slovakia
2

			1	2	3
1	(Australia) (Slovakia)	Casey Dellacqua; Dominika Cibulková	5; 7	2; 6
2	(Australia) (Slovakia)	Lleyton Hewitt; Dominik Hrbatý	7^{7} 6^{4}	6^{1} 7^{7}	6; 4
3	(Australia) (Slovakia)	Casey Dellacqua / Lleyton Hewitt; Dominika Cibulková / Dominik Hrbatý	7^{7} 6^{5}	3; 6	4; 10

=== USA vs. Germany ===
United States
1
Burswood Entertainment Complex, Perth
7 January 2009, 10:30 AWST (UTC+8)
hard (indoors)

Germany
2

			1	2	3
1	(United States) (Germany)	Meghann Shaughnessy; Sabine Lisicki	6; 4	0; 6	4; 6
2	(United States) (Germany)	James Blake; Nicolas Kiefer	7^{7} 6^{3}	6^{7} 7^{9}	6; 4
3	(United States) (Germany)	Meghann Shaughnessy / James Blake; Sabine Lisicki / Nicolas Kiefer	3; 6	6; 3	7; 10

=== USA vs. Australia ===
United States
2
Burswood Entertainment Complex, Perth
8 January 2009, 10:30 AWST (UTC+8)
hard (indoors)

Australia
1

			1	2	3
1	(United States) (Australia)	Meghann Shaughnessy; Casey Dellacqua	3; 6	4; 6
2	(United States) (Australia)	James Blake; Lleyton Hewitt	6; 2	6; 2
3	(United States) (Australia)	Meghann Shaughnessy / James Blake; Casey Dellacqua / Lleyton Hewitt	6; 3	5; 7	10; 6

=== Germany vs. Slovakia ===
Germany
0
Burswood Entertainment Complex, Perth
8 January 2009, 10:30 AWST (UTC+8)
hard (indoors)

Slovakia
3

			1	2	3
1	(Germany) (Slovakia)	Sabine Lisicki; Dominika Cibulková	6^{3} 7^{7}	4; 6
2	(Germany) (Slovakia)	Nicolas Kiefer; Dominik Hrbatý	3; 1			retired
3	(Germany) (Slovakia)	Sabine Lisicki / Nicolas Kiefer; Dominika Cibulková / Dominik Hrbatý				w/o

== Group B ==
=== Standings ===
Pos.	Country	W	L	Matches	Sets
1	Russia	3	0	6 – 3	14 – 7
2	Italy	2	1	6 – 3	8 – 7
3	France	1	2	5 – 4	10 – 8
4	Chinese Taipei	0	3	1 – 8	3 – 13

=== France vs. Chinese Taipei ===
France
3
Burswood Entertainment Complex, Perth
3 January 2009, 10:30 AWST (UTC+8)
hard (indoors)

Chinese Taipei
0

			1	2	3
1	(France) (Chinese Taipei)	Alizé Cornet; Hsieh Su-wei	6; 4	6; 4
2	(France) (Chinese Taipei)	Gilles Simon; Lu Yen-Hsun	6; 3	7^{8} 6^{6}
3	(France) (Chinese Taipei)	Alizé Cornet / Gilles Simon; Hsieh Su-wei / Lu Yen-Hsun	6; 4	7^{11} 6^{9}

=== Russia vs. Italy ===
Russia
2
Burswood Entertainment Complex, Perth
4 January 2009, 10:30 AWST (UTC+8)
hard (indoors)

Italy
1

			1	2	3
1	(Russia) (Italy)	Dinara Safina; Flavia Pennetta	7; 5	6; 3
2	(Russia) (Italy)	Marat Safin; Simone Bolelli	7^{7} 6^{5}	6; 4
3	(Russia) (Italy)	Dinara Safina / Marat Safin; Flavia Pennetta / Simone Bolelli	7; 5	4; 6	2; 10

=== France vs. Italy ===
France
1
Burswood Entertainment Complex, Perth
6 January 2009, 10:30 AWST (UTC+8)
hard (indoors)

Italy
2

			1	2	3
1	(France) (Italy)	Alizé Cornet; Flavia Pennetta	7; 5	6; 2
2	(France) (Italy)	Gilles Simon; Simone Bolelli	3; 6	3; 6
3	(France) (Italy)	Alizé Cornet / Gilles Simon; Flavia Pennetta / Simone Bolelli	4; 6	6^{2} 7^{7}

=== Russia vs. Chinese Taipei ===
Russia
2
Burswood Entertainment Complex, Perth
7 January 2009, 18:00 AWST (UTC+8)
hard (indoors)

Chinese Taipei
1

			1	2	3
1	(Russia) (Chinese Taipei)	Dinara Safina; Hsieh Su-wei	4; 6	6; 2	7; 5
2	(Russia) (Chinese Taipei)	Marat Safin; Lu Yen-Hsun	7^{8} 6^{6}	7; 5
3	(Russia) (Chinese Taipei)	Dinara Safina / Marat Safin; Hsieh Su-wei / Lu Yen-Hsun	6; 4	3; 6	8; 10

=== Russia vs. France ===
Russia
2
Burswood Entertainment Complex, Perth
8 January 2009, 18:00 AWST (UTC+8)
hard (indoors)

France
1

			1	2	3
1	(Russia) (France)	Dinara Safina; Alizé Cornet	6; 3	6; 2
2	(Russia) (France)	Marat Safin; Gilles Simon	6^{5} 7^{7}	3; 6
3	(Russia) (France)	Dinara Safina / Marat Safin; Alizé Cornet / Gilles Simon	6; 4	6; 3

=== Italy vs. Chinese Taipei ===
Italy
3
Burswood Entertainment Complex, Perth
8 January 2009, 18:00 AWST (UTC+8)
hard (indoors)

Chinese Taipei
0

			1	2	3
1	(Italy) (Chinese Taipei)	Flavia Pennetta; Hsieh Su-wei	7; 5	6; 3
2	(Italy) (Chinese Taipei)	Simone Bolelli; Lu Yen-Hsun				w/o
3	(Italy) (Chinese Taipei)	Flavia Pennetta / Simone Bolelli; Hsieh Su-wei / Lu Yen-Hsun				w/o

== Final ==
=== Slovakia vs. Russia ===
Slovakia
2
Burswood Entertainment Complex, Perth
9 January 2009, 18:00 AWST (UTC+8)
hard (indoors)

Russia
0

			1	2	3
1	(Slovakia) (Russia)	Dominika Cibulková; Dinara Safina	6^{3} 7^{7}	6; 1	6; 4
2	(Slovakia) (Russia)	Dominik Hrbatý; Marat Safin	6^{5} 7^{7}	7; 5	7^{7} 6^{3}
3	(Slovakia) (Russia)	Dominika Cibulková / Dominik Hrbatý; Dinara Safina / Marat Safin				not played

2009 Hopman Cup Champions
(Slovakia)
Slovakia
Third title
