= Karmen Škulj =

Slovenian tennis player

- Country (sports): Yugoslavia
- Born: 25 November 1967 (age 58)
- Retired: 1988
- Prize money: $9,442

Singles
- Career record: 35-23
- Career titles: 1 ITF
- Highest ranking: No. 203 (4 January 1988)

Doubles
- Career record: 12-17
- Career titles: 1 TF
- Highest ranking: No. 253 (25 April 1988)

Carmen Wiedenmann (born 25 November 1967) is a former Yugoslavian professional tennis player known by her birth name Karmen Škulj.

== Biography ==
Škulj comes from a family with a history in tennis. Two uncles Aleksander and Borut both played competitively and her aunt Irena competed for Yugoslavia in the Federation Cup. The Škulj Tenis Center in Dobrova was established by the family.

She has won one singles and one doubles title on the ITF Circuit. From 1986 to 1988, Škulj appeared in a total of eight ties for the Yugoslavia Federation Cup team. She also represented Yugoslavia at the 1989 Hopman Cup, where she teamed up with Slobodan Živojinović.

Škulj has a niece, Maja Živec-Škulj, who played on the WTA Tour in the 1990s. Her son, Luca Wiedenmann, is also a professional tennis player who previously competed in collegiate tennis for the University of Tennessee.

She is now known as Carmen Wiedenmann and works as a tennis trainer in Augsburg, Germany.

== ITF Circuit finals ==
$25,000 tournaments
$10,000 tournaments

=== Singles (1–0) ===
Result	No.	Date	Tournament	Surface	Opponent	Score
Win	1.	1 June 1987	Adria, Italy	Clay	(Greece) Olga Tsarbopoulou	3–6, 6–3, 6–3

=== Doubles (1–1) ===
Result	No.	Date	Tournament	Surface	Partner	Opponents	Score
Win	1.	24 September 1984	Bol, Yugoslavia	Clay	(Czechoslovakia) Miluše Dosedělová	(West Germany) Martina Reinhardt (United Kingdom) Joy Tacon	6–3, 6–4
Loss	2.	8 September 1986	Zagreb, Yugoslavia	Clay	(Socialist Federal Republic of Yugoslavia) Renata Šašak	(Soviet Union) Natalia Egorova (Soviet Union) Viktoria Milvidskaia	2–6, 3–6
