= Burswood, Western Australia =

Burswood
- Suburb
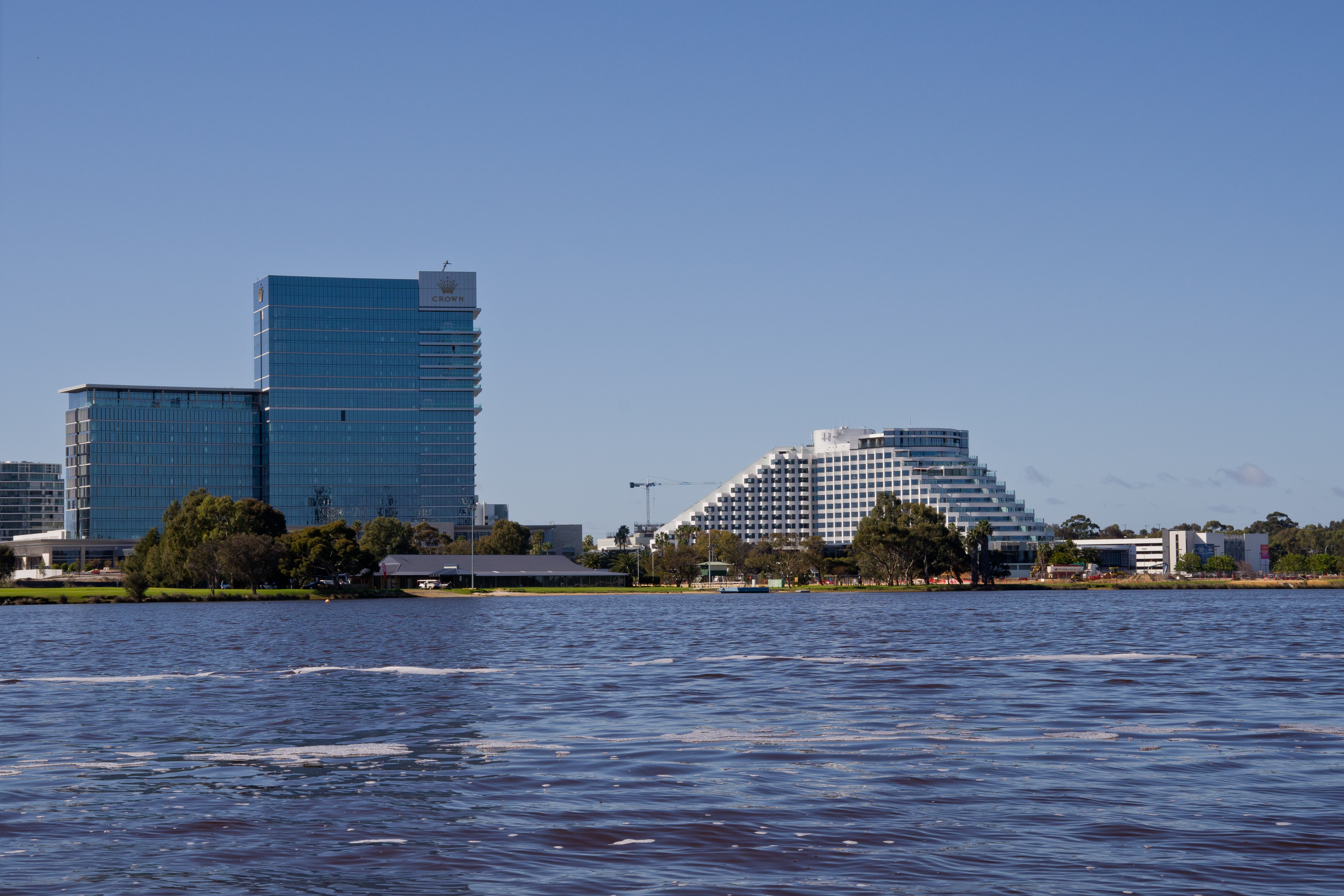
- Crown Perth is a large casino resort development located in Burswood
- Interactive map of Burswood
- Coordinates: 31.964°S 115.894°E
- Country: Australia
- State: Western Australia
- City: Perth
- LGA: Town of Victoria Park
- Location: 3 km (1.9 mi) from the Perth CBD
- Established: 1890s

Government
  - State electorates: Belmont; Victoria Park
  - Federal division: Swan

Area
  - Total: 3.4 km^{2} (1.3 sq mi)

Population
  - Total: 2,779 (SAL 2021)
- Postcode: 6100
Suburbs around Burswood
(Swan River)	(Swan River)	Maylands
East Perth	Burswood	Rivervale
Victoria Park	Victoria Park	Lathlain

Burswood is an inner southeastern suburb of Perth, Western Australia, located immediately across the Swan River from Perth's central business district (CBD). Its local government area is the Town of Victoria Park. Burswood is the location of the State Tennis Centre, Perth Stadium, Belmont Park Racecourse, the Crown Perth casino and resort complex, and the future Perth Park sports and entertainment precinct and street circuit.

== History ==
Burswood developed as two separate entities – Burswood Island, and a southernmost part within the suburb of Victoria Park until the 1990s.

Henry Camfield, who emigrated from England to the Swan River Colony in 1829, with two indentured servants and their families, was granted 1,000 acres (4.0 km^{2}) of land opposite Claisebrook. Camfield named the estate after his father's farm, Burrswood, near Groombridge in Kent.

The area was a low-lying peninsula leading to a ridge and steep, sandy hill with scrubland beyond. The peninsula became Burrswood Island in 1841 when Burswood canal was cut to offer a more direct route to Guildford, which had previously been encumbered by mud flats. By this time, the land was earning income and Camfield let it to tenants until he sold it in 1871 when he was living at Camfield House. A statue of Henry Camfield is located in Burswood Park surrounding the entertainment complex today.

During the 1890s, the Bunbury Bridge and the Perth to Armadale railway line were built in the area. The current spelling of Burswood was a result of a misspelling on the station signage. Western Australia's first golf course (9-hole) was built at Burswood Island in 1895. The site was found to be unsuitable and the course was closed and the site abandoned. In 1899, a racecourse was built by Albert Edmund Cockram and in 1902 it became the Belmont Park Racecourse. In 1906 Goodwood railway station, later renamed Belmont Park, opened.

From 1900 until 1943, there were two racecourses, Goodwood and Belmont Park. These were owned by Albert Edmund Cockram, as was Burswood Island. He developed the racecourses and became the largest importer of thoroughbreds into Australia. The Western Australian Turf Club took over both in 1945, purchasing it from the estate of Albert Edmund Cockram, and closed Goodwood.

Efforts were made to establish a residential district at "Riversdale Estate", but the use of Burswood Island as part of a sewerage filtration system (1906–1934) and the existence of various light industries from the 1910s onward worked against development. Residents in the area requested a change of name and in 1921, the name Rivervale was adopted.

In 1985, the development of the Burswood Island Resort, including a casino, rehabilitated the name and the suburb was gazetted as Burswood in 1993, also including the residential area of Victoria Park south of Burswood Road. The resort is now known as Crown Perth.

A new 18-hole golf course was opened in 1987; it closed in 2013 to make way for construction of Perth Stadium and a new hotel. The Burswood Dome, a 13,600 seat multipurpose indoor arena used for sports and entertainment, operated from 1987 to 2012. It was demolished in 2013, to be replaced by a casino carpark.

In February 2026, initial works for Perth Park, a sports and entertainment precinct based around a street circuit, began.

== Population ==
In the 2021 Census, there were 2,779 people in Burswood. 47.0% of people were born in Australia. The next most common country of birth was England at 6.1%. 63.0% of people spoke only English at home. Other languages spoken at home included Mandarin at 6.2%. The most common responses for religion were No Religion 41.2% and Catholic 18.8%.

Notably 8.8% of Burswood's population has Chinese ancestry, well above the state or national averages.

== Geography ==
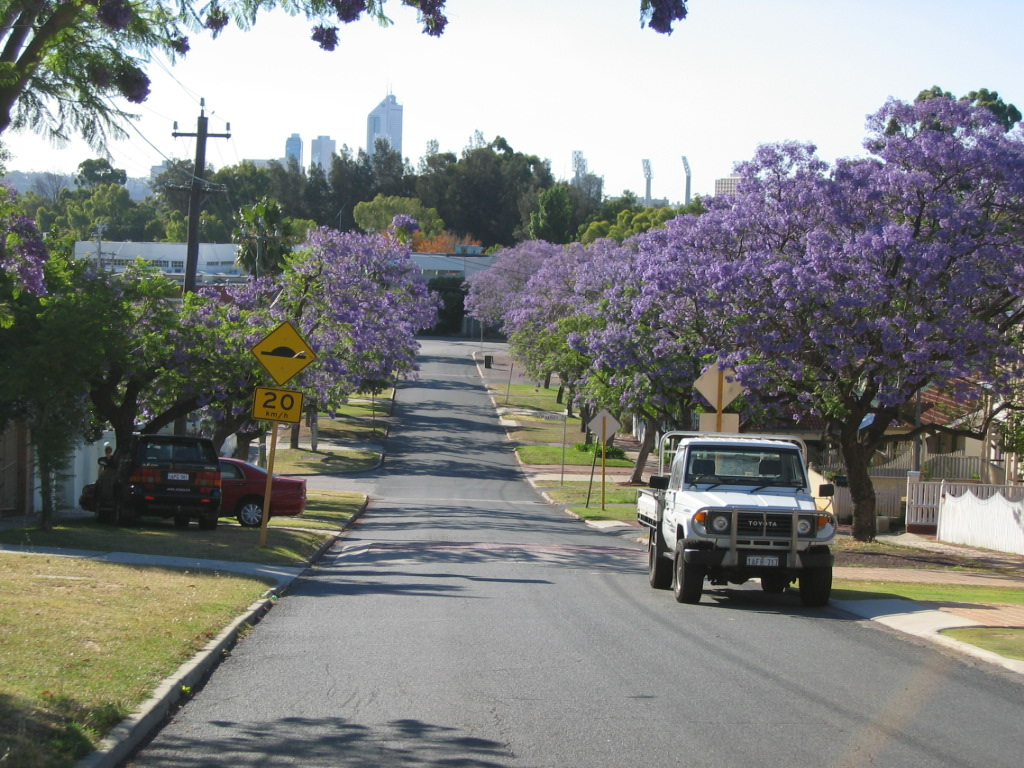
Jacaranda-lined Howick Street, with the CBD in background

Burswood is bounded by the Swan River to the west, north and north-east; Graham Farmer Freeway, Great Eastern Highway and the Armadale railway to the east, and Shepperton Road and Harper Street to the south.

== Facilities ==
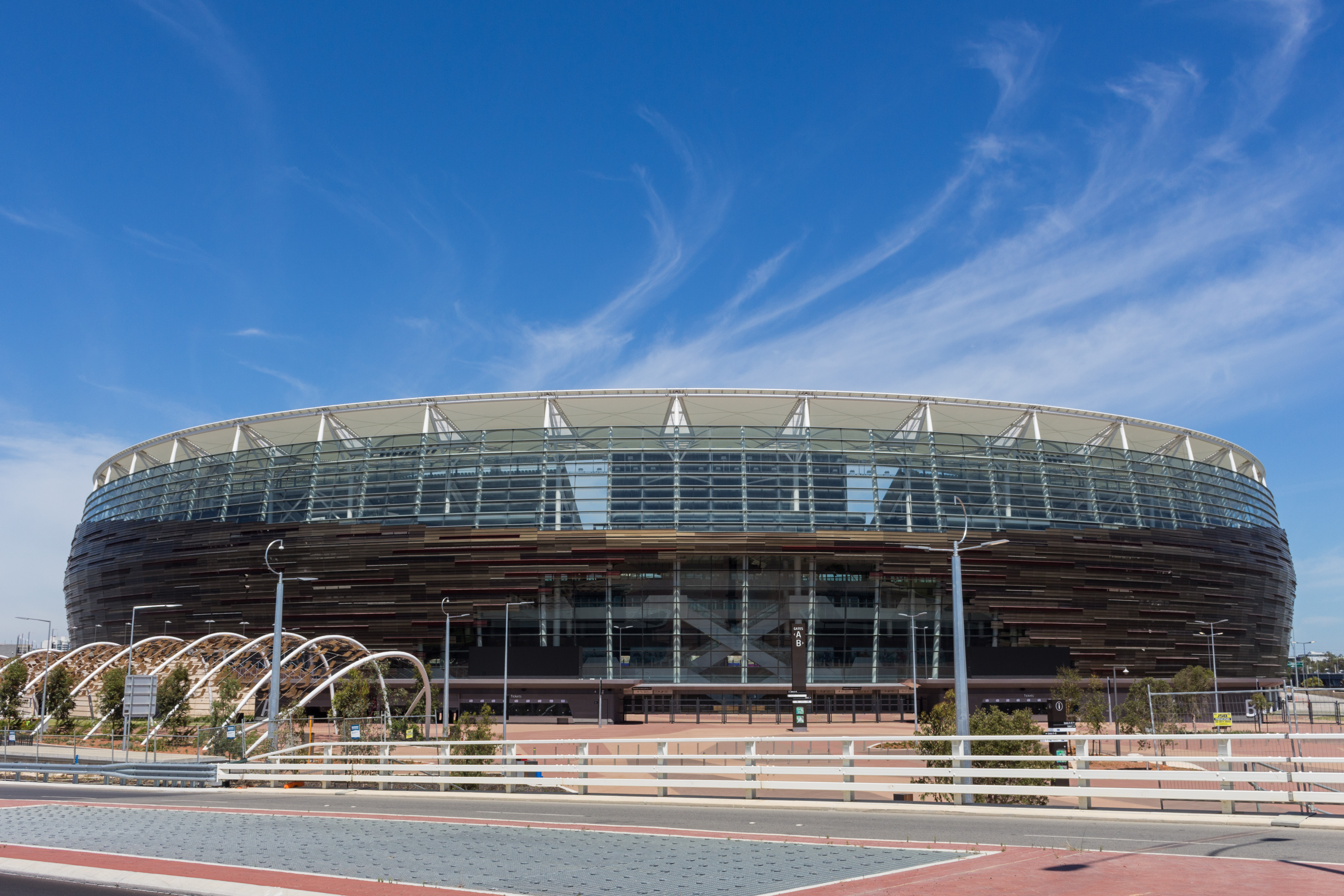
Perth Stadium opened in January 2018

Burswood includes Belmont Park Racecourse, Perth's winter thoroughbred racing track; Perth Stadium, a 60,000 seat multi-purpose venue for all football codes, cricket and entertainment events; the State Tennis Centre; and Crown Perth, with three hotels, a casino, a convention and function centre, a theatre and many restaurants and bars. Perth Stadium will host the opening match of the 2027 Rugby World Cup.

A large park, Burswood Park, lies adjacent to the Crown Perth resort and contains wildflower displays and a number of public sculptures. A significant section of Burswood Park north of the resort will be redeveloped into the Perth Park sports precinct and street circuit.

== Transport ==
The Perth-Armadale rail line runs through the area and is serviced by Burswood railway station. Buses from the Victoria Park transfer station along Great Eastern Highway and Craig Street service the area. Perth Stadium is serviced by the Perth Stadium railway station, with the Perth Stadium bus station operating on event days. All services are operated by the Public Transport Authority. except the privately-owned Little Ferry Co.

=== Bus ===
==== Bus stations ====
- Causeway Bus Station
- Perth Stadium Bus Station (special events only)

==== Bus routes ====
- 38 Perth Busport to Cloverdale – serves Causeway Bus Station and Shepperton Road
- 39 Elizabeth Quay Bus Station to Redcliffe Station – serves Causeway Bus Station, Craig Street and Great Eastern Highway
- 270 Elizabeth Quay Bus Station to High Wycombe Station – serves Causeway Bus Station, Craig Street and Great Eastern Highway
- 930 Elizabeth Quay Bus Station to Thornlie Station (high frequency) – serves Causeway Bus Station and Shepperton Road
- 930X Elizabeth Quay Bus Station to Thornlie Station (high frequency/limited stops) – serves Causeway Bus Station and Shepperton Road
- 935 Kings Park to Redcliffe Station (high frequency) – serves Causeway Bus Station, Craig Street and Great Eastern Highway
- 940 Elizabeth Quay Bus Station to Redcliffe Station (high frequency) – serves Causeway Bus Station, Craig Street and Great Eastern Highway

Bus routes serving Causeway Bus Station:

- 32 Elizabeth Quay Bus Station to Como
- 33 Elizabeth Quay Bus Station to Curtin Central Bus Station
- 72 and 177 Elizabeth Quay Bus Station to Cannington Station
- 73 Elizabeth Quay Bus Station to Ranford Road Station
- 176 Elizabeth Quay Bus Station to Oats Street Station
- 178 and 179 Elizabeth Quay Bus Station to Bull Creek Station
- 220 Perth Busport to Armadale Station
- 910 Perth Busport to Fremantle Station (high frequency)
- 960 Mirrabooka Bus Station to Curtin University Bus Station (high frequency)

=== Rail ===
- Armadale Line
- Thornlie-Cockburn Line
  - Perth Stadium railway station
  - Burswood railway station
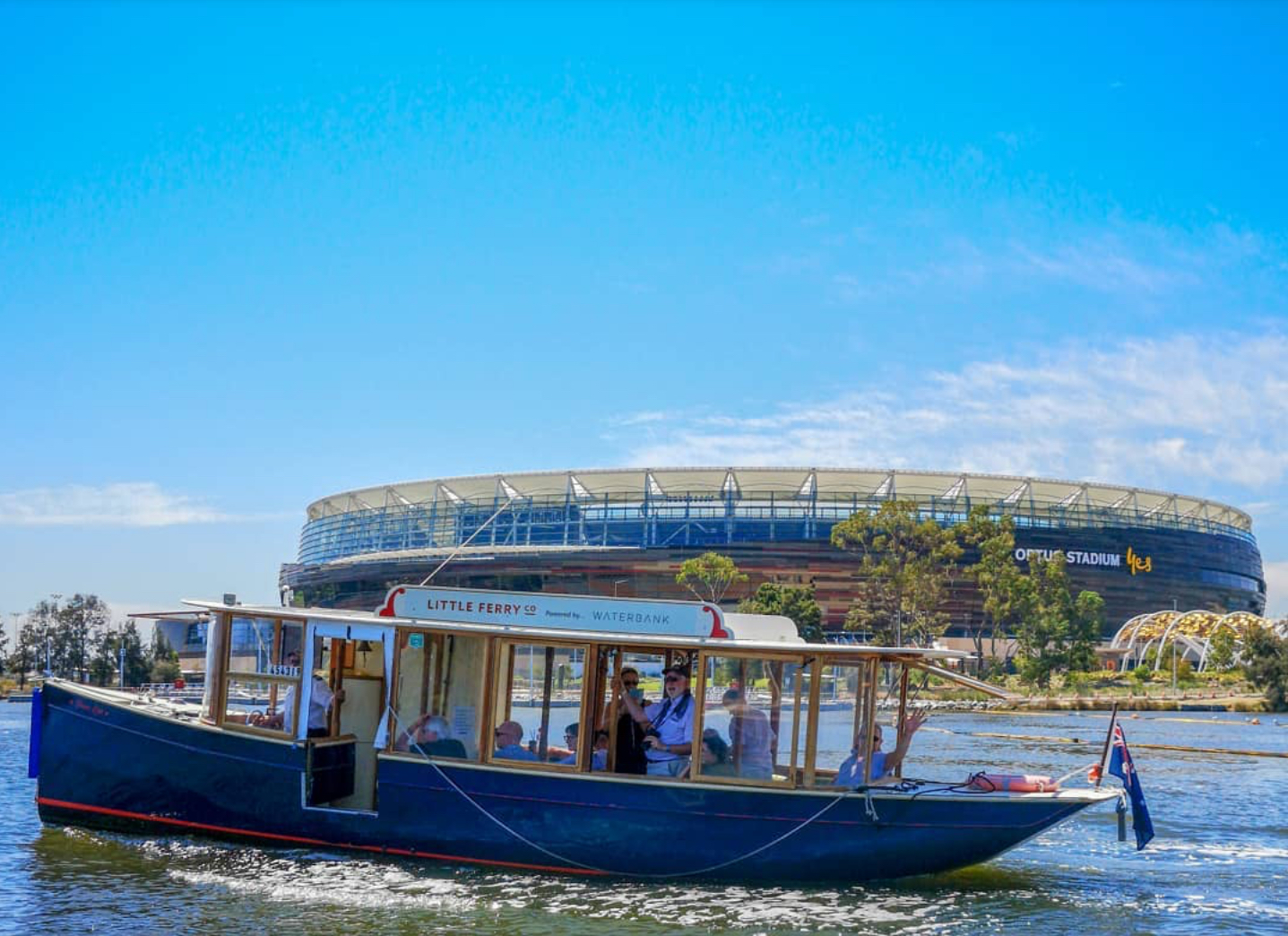
    The Little Ferry outside Optus stadium

=== Ferry ===
- The Little Ferry Co. Burswood jetty to Elizabeth Quay via On The Point. Departs Wednesday–Sunday at 10:45 am, 12:45 pm, and 2:45 pm

== Politics ==
The nearest polling booth, Homestead Seniors Centre in Victoria Park, is marginal at federal level, and supports the Australian Labor Party at state elections.

2022 federal election Source: AEC
Labor	40.73%
Liberal	27.92%
Greens	19.90%
United Australia Party	2.61%
Animal Justice Party	1.99%

2010 federal election Source: AEC
Liberal	46.5%
Labor	35.6%
Greens	12.9%
CDP	1.93%
Family First	0.61%

2007 federal election Source: AEC
Liberal	43.1%
Labor	41.4%
Greens	11.8%
CDP	1.22%
One Nation	0.61%

2004 federal election Source: AEC
Liberal	42.4%
Labor	39.6%
Greens	9.90%
Democrats	2.29%
One Nation	1.60%

2001 federal election Source: AEC
Labor	39.9%
Liberal	38.6%
Democrats	7.76%
Greens	6.59%
One Nation	4.27%

2008 state election Source: WAEC
Labor	43.0%
Liberal	40.0%
Greens	13.9%
CDP	1.57%
Family First	1.44%

2005 state election Source: WAEC
Labor	55.0%
Liberal	30.7%
Greens	9.18%
CDP	2.87%
One Nation	2.76%

2001 state election Source: WAEC
Labor	48.1%
Liberal	29.5%
Greens	8.68%
One Nation	6.35%
Democrats	4.75%

1996 state election Source: WAEC
Labor	47.0%
Liberal	36.6%
Greens	7.22%
Democrats	5.41%
Independent	3.78%
