= Camfield =

Camfield is a surname. Notable people with the surname include:

- Anne Camfield (1808–1896), Australian photographer, pioneer teacher and headmistress
- Bill Camfield (1929–1991), American television personality
- Douglas Camfield (1931–1984), British television director

== See also ==
- Camfield (biogeographic region), see Interim Biogeographic Regionalisation for Australia#O
- Camfield River, Australia
- Camfield Station, in the Northern Territory of Australia
