= Crown Perth =

Resort and casino in Burswood, Western Australia

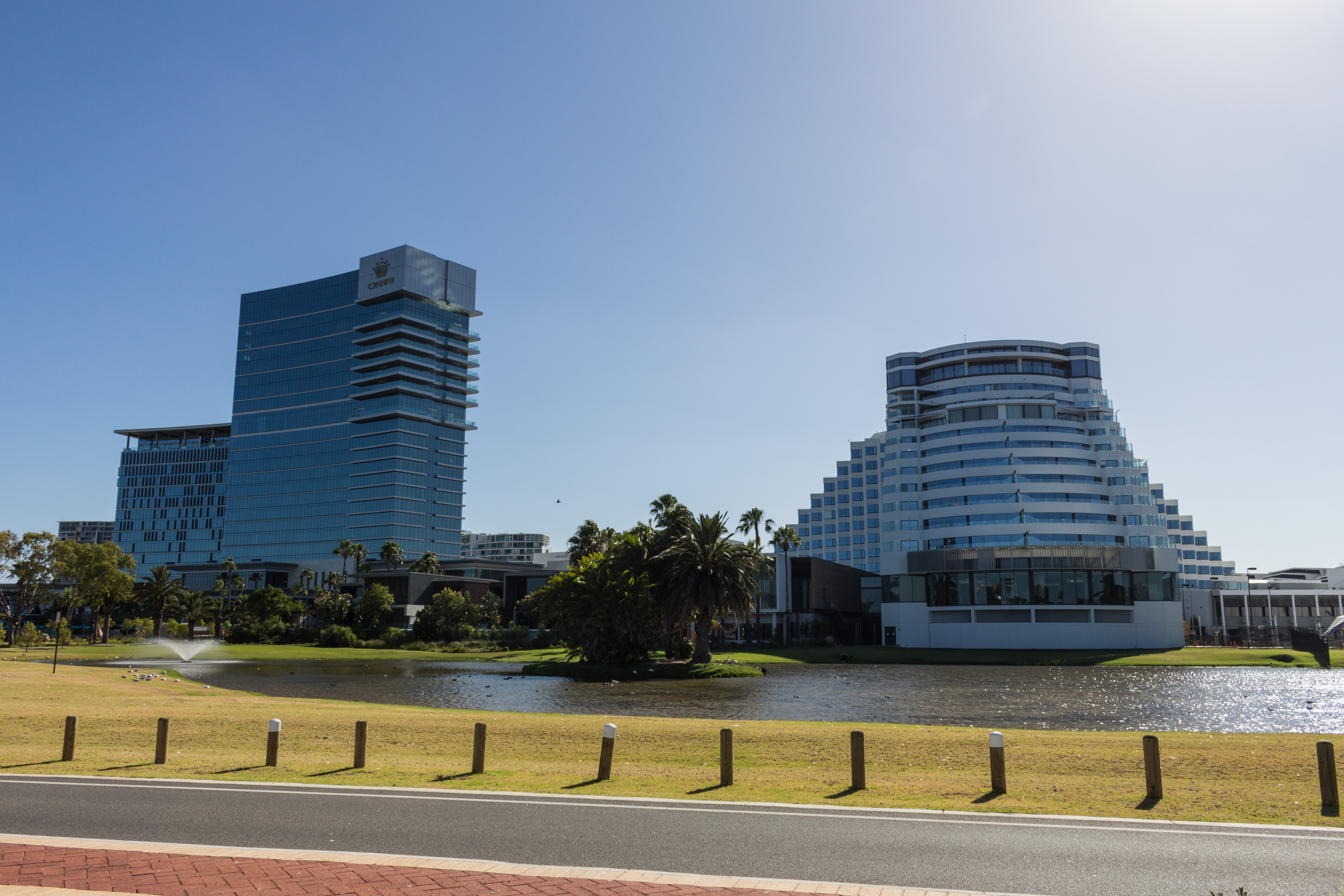
- The Crown Perth complex
- Interactive map of Crown Perth
- Location: Perth, Western Australia; Great Eastern Highway Burswood WA 6100 Australia; 31°57′39″S 115°53′44″E
- Opened: 30 December 1985; 40 years ago
- No. of rooms: 1,196
- Casino type: Land-based
- Owner: Crown Resorts Limited
- Previous names: Burswood Island Casino (1985–87); Burswood Island Complex (1987–99); Burswood Entertainment Complex (1999–2011)
- Renovated in: 1990, 1999, 2002, 2012
- Building details
- Hotel chain: Crown Metropol Perth; Crown Promenade Perth; Crown Towers Perth

General information
- Cost: A$200 million
- Renovation cost: A$96 million (2002 renovations); A$750 million (2012 renovations)

Other information
- Seating capacity: 2,300 (Crown Theatre Perth); 1,800 (Grand Ballroom at Crown Perth); 830 (The Astral)
- Number of restaurants: 32

Website
- www.crownperth.com.au

Crown Perth (formerly Burswood Island Casino, Burswood Island Complex and Burswood Entertainment Complex) is a resort and casino located in Burswood, Western Australia, near the Swan River. The resort consists of a casino, a convention centre with meeting rooms, a theatre and two ballrooms along with over thirty restaurants and bars, a nightclub and recreational facilities. It also features three hotels: the 405-room Crown Metropol Perth, the 291-room Crown Promenade Perth and the 500-room luxury hotel Crown Towers Perth, which was opened in December 2016. The Crown Perth is one of three Crown Resorts located in capital cities across the country.

== History ==
=== 1980s ===
In 1984, the Government of Western Australia proposed, at the suggestion of Perth businessman Dallas Dempster, that a casino complex be constructed at Burswood Island on the Swan River, 3 kilometres (2 mi) east of the Perth central business district. This was the site of a large landfill facility, which posed difficulties in the proposal, design and construction phases due to the risk of subsidence resulting from decomposition and also the risk of release of effluent into the adjacent river as a result of pile driving for the construction. The winning bidder to build the complex was Tileska Pty Ltd, a joint venture between Dallas Dempster and Genting Berhad, a Malaysian casino operator.

At the time, there were allegations by rival bidders of misconduct against Dempster and Premier of Western Australia Brian Burke, but, after a thorough investigation of these accusations, the WA Inc Royal Commission found no impropriety in that regard. This consortium planned a two-stage construction.

The first stage was initially expected to cost $200 million, and involved futuristic-looking buildings comprising a 135-table casino, 400-room hotel, 18-hole golf course, convention and exhibition centre, tennis courts, amphitheatre and other amenities, together with a beautification of the Burswood Island area. The second stage of the plan involved the $100m construction of another hotel on the site, but no time schedule was set for this and the second hotel was not constructed until two decades later. The Tileska joint venture took up 60% of the capital in the Burswood Property Trust, which was to own the complex. Genting would run the resort, having experience operating casinos in Malaysia's Genting Highlands.

Construction of the resort was approved by the Western Australian Parliament in March 1985 in the Casino (Burswood Island) Agreement Act 1985. It was hoped that the hotel-casino complex would be ready in time for the 1987 America's Cup race, to be hosted by Perth, and construction was to a tight schedule to achieve that deadline. The Burswood Property Trust was listed on the Australian Securities Exchange on 30 May 1985. When it opened on 30 December 1985, Burswood Island Casino (as it was then known) was the largest in Australia, and third-largest in the world. It was expected to receive two to three million visitors per year and have an annual gross profit of $100m. The public interest in the casino proved so much in its early months of operation that it posted a gross profit of $1 million per day for its first two months, far outstripping expectations. In its early weeks of opening, people were reportedly forced to queue at the entrance for hours as the gaming floor was at its full legal capacity.

The Burswood Island Casino was opened several months ahead of schedule, and the other parts of Stage 1 (including the hotel, conference centre, theatre and indoor stadium) remained under construction throughout 1986 and much of 1987. By January 1987, the complex recorded its three millionth visitor. Not sharing in this financial success, the Burswood Property Trust encountered financial difficulties and sold the hotel operations in the under-construction Burswood Island Hotel to Japanese investor Brisney Pty Ltd, a joint venture between investment company Yunan Development Co Ltd and hotel operator Kanematsu Trading Co Ltd. On 28 August 1987, the Burswood Dome indoor sports stadium was opened to the public, and was noted as being by far the largest auditorium in the southern hemisphere.

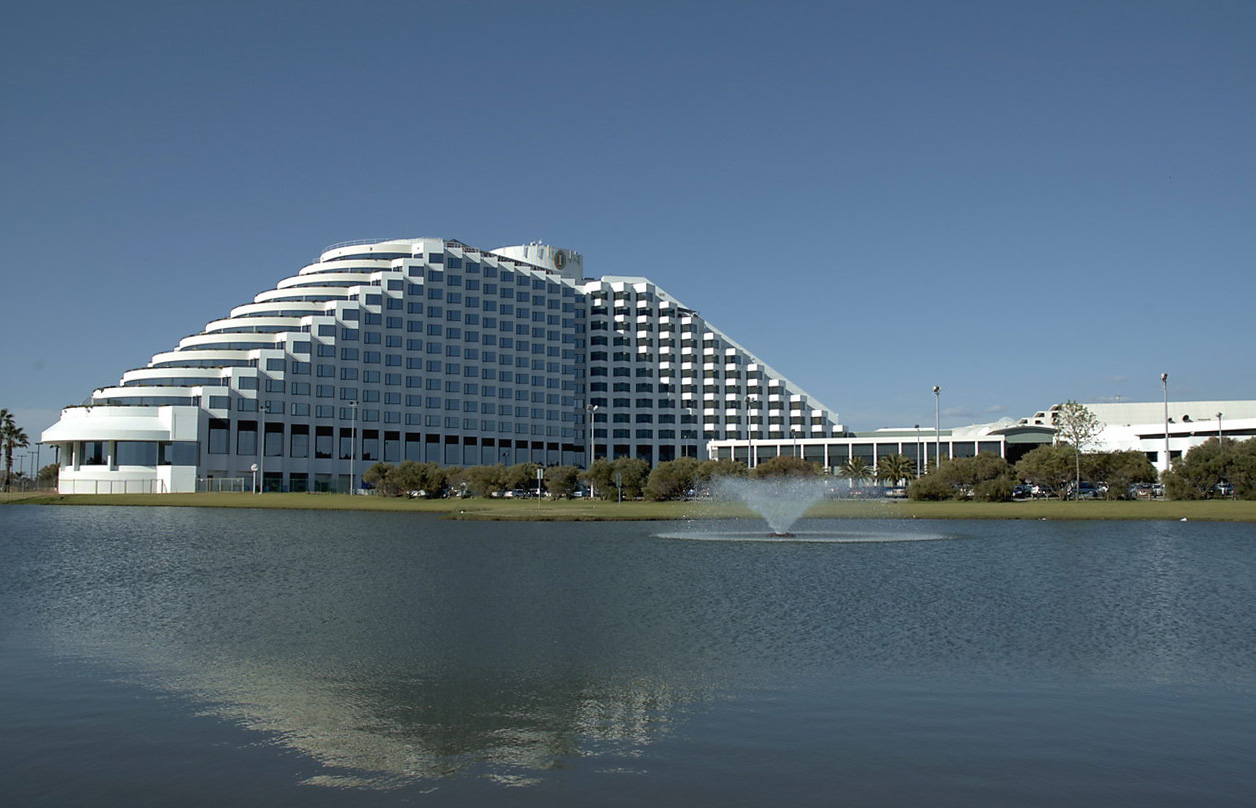
Crown Metropol, which opened as the Burswood Island Hotel in 1987

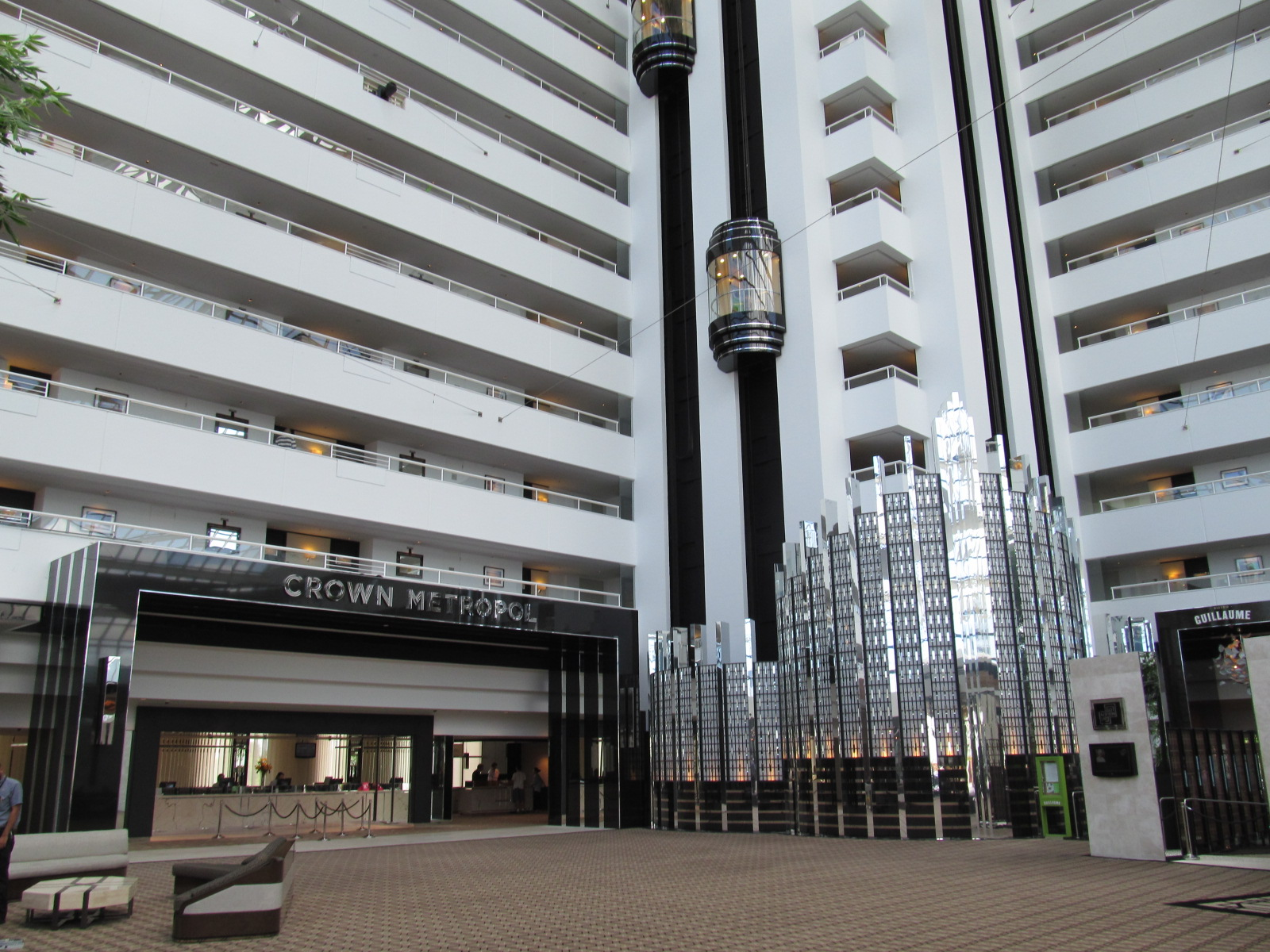
The foyer of Crown Metropol after the hotel's rebranding in 2012

The hotel's opening was delayed by 85 days, largely as a result of inclement weather and industrial disputes. This delay meant that the hotel and conference centre was not available during the early stages of the America's Cup race, necessitating refunds to overseas visitors. Although the 417-room Burswood Island Hotel opened its doors to the public on 4 October 1987, the hotel's management reportedly allowed one of the casino's highest rollers to stay there a day early, during which time he won $1.4 million, which was believed at the time to be the highest amount ever won by an individual in an Australian casino.

The Burswood Convention Centre was opened on 20 November 1987, and on 8 April 1988, the entire Burswood Island complex had its official opening.

=== 1990s ===
The casino was expanded in 1990, and an improved International Room (for high-rolling punters) was unveiled in 1995. 1998 saw the corporatization of the Burswood Property Trust, and also saw the complete renovation of the Burswood Theatre. In 1999, the management of Burswood undertook an extensive refurbishment program of the hotel rooms.

In 1996, singer Michael Jackson performed three sold-out shows at Burswood Dome on 30 November, 2 and 4 December, as part of his HIStory World Tour in front of 60,000 attendees.

=== 2000s ===
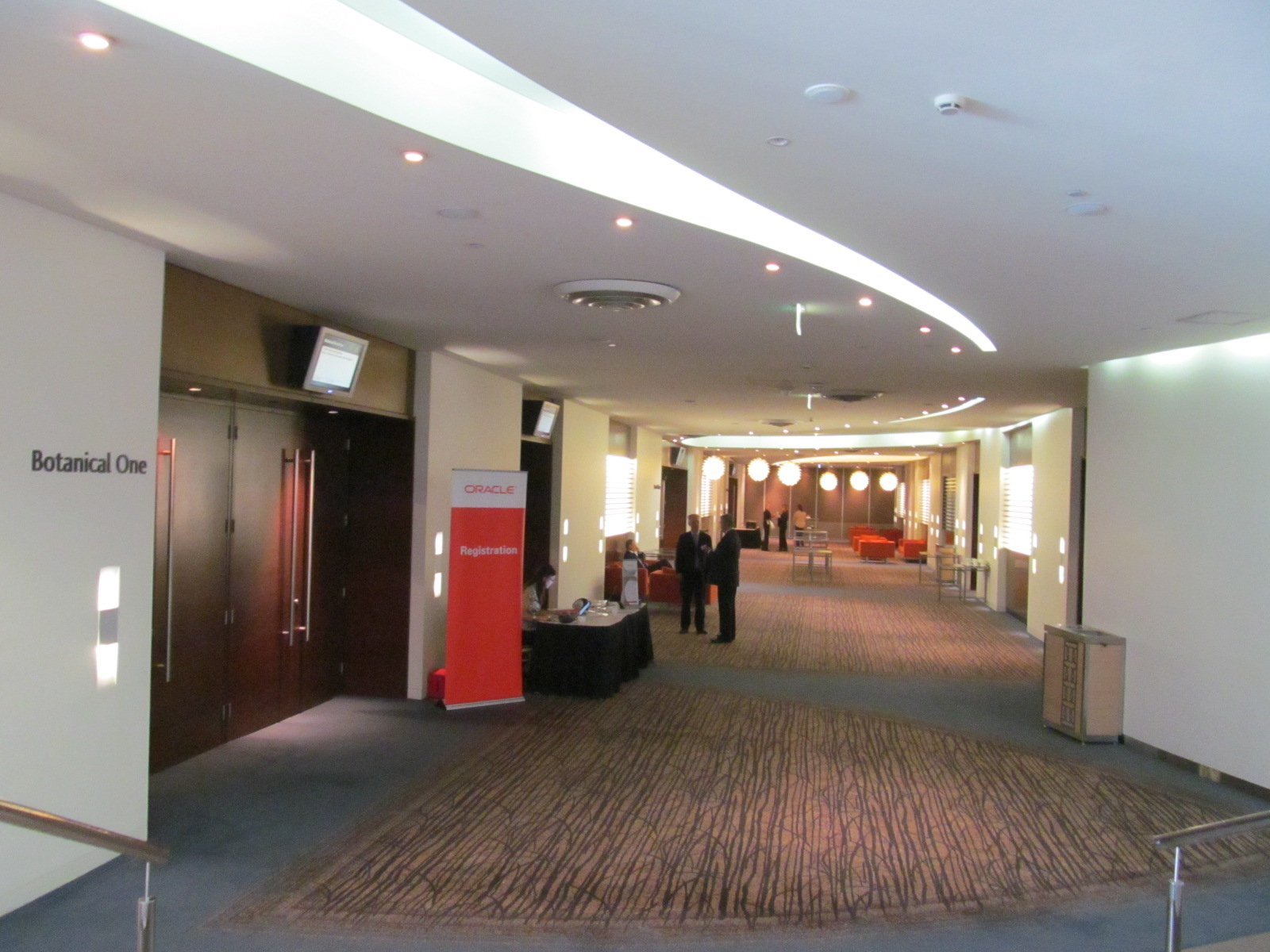
The foyer of the resort's convention centre

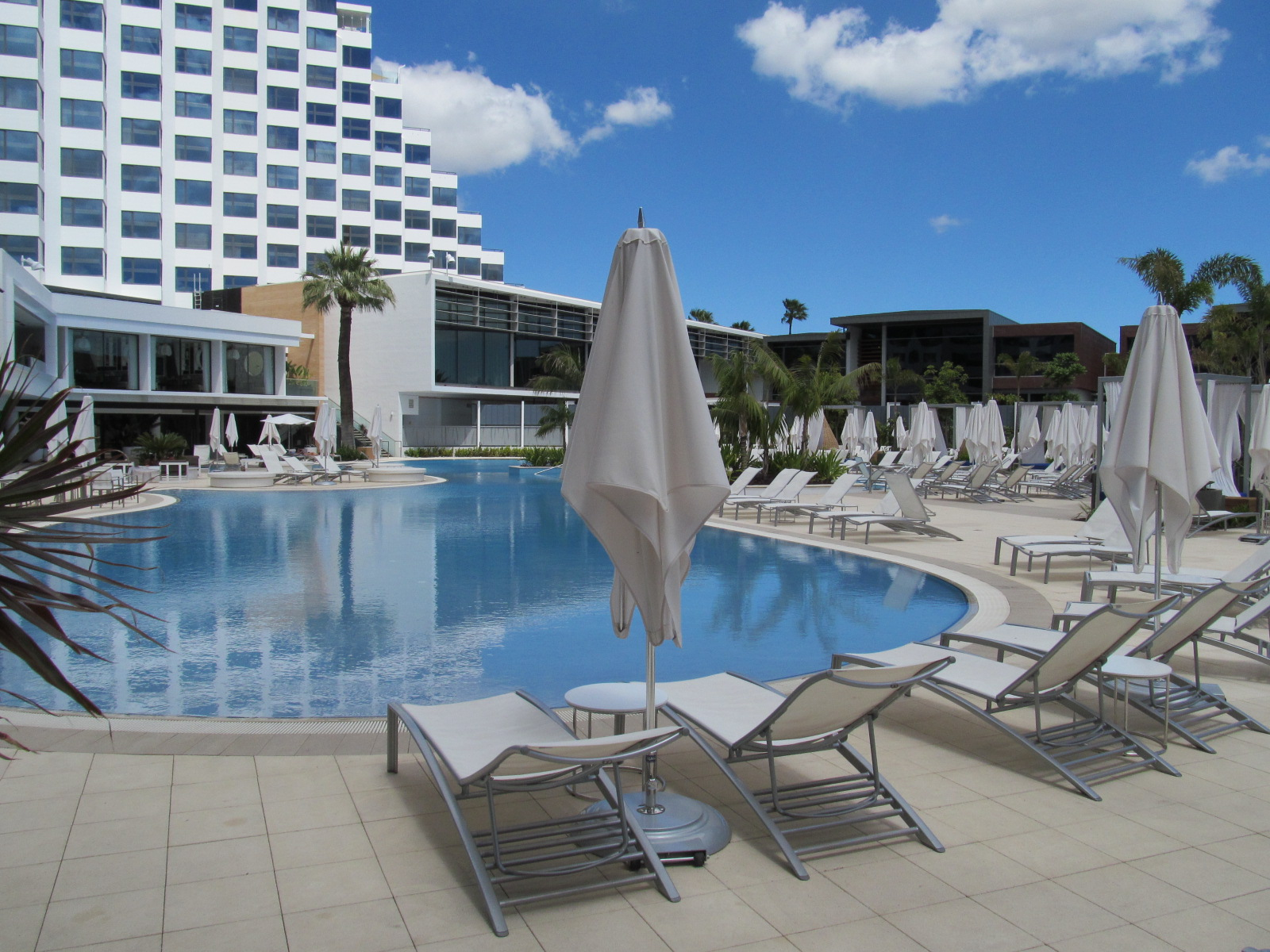
Pool at the resort

In 2000, a $96 million resort renovation and improvement program was undertaken. 2001 and 2002 saw the opening of the Ruby Room nightclub and Champion's Bar, both within the casino, and also the opening of the Grand Ballroom. In 2003, Burswood entered into a deal with land developer Mirvac Fini for the residential development of vacant land between the complex and the Graham Farmer Freeway. Picking up from the long-neglected Stage 2 of the Burswood development plan, in the early 2000s the management of Burswood made various plans to build a second hotel on the site. Eventually, in 2003 they entered into a joint venture deal with the InterContinental Hotels Group to run the existing Burswood Resort Hotel (to be re-branded as Burswood InterContinental Hotel) and a new, 291-room Holiday Inn hotel to be constructed adjacent to the Burswood Theatre. In 2004, Publishing and Broadcasting Limited, whose principal shareholder was Kerry Packer, acquired full control of the Burswood International Resort Casino, and in 2005 re-branded the site as "Burswood Entertainment Complex". On 1 August 2005, the Holiday Inn Burswood opened for business after 29 months of construction. Construction finished three months early and was A$2 million under budget. The promoters proclaimed that it was "Perth's first purpose-built hotel in more than 12 years".

In 2006, Burswood closed its renowned fine-dining Windows Restaurant to make way for a newer, expanded VIP room for high rollers. This new facility, called The Pearl Room, opened in late 2006 featuring 180-degree Swan River views. It replaced the old International Room, which closed its doors following the unveiling of The Pearl Room. In 2007 Publishing and Broadcasting Limited vested its gaming interests, which included Burswood, into Crown Limited, a company controlled by James Packer, the son and heir of Kerry Packer, who died in December 2005. Also in 2007 Burswood opened The Meridian Room – a new gaming room featuring higher stakes open to the general public. The Meridian Room is located at the site of the old International Room, and has been refurbished to feature a contemporary design. MINQ, an exclusive late night bar, accessible only by a hosted lift at the entrance of The Meridian Room, opened in August 2007. Carbon Sports Bar opened in December 2007 and features a giant 12.5 m × 4 m (41 ft × 13 ft) wide screen and 410 mm × 1,320 mm (16 in × 52 in) plasmas. In December 2008, Burswood opened its new world-class dedicated poker room featuring plasma screens, dedicated bar and lounge area. In November 2009, Britney Spears performed two shows at the arena for her highly anticipated The Circus Starring Britney Spears tour. The shows at Burswood were Spears' first concerts in Australia. She was originally supposed to perform five shows in Australia during her 2004 Onyx Hotel Tour (including one at the Burswood Dome), but the shows were cancelled after Spears injured her knee while filming her video "Outrageous". In April 2010 the world-renowned musical Cats performed the first of many shows over a 3-week period at Burswood Theatre.

=== 2010s ===
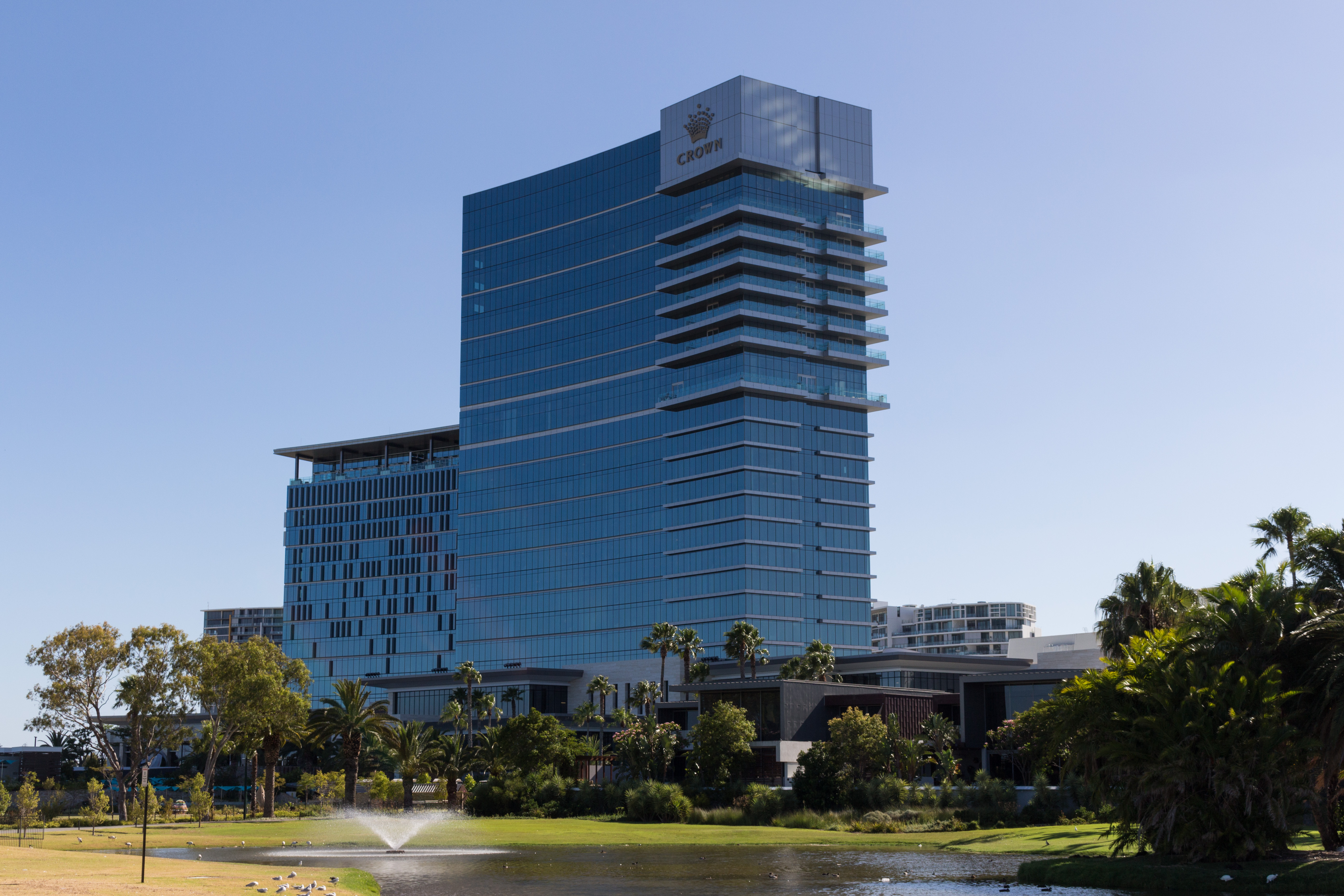
The Crown Towers luxury hotel opened in December 2016

On 14 December 2011, James Packer as the Executive Chairman of Crown Limited announced the re-branding of Burswood Entertainment Complex as Crown Perth. In March 2012 it was confirmed that the hotels on site would also be re-branded in line with sister complex Crown Melbourne upon completion of a $750 million refurbishment. InterContinental Burswood became Crown Metropol Perth from 27 June 2012, while the Holiday Inn Perth Burswood was officially rebranded Crown Promenade on 20 June 2012.

On 1 August 2012 it was revealed a new 500-room "six star" hotel would be built at Burswood at a cost of $568 million. The hotel, Crown Towers, was built by Multiplex and opened in December 2016. It is Perth's largest, taking the casino's hotel capacity to 1,200 rooms. Colin Barnett, the then-premier of Western Australia also made the announcement saying his government was also backing a bid by Crown to increase its number of poker machines by 500, and the number of gaming tables by 130.

=== 2020s ===
In February 2026, the Urban Food District, a new food precinct opened; it is the first major development to open at the resort in more than a decade. The precinct consist of several eateries and bars, and includes outlets from both local brands and international chains such Chatime and Eggslut.

== Casino ==
The casino operates 24 hours, 7 days a week. As of 2012 it is the monopoly casino operator in Perth, Western Australia. Due to state laws prohibiting them, the casino does not feature reel slot machines. Nonetheless it features "electronic gaming machines" (EGMs), many of which are visibly similar to slot machines, but operate within parameters established by state law regarding visual presentation, operation, and pace of play.

The table games include baccarat, mini baccarat, blackjack, roulette, poker (Texas hold'em, Omaha), three card poker, casino war, progressive Texas hold'em, pai gow, money wheel, sic bo and Caribbean stud.

On 1 August 2012, Crown Limited announced it was seeking a "massive" expansion of gambling facilities, increasing the number of poker machines to 2,500 with gaming tables to increase from 220 to 350, an increase of nearly 60%. The Government of Western Australia is backing Crown's application to the state's Gaming and Wagering Commission, and the proposal has the personal support of WA premier Colin Barnett, who described the increase in gambling facilities "as natural growth," and said it was "common sense" for the expansion as it was being made in line with the development of a new six-star hotel in the casino complex.

Crown has entered into an agreement with the state government to build the hotel on land the government will provide for $60 million. The government's agreement not to object to the increase in gambling facilities is part of the deal. Crown Perth is the only venue in Australia's biggest state that is allowed to operate poker machines. In all other Australian states and territories almost every hotel is equipped with poker machines, while licensed clubs packed with poker machines are widespread.

The proposal to upscale gambling facilities is controversial. Independent senator Nick Xenophon said "James Packer knows he has just been handed the gift that will give him hundreds of millions of dollars for years to come." Ian Carter, chief executive of Anglicare WA, told ABC Radio "The Productivity Commission report and a whole range of other reports around this country have clearly highlighted the cost to our community of gaming machines and poker machines."

In July of 2025, the Gaming and Wagering Commission of Western Australia recommended that Crown Perth keep its gaming license after adequate remedial efforts were made to make the casino compliant with government gaming regulations. Crown Resorts had also made changes within their corporate governance to return themselves to good standing within the framework of Australian gaming regulations.

== Incidents ==
During the 2022 ICC Men's T20 World Cup a contractor entered cricket player Virat Kohli' room uninvited, and made a video that was uploaded to a social media platform. Crown Perth issued an apology and terminated the contractor.

== Burswood Park ==
The parklands surrounding the casino is known as Burswood Park. It was originally a rubbish tip, and also the location of a cement works on the eastern side, from the mid-1940s. The construction of the casino complex also saw the parklands regenerated into a public recreational facility in the early 2000s.

The park contains wildflower displays, and a heritage trail with various statues. It also initially featured a public golf course that was closed for redevelopment in 2013, with The Camfield, a large pub and micro brewery built adjacent to Perth Stadium now occupying the site. Over the year a number of community events take place in Burswood Park, including Movies at Burswood with proceeds going to Telethon Perth, and Have a Go Day, an event for over 55s.

In February 2026, the section of Burswood Park north of the resort began redevelopment into a sports and entertainment precinct to be known as Perth Park, which will be centred around a street circuit.

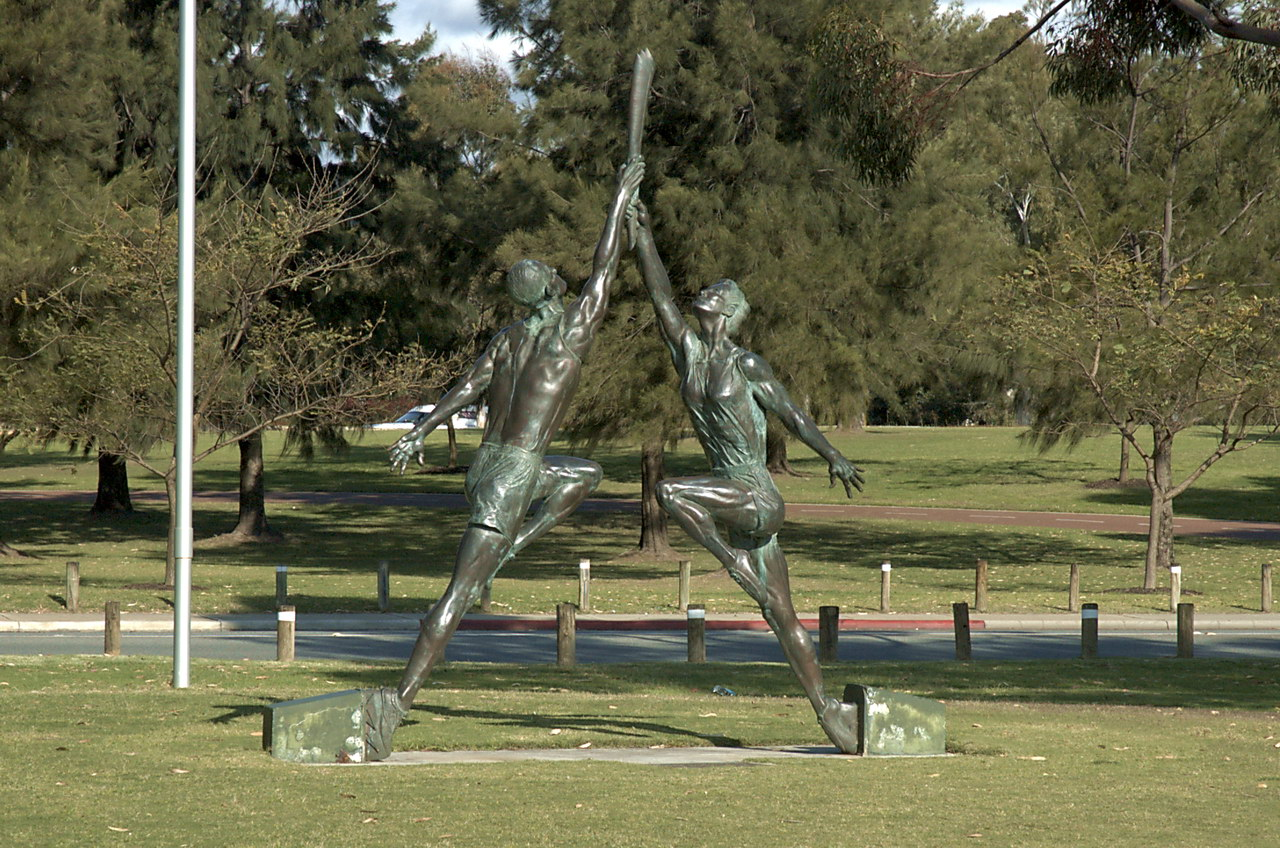
The Olympians

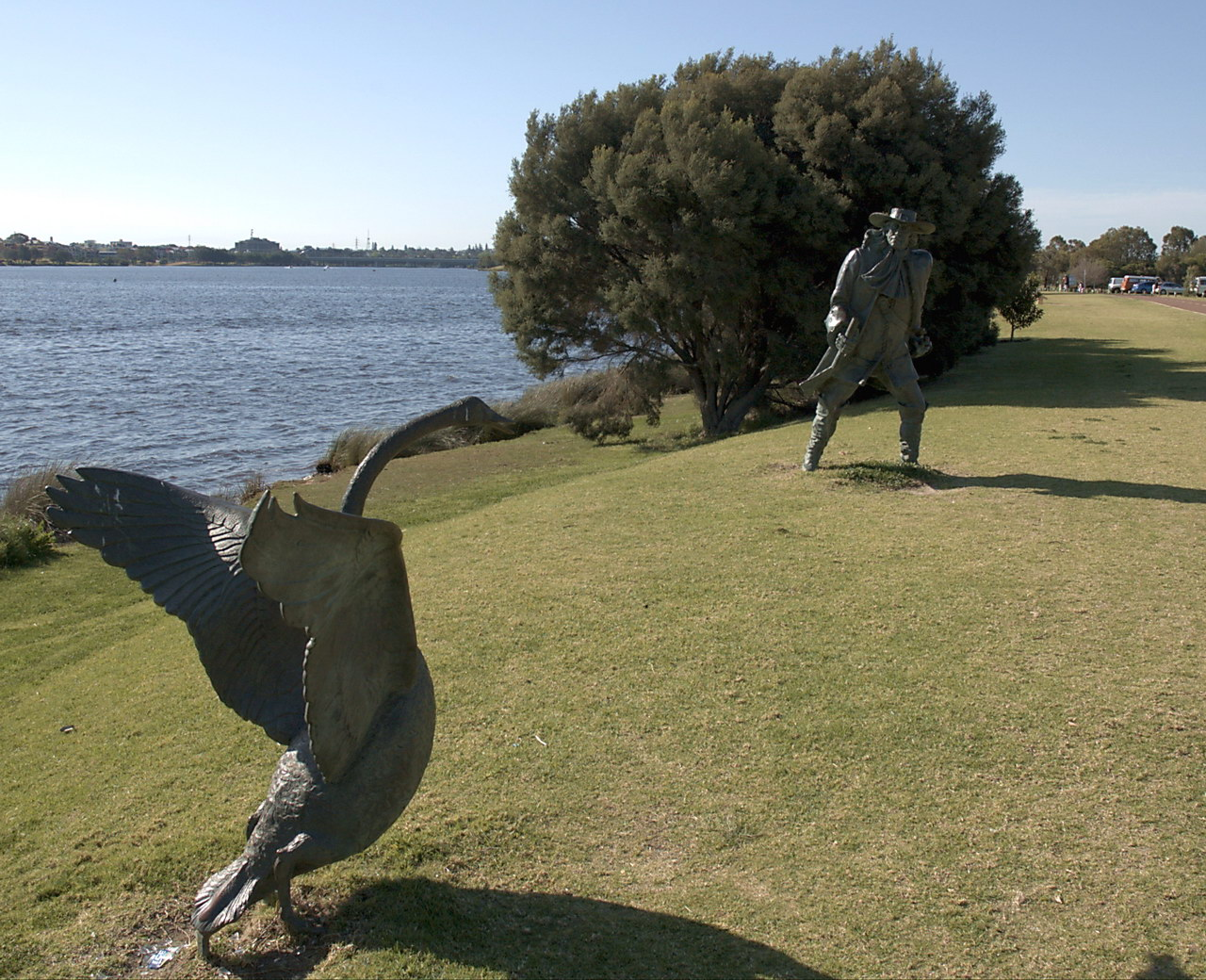
Willem de Vlamingh

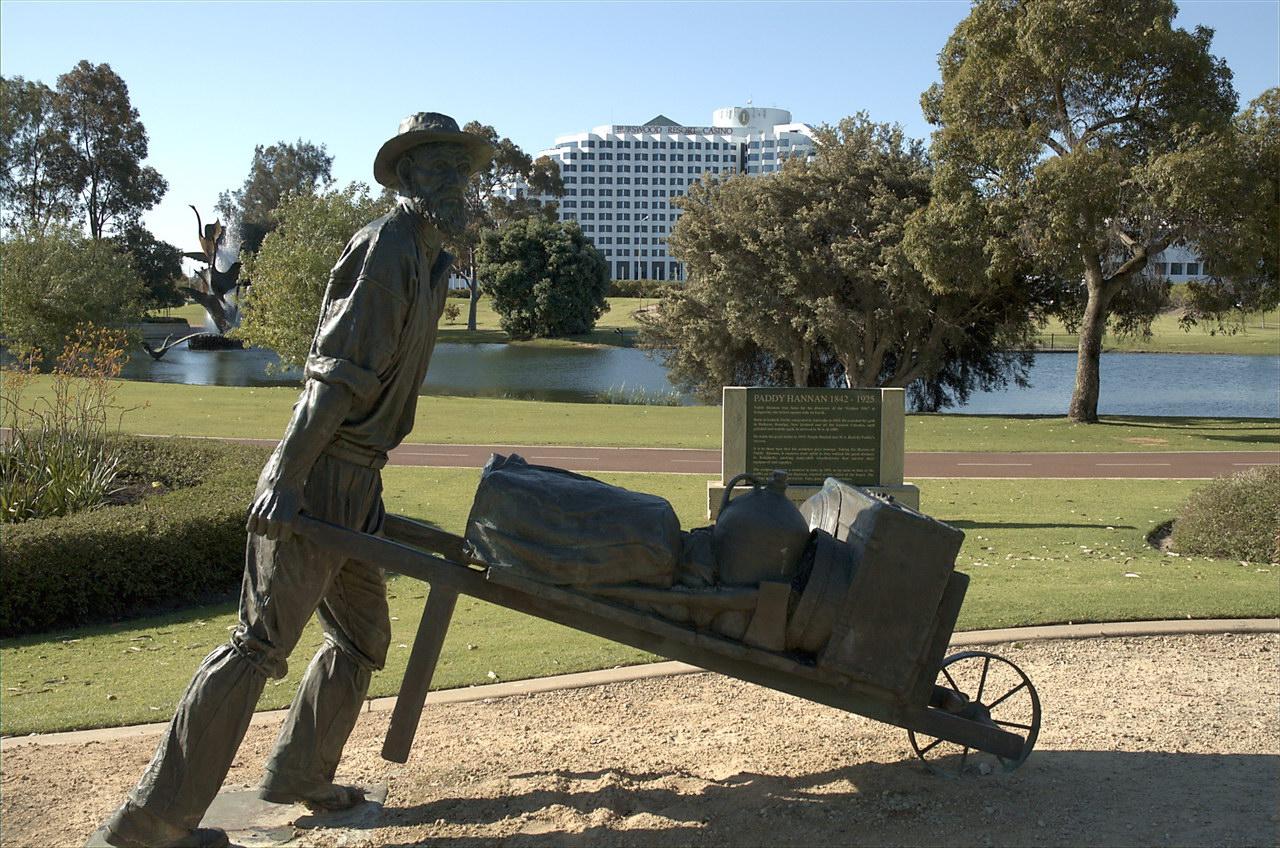
Paddy Hannan

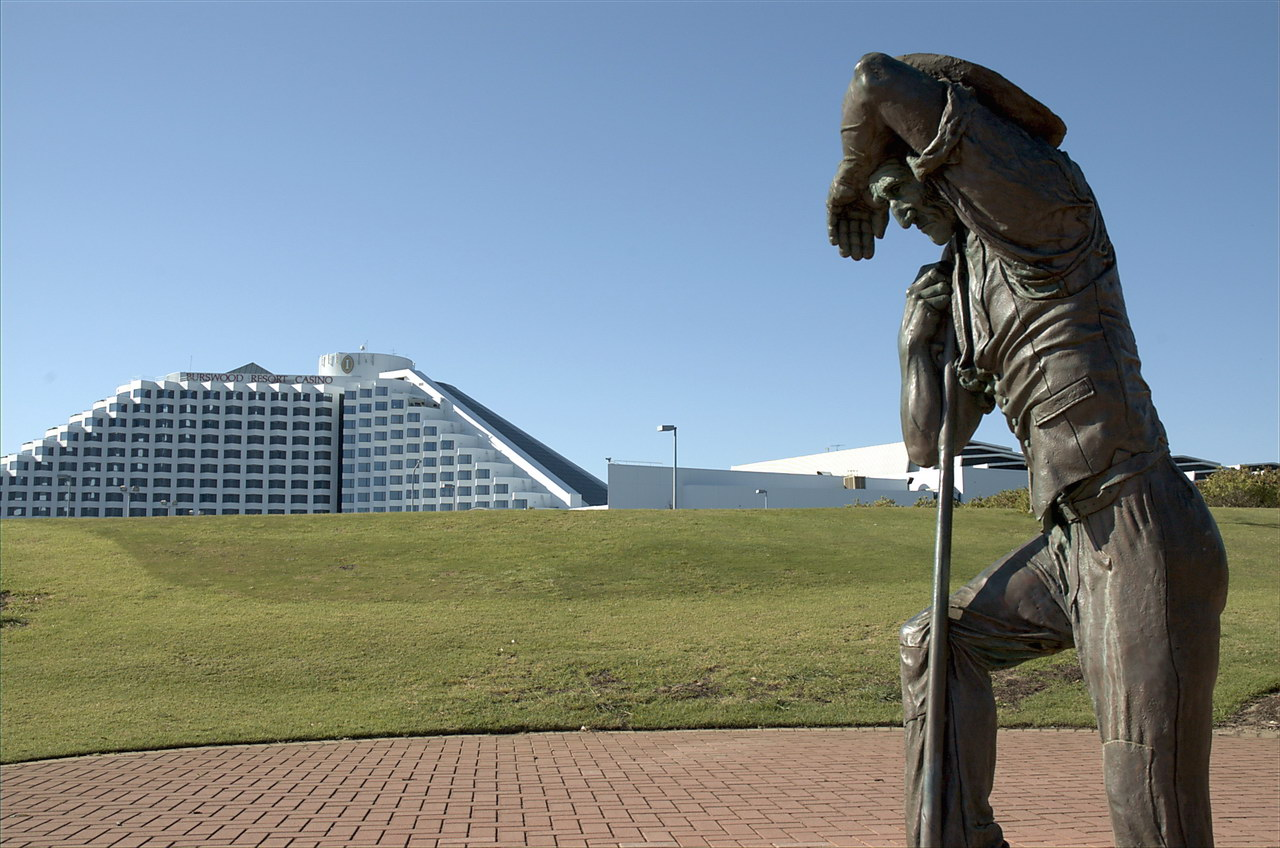
Henry Camfield

== Burswood Dome ==
The Burswood Dome was an arena adjacent to Crown Perth. The arena was demolished to make way for the resort's expansion.

== See also ==
- List of integrated resorts
