= Bessie Flower =

Minang Noongar teacher

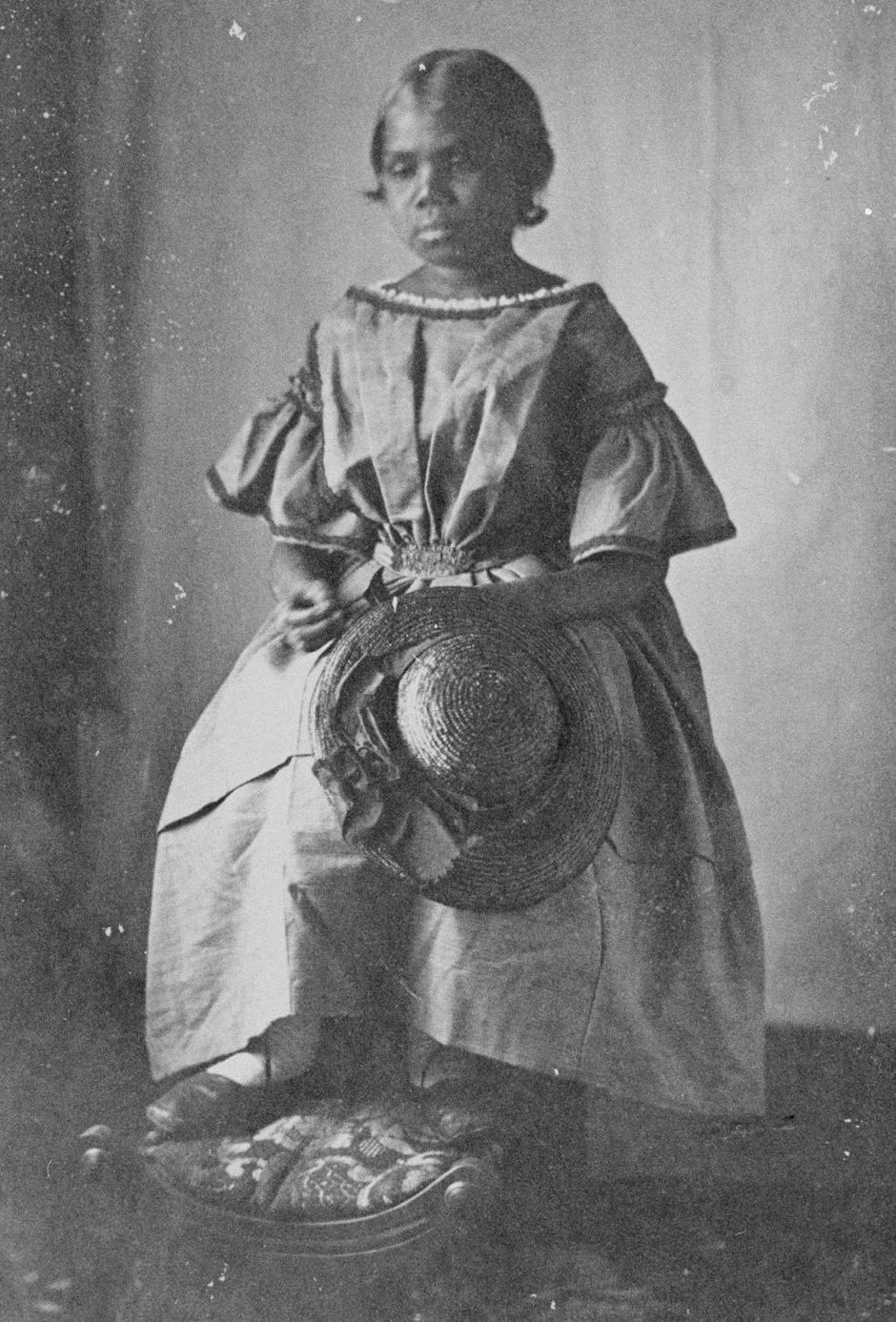
- Portrait of Bessie Flower as a child while at Annesfield.
- Born: Elizabeth Flower c. 1851; King George Sound, Western Australia
- Died: 14 January 1895
- Occupation: Teacher
- Spouse: Donald Cameron

Bessie Flower or Bessie Cameron (c. 1851–1895) was a Minang Noongar woman from Albany, Western Australia. Flower was educated at Annesfield, and developed a strong connection to headmistress Anne Camfield. Throughout her life she fought for Aboriginal rights and to keep families together. In 1867 Flower relocated to the Ramahyuck Mission, in Gippsland, Victoria, where she worked as a teacher.

== Early life and education ==
Flower was born to John and Mary Flower some time near 1851. Her family were Nyungar Aboriginal Australians and her parents worked for Henry and Anne Camfield. Henry was the government's representative and Anne started a school for native children which the Flower children attended. Bessie became a Christian and an outstanding pupil.

Flower was described as an "intelligent and bright child". She spoke French, played the harmonium, chess, and also excelled at the piano and singing. In 1864 she was sent to a Church of England 'model school' to further her studies. Upon returning to Annesfield in 1866, she worked alongside Anne Camfield as a teacher's assistant. Flower also worked as an organist at the local Anglican Church.

In 1871, Flower was mentioned in a Select Committee report on the Aboriginal Natives, which summarised Anne Camfield's evidence saying "One girl, sent to Sydney, played for some time the harmonium in St. Philip’s Church, and gained her living by teaching...".

== Life in Gippsland ==
In 1867, Flower was given an opportunity which appeared to provide her a chance to improve her teaching. She was offered a teaching position at Ramahyuck Mission in Gippsland in Victoria, but the real plan seemed to have been for her to become a wife to one of Friedrich Hagenauer's favourite converts. Bessie's parents were both Aboriginal whereas her husband, Adolph Donald Cameron, was classed as a 'half-caste'. They married when Bessie was 17 and they had eight children. Both Adolph and Bessie left Hagenauer's employment but his influence continued.

In 1886, the government passed legislation that forced Aboriginal people under 34 years of age with non-Aboriginal parentage (so-called 'half-castes') to leave missions. This meant that Bessie and Adolph were separated from their family and forced to move out and live in a hostile settler community. She found, therefore, that the authorities were trying to separate her from her children. The secretary of the board in charge of that decision, as it happened, was Friedrich Hagenauer himself. They were ultimately allowed to return to Ramahyuck Mission, but two of their daughters were forcibly indentured as domestic servants.

For the last years of her life, Bessie lived at Ramahyuck from time to time and continued to try and help her children and other Aboriginal women to keep their families together. She died of peritonitis in 1895 and was buried in the Bairnsdale cemetery. She was survived by her husband, three daughters and two sons.
