= William Mitchell (missionary) =

British missionary (c. 1801–1870)

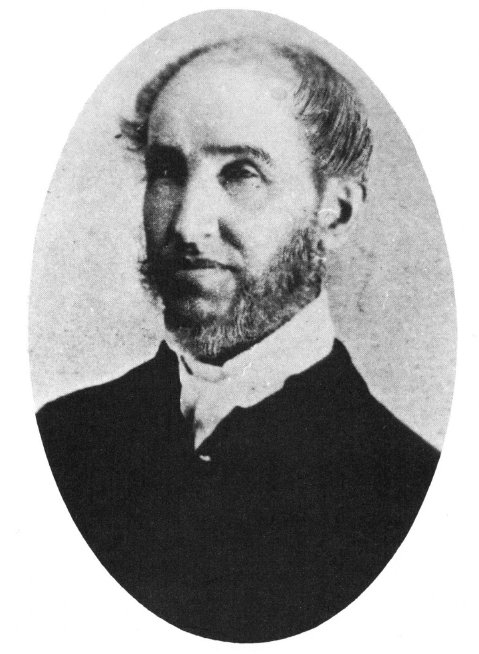
William Mitchell

William Mitchell (c. 1801 – 3 August 1870) was a Church of England priest who was the second ordained person, after Louis Giustiniani, to provide religious services in the Swan Valley area of the Swan River Colony. He worked in the Swan Parish for over 20 years before moving to Perth to take up a position working with convicts and prisoners in the Perth Gaol in Beaufort Street.

Mitchell was the first rector of the Swan Parish, an area which extended north to Gingin and Chittering and east to Toodyay and York. The southern boundary included Guildford and Midland.

== Early life and India ==
Mitchell was born in County Monaghan, Ireland, in about 1801. His father, William Owen Mitchell, died in Albany, New York, in 1809. By 1813 Mitchell was living with his grandfather, Blayney Owen Mitchell, a well-known attorney, in Dublin. While living there, he was apprenticed to an apothecary for about one year and studied at Trinity College, Dublin before deciding to become a missionary.

Missionary training was done at Olney, Buckinghamshire and at the Church Missionary House in Salisbury Square, London which was run by the Church Missionary Society from where he was ordained as a priest by the Bishop of London in 1825. In January 1826 he married Mary Anne Holmes. They left Ireland for a missionary position in India, where two daughters and a son were born in 1826, 1828 and 1829.

Due to the failing health of his wife, the family returned to England. However, she died in March 1831.

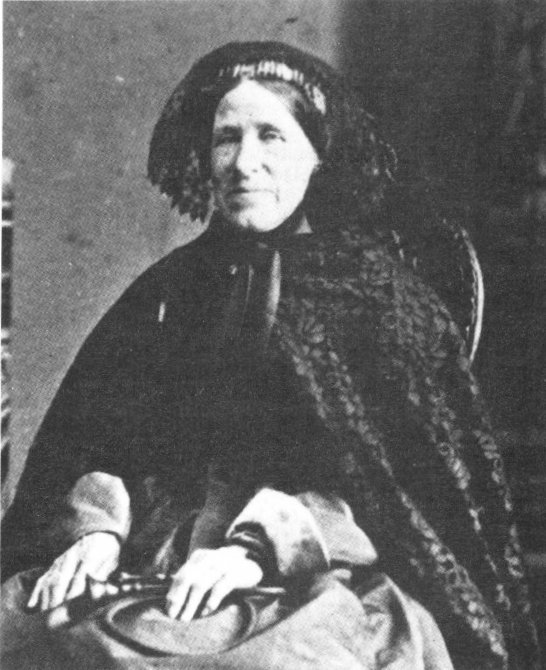
Mitchell's second wife, Frances Tree Mitchell (née Tatlock)

Mitchell met a school teacher, Frances Tree Tatlock, and they married on 24 January 1832 before sailing for India to continue the missionary work in Bombay. His wife gave birth to a son, Blaney, on 12 November 1832 but he died on 16 August 1833. A second son, Samuel, was born on 5 February 1834. Frances and the children returned to England on board Severn in February 1834, leaving William to continue his missionary work until he returned to England in April 1835 due to his own failing health. After recuperating for some time on the Isle of Wight, Mitchell had a disagreement with his Church Missionary Society employers and started to seek alternative missionary work.

== Recruitment ==
Frederick Irwin travelled to England in 1834 to seek clergy for the Swan River Colony and, as a result, a society within the Church of England was formed called the Western Australian Missionary Society, later to merge with other similar societies to become the Colonial and Continental Church Society. This organisation provided Anglican missionaries for many of England's colonies in Australia, New Zealand and South Africa.

In 1836, a meeting was held in Guildford of residents of the Middle and Upper Swan regions of the new colony "... for the purpose of obtaining a clergyman for those populous districts, which owing to their remoteness from the Colonial Chaplains' residence, were destitute of spiritual leadership and devoid of public worship."

Shortly after, Giustiniani was appointed, arriving at the Swan Parish in July 1836. He started a church at Woodbridge in Guildford and established the Middle Swan native mission (at the site of what was to become St Mary's Church, Middle Swan), aimed at evangelising the local Aboriginal population. His tenure was unpopular, however, and he left the colony in 1838.

Mitchell was appointed to the replacement position and he and his family and a governess named Anne Breeze left Portsmouth on board Shepherd on 1 April 1838, arriving at Fremantle on 4 August 1838.

The eldest child – Annie, then 12 years old – described her first impressions in her memoirs:

The ship "Shepherd" anchored off Garden Island on 4 August 1838, after a voyage of four months and three days. We landed at Fremantle by the ships boats. The first sight we witnessed was a very large whale lying on the sea beach at Fremantle, from which the natives were cutting large pieces and carrying them away on spears.

We lodged at Fremantle for a week and then proceeded to Government House where we were entertained by Sir James Stirling and Lady Stirling. It was usual practice at this time for new arrivals to call at Government House on arrival. We stayed at Judge Mackies house for a while (he was the first Judge in the Colony). After this we went to Henley Park, on the Upper Swan, by boat. Major Irwin was landlord at this time. He was Commandant of the troops in W.A. We stayed with him for a week or so then went to the Mission-house on the Middle Swan where we settled.

The whole of Perth at this time was all deep sand and scrub. There was no road or railway to Perth. All transport was done by water travel. The banks of the Swan River were a mass of green fields and flowers, with everlastings as far as the eye could see.

At the time of arrival, there were only two vessels, the "Shepherd" and the "Britomart" plying between London and Western Australia. When a ship arrived, a cannon was fired to let people know that a vessel had arrived. The people used to ride or row down to Fremantle to get their letters. There were then about seven or eight hundred people settled in W.A. mostly along the banks of the Swan.

There was no church in the colony at this time and the services were conducted in the courthouse by the Revd John Wittenoom, the first colonial chaplain.

The natives were held in dread, as they occasionally attacked the settlers. We were surrounded by natives for several months, and Captain Grey (afterwards Governor of New Zealand) used to supply us with rice and sugar to give to the natives to settle quietly and enable my father to learn their lingo. This went quietly until one night one of the Aborigines speared another while he was sleeping. With that the natives cleared out and would not return for a considerable time on account of their fellows spirit worrying them. The whites generally travelled together as they were afraid of the natives giving them a prod with a spear.

The governor and colonial secretary used to ride up the Swan and visit all of the houses. The people were very hospitable at this time and used to take sheets off the bed to use as a tablecloth. No boots or shoes were to be obtained and the Governors' children used to go about barefoot like the rest of them.

We used to often be for weeks together without any flour to make bread and had to live on rice and salt pork. We used to pay seven and six for a leg of mutton. The only fruit available was had when a vessel used to come from the Cape of Good Hope occasionally with Cape fruit.

== Parish life ==
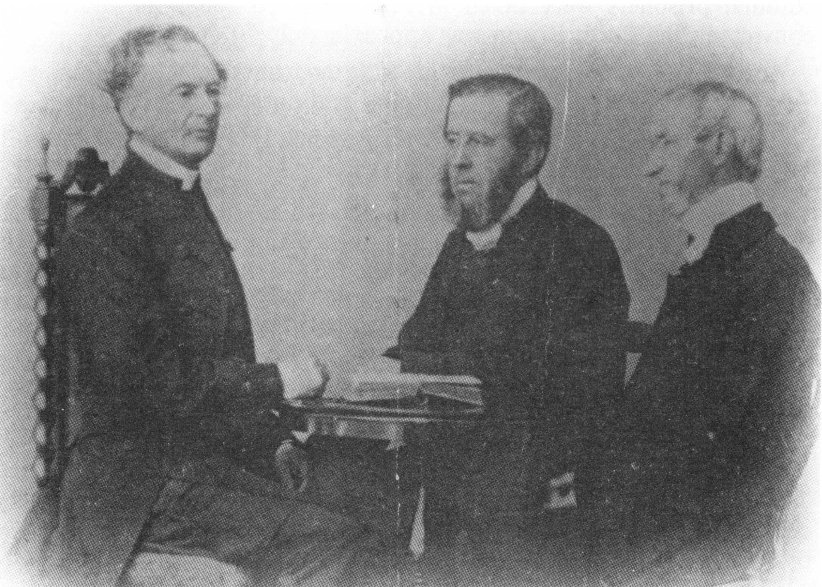
Bishop Hale, Archdeacon James Brown and the Revd William Mitchell, early Anglican clergy in the Swan River Colony

The mission house in Middle Swan, which had been built for Giustiniani on a narrow strip of land known as the Mission Grant, was purchased for £150. The 350-hectare (866-acre) grant was originally given to settler John Wade in September 1829. It ran for about 16 kilometres (10 mi) from the river to the Darling Range but was only 10 chains (201.17 metres or 660.0 feet) wide. The house was made of mud bricks with a thatched roof and is believed to have stood where Huddelston House now stands at Swanleigh, a short distance from St Mary's.

Immediately after arrival, a school was established, with Anne Breeze assisting.

A church for which construction had been initiated by Giustiani in East Guildford was completed in 1839. It was consecrated as "St Matthew's".

On 5 August 1839 the foundation stone for St Mary's Church in Middle Swan was laid, and opened fifteen months later by Governor John Hutt on 29 November 1840. It was built in memory of Lucy Yule, the wife of Magistrate T. N. Yule who died and was the first person buried on the site in 1838. The church was built with an octagonal layout and could hold about 100 people. It was consecrated in 1848 and remained in use until 1869 when it was replaced by a new rectangular church immediately adjacent.

Prior to the arrival of Mitchell, church services in Upper Swan were conducted at Henley Park by lay-preachers, either by Major Frederick Irwin who was the joint owner of that property with Judge William Mackie, or by George Fletcher Moore who had a land grant on the opposite (eastern) side of the river. Moore would often swim across the river to conduct the service. Part of the Henley Park estate included the site at which James Stirling had camped in his 1827 exploratory journey up the river. Accordingly, an area of land within Henley Park was donated by the owners for the construction of a church which was named All Saints Church. The foundation stone was laid on 31 October 1839 with the church consecrated on 21 November 1848. That church is the oldest still-standing church in the state.

Within three years of his arrival, Mitchell had overseen the opening of three permanent church buildings in his parish where Perth and Fremantle were yet to have one.

In December 1840, Mitchell officiated at the marriage of Anne Breeze and Henry Camfield, the Post Master General at St Mary's.

In 1842, he was reclassified by the governor from a missionary to a chaplain and first rector of the Swan Parish.

Three additional children were born in the Mission House, in 1841, 1843 and 1846, which meant a family of seven children spanning 20 years.

In 1858, after 20 years in the Swan Parish, Mitchell was transferred to Perth where he and his family lived at the Deanery. His position was Chaplain of the Perth Gaol as well as chaplaincy duties at various hospitals in Perth.

After returning from a brief trip to visit his son Samuel in Albany in 1870, his youngest son Andrew died suddenly on 31 May. Mitchell became ill and died in Perth, Western Australia, at the age of 70 on 3 August 1870. He was buried at Middle Swan. His wife Frances died in Perth on 1 July 1879. They are both buried, along with Andrew, at St Mary's graveyard.

== Family ==
A full list of his children and their spouses is as follows:

- First wife: Mary Anne Holmes (1803–1831). Married 1826
  - Annie (1826–1917). Married: Edward Lane Courthope
  - Susan Augusta (1828–1867). Married: Philip Lamothe Snell Chauncy
  - William Owen (1829–1914). Married: Isa Izon Bickley
- Second wife: Frances Tree Tatlock (1806–1879). Married 1832
  - Blaney (1832–1833)
  - Samuel (1834–1908). Married: Mary Ann Bispham
  - Francis Tree (1841–1894). Married Archdeacon James Brown
  - Charlotte (1843–1922). Married (1): Frederick Parker. Married (2): John Adam
  - Andrew Forster (1846–1870) (unmarried)
