= Anne Camfield =

Founder of school for Aboriginal Australians

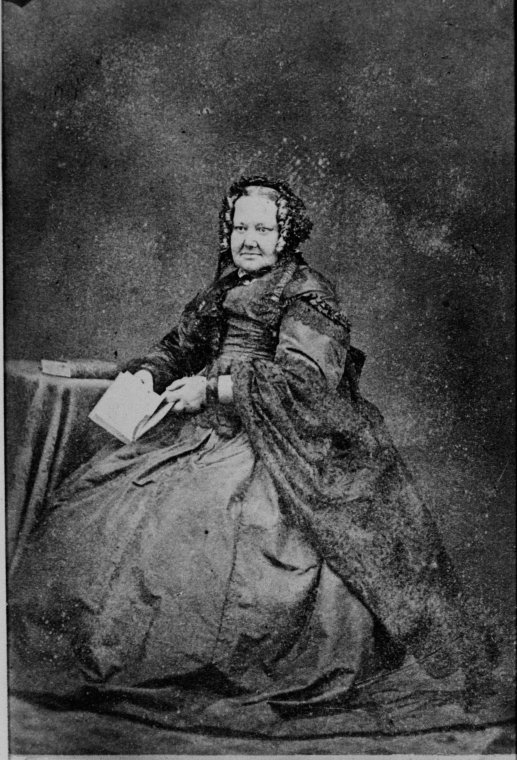
- Camfield in the 1860s
- Born: c. 1808; Staffordshire, England
- Died: 18 February 1896; Evandale, South Australia
- Occupation: Governess/teacher
- Known for: Founding Camfield House school
- Spouse: Henry Camfield

Anne Camfield (née Breeze; 1808 – 18 February 1896) was a photographer, pioneer teacher and headmistress in Western Australia. She founded the first school for Indigenous children in Western Australia, called Annesfield.

== Biography ==
Camfield was born in about 1808. Her father was said to have manufactured pottery in Staffordshire. At this time women were rarely missionaries but Anne was accepted as a governess who would travel to Australia with the Reverend William Mitchell and his family. Their travel was under the auspices of the Colonial and Continental Church Society.

They arrived in the Swan River Colony, Western Australia, on board the Shepherd on 4 August 1838. Mitchell established a mission school at Middle Swan for settlers' children and Aboriginal children, with Breeze assisting. She married Henry Camfield on 19 December 1840 at St Mary's Church, Middle Swan. Henry had been in Australia since 1829 and had a land grant named Burrswood that he rented out for fifty pounds a year.

In 1847 her husband was appointed Resident Magistrate at Albany, which at the time had a European population of about 250. The job carried a salary of £200 a year. The following year Albany opened its first church with John Ramsden Wollaston as chaplain. He was a friend of the Camfield's although the new chaplain regarded Henry as too weak for his job. The new church was inspected by Bishop Short and his archdeacon Matthew Hale. Hale would in time become Bishop of Perth and he and Anne corresponded with each other for several decades.

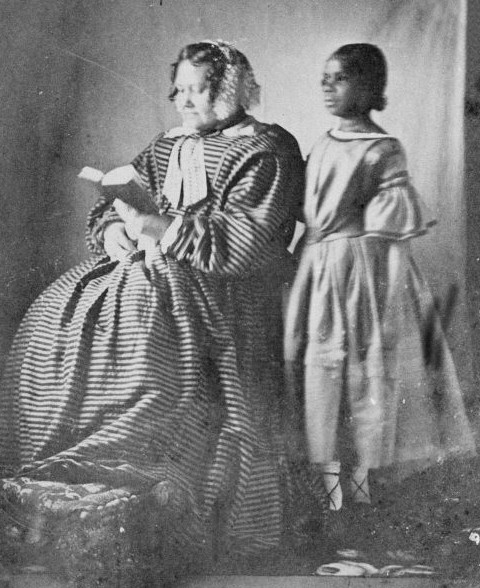
Camfield with Bessie Flower

Camfield House was constructed in 1852 as a residence for them and it was also known as Annesfield. Wollaston like Anne was concerned about young Aboriginal children and he wrote to the colonial secretary noting that the Camfield's new house had space to let and that Anne was willing to take six children into her house. Wollaston was able to secure a grant from Governor Fitzgerald. Money arrived and as the facility grew then so did the requirements. Staff were employed although the Camfield and their assistant Lucy were the core force. Although the Camfields received no salary until 1861. Another building built in 1858 was a purpose built school house built for more Aboriginal children. The school continued under the auspices of Wollaston and Anne Camfield. The school was focused on educating Indigenous children.

One of Anne Camfield's student's was Bessie Flower who went on to study in Sydney and returned to teach. Bessie would eventually leave to gain further experience, but she never returned.

Camfield was a photographer and she is thought to have sent a picture of Hali and his Sister to the London International Exhibition in 1862. There appears to have been no official entry from South Australia and Camfield was awarded an honourable mention.

In 1871 a Select Committee reported on the Aboriginal Natives. They summarised Anne Camfield's evidence saying "One girl, sent to Sydney, played for some time the harmonium in St Philip’s Church, and gained her living by teaching...". Camfield was forced to give up the school in March of that year because of poor health. The following year her husband died.

Camfield eventually moved to South Australia to live with her adoptive daughter, where she died aged 88.
