= Have a Go Day =

Have a Go Day, marketed as "Have a Go Day a LiveLighter Event", (Note: LiveLighter – a joint public health education program between the Western Australian government Department of Health, Cancer Council WA, and the Heart Foundation – is the event naming sponsor.) is a Western Australian event run by the Seniors Recreation Council of Western Australia (SRCWA).

It is targeted at over-55s and encourages them to participate in activities that help to keep them physically and mentally alert. It started in 1992, and takes place at Burswood Park in November every year as part of Seniors Week.

SRCWA developed Have a Go Day to provide many over-50s the opportunity to come together in one place and try many activities and gather information specific to their age group in one place.

The event started in Taylor Reserve, Victoria Park, then moved to McCallum Park with 30 sites and approximately 400 participants. In 1993 SRCWA was invited by the Burswood Park Board to conduct Have a Go Day in the grounds of Burswood Park. Have a Go Day has grown significantly over the years and has remained at Burswood Park. Have a Go Day now attracts in excess of 220 exhibitors and an estimated attendance of 15,000 people.

Have a Go Day is an SRCWA event, and is regarded as the premier event for Western Australia's Seniors Week.

Through Have a Go Day, the Recreation Council provides the over-50 demographic a means to explore the importance of how exercise and activity in their lives benefits them physically, mentally and socially, especially as they age.

Activities at Have a Go Day cover a varied range, including canoeing, exergaming, tai chi, and various sorts of dancing. A range of government and non-government service providers, various clubs and groups also use the event to showcase their organisations. Clubs, groups, seniors agencies and government departments provide information specific to the over-50s, including information which is relevant to pre-retirees and those who have already retired.

== Dates ==
Year	Date	Location
1991	26 Nov	Taylor Reserve, Victoria Park
1992	14 Apr	McCallum Park, Victoria Park
1992	24 Nov	McCallum Park, Victoria Park
1993	9 Nov	Burswood Park, Burswood
1994	8 Nov	Burswood Park, Burswood
1995	7 Nov	Burswood Park, Burswood
1996	12 Nov	Burswood Park, Burswood
1997	11 Nov	Burswood Park, Burswood
1998	10 Nov	Burswood Park, Burswood
1999	9 Nov	Burswood Park, Burswood
2000	14 Nov	Burswood Park, Burswood
2001	13 Nov	Burswood Park, Burswood
2002	29 Oct	Burswood Park, Burswood
2003	11 Nov	Burswood Park, Burswood
2004	26 Oct	Burswood Park, Burswood
2005	25 Oct	Burswood Park, Burswood
2006	25 Oct	Burswood Park, Burswood
2007	31 Oct	Burswood Park, Burswood
2008	29 Oct	Burswood Park, Burswood
2009	28 Oct	Burswood Park, Burswood
2010	3 Nov	Burswood Park, Burswood
2011	9 Nov	Burswood Park, Burswood
2012	14 Nov	Burswood Park, Burswood
2013	13 Nov	Burswood Park, Burswood
2014	12 Nov	Burswood Park, Burswood
2015	11 Nov	Burswood Park, Burswood
2016	9 Nov	Burswood Park, Burswood
2017	1 Nov	Burswood Park, Burswood
2018	14 Nov	Burswood Park, Burswood
2019	13 Nov	Burswood Park, Burswood
2020	11 Nov (subject to COVID-19 restrictions)	Burswood Park, Burswood
2023	15 Nov	Burswood Park, Burswood
2024	13 Nov	Burswood Park, Burswood
2025	12 Nov	Burswood Park, Burswood
