= Seniors Recreation Council of Western Australia =

Seniors Recreation Council of Western Australia is an advocacy organisation situated in Western Australia that organises events, and activities that benefit older members of the population.

It organises Have a Go Day, a major event for the organisation each year.

It also publishes and produces online material of a range of materials that encourage healthy and active living for older people.
