= St Mary's Church, Middle Swan =

Church in Perth, Western Australia

St Mary's Anglican Church, Middle Swan
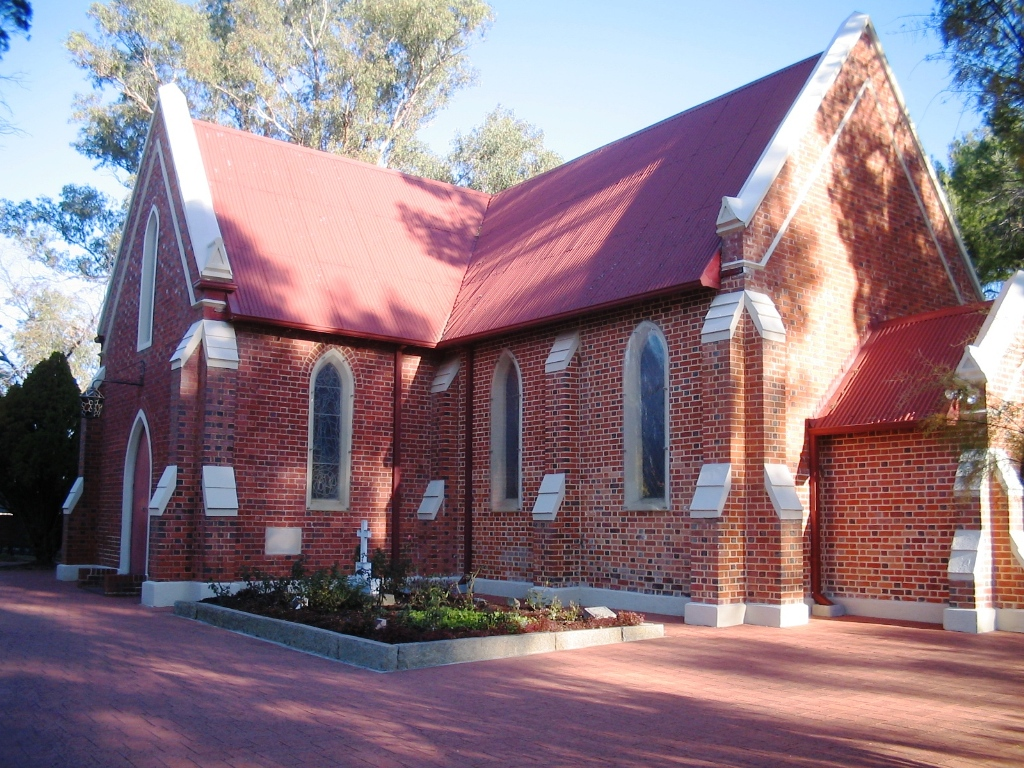
- The church in 2006
- St Mary's Anglican Church, Middle Swan
- 31°51′37″S 116°0′20″E
- Location: Yule Avenue, Middle Swan, Western Australia
- Country: Australia
- Denomination: Anglican
- Website: St. Mary's Church

History
- Status: Church
- Founded: 1839 / 1868
- Dedication: St Mary
- Consecrated: 10 May 1869

Architecture
- Functional status: Active
- Architect: Richard Roach Jewell
- Style: Gothic Revival
- Years built: 1868–1903

Specifications
- Materials: Brick

Administration
- Province: Western Australia
- Diocese: Perth
- Parish: Swan

Western Australia Heritage Register
- Official name: St Mary's Church and Graveyard
- Type: State Registered Place
- Designated: 8 October 1996
- Part of: Swanleigh Precinct (14470)
- Reference no.: 2496

St Mary's Church is an Anglican church on Yule Avenue in the suburb of Middle Swan, Western Australia. St Mary's was built in 1868 on the site of an earlier church which had been built there in 1838. The church is part of the Anglican Diocese of Perth, and it and its graveyard overlook the Swan River in the Swan Valley district.

The church can seat 150 people and is open by appointment only.

== History ==
On 5 August 1839 the foundation stone for the original church was laid, and Governor John Hutt opened it fifteen months later, on 29 November 1840. It was built on land owned by the Church Mission Society and in memory of Lucy Yule, the wife of Magistrate T. N. Yule who died in 1838 and was the first person buried on the site.

The land is believed to be the site of a landing during James Stirling's expedition in 1827. The church was built with an octagonal layout and could hold about 100 people. It was consecrated in 1848 and remained in use until 1869. William Mitchell was the first minister to attend the church.

A new (and the current) rectangular church was built in 1868–69 immediately adjacent to the old octagonal church. It was designed by Richard Roach Jewell and consecrated by Bishop Matthew Hale on 10 March 1869. The adjoining graveyard includes graves of many notable European settlers of the Swan River Colony from 1838.

== General references ==
- Bourke, Michael J. (1987). On the Swan: A History of Swan District, Western Australia. Nedlands, WA: University of Western Australia Press for the Swan Shire Council. ISBN 0855642580.
- Page, Charles (2002). Saint Mary's Churchyard Middle Swan: A Review of Churchyard Occupants and Memorials. Middle Swan, WA: Parish of Swan. OCLC 224562490.
- Peterkin, A. Roy (1988). The Noisy Mansions: The story of Swanleigh 1868 - 1971 (2nd ed.). Midland, WA: Swanleigh Council. ISBN 1862521808.
- Wilson, Harold S. (1999). A History of the Anglican Parish of Swan. Bassendean, WA: Access Press. ISBN 0864451342.
