= Severn (ship) =

Several ships have been named Severn for the River Severn:

- Severn (1806 ship) was launched at Bristol and spent most of her career as a West Indiaman. In 1813 she ran down and sank another merchantman. In late 1838 Severn's crew had to abandon her in the Atlantic in a sinking condition.
- Liverpool Packet was originally the American slave ship Severn, built at Baltimore and captured in 1811. She became a privateer schooner from Liverpool, Nova Scotia, that captured 50 American vessels in the War of 1812. American privateers captured Liverpool Packet in 1813, but she failed to take any prizes during the four months before she was recaptured. She was repurchased by her original Nova Scotia owners and returned to raiding American commerce. Liverpool Packet was the most successful privateer vessel ever to sail out of a Canadian port.
- Severn was launched in 1812 at Calcutta. She sailed to England, where the navy purchased her in 1813 for use as a troopship and transport; the Navy renamed her HMS Camel. She had an uneventful naval career and the navy sold her in 1831. Her new owner returned her to her name, Severn. She made one voyage to Bengal and back for the British East India Company (EIC). She continued to trade with India but disappeared circa 1841 while sailing from Calcutta to China.
- Severn (1817 ship) was launched in Chepstow. Her crew abandoned her in the Baltic on 28 November 1825.
- Severn (1867 ship), of 398 GRT, was a barque built by Crown at Sunderland in 1867. On 30 January 1881, the steamship Mayumba collided with Severn at 33.47°N 15.27°W, sinking her with loss of life.

== See also ==
- HMS Severn - one of nine ships of the Royal Navy
- USS Severn - one of four ships of the United States Navy
- SS Severn River
- Severn-class lifeboat
