= Causeway bus station =

Bus station in Perth, Western Australia

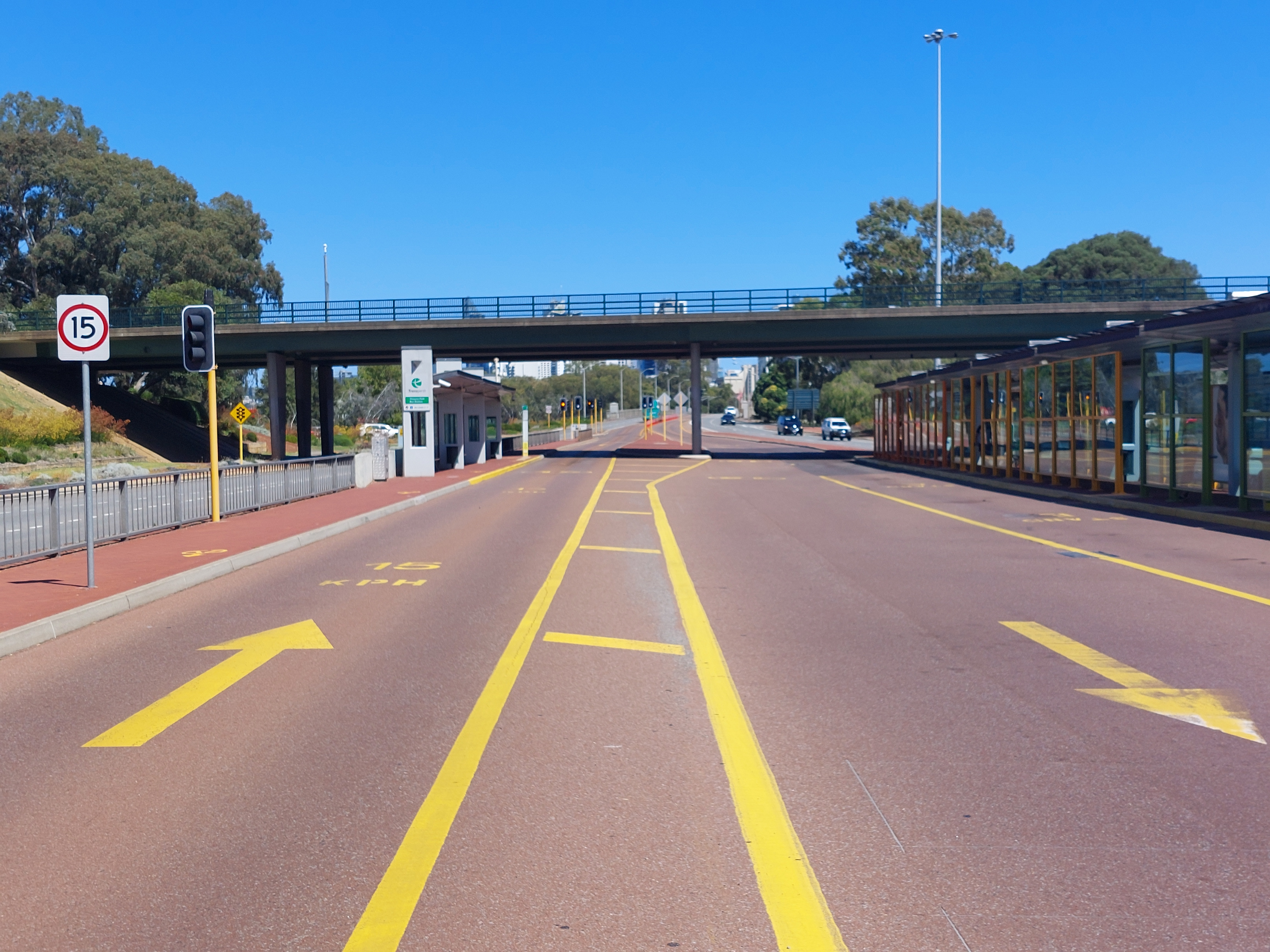

General information
- Location: Shepperton Road, Victoria Park; Western Australia; Australia
- Coordinates: 31°58′06″S 115°53′21″E
- Owner: Public Transport Authority
- Bus routes: 18
- Bus stands: 7

Other information
- Fare zone: 1
- Website: Transperth
Location

Causeway bus station is a Transperth bus station in Victoria Park, Western Australia. It is located at the eastern end of The Causeway under the bridge carrying the Great Eastern Highway and Canning Highway. It has seven stands and is served by 19 Transperth routes operated by Path Transit, Swan Transit and Transdev WA. The station was previously known as Victoria Park transfer station. On 28 January 2024, the station was renamed to its current name to prevent confusion with the nearby Victoria Park railway station.

== Bus routes ==
=== Stands 1–5 ===
Canning Highway services
Stop	Route	Destination / description	Notes
Stand 1	32	to Como via Mill Point Road	
Stand 1	33	to Curtin Central bus station via Kensington	
Stand 1	910	to Fremantle station via Canning Highway	High frequency

Great Eastern Highway services
Stop	Route	Destination / description	Notes
Stand 2	39	to Redcliffe station via Star Street & Belmont Forum Shopping Centre	
Stand 2	270	to High Wycombe station via Belmont Forum Shopping Centre & Kewdale	
Stand 2	935	to Redcliffe station via Belmont Forum Shopping Centre	High frequency
Stand 2	940	to Redcliffe station via Great Eastern Highway	High frequency

Shepperton Road services
Stop	Route	Destination / description	Notes
Stand 3	38	to Cloverdale via Shepperton Road & Belmont Forum Shopping Centre	
Stand 3	930	to Thornlie station via Shepperton Road & Albany Highway	High frequency
Stand 3	930X	to Thornlie Station via Albany Highway	Limited Stops

Albany Highway services
Stop	Route	Destination / description	Notes
Stand 4	176	to Oats Street station via Victoria Park	Selected services extending as route 282 or 283
Stand 4	177	to Cannington station via Albany Highway & Chapman Road	
Stand 4	178	to Bull Creek station via Albany Highway, Shelley & Rossmoyne	
Stand 4	179	to Bull Creek station via Albany Highway, Riverton Forum Shopping Centre	
Stand 4	220	to Armadale station via Albany Highway	

Curtin University services
Stop	Route	Destination / description	Notes
Stand 5	72	to Cannington station via Victoria Park & Curtin University	
Stand 5	73	to Ranford Road Station via Victoria Park & Curtin University	
Stand 5	960	to Curtin University Bus Station	High frequency

=== Stands 6–7 ===
Perth services, except from Canning Highway
Stop	Route	Destination / description	Notes
Stand 6	38, 220, 930X	to Perth Busport	Limited Stops (930X)
Stand 6	39, 72, 73, 176, 177, 178, 179, 270	to Elizabeth Quay bus station	
Stand 6	930, 940	to Elizabeth Quay bus station	High frequency
Stand 6	935	to Kings Park via Perth	High frequency
Stand 6	960	to Mirrabooka bus station via Perth, Edith Cowan University Mount Lawley & Alexander Drive	High frequency

Perth services from Canning Highway
Stop	Route	Destination / description	Notes
Stand 7	32, 33	to Elizabeth Quay bus station	
Stand 7	910	to Perth Busport	High frequency
