= Perth Park =

Precinct in Burswood, Western Australia

- The site of Perth Park in February 2026
- Location: Perth, Western Australia
- Coordinates: 31.956474°S 115.892645°E
- Opened: 2027 (planned)
- Major events: Perth Super Sprint
- Website: www.perthpark.wa.gov.au

Street Circuit
- Length: 3.4 km (2.1 mi)
- Turns: 12

Perth Park is a sports and entertainment precinct under construction in Burswood, Western Australia. The 28-hectare (69-acre) precinct comprises a 3.4-kilometre (2.1 mi) multi-use track, a 12,000-capacity outdoor amphitheatre, a multi-use event and indoor sports building, a hospitality venue, and landscaped parkland. The project is scheduled to be completed in 2027.

== History ==
In June 2024 the Cook government announced its support to build a street circuit around Burswood, a suburb of Perth in Western Australia. The venue is proposed to replace Wanneroo Raceway as the venue for the Perth Super Sprint. Originally proposed to hold a round of the 2026 Supercars Championship, it is now proposed to be the first round of the 2028 season.

The proposed street circuit was an issue during the 2025 Western Australian state election, in which the Cook government retained office. The Town of Victoria Park has opposed the proposal, with the mayor claiming the government planned to move the Perth Motorplex from Kwinana, but has been dismissed several times. A new name for the precinct, Perth Park, along with design plans were announced in November 2025.

The project is expected to be completed in 2027 and cost A$218 million. Site establishment works began in February 2026. In May 2026, a consortium of Seymour Whyte, Civmec and Aurecon was awarded a contract to build the park.

== Planned features ==
- Multi-use track – A 3.4 km (2.1 mi) 12-turn track for an annual street circuit motorsport event and cycling, running, triathlon and parasport events. The track will be built to FIA Grade 3 certification.
- Outdoor amphitheatre – 12,000-capacity outdoor amphitheatre for concerts and events
- Multi-use building – A multi-use event, function and meeting facility which includes two indoor courts tailored for disability sport such as basketball, badminton, rugby and tennis. The ground floor of the building will be adapted into pit facilities during the annual motorsport event.
- Hospitality venue – A separate hospitality venue
- Landscaped parkland – Park space for large-scale festivals and year-round community use. Includes an urban forest in the south-east of Perth Park.
