= Camfield House =

Heritage listed buildings in Albany, Western Australia

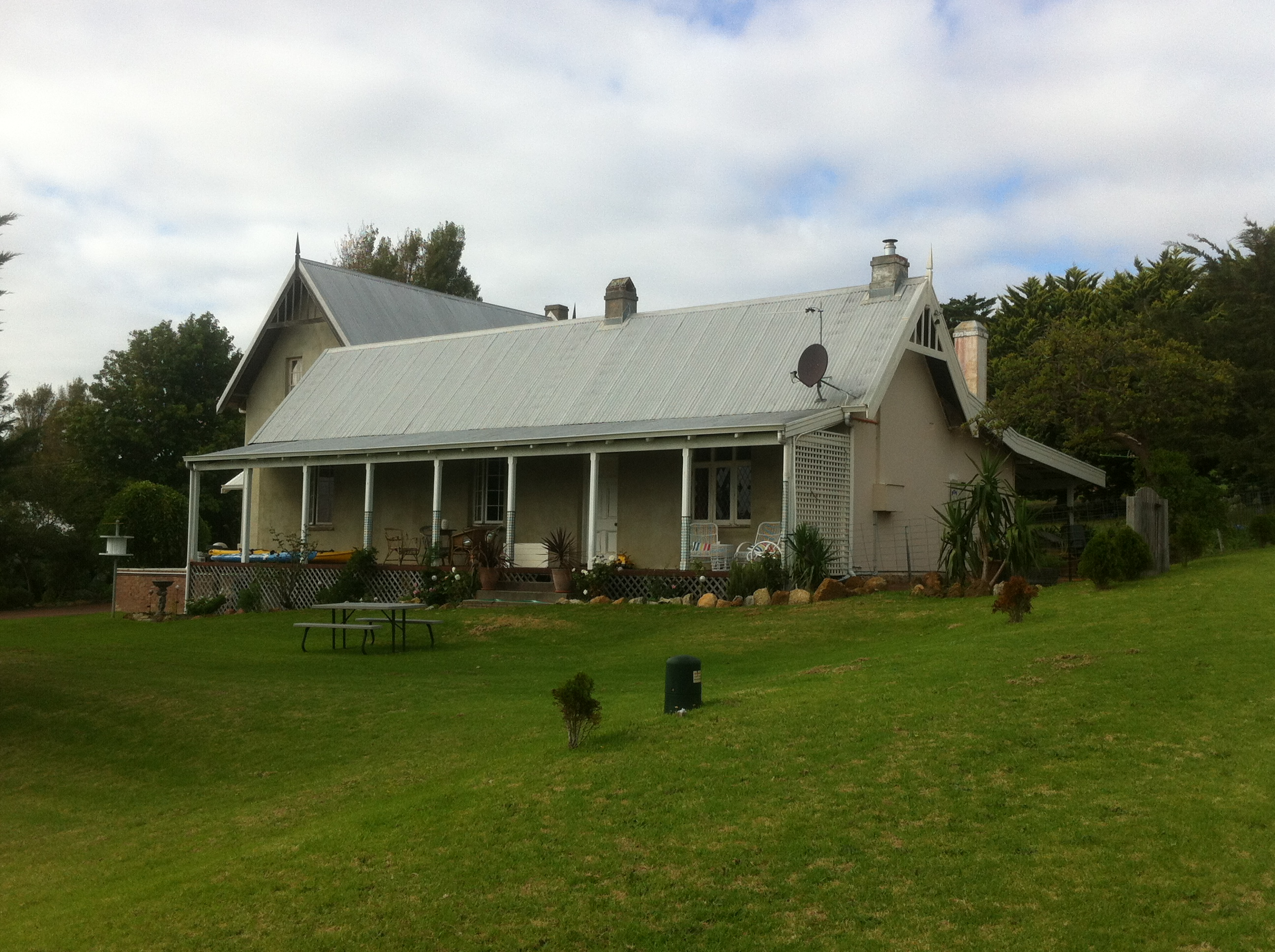
- View of Camfield House from the north, 2015
- Interactive map of the Camfield House area

General information
- Type: Conglomerate of buildings
- Location: Albany, Western Australia
- Coordinates: 35.0197°S 117.8782°E

Western Australia Heritage Register
- Type: State Registered Place
- Designated: 20 September 2002
- Reference no.: 17

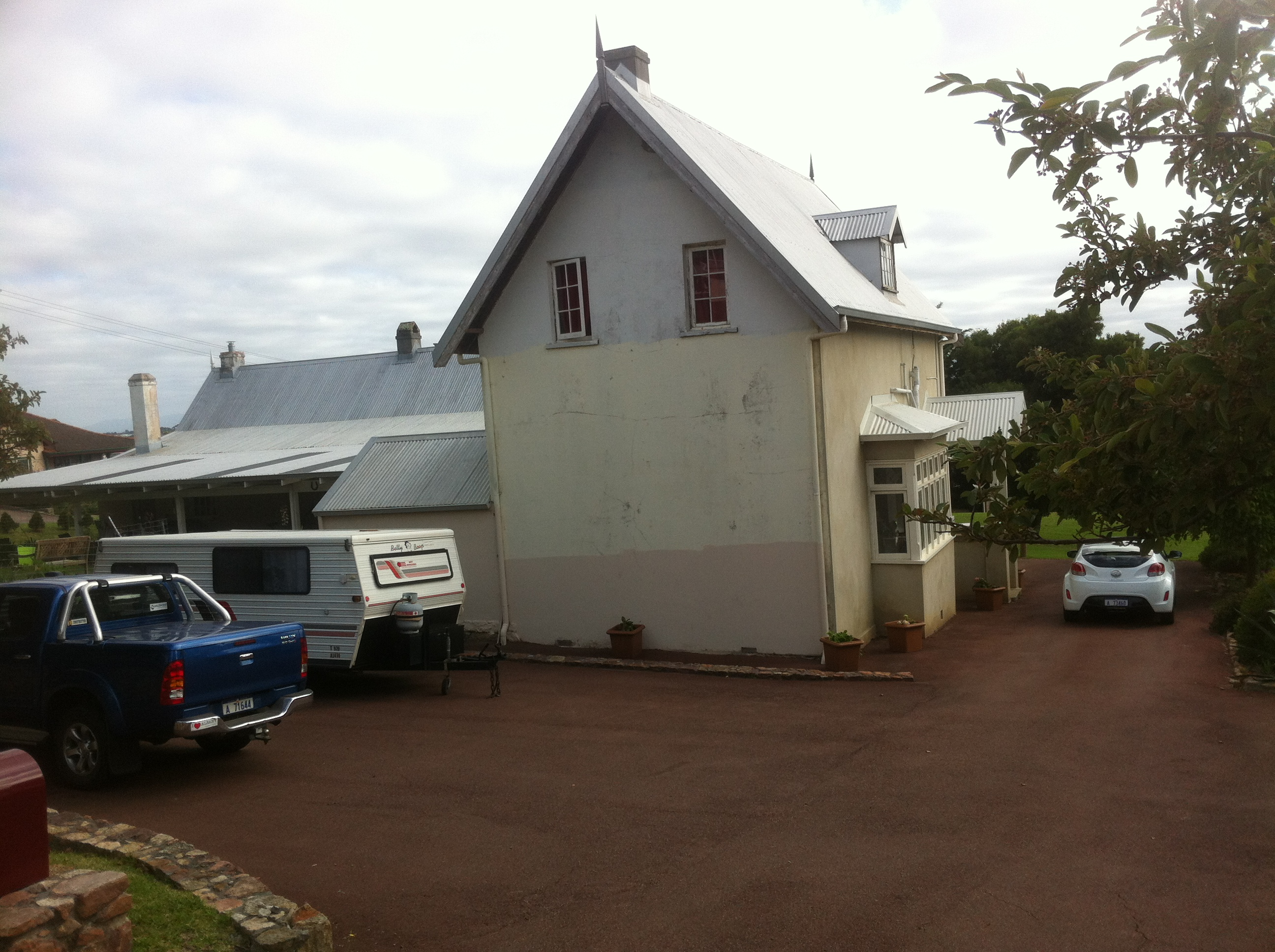
View from the south

Camfield House, also referred to as Annesfield, is a conglomerate of buildings in Albany in the Great Southern region of Western Australia.

The property contains a wattle and daub house constructed in 1852 as a residence for the Camfields that was also known as Annesfield. The other building is a school house built for Aboriginal children. The school commenced in 1852 under the auspices of John Wollaston and Anne Camfield. The school was focused on educating Indigenous children.

The house is a simple colonial design, rectangular in shape with a steeply pitched gable corrugated iron roof. The walls are coated in stucco and have three sets of casement windows set over the verandah. Four chimneys are set asymmetrically around the house. The school is a two-storey brick building with a steeply pitched gabled corrugated iron roof. It has exposed brick on one side and is whitewashed on the others.

In 1857 the Camfields built a separate school room near the house with classroom, attached kitchen and accommodation for up to eight children. In 1858 a total of 23 children were at the school; this increased to 55 in 1868. The school went into decline shortly afterward with Anne Camfield struggling with the workload and her advanced years.

The buildings were classified by the National Trust in 1973 and placed on the municipal inventory in 2001.

== See also ==
List of places on the State Register of Heritage Places in the City of Albany
