= 2017 İstanbul Cup – Doubles =

Doubles
- 2017 İstanbul Cup

Final
- Champions: (Slovenia) Dalila Jakupović (Ukraine) Nadiia Kichenok
- Runners-up: (United States) Nicole Melichar (Belgium) Elise Mertens
- Score: 7–6^{(8–6)}, 6–2

Details
- Draw: 16
- Seeds: 4

Events
Singles	Doubles
← 2016 ·	İstanbul Cup	· 2018 →

Andreea Mitu and İpek Soylu were the defending champions, but chose not to compete together. Mitu played alongside Mariana Duque Mariño, but lost in the quarterfinals to Tímea Babos and Çağla Büyükakçay. Soylu teamed up with Hsieh Su-wei, but lost in the first round to Dalila Jakupović and Nadiia Kichenok.

Jakupović and Kichenok went on to win the title, defeating Nicole Melichar and Elise Mertens in the final, 7–6^{(8–6)}, 6–2.

== Seeds ==
1. (Chinese Taipei) Hsieh Su-wei / (Turkey) İpek Soylu (first round)
2. (Argentina) María Irigoyen / (Poland) Paula Kania (first round)
3. (Japan) Nao Hibino / (Montenegro) Danka Kovinić (semifinals)
4. (United States) Nicole Melichar / (Belgium) Elise Mertens (final)

== Draw ==
Key

- Q = Qualifier
- WC = Wild card
- LL = Lucky loser
- Alt = Alternate
- ITF = ITF entry
- PR = Protected ranking
- SR = Special ranking
- SE = Special exempt
- JE = Junior exempt
- JR = Junior Accelerator Programme entrant
- CO = College Accelerator Programme entrant
- NG = Next Gen Accelerator Program entrant
- w/o = Walkover
- r = Retired
- d = Defaulted

=== Draw ===
First round
1	(Chinese Taipei) S-w Hsieh (Turkey) İ Soylu	6^{5}	2
(Slovenia) D Jakupović (Ukraine) N Kichenok	7^{7}	6
(Russia) A Kalinskaya (Belarus) L Marozava	1	3
(Canada) E Bouchard (Belgium) K Flipkens	6	6
3	(Japan) N Hibino (Montenegro) D Kovinić	3	6	[10]
(Germany) N Geuer (Spain) L Pous Tió	6	1	[4]
(Russia) N Dzalamidze (Russia) V Kudermetova	6	6^{5}	[10]
(Japan) A Omae (Czech Republic) R Voráčová	2	7^{7}	[6]
WC	(Turkey) A Aksu (Ukraine) D Yastremska	6	6^{4}	[10]
WC	(Turkey) P Özgen (Turkey) M Sezer	0	7^{7}	[8]
(Slovakia) M Hončová (Czech Republic) L Kunčíková	2	2
4	(United States) N Melichar (Belgium) E Mertens	6	6
(Romania) A Cadanțu (Sweden) C Lister	2	1
(Hungary) T Babos (Turkey) Ç Büyükakçay	6	6
(Colombia) M Duque Mariño (Romania) A Mitu	6	6
2	(Argentina) M Irigoyen (Poland) P Kania	3	4

Quarterfinals
(Slovenia) D Jakupović (Ukraine) N Kichenok	w/o
(Canada) E Bouchard (Belgium) K Flipkens
3	(Japan) N Hibino (Montenegro) D Kovinić	6	6
(Russia) N Dzalamidze (Russia) V Kudermetova	4	2
WC	(Turkey) A Aksu (Ukraine) D Yastremska	4	2
4	(United States) N Melichar (Belgium) E Mertens	6	6
(Hungary) T Babos (Turkey) Ç Büyükakçay	3	6	[10]
(Colombia) M Duque Mariño (Romania) A Mitu	6	2	[8]

Semifinals
(Slovenia) D Jakupović (Ukraine) N Kichenok	6	6
3	(Japan) N Hibino (Montenegro) D Kovinić	4	4
4	(United States) N Melichar (Belgium) E Mertens	6	7^{7}
(Hungary) T Babos (Turkey) Ç Büyükakçay	3	6^{1}

Final
(Slovenia) D Jakupović (Ukraine) N Kichenok	7^{8}	6
4	(United States) N Melichar (Belgium) E Mertens	6^{6}	2
