= 2015 İstanbul Cup – Doubles =

Doubles
- 2015 İstanbul Cup

Final
- Champions: (Russia) Daria Gavrilova (Ukraine) Elina Svitolina
- Runners-up: (Turkey) Çağla Büyükakçay (Serbia) Jelena Janković
- Score: 5–7, 6–1, [10–4]

Details
- Draw: 16
- Seeds: 4

Events
Singles	Doubles
← 2014 ·	İstanbul Cup	· 2016 →

Misaki Doi and Elina Svitolina were the defending champions, but Doi decided not to participate.
Svitolina partnered Daria Gavrilova and successfully defended the title, defeating Çağla Büyükakçay and Jelena Janković in the final, 5–7, 6–1, [10–4].

== Seeds ==
1. (Czech Republic) Andrea Hlaváčková / (Russia) Anastasia Pavlyuchenkova (quarterfinals)
2. (Russia) Margarita Gasparyan / (Russia) Alexandra Panova (first round)
3. (Georgia (country)) Oksana Kalashnikova / (Ukraine) Nadiia Kichenok (first round, retired)
4. (Russia) Vitalia Diatchenko / (Ukraine) Olga Savchuk (semifinals)

== Draw ==
Key

- Q = Qualifier
- WC = Wild card
- LL = Lucky loser
- Alt = Alternate
- ITF = ITF entry
- PR = Protected ranking
- SR = Special ranking
- SE = Special exempt
- JE = Junior exempt
- JR = Junior Accelerator Programme entrant
- CO = College Accelerator Programme entrant
- NG = Next Gen Accelerator Program entrant
- w/o = Walkover
- r = Retired
- d = Defaulted

First round
1	(Czech Republic) A Hlaváčková (Russia) A Pavlyuchenkova	6	4	[10]
(Ukraine) Y Beygelzimer (Latvia) J Ostapenko	4	6	[6]
(Japan) H Kuwata (Japan) K Nara	2	3
Alt	(Russia) D Gavrilova (Ukraine) E Svitolina	6	6
4	(Russia) V Diatchenko (Ukraine) O Savchuk	5	7^{7}	[10]
(Italy) F Schiavone (Turkey) İ Soylu	7	6^{2}	[6]
(Ukraine) K Bondarenko (Czech Republic) E Hrdinová	6	6
(Romania) D Buzean (Slovakia) C Škamlová	2	2
WC	(Estonia) A Kontaveit (Russia) E Kulichkova	6	6
(China) Z Yang (China) L Zhu	4	4
(Chinese Taipei) C-w Chan (United States) N Melichar	6	4
3	(Georgia (country)) O Kalashnikova (Ukraine) N Kichenok	2	1^{r}
(Japan) M Eguchi (Poland) J Jegiołka	4	1
WC	(Turkey) A Aksu (Turkey) M Sezer	6	6
(Turkey) Ç Büyükakçay (Serbia) J Janković	6	6
2	(Russia) M Gasparyan (Russia) A Panova	4	3

Quarterfinals
1	(Czech Republic) A Hlaváčková (Russia) A Pavlyuchenkova	6^{2}	7^{7}	[5]
Alt	(Russia) D Gavrilova (Ukraine) E Svitolina	7^{7}	6^{3}	[10]
4	(Russia) V Diatchenko (Ukraine) O Savchuk	7^{7}	4	[10]
(Ukraine) K Bondarenko (Czech Republic) E Hrdinová	6^{0}	6	[4]
WC	(Estonia) A Kontaveit (Russia) E Kulichkova	6	7^{7}
(Chinese Taipei) C-w Chan (United States) N Melichar	3	6^{5}
WC	(Turkey) A Aksu (Turkey) M Sezer	3	2
(Turkey) Ç Büyükakçay (Serbia) J Janković	6	6

Semifinals
Alt	(Russia) D Gavrilova (Ukraine) E Svitolina	6	7
4	(Russia) V Diatchenko (Ukraine) O Savchuk	1	5
WC	(Estonia) A Kontaveit (Russia) E Kulichkova	3	6	[6]
(Turkey) Ç Büyükakçay (Serbia) J Janković	6	2	[10]

Final
Alt	(Russia) D Gavrilova (Ukraine) E Svitolina	5	6	[10]
(Turkey) Ç Büyükakçay (Serbia) J Janković	7	1	[4]
