= 2017 İstanbul Cup =

- Date: 24–30 April
- Edition: 10th
- Category: WTA International
- Draw: 32S / 16D
- Prize money: $250,000
- Surface: Clay
- Location: Istanbul, Turkey

Champions

Singles
- (Ukraine) Elina Svitolina

Doubles
- (Slovenia) Dalila Jakupović / (Ukraine) Nadiia Kichenok
← 2016 ·	İstanbul Cup	· 2018 →

The 2017 İstanbul Cup (also known as the TEB BNP Paribas İstanbul Cup for sponsorship reasons) was a women's tennis tournament played on outdoor clay courts. It was the 10th edition of the İstanbul Cup, and part of the WTA International tournaments of the 2017 WTA Tour. It took place in Istanbul, Turkey, from 24 April through 30 April 2017. First-seeded Elina Svitolina won the singles title.

== Finals ==
=== Singles ===
- (Ukraine) Elina Svitolina defeated (Belgium) Elise Mertens, 6–2, 6–4

=== Doubles ===
- (Slovenia) Dalila Jakupović / (Ukraine) Nadiia Kichenok defeated (United States) Nicole Melichar / (Belgium) Elise Mertens, 7–6^{(8–6)}, 6–2

== Points and prize money ==
Event	W	F	SF	QF	Round of 16	Round of 32	Q	Q2	Q1
Singles	280	180	110	60	30	1	18	12	1
Doubles	280	180	110	60	1	—	—	—	—

=== Prize money ===
Event	W	F	SF	QF	Round of 16	Round of 32	Q2	Q1
Singles	$43,000	$21,400	$11,500	$6,175	$3,400	$2,100	$1,020	$600
Doubles	$12,300	$6,400	$3,435	$1,820	$960	—	—	—

== Singles main-draw entrants ==
=== Seeds ===
Country	Player	Rank^{1}	Seed
UKR	Elina Svitolina	13	1
HUN	Tímea Babos	30	2
ROU	Irina-Camelia Begu	33	3
CAN	Eugenie Bouchard	58	4
ROU	Sorana Cîrstea	62	5
BEL	Elise Mertens	66	6
BUL	Tsvetana Pironkova	70	7
GER	Andrea Petkovic	75	8

- Rankings are as of April 17, 2017.

=== Other entrants ===
The following players received wildcards into the singles main draw:

- (Turkey) Ayla Aksu
- (Turkey) İpek Soylu
- (Ukraine) Dayana Yastremska

The following player received entry as a special exempt:

- (Czech Republic) ~~Markéta Vondroušová~~

The following players received entry from the qualifying draw:

- (Romania) Alexandra Cadanțu
- (Turkey) Başak Eraydın
- (France) Fiona Ferro
- (Russia) Viktoria Kamenskaya
- (Russia) Elizaveta Kulichkova
- (Switzerland) Conny Perrin

The following players received entry as a lucky loser:

- (Russia) Anna Kalinskaya

=== Withdrawals ===
Before the tournament

- (Spain) Lara Arruabarrena → replaced by (Spain) Sara Sorribes Tormo
- (United States) Vania King → replaced by (Chinese Taipei) Chang Kai-chen
- (Poland) Magda Linette → replaced by (Ukraine) Kateryna Kozlova
- (Kazakhstan) Yulia Putintseva → replaced by (Turkey) Çağla Büyükakçay
- (Romania) Patricia Maria Țig → replaced by (Belgium) Maryna Zanevska
- (Czech Republic) Markéta Vondroušová → replaced by (Russia) Anna Kalinskaya
- (China) Wang Qiang → replaced by (Italy) Sara Errani

== Doubles main-draw entrants ==
=== Seeds ===
Country	Player	Country	Player	Rank^{1}	Seed
TPE	Hsieh Su-wei	TUR	İpek Soylu	124	1
ARG	María Irigoyen	POL	Paula Kania	142	2
JPN	Nao Hibino	MNE	Danka Kovinić	148	3
USA	Nicole Melichar	BEL	Elise Mertens	155	4

- ^{1} Rankings as of April 17, 2017.

=== Other entrants ===
The following pairs received wildcards into the doubles main draw:

- (Turkey) Ayla Aksu / (Ukraine) Dayana Yastremska
- (Turkey) Pemra Özgen / (Turkey) Melis Sezer
