= 2017 İstanbul Cup – Singles =

Singles
- 2017 İstanbul Cup

Final
- Champion: (Ukraine) Elina Svitolina
- Runner-up: (Belgium) Elise Mertens
- Score: 6–2, 6–4

Details
- Draw: 32
- Seeds: 8

Events
Singles	Doubles
- İstanbul Cup

Çağla Büyükakçay was the defending champion, but lost in the quarterfinals to Elise Mertens.

Elina Svitolina won the title, defeating Mertens in the final, 6–2, 6–4.

== Seeds ==
1. (Ukraine) Elina Svitolina (champion)
2. (Hungary) Tímea Babos (second round)
3. (Romania) Irina-Camelia Begu (semifinals)
4. (Canada) Eugenie Bouchard (first round)
5. (Romania) Sorana Cîrstea (quarterfinals)
6. (Belgium) Elise Mertens (final)
7. (Bulgaria) Tsvetana Pironkova (first round)
8. (Germany) Andrea Petkovic (first round)

== Draw ==
Key

- Q = Qualifier
- WC = Wild card
- LL = Lucky loser
- Alt = Alternate
- ITF = ITF entry
- PR = Protected ranking
- SR = Special ranking
- SE = Special exempt
- JE = Junior exempt
- JR = Junior Accelerator Programme entrant
- CO = College Accelerator Programme entrant
- NG = Next Gen Accelerator Program entrant
- w/o = Walkover
- r = Retired
- d = Defaulted

=== Finals ===
Semifinals
1	(Ukraine) Elina Svitolina	6	6
(Slovakia) Jana Čepelová	2	3
3	(Romania) Irina-Camelia Begu	1	1
6	(Belgium) Elise Mertens	6	6

Final
1	(Ukraine) Elina Svitolina	6	6
6	(Belgium) Elise Mertens	2	4

=== Top half ===
First round
1	(Ukraine) E Svitolina	6	0	6
Q	(Russia) V Kamenskaya	4	6	1
Q	(Romania) A Cadanțu	2	6	6
(Japan) N Hibino	6	0	3
(Montenegro) D Kovinić	6^{3}	3
(Greece) M Sakkari	7^{7}	6
Q	(France) F Ferro	3	1
5	(Romania) S Cîrstea	6	6
4	(Canada) E Bouchard	0	4
(Slovakia) J Čepelová	6	6
(Spain) S Sorribes Tormo	6	7
WC	(Turkey) İ Soylu	3	5
(Chinese Taipei) K-c Chang	1	3
LL	(Russia) A Kalinskaya	6	6
WC	(Ukraine) D Yastremska	3	6	6
8	(Germany) A Petkovic	6	0	3

Second round
1	(Ukraine) E Svitolina	6	6
Q	(Romania) A Cadanțu	3	3
(Greece) M Sakkari	4	2
5	(Romania) S Cîrstea	6	6
(Slovakia) J Čepelová	6	7^{7}
(Spain) S Sorribes Tormo	4	6^{3}
LL	(Russia) A Kalinskaya	1	4
WC	(Ukraine) D Yastremska	6	6

Quarterfinals
1	(Ukraine) E Svitolina	6	6
5	(Romania) S Cîrstea	4	4
(Slovakia) J Čepelová	2	7^{7}	6
WC	(Ukraine) D Yastremska	6	6^{4}	4

Semifinals
1	(Ukraine) E Svitolina	6	6
(Slovakia) J Čepelová	2	3

=== Bottom half ===
First round
7	(Bulgaria) T Pironkova	2	4
Q	(Turkey) B Eraydın	6	6
Q	(Russia) E Kulichkova	5	1
WC	(Turkey) A Aksu	7	6
(Slovakia) K Kučová	0	0^{r}
(Belgium) K Flipkens	6	1
(Germany) T Maria	6	1	5
3	(Romania) I-C Begu	1	6	7
6	(Belgium) E Mertens	6	6
(Ukraine) K Kozlova	4	1
(Italy) S Errani	6	6
(Chinese Taipei) S-w Hsieh	0	1
(Turkey) Ç Büyükakçay	6	6
(Belgium) M Zanevska	2	1
Q	(Switzerland) C Perrin	3	2
2	(Hungary) T Babos	6	6

Second round
Q	(Turkey) B Eraydın	6	6
WC	(Turkey) A Aksu	1	3
(Belgium) K Flipkens	1	6	3
3	(Romania) I-C Begu	6	1	6
6	(Belgium) E Mertens	7^{7}	3	6
(Italy) S Errani	6^{3}	6	3
(Turkey) Ç Büyükakçay	6	7^{7}
2	(Hungary) T Babos	4	6^{5}

Quarterfinals
Q	(Turkey) B Eraydın	6	6^{5}	1
3	(Romania) I-C Begu	2	7^{7}	6
6	(Belgium) E Mertens	6	4	6
(Turkey) Ç Büyükakçay	4	6	2

Semifinals
3	(Romania) I-C Begu	1	1
6	(Belgium) E Mertens	6	6

== Qualifying ==
=== Seeds ===
1. (Slovenia) Dalila Jakupović (first round)
2. (Uzbekistan) Sabina Sharipova (first round)
3. (Russia) Anna Kalinskaya (qualifying competition, lucky loser)
4. (Czech Republic) Tereza Martincová (first round)
5. (United Kingdom) Tara Moore (first round)
6. (Russia) Alla Kudryavtseva (qualifying competition)
7. (Slovakia) Viktória Kužmová (first round)
8. (Czech Republic) Tereza Smitková (first round)
9. (Argentina) Nadia Podoroska (qualifying competition)
10. (Russia) Anastasiya Komardina (qualifying competition)
11. (Japan) Akiko Omae (first round)
12. (Russia) Veronika Kudermetova (qualifying competition)

=== Qualifiers ===
1. (Romania) Alexandra Cadanțu
2. (Switzerland) Conny Perrin
3. (Russia) Victoria Kamenskaya
4. (France) Fiona Ferro
5. (Russia) Elizaveta Kulichkova
6. (Turkey) Başak Eraydın

=== Lucky losers ===
1. (Russia) Anna Kalinskaya

=== Draw ===
==== First qualifier ====
First round
1	(Slovenia) Dalila Jakupović	1	4
(Romania) Alexandra Cadanțu	6	6
WC	(Turkey) Melis Sezer	6	4	5
9	(Argentina) Nadia Podoroska	2	6	7

Qualifying competition
(Romania) Alexandra Cadanțu	6	4	6
9	(Argentina) Nadia Podoroska	2	6	3

==== Second qualifier ====
First round
2	(Uzbekistan) Sabina Sharipova	0	3
(Switzerland) Conny Perrin	6	6
(Georgia (country)) Sofia Shapatava	4	2
12	(Russia) Veronika Kudermetova	6	6

Qualifying competition
(Switzerland) Conny Perrin	6	7^{7}
12	(Russia) Veronika Kudermetova	2	6^{5}

==== Third qualifier ====
First round
3	(Russia) Anna Kalinskaya	6	4	7
WC	(Turkey) İpek Öz	3	6	5
(Russia) Viktoria Kamenskaya	6	6
11	(Japan) Akiko Omae	0	0

Qualifying competition
3	(Russia) Anna Kalinskaya	2	4
(Russia) Viktoria Kamenskaya	6	6

==== Fourth qualifier ====
First round
4	(Czech Republic) Tereza Martincová	4	2
(France) Fiona Ferro	6	6
WC	(Turkey) Berfu Cengiz	4	6	2
10	(Russia) Anastasiya Komardina	6	4	6

Qualifying competition
(France) Fiona Ferro	6	6
10	(Russia) Anastasiya Komardina	4	3

==== Fifth qualifier ====
First round
5	(United Kingdom) Tara Moore	0	6	6^{1}
(Brazil) Teliana Pereira	6	4	7^{7}
(Russia) Elizaveta Kulichkova	6	4	6
7	(Slovakia) Viktória Kužmová	4	6	4

Qualifying competition
(Brazil) Teliana Pereira	6	5	4
(Russia) Elizaveta Kulichkova	3	7	6

==== Sixth qualifier ====
First round
6	(Russia) Alla Kudryavtseva	6	6
(Romania) Andreea Mitu	3	2
WC	(Turkey) Başak Eraydın	4	6	7^{7}
8	(Czech Republic) Tereza Smitková	6	2	6^{3}

Qualifying competition
6	(Russia) Alla Kudryavtseva	4	6	2
WC	(Turkey) Başak Eraydın	6	4	6
