= 2016 İstanbul Cup =

- Date: 18–24 April
- Edition: 9th
- Category: WTA International
- Draw: 32S / 16D
- Prize money: $250,000
- Surface: Clay
- Location: Istanbul, Turkey
- Venue: Garanti Koza Arena

Champions

Singles
- (Turkey) Çağla Büyükakçay

Doubles
- (Romania) Andreea Mitu / (Turkey) İpek Soylu
← 2015 ·	İstanbul Cup	· 2017 →

The 2016 İstanbul Cup (also known as the TEB BNP Paribas İstanbul Cup for sponsorship reasons) was a women's tennis tournament played on outdoor clay courts. It was the 9th edition of the İstanbul Cup, and part of the WTA International tournaments of the 2016 WTA Tour. It took place at the Garanti Koza Arena in Istanbul, Turkey, from 18 April through 24 April 2016. Unseeded Çağla Büyükakçay won the singles title.

== Security concerns and withdrawals ==
Due to the tense security situation in Turkey following a number of terrorist attacks in February and March the WTA allowed registered players to withdraw from the tournament without penalty. Additionally, the players were given the opportunity to register at short notice for another tournament, such as the Stuttgart Open in Germany, a premier tournament held in the same week.

== Finals ==
=== Singles ===
(Turkey) Çağla Büyükakçay defeated (Montenegro) Danka Kovinić, 3–6, 6–2, 6–3

- It was Büyükakçay's only WTA singles title of her career.

=== Doubles ===
(Romania) Andreea Mitu / (Turkey) İpek Soylu defeated (Switzerland) Xenia Knoll / (Montenegro) Danka Kovinić, walkover

== Points and prize money ==
Event	W	F	SF	QF	Round of 16	Round of 32	Q	Q2	Q1
Singles	280	180	110	60	30	1	18	12	1
Doubles	280	180	110	60	1	—	—	—	—

=== Prize money ===
Event	W	F	SF	QF	Round of 16	Round of 32	Q2	Q1
Singles	$43,000	$21,400	$11,500	$6,175	$3,400	$2,100	$1,020	$600
Doubles	$12,300	$6,400	$3,435	$1,820	$960	—	—	—

== Singles main-draw entrants ==
=== Seeds ===
Country	Player	Rank^{1}	Seed
SVK	Anna Karolína Schmiedlová	34	1
BEL	Yanina Wickmayer	42	2
UKR	Lesia Tsurenko	43	3
BEL	Kirsten Flipkens	59	4
MNE	Danka Kovinić	61	5
JPN	Nao Hibino	66	6
UKR	Kateryna Bondarenko	67	7
SWE	Johanna Larsson	69	8

- Rankings are as of April 11, 2016.

=== Other entrants ===
The following players received wildcards into the singles main draw:

- (Turkey) Ayla Aksu
- (Turkey) İpek Soylu
- (Ukraine) Dayana Yastremska

The following players received entry from the qualifying draw:

- (Romania) Sorana Cîrstea
- (Hungary) Réka-Luca Jani
- (Slovakia) Kristína Kučová
- (Russia) Marina Melnikova
- (Greece) Maria Sakkari
- (Ukraine) Maryna Zanevska

=== Withdrawals ===
Before the tournament

Due to security concerns, the WTA allowed players to withdraw and enter other WTA/ITF tournaments without penalty.

- (Belarus) Victoria Azarenka → replaced by (Romania) Alexandra Dulgheru
- (Czech Republic) Petra Cetkovská → replaced by (Turkey) Çağla Büyükakçay
- (United States) Irina Falconi → replaced by (Switzerland) Stefanie Vögele
- (Italy) Camila Giorgi (entered Stuttgart qualifying) → replaced by (Bulgaria) Tsvetana Pironkova
- (Czech Republic) Lucie Hradecká → replaced by (Croatia) Donna Vekić
- (Kazakhstan) Yulia Putintseva → replaced by (Ukraine) Kateryna Kozlova
- (United Kingdom) Laura Robson (entered Stuttgart qualifying) → replaced by (Japan) Kurumi Nara
- (Kazakhstan) Yaroslava Shvedova → replaced by (Latvia) Anastasija Sevastova
- (Belgium) Alison Van Uytvanck → replaced by (Belarus) Olga Govortsova
- (United Kingdom) Heather Watson → replaced by (Belarus) Aliaksandra Sasnovich
- (Denmark) Caroline Wozniacki (ankle injury) → replaced by (Romania) Andreea Mitu

== Doubles main-draw entrants ==
=== Seeds ===
Country	Player	Country	Player	Rank^{1}	Seed
UKR	Kateryna Bondarenko	UKR	Olga Savchuk	89	1
GEO	Oksana Kalashnikova	SWE	Johanna Larsson	96	2
SUI	Xenia Knoll	MNE	Danka Kovinić	201	3
RUS	Valentyna Ivakhnenko	BLR	Lidziya Marozava	219	4

- ^{1} Rankings as of April 11, 2016.

=== Other entrants ===
The following pairs received wildcards into the doubles main draw:

- (Turkey) Ayla Aksu / (Turkey) Melis Sezer
- (Turkey) Çağla Büyükakçay / (Slovakia) Anna Karolína Schmiedlová

=== Withdrawals ===
During the tournament

- (Japan) Nao Hibino (right shoulder injury)
- (Montenegro) Danka Kovinić (right hamstring strain)

=== Retirements ===
- (Ukraine) Maryna Zanevska (left shoulder injury)
