= 2015 İstanbul Cup =

- Date: 20–27 July
- Edition: 8th
- Category: WTA International
- Draw: 32S / 16D
- Prize money: $250,000
- Surface: Hard
- Location: Istanbul, Turkey

Champions

Singles
- (Ukraine) Lesia Tsurenko

Doubles
- (Russia) Daria Gavrilova / (Ukraine) Elina Svitolina
| ← 2014 · | İstanbul Cup | · 2016 → |

The 2015 İstanbul Cup (also known as the TEB BNP Paribas İstanbul Cup for sponsorship reasons) was a tennis tournament played on outdoor hard courts. It was the 8th edition of the İstanbul Cup, and part of the WTA International tournaments of the 2015 WTA Tour. It took place in Istanbul, Turkey, from 20 July through 27 July 2015. Unseeded Lesia Tsurenko won the singles title.

== Finals ==
=== Singles ===
(Ukraine) Lesia Tsurenko defeated (Poland) Urszula Radwańska, 7–5, 6–1

- It was Tsurenko's only singles title of the year and the 1st of her career.

=== Doubles ===
(Russia) Daria Gavrilova / (Ukraine) Elina Svitolina defeated (Turkey) Çağla Büyükakçay / (Serbia) Jelena Janković, 5–7, 6–1, [10–4]

== Points and prize money ==
| Event | W | F | SF | QF | Round of 16 | Round of 32 | Q | Q2 | Q1 |
| Singles | 280 | 180 | 110 | 60 | 30 | 1 | 18 | 12 | 1 |
| Doubles | 280 | 180 | 110 | 60 | 1 | — | — | — | — |

=== Prize money ===
| Event | W | F | SF | QF | Round of 16 | Round of 32 | Q2 | Q1 |
| Singles | $43,000 | $21,400 | $11,500 | $6,175 | $3,400 | $2,100 | $1,020 | $600 |
| Doubles | $12,300 | $6,400 | $3,435 | $1,820 | $960 | — | — | — |

== Singles main-draw entrants ==
=== Seeds ===
| Country | Player | Rank^{1} | Seed |
|---|---|---|---|
| USA | Venus Williams | 15 | 1 |
| UKR | Elina Svitolina | 17 | 2 |
| SRB | Jelena Janković | 25 | 3 |
| FRA | Alizé Cornet | 28 | 4 |
| ITA | Camila Giorgi | 31 | 5 |
| RUS | Daria Gavrilova | 39 | 6 |
| RUS | Anastasia Pavlyuchenkova | 40 | 7 |
| BUL | Tsvetana Pironkova | 42 | 8 |

- Rankings are as of July 13, 2015.

=== Other entrants ===
The following players received wildcards into the singles main draw:

- (Turkey) Çağla Büyükakçay
- (France) Alizé Cornet
- (Turkey) İpek Soylu

The following players received entry from the qualifying draw:

- (Ukraine) Kateryna Bondarenko
- (Russia) Margarita Gasparyan
- (Latvia) Jeļena Ostapenko
- (Russia) Alexandra Panova
- (Ukraine) Olga Savchuk
- (United States) Anna Tatishvili

=== Withdrawals ===
Before the tournament

- (Switzerland) Belinda Bencic → replaced by (Kazakhstan) Yaroslava Shvedova
- (Romania) Alexandra Dulgheru → replaced by (Belgium) Yanina Wickmayer
- (France) Kristina Mladenovic → replaced by (Belgium) Kirsten Flipkens
- (Romania) Monica Niculescu → replaced by (Russia) Elizaveta Kulichkova
- (Italy) Flavia Pennetta → replaced by (Russia) Vitalia Diatchenko

=== Retirements ===
- (United States) Anna Tatishvili

== Doubles main-draw entrants ==
=== Seeds ===
| Country | Player | Country | Player | Rank^{1} | Seed |
|---|---|---|---|---|---|
| CZE | Andrea Hlaváčková | RUS | Anastasia Pavlyuchenkova | 44 | 1 |
| RUS | Margarita Gasparyan | RUS | Alexandra Panova | 133 | 2 |
| GEO | Oksana Kalashnikova | UKR | Nadiia Kichenok | 151 | 3 |
| RUS | Vitalia Diatchenko | UKR | Olga Savchuk | 170 | 4 |

- ^{1} Rankings as of July 6, 2015.

=== Other entrants ===
The following pairs received wildcards into the doublesmain draw:

- (Turkey) Ayla Aksu / (Turkey) Melis Sezer
- (Estonia) Anett Kontaveit / (Russia) Elizaveta Kulichkova

The following pair received entry as alternates:

- (Russia) Daria Gavrilova / (Ukraine) Elina Svitolina

=== Withdrawals ===
Before the tournament

- (United States) Anna Tatishvili
