= Tetyana Arefyeva =

Ukrainian tennis player

Tetyana Arefyeva Тетяна Арефиева
- Country (sports): Ukraine
- Born: 9 March 1991 (age 34); Kyiv, Ukraine
- Turned pro: 2005
- Plays: Right-handed (two-handed backhand)
- Prize money: $95,893

Singles
- Career record: 188–170
- Career titles: 2 ITF
- Highest ranking: No. 241 (19 March 2012)

Doubles
- Career record: 76–85
- Career titles: 2 ITF
- Highest ranking: No. 182 (29 August 2011)

Tetyana Serhiivna Arefyeva (Ukrainian: Тетяна Сергіївна Арефиева) is a Ukrainian former tennis player. In her career, she won two singles and two doubles titles at tournaments of the ITF Women's Circuit.

Arefyeva began tennis at the age of six and was coached by Igor Dernovskyy. In 2005, she played her first professional match at a $10k tournament in Kyiv where she had received a wildcard.

In 2006, Tetyana played in Kyiv once more, this time advancing past the first round, before losing to Agnese Zucchini in three sets. She also played in Kharkiv and Volos. She qualified for Kharkiv and received a wildcard into Volos. She played in the qualifying draws of all the ITF events in Cairo. She fell in qualifying for all three of them but she won two doubles matches in Cairo.

Arefyeva played lots more tournaments on the ITF Circuit 2007, reaching a quarterfinal at Tampere in Finland. She finished the year ranked at 769. In doubles, Tetyana teamed with Elena Jirnova to reach the final at Gausdal in Norway.

In February 2008, she won her first ITF title at Melilla in Spain. She also reached finals in Astana and Athens but lost to Alice Moroni and Zarina Diyas, respectively. She also reached a final in Arezzo but lost in straight sets. She ended the year ranked 613 in singles and 727 in doubles.

In 2009, Arefyeva became 18 and began a series of successful results. In Portimão in Portugal, she reached the semifinals defeating Stéphanie Vongsouthi en route. She completed back-to-back finals at Antalya and Almaty. She lost in Turkey to Irini Georgatou but won in Almaty, defeating Daria Kuchmina. At a $25k event in Namangan, Uzbekistan, Tetyana reached the final by defeating Ksenia Palkina, Çağla Büyükakçay and Sofia Kvatsabaia. She was defeated in the final by Kristina Antoniychuk, 6–0, 6–1.

== ITF Circuit finals ==
Legend
$50,000 tournaments
$25,000 tournaments
$10,000 tournaments

=== Singles: 7 (2 titles, 5 runner-ups) ===
Result	No.	Date	Tournament	Surface	Opponent	Score
Win	1.	23 February 2008	ITF Melilla, Spain	Hard	(Bulgaria) Dessislava Mladenova	6–1, 7–6
Loss	2.	24 March 2008	ITF Athens, Greece	Hard	(Italy) Alice Moroni	3–6, 4–6
Loss	3.	17 November 2008	ITF Astana, Kazakhstan	Hard	(Kazakhstan) Zarina Diyas	5–7, 4–6
Loss	4.	13 April 2009	ITF Antalya, Turkey	Hard	(Greece) Eirini Georgatou	3–6, 7–6, 5–7
Win	5.	20 April 2009	ITF Almaty, Kazakhstan	Hard	(Russia) Daria Kuchmina	6–2, 6–1
Loss	6.	27 April 2009	ITF Namangan, Uzbekistan	Hard	(Ukraine) Kristina Antoniychuk	0–6, 1–6
Loss	7.	25 April 2011	ITF Qarshi, Uzbekistan	Hard	(Australia) Isabella Holland	5–7, 4–6

=== Doubles: 9 (2 titles, 7 runner-ups) ===
Result	No.	Date	Tournament	Surface	Partner	Opponents	Score
Loss	1.	22 July 2007	ITF Gausdal, Norway	Hard	(Ukraine) Elena Jirnova	(Slovenia) Maja Kambič (Slovenia) Petra Pajalič	6–7^{(3)}, 7–5, 3–6
Loss	2.	11 February 2008	ITF Arezzo, Italy	Clay	(Belgium) Aude Vermoezen	(Italy) Giulia Gatto-Monticone (Italy) Federica Quercia	5–7, 1–6
Loss	3.	13 April 2009	ITF Antalya, Turkey	Hard	(Ukraine) Anastasiya Lytovchenko	(Turkey) Çağla Büyükakçay (Turkey) Pemra Özgen	4–6, 2–6
Win	4.	20 April 2009	ITF Almaty, Kazakhstan	Hard	(Ukraine) Anastasiya Lytovchenko	(Belarus) Ima Bohush (Russia) Eugeniya Pashkova	6–4, 6–4
Loss	5.	28 June 2010	ITF Ystad, Sweden	Clay	(Ukraine) Anastasiya Lytovchenko	(Bosnia and Herzegovina) Mervana Jugić-Salkić (Finland) Emma Laine	1–6, 1–6
Loss	6.	1 November 2010	Ismaning Open, Germany	Carpet (i)	(Ukraine) Yuliana Fedak	(Germany) Kristina Barrois (Germany) Anna-Lena Grönefeld	1–6, 6–7^{(3)}
Loss	7.	6 December 2010	ITF Dubai, United Arab Emirates	Hard	(Ukraine) Yuliana Fedak	(Russia) Elena Chalova (Kyrgyzstan) Ksenia Palkina	2–6, 4–6
Win	8.	25 April 2011	ITF Qarshi, Uzbekistan	Hard	(Russia) Eugeniya Pashkova	(Australia) Isabella Holland (United Kingdom) Naomi Broady	6–7^{(1)}, 7–5, [10–7]
Loss	9.	11 March 2013	ITF Orlando, United States	Clay	(Czech Republic) Kateřina Kramperová	(Czech Republic) Nikola Fraňková (Brazil) Nathalia Rossi	5–7, 6–2, [8–10]
