= Ria Sabay =

German tennis player

- Country (sports): Germany
- Born: 26 September 1985 (age 40)
- Turned pro: 2004
- Retired: 2013
- Plays: Right (two-handed backhand)
- Prize money: $28,484

Singles
- Career record: 71–83
- Highest ranking: No. 347 (25 February 2008)

Doubles
- Career record: 64–69
- Career titles: 5 ITF
- Highest ranking: No. 238 (12 May 2008)

Ria Sabay (née Dörnemann; born 26 September 1985) is a German former tennis player.

She won five doubles titles on the ITF Women's Circuit in her career. On 25 February 2008, she reached her best singles ranking of world No. 347. On 12 May 2008, she peaked at No. 238 in the doubles rankings. Sabay made her WTA tour debut at the 2006 Nordic Light Open. Sabay retired from professional tennis in 2013.

== ITF Circuit finals ==
=== Singles (0–1) ===
Legend $25,000 tournaments $10,000 tournaments	Finals by surface Hard (0–1) Clay (0–0)

Outcome	Date	Tournament	Surface	Opponent	Score
Runner-up	3 June 2007	Istanbul, Turkey	Hard	(Turkey) Çağla Büyükakçay	4–6, 3–6

=== Doubles (5–4) ===
Legend $25,000 tournaments $10,000 tournaments	Finals by surface Hard (3–4) Clay (2–0)

Outcome	No.	Date	Tournament	Surface	Partner	Opponents	Score
Winner	1.	14 March 2006	Sheffield, United Kingdom	Hard (i)	(Germany) Andrea Sieveke	(United Kingdom) Melissa Berry (United Kingdom) Lindsay Cox	7–6^{(7)}, 6–3
Winner	2.	28 August 2006	Istanbul, Turkey	Hard	(United Kingdom) Emily Webley-Smith	(Ukraine) Irina Khatsko (Ukraine) Mariya Malkhasyan	w/o
Winner	3.	18 September 2006	Tbilisi, Georgia	Clay	(Kyrgyzstan) Ksenia Palkina	(Russia) Varvara Galanina (Armenia) Liudmila Nikoyan	6–4, 3–6, 6–0
Runner-up	1.	14 March 2007	Sunderland, UK	Hard (i)	(United Kingdom) Emily Webley-Smith	(United Kingdom) Anna Hawkins (United Kingdom) Jane O'Donoghue	4–6, 7–6^{(5)}, 3–6
Runner-up	2.	9 April 2007	Dubai, United Arab Emirates	Hard	(Turkey) Pemra Özgen	(Ukraine) Kateryna Avdiyenko (Russia) Kristina Grigorian	2–6, 1–6
Winner	4.	2 June 2007	Istanbul, Turkey	Hard	(Turkey) Çağla Büyükakçay	(Slovenia) Maja Kambič (Russia) Avgusta Tsybysheva	6–2, 6–4
Runner-up	3.	3 July 2007	Valladolid, Spain	Hard	(Germany) Justine Ozga	(Spain) Nuria Llagostera Vives (Spain) Arantxa Parra Santonja	0–6, 2–6
Runner-up	4.	30 July 2007	Vigo, Spain	Hard	(Germany) Justine Ozga	(Spain) Estrella Cabeza Candela (Spain) Carla Suárez Navarro	1–6, 6–4, 3–6
Winner	5.	17 September 2007	Telavi Open, Georgia	Clay	(Kyrgyzstan) Ksenia Palkina	(Russia) Vasilisa Davydova (Russia) Marina Shamayko	6–2, 6–2
