= Avgusta Tsybysheva =

Russian tennis player

- Country (sports): Russia
- Born: 14 August 1988 (age 37)
- Turned pro: 2006
- Retired: 2014
- Plays: Right (two-handed backhand)
- Prize money: $32,495

Singles
- Career record: 91–107
- Career titles: 1 ITF
- Highest ranking: No. 423 (14 June 2010)

Doubles
- Career record: 86–87
- Career titles: 8 ITF
- Highest ranking: No. 379 (24 March 2008)

Avgusta Tsybysheva (born 14 August 1988) is a Russian former tennis player.

In her career, Tsybysheva won one singles title and eight doubles titles on the ITF Women's Circuit. On 14 June 2010, she reached her best singles ranking of world No. 423. On 24 March 2008, she peaked at No. 379 in the doubles rankings.

Tsybysheva made her WTA Tour main-draw debut at the 2008 İstanbul Cup in the doubles event, partnering Anastasia Poltoratskaya.

== ITF Circuit finals ==
=== Singles (1–0) ===
Legend $10,000 tournaments	Finals by surface Hard (1–0)

Result	Date	Location	Surface	Opponent	Score
Win	26 July 2009	Istanbul, Turkey	Hard	(Portugal) Magali de Lattre	6–2, 4–6, 6–4

=== Doubles (8–8) ===
Legend $25,000 tournaments $10,000 tournaments	Finals by surface Hard (3–4) Clay (5–4)

Outcome	No.	Date	Location	Surface	Partner	Opponents	Score
Runner-up	1.	27 May 2007	Istanbul, Turkey	Hard	(Slovenia) Maja Kambič	(Turkey) Çağla Büyükakçay (Germany) Ria Dörnemann	2–6, 4–6
Winner	1.	3 September 2007	Baku, Azerbaijan	Clay	(Russia) Vasilisa Davydova	(Ukraine) Lesia Tsurenko (Ukraine) Kateryna Yergina	7–5, 4–6, [10–7]
Winner	2.	10 September 2007	Tbilisi, Georgia	Clay	(Georgia (country)) Manana Shapakidze	(Georgia (country)) Tinatin Kavlashvili (Georgia (country)) Sofia Shapatava	6–1, 1–6, [10–8]
Runner-up	2.	31 March 2008	Antalya, Turkey	Clay	(Russia) Eugeniya Pashkova	(Romania) Simona Matei (Italy) Valentina Sulpizio	2–6, 7–5, [4–10]
Runner-up	3.	28 July 2008	Rabat, Morocco	Clay	(Georgia (country)) Sofia Kvatsabaia	(Morocco) Fatima El Allami (Switzerland) Lisa Sabino	0–6, 3–6
Winner	3.	30 March 2009	Antalya, Turkey	Hard	(Georgia (country)) Sofia Kvatsabaia	(Belarus) Ima Bohush (Russia) Maria Zharkova	6–4, 4–6, [10–8]
Runner-up	4.	6 April 2009	Antalya, Turkey	Hard	(Georgia (country)) Sofia Kvatsabaia	(United Kingdom) Anna Fitzpatrick (Denmark) Hanne Skak Jensen	6–7^{(3)}, 6–2, [7–10]
Runner-up	5.	11 May 2009	St. Petersburg, Russia	Hard	(Russia) Maria Zharkova	(Russia) Yuliya Kalabina (Russia) Marta Sirotkina	1–6, 2–6
Winner	4.	14 July 2009	İzmir, Turkey	Hard	(Georgia (country)) Sofia Kvatsabaia	(Czech Republic) Zuzana Linhová (Poland) Sandra Zaniewska	6–0, 3–6, [10–5]
Runner-up	6.	21 July 2009	Istanbul, Turkey	Hard	(Georgia (country)) Sofia Kvatsabaia	(Turkey) Pemra Özgen (Georgia (country)) Manana Shapakidze	2–6, 2–6
Winner	5.	15 September 2009	Lleida, Spain	Clay	(Georgia (country)) Sofia Kvatsabaia	(Mexico) Ximena Hermoso (Spain) Garbiñe Muguruza	6–3, 6–2
Winner	6.	8 February 2010	Mallorca, Spain	Clay	(Georgia (country)) Sofia Kvatsabaia	(Italy) Benedetta Davato (Spain) Inés Ferrer Suárez	7–6^{(6)}, 6–4
Winner	7.	10 May 2010	Tortosa, Spain	Clay	(Chile) Camila Silva	(Spain) Montserrat Blasco Fernández (Spain) Arabela Fernández Rabener	6–1, 6–3
Runner-up	7.	1 November 2010	Mallorca, Spain	Clay	(Portugal) Maria João Koehler	(Spain) Lara Arruabarrena (Spain) Inés Ferrer Suárez	5–7, 2–6
Runner-up	8.	15 November 2010	Mallorca, Spain	Clay	(Portugal) Maria João Koehler	(Romania) Diana Enache (Romania) Raluca Elena Platon	3–6, 6–7^{(3)}
Winner	8.	12 May 2014	Sousse, Tunisia	Hard	(Slovakia) Chantal Škamlová	(Spain) Olga Parres Azcoitia (Spain) Nuria Párrizas Díaz	6–3, 6–2
