= 2015 İstanbul Cup – Singles =

Singles
- 2015 İstanbul Cup

Final
- Champion: (Ukraine) Lesia Tsurenko
- Runner-up: (Poland) Urszula Radwańska
- Score: 7–5, 6–1

Details
- Draw: 32
- Seeds: 8

Events
Singles	Doubles
- İstanbul Cup

Caroline Wozniacki was the defending champion, but she chose not to participate this year.

Lesia Tsurenko won the title, defeating Urszula Radwańska in the final 7–5, 6–1. It was her first WTA Tour title.

== Seeds ==
1. (United States) Venus Williams (first round)
2. (Ukraine) Elina Svitolina (first round)
3. (Serbia) Jelena Janković (first round)
4. (France) Alizé Cornet (second round)
5. (Italy) Camila Giorgi (second round)
6. (Russia) Daria Gavrilova (first round)
7. (Russia) Anastasia Pavlyuchenkova (first round)
8. (Bulgaria) Tsvetana Pironkova (quarterfinals)

== Draw ==
Key

- Q = Qualifier
- WC = Wild card
- LL = Lucky loser
- Alt = Alternate
- ITF = ITF entry
- PR = Protected ranking
- SR = Special ranking
- SE = Special exempt
- JE = Junior exempt
- JR = Junior Accelerator Programme entrant
- CO = College Accelerator Programme entrant
- NG = Next Gen Accelerator Program entrant
- w/o = Walkover
- r = Retired
- d = Defaulted

=== Finals ===
Semifinals
(Ukraine) Lesia Tsurenko	6	6
(Belgium) Kirsten Flipkens	4	2
(Poland) Urszula Radwańska	6	4	6
(Slovakia) Magdaléna Rybáriková	3	6	3

Final
(Ukraine) Lesia Tsurenko	7	6
(Poland) Urszula Radwańska	5	1

=== Top half ===
First round
1	(United States) V Williams	4	6^{4}
Q	(Ukraine) K Bondarenko	6	7^{7}
Q	(Ukraine) O Savchuk	3	5
(Germany) M Barthel	6	7
WC	(Turkey) Ç Büyükakçay	6	3	2
(Slovakia) D Hantuchová	4	6	6
(Ukraine) L Tsurenko	7^{7}	3	6
6	(Russia) D Gavrilova	6^{2}	6	3
4/WC	(France) A Cornet	6	7
(Belgium) Y Wickmayer	3	5
Q	(Latvia) J Ostapenko	2	0
(Belgium) K Flipkens	6	6
(Italy) F Schiavone	6	6
(Bulgaria) S Karatantcheva	0	1
(Slovakia) D Cibulková	5	7	6^{4}
5	(Italy) C Giorgi	7	5	7^{7}

Second round
Q	(Ukraine) K Bondarenko	6	4	6
(Germany) M Barthel	3	6	2
(Slovakia) D Hantuchová	1	1
(Ukraine) L Tsurenko	6	6
4/WC	(France) A Cornet	6	1	2
(Belgium) K Flipkens	2	6	6
(Italy) F Schiavone	6	7^{8}
5	(Italy) C Giorgi	4	6^{6}

Quarterfinals
Q	(Ukraine) K Bondarenko	6^{13}	5
(Ukraine) L Tsurenko	7^{15}	7
(Belgium) K Flipkens	6	6
(Italy) F Schiavone	2	4

Semifinals
(Ukraine) L Tsurenko	6	6
(Belgium) K Flipkens	4	2

=== Bottom half ===
First round
8	(Bulgaria) T Pironkova	0	7^{7}	7^{7}
Q	(Russia) M Gasparyan	6	6^{4}	6^{3}
(Japan) K Nara	6	7^{9}
(Russia) V Diatchenko	4	6^{7}
(Kazakhstan) Y Shvedova	7	3	4
(Serbia) B Jovanovski	5	6	6
(Poland) U Radwańska	6	3	6
3	(Serbia) J Janković	4	6	2
7	(Russia) A Pavlyuchenkova	2	1
(Italy) R Vinci	6	6
Q	(Russia) A Panova	6	2	6
(Russia) E Kulichkova	4	6	1
Q	(United States) A Tatishvili	7	5	0^{r}
WC	(Turkey) İ Soylu	5	7	2
(Slovakia) M Rybáriková	6	6
2	(Ukraine) E Svitolina	1	3

Second round
8	(Bulgaria) T Pironkova	6	1	6
(Japan) K Nara	3	6	1
(Serbia) B Jovanovski	3	2
(Poland) U Radwańska	6	6
(Italy) R Vinci	7^{7}	6
Q	(Russia) A Panova	6^{3}	3
WC	(Turkey) İ Soylu	0	0
(Slovakia) M Rybáriková	6	6

Quarterfinals
8	(Bulgaria) T Pironkova	2	6	6^{5}
(Poland) U Radwańska	6	3	7^{7}
(Italy) R Vinci	6	5	2
(Slovakia) M Rybáriková	0	7	6

Semifinals
(Poland) U Radwańska	6	4	6
(Slovakia) M Rybáriková	3	6	3

== Qualifying ==
=== Seeds ===
1. (Russia) Elizaveta Kulichkova (moved to main draw)
2. (Czech Republic) Kristýna Plíšková (first round)
3. (Russia) Margarita Gasparyan (qualified)
4. (Ukraine) Kateryna Bondarenko (qualified)
5. (China) Zhu Lin (qualifying competition)
6. (Latvia) Jeļena Ostapenko (qualified)
7. (United States) Anna Tatishvili (qualified)
8. (Russia) Alexandra Panova (qualified)
9. (Japan) Misa Eguchi (first round)
10. (Czech Republic) Andrea Hlaváčková (qualifying competition)
11. (Estonia) Anett Kontaveit (first round)
12. (China) Yang Zhaoxuan (first round)
13. (Ukraine) Yuliya Beygelzimer (first round)

=== Qualifiers ===
1. (Russia) Alexandra Panova
2. (Ukraine) Olga Savchuk
3. (Russia) Margarita Gasparyan
4. (Ukraine) Kateryna Bondarenko
5. (United States) Anna Tatishvili
6. (Latvia) Jeļena Ostapenko

=== Draw ===
==== First qualifier ====
First round
13	(Ukraine) Yuliya Beygelzimer	1	6	4
WC	(Turkey) Berfu Cengiz	6	3	6
(Italy) Alberta Brianti	3	7^{8}	2
8	(Russia) Alexandra Panova	6	6^{6}	6

Qualifying competition
WC	(Turkey) Berfu Cengiz	1	3
8	(Russia) Alexandra Panova	6	6

==== Second qualifier ====
First round
2	(Czech Republic) Kristýna Plíšková	3	6	4
WC	(Australia) Sara Tomic	6	4	6
Alt	(Ukraine) Olga Savchuk	6	6
12	(China) Yang Zhaoxuan	3	3

Qualifying competition
WC	(Australia) Sara Tomic	6	3	3
Alt	(Ukraine) Olga Savchuk	3	6	6

==== Third qualifier ====
First round
3	(Russia) Margarita Gasparyan	6	6
(Croatia) Tereza Mrdeža	1	3
WC	(Turkey) Ayla Aksu	7^{7}	4	6^{1}
10	(Czech Republic) Andrea Hlaváčková	6^{1}	6	7^{7}

Qualifying competition
3	(Russia) Margarita Gasparyan	7	6
10	(Czech Republic) Andrea Hlaváčková	5	1

==== Fourth qualifier ====
First round
4	(Ukraine) Kateryna Bondarenko	6	6
(Japan) Hiroko Kuwata	3	2
(Italy) Nastassja Burnett	3	6	6
9	(Japan) Misa Eguchi	6	1	0

Qualifying competition
4	(Ukraine) Kateryna Bondarenko	3	6	6
(Italy) Nastassja Burnett	6	3	0

==== Fifth qualifier ====
First round
5	(China) Zhu Lin	6	6
(Uzbekistan) Akgul Amanmuradova	1	0
(United States) Grace Min	3	2
7	(United States) Anna Tatishvili	6	6

Qualifying competition
5	(China) Zhu Lin	2	2
7	(United States) Anna Tatishvili	6	6

==== Sixth qualifier ====
First round
6	(Latvia) Jeļena Ostapenko	2
(Ukraine) Nadiia Kichenok	0^{r}
WC	(Turkey) Melis Sezer	4	6	6
11	(Estonia) Anett Kontaveit	6	1	3

Qualifying competition
6	(Latvia) Jeļena Ostapenko	6	6
WC	(Turkey) Melis Sezer	2	2
