= Ksenia Palkina =

Kyrgyzstani tennis player

Ksenia Palkina Ксения Палкина Улукан
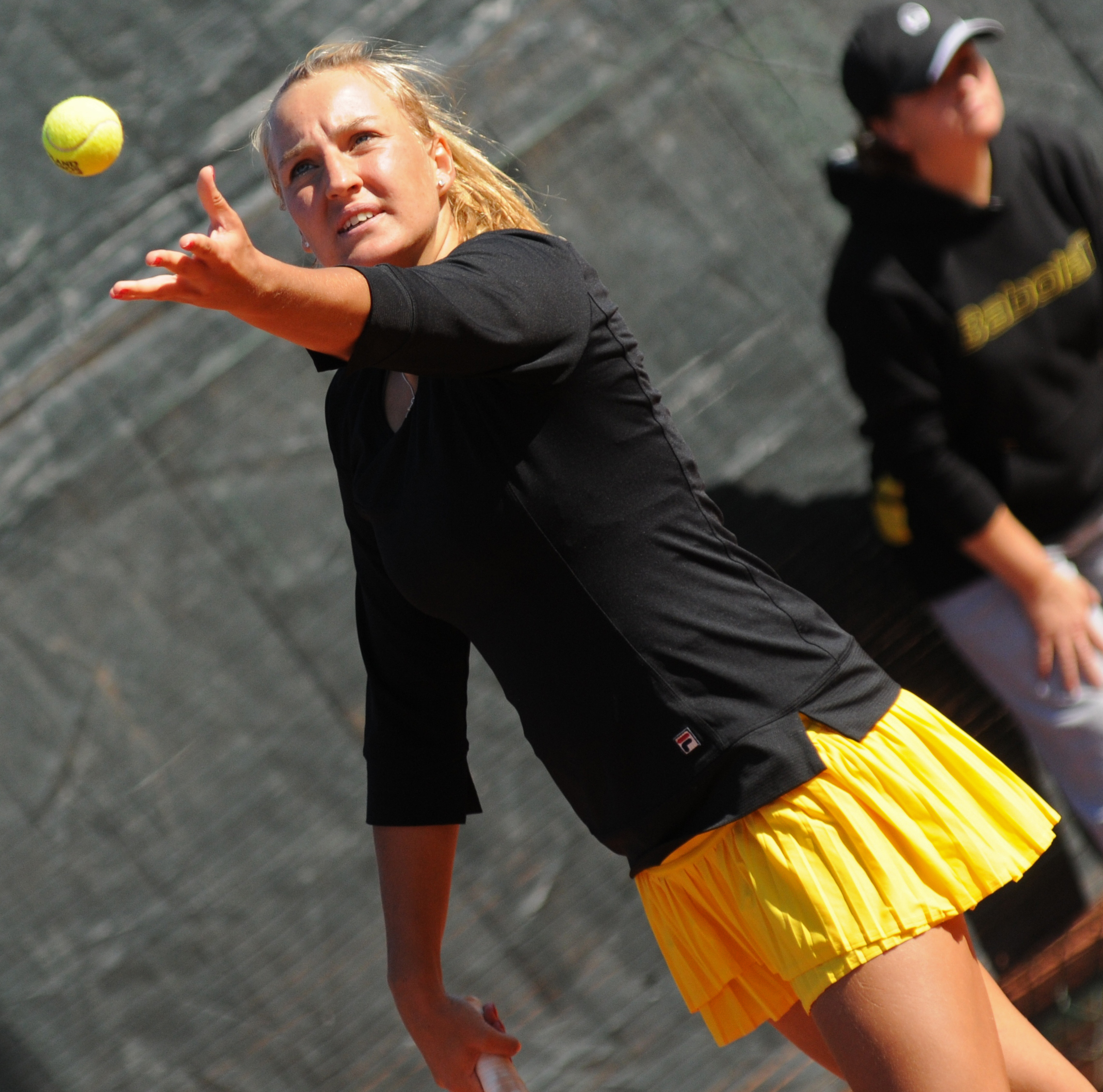
- Country (sports): Kyrgyzstan
- Residence: Bishkek, Kyrgyzstan
- Born: 13 December 1989 (age 36) Komsomolsk-on-Amur, Khabarovsk Krai, Soviet Union
- Height: 1.74 m (5 ft 9 in)
- Turned pro: September 2008
- Retired: 2019
- Plays: Right (two-handed backhand)
- Prize money: $221,121

Singles
- Career record: 379–316
- Career titles: 11 ITF
- Highest ranking: No. 163 (23 March 2009)

Grand Slam singles results
- Australian Open: Q2 (2009)
- French Open: Q1 (2009)
- Wimbledon: Q2 (2009)
- US Open: Q1 (2008, 2009)

Doubles
- Career record: 320–231
- Career titles: 27 ITF
- Highest ranking: No. 164 (12 April 2010)

Ksenia Palkina (Russian: Ксения Палкина Улукан or Ksenia Palkina Ulukan; born 13 December 1989) is a Russian-born Kyrgyzstani former tennis player. Palkina won 11 singles titles and 27 doubles titles on the ITF Women's Circuit. On 23 March 2009, she reached her career-high singles ranking of world No. 163. On 12 April 2010, she peaked at No. 164 in the WTA doubles rankings.

== Personal life ==
Palkina was born in Khabarovsk Krai to mother Marina and father Nikolay, and has a brother named Nikita. Her favourite surface is clay.

As of November 2019, Palkina has been provisionally suspended by the Tennis Integrity Unit. Ksenia Palkina has been banned from tennis for 16 years, six years of which is suspended. She has also been fined $100,000 (with $87,500 suspended) after admitting breaching the rules of the Tennis Anti-Corruption Program (TACP).

== ITF Circuit finals ==
$50/60,000 tournaments
$25,000 tournaments
$15,000 tournaments
$10,000 tournaments

=== Singles: 17 (11 titles, 6 runner-ups) ===
Result	No.	Date	Tournament	Surface	Opponent	Score
Loss	1.	28 January 2006	ITF New Delhi, India	Hard	(India) Ankita Bhambri	4–6, 3–6
Win	1.	5 February 2006	ITF Muzaffarnagar, India	Grass	(India) Meghha Vakaria	6–2, 7–6^{(4)}
Loss	2.	11 August 2007	ITF Moscow, Russia	Clay	(Russia) Anna Lapushchenkova	4–6, 3–6
Win	2.	27 April 2008	ITF Namangan, Uzbekistan	Hard	(Russia) Maria Kondratieva	6–0, 3–6, 6–3
Win	3.	22 June 2008	ITF Torino, Italy	Clay	(Italy) Giulia Gatto-Monticone	6–0, 6–4
Loss	3.	29 June 2008	ITF Padova, Italy	Clay	(Croatia) Nika Ožegović	5–7, 3–6
Loss	4.	15 February 2009	ITF Mildura, Australia	Grass	(United States) Abigail Spears	7–5, 3–6, 2–6
Win	4.	27 March 2010	ITF Namangan, Uzbekistan	Hard	(Ukraine) Ganna Piven	3–6, 6–4, 6–4
Win	5.	23 April 2010	ITF Almaty, Kazakhstan	Hard (i)	(Russia) Eugeniya Pashkova	7–5, 4–6, 6–4
Loss	5.	5 May 2012	ITF Shymkent, Kazakhstan	Hard	(Russia) Sabina Kurbanova	2–6, 3–6
Win	6.	23 February 2013	ITF Shymkent, Kazakhstan	Hard (i)	(Uzbekistan) Sabina Sharipova	7–6^{(3)}, 7–6^{(3)}
Loss	6.	2 March 2013	ITF Shymkent, Kazakhstan	Hard (i)	(Russia) Ekaterina Yashina	3–6, 6–4, 2–6
Win	7.	11 May 2013	ITF Shymkent, Kazakhstan	Clay	(Kazakhstan) Kamila Kerimbayeva	6–3, 5–7, 6–1
Win	8.	22 September 2013	ITF Antalya, Turkey	Hard	(France) Caroline Roméo	6–3, 6–1
Win	9.	25 April 2015	ITF Shymkent, Kazakhstan	Clay	(Russia) Ksenija Sharifova	6–4, 6–4
Win	10.	17 May 2015	ITF Antalya, Turkey	Hard	(Turkey) Melis Sezer	4–6, 7–6^{(6)}, 6–2
Win	11.	22 September 2018	ITF Almaty, Kazakhstan	Clay	(Ukraine) Maryna Chernyshova	1–0 ret.

=== Doubles: 52 (27 titles, 25 runner-ups) ===
Outcome	No.	Date	Location	Surface	Partner	Opponents	Score
Runner–up	1.	29 October 2005	ITF Mumbai, India	Hard	(Italy) Nicole Clerico	(Thailand) Wilawan Choptang (Thailand) Thassha Vitayaviroj	7–5, 5–7, 3–6
Winner	1.	6 November 2005	ITF Pune, India	Hard	(Italy) Nicole Clerico	(India) Rushmi Chakravarthi (India) Sai Jayalakshmy Jayaram	7–5, 7–6^{(7)}
Winner	2.	28 January 2006	ITF New Delhi, India	Hard	(Italy) Nicole Clerico	(India) Ankita Bhambri (India) Rushmi Chakravarthi	w/o
Runner–up	2.	4 February 2006	ITF Muzaffarnagar, India	Grass	(Italy) Nicole Clerico	(Singapore) Lee Wei-ping (Indonesia) Lavinia Tananta	w/o
Winner	3.	11 July 2006	ITF Imola, Italy	Carpet	(Italy) Nicole Clerico	(Romania) Maria Luiza Craciun (Italy) Elena Vianello	6–3, 6–0
Winner	4.	18 September 2006	ITF Tbilisi, Georgia	Clay	(Germany) Ria Dörnemann	(Russia) Varvara Galanina (Armenia) Liudmila Nikoyan	6–4, 3–6, 6–0
Winner	5.	6 November 2006	ITF Pune, India	Hard	(India) Isha Lakhani	(India) Madura Ranganathan (Thailand) Nungnadda Wannasuk	6–3, 4–6, 6–4
Runner–up	3.	19 November 2006	ITF Pune, India	Clay	(Italy) Nicole Clerico	(Russia) Olga Panova (Romania) Ágnes Szatmári	2–6, 4–6
Runner–up	4.	3 March 2007	ITF Sant Boi, Spain	Clay	(Italy) Nicole Clerico	(Spain) Irene Rehberger Bescos (Spain) Nuria Sánchez García	6–4, 3–6, 4–6
Winner	6.	17 September 2007	Telavi Open, Georgia	Clay	(Germany) Ria Dörnemann	(Russia) Vasilisa Davydova (Russia) Marina Shamayko	6–2, 6–2
Runner–up	5.	5 May 2008	ITF Florence, Italy	Clay	(Italy) Martina Caciotti	(Hungary) Kyra Nagy (Italy) Valentina Sassi	2–6, 3–6
Winner	7.	11 August 2008	ITF Penza, Russia	Clay	(Georgia (country)) Sofia Shapatava	(Ukraine) Irina Buryachok (Czech Republic) Nikola Fraňková	6–4, 6–4
Winner	8.	1 May 2009	ITF Namangan, Uzbekistan	Hard	(Uzbekistan) Albina Khabibulina	(Turkey) Çağla Büyükakçay (Turkey) Pemra Özgen	6–4, 6–7^{(6)}, [10–5]
Runner–up	6.	5 June 2009	ITF Bukhara, Uzbekistan	Hard	(Australia) Arina Rodionova	(Sweden) Anna Brazhnikova (Russia) Marta Sirotkina	6–3, 4–6, [9–11]
Winner	9.	31 October 2009	ITF İstanbul, Turkey	Hard (i)	(Russia) Nina Bratchikova	(Czech Republic) Petra Cetkovská (Czech Republic) Renata Voráčová	w/o
Runner–up	7.	16 November 2009	ITF Pune, India	Hard	(Russia) Nina Bratchikova	(Ukraine) Anastasiya Vasylyeva (Italy) Nicole Clerico	6–4, 3–6, [11–13]
Runner-up	8.	19 April 2010	ITF Almaty, Kazakhstan	Hard (i)	(Turkmenistan) Anastasiya Prenko	(Russia) Eugeniya Pashkova (Russia) Maria Zharkova	6–3, 6–7^{(9)}, [7–10]
Winner	10.	30 July 2010	ITF Almaty, Kazakhstan	Hard	(Uzbekistan) Albina Khabibulina	(Ukraine) Yuliya Beygelzimer (United Kingdom) Emily Webley-Smith	6–4, 6–4
Runner–up	9.	14 August 2010	ITF Kazan, Russia	Hard	(Uzbekistan) Albina Khabibulina	(Belarus) Ekaterina Dzehalevich (Ukraine) Lesia Tsurenko	2–6, 3–6
Winner	11.	3 September 2010	ITF İstanbul, Turkey	Hard	(Denmark) Malou Ejdesgaard	(Belgium) Gally De Wael (Austria) Janina Toljan	6–4, 6–4
Winner	12.	6 December 2010	ITF Dubai, United Arab Emirates	Hard	(Russia) Elena Chalova	(Ukraine) Tetyana Arefyeva (Ukraine) Yuliana Fedak	6–2, 6–4
Runner–up	10.	2 May 2011	ITF Bukhara, Uzbekistan	Hard	(Russia) Nina Bratchikova	(South Korea) Han Sung-hee (China) Liang Chen	6–4, 6–7^{(5)}, [5–10]
Runner–up	11.	5 May 2012	ITF Shymkent, Kazakhstan	Hard	(Russia) Maya Gaverova	(Ukraine) Anastasiya Vasylyeva (Uzbekistan) Albina Khabibulina	6–3, 1–6, [6–10]
Runner–up	12.	22 September 2012	ITF Shymkent, Kazakhstan	Hard	(Uzbekistan) Nigina Abduraimova	(Ukraine) Valentyna Ivakhnenko (Ukraine) Kateryna Kozlova	2–6, 4–6
Runner–up	13.	2 November 2012	ITF İstanbul, Turkey	Hard (i)	(Uzbekistan) Nigina Abduraimova	(Turkey) Çağla Büyükakçay (Turkey) Pemra Özgen	2–6, 1–6
Winner	13.	18 March 2013	ITF Antalya, Turkey	Hard	(Georgia (country)) Oksana Kalashnikova	(United States) Anamika Bhargava (United States) Nicole Melichar	6–1, 6–3
Winner	14.	25 March 2013	ITF Antalya, Turkey	Hard	(Georgia (country)) Oksana Kalashnikova	(Turkey) Başak Eraydın (Australia) Abbie Myers	6–4, 4–6, [10–8]
Runner–up	14.	15 April 2013	ITF Namangan, Uzbekistan	Hard	(Ukraine) Valentyna Ivakhnenko	(Uzbekistan) Albina Khabibulina (Ukraine) Anastasiya Vasylyeva	3–6, 3–6
Winner	15.	12 May 2013	ITF Shymkent, Kazakhstan	Clay	(Uzbekistan) Albina Khabibulina	(Russia) Polina Monova (Russia) Anna Smolina	6–2, 6–2
Winner	16.	1 July 2013	ITF Middelburg, Netherlands	Clay	(Ukraine) Veronika Kapshay	(Oman) Fatma Al-Nabhani (Belarus) Sviatlana Pirazhenka	6–3, 6–3
Winner	17.	16 September 2013	ITF Antalya, Turkey	Hard	(Israel) Deniz Khazaniuk	(Philippines) Katharina Lehnert (Slovakia) Chantal Škamlová	6–7^{(5)}, 7–6^{(3)}, [10–8]
Runner–up	15.	17 November 2013	ITF Astana, Kazakhstan	Hard (i)	(Uzbekistan) Albina Khabibulina	(Russia) Polina Monova (Russia) Alena Tarasova	6–4, 1–6, [6–10]
Winner	18.	24 February 2014	ITF Astana, Kazakhstan	Hard (i)	(Uzbekistan) Albina Khabibulina	(Kazakhstan) Kamila Kerimbayeva (Ukraine) Veronika Kapshay	6–4, 7–5
Winner	19.	8 August 2014	ITF Astana, Kazakhstan	Hard	(Russia) Ekaterina Yashina	(Hong Kong) Eudice Chong (Russia) Anna Grigoryan	7–5, 6–3
Runner–up	16.	17 November 2014	ITF Shymkent, Kazakhstan	Clay	(Kazakhstan) Alexandra Grinchishina	(Belarus) Polina Pekhova (Uzbekistan) Albina Khabibulina	w/o
Runner–up	17.	1 February 2015	ITF Aktobe, Kazakhstan	Hard (i)	(Netherlands) Eva Wacanno	(Uzbekistan) Polina Merenkova (Uzbekistan) Albina Khabibulina	2–6, 6–7^{(6)}
Runner-up	18.	27 July 2015	ITF Astana, Kazakhstan	Hard	(Turkey) Başak Eraydın	(Russia) Natela Dzalamidze (Russia) Alena Tarasova	0–6, 1–6
Runner-up	19.	5 December 2016	ITF Val Gardena, Italy	Hard (i)	(Italy) Anna Remondina	(Romania) Laura-Ioana Andrei (Germany) Sarah-Rebecca Sekulic	2–6, 3–6
Winner	20.	25 March 2017	ITF Antalya, Turkey	Clay	(Georgia (country)) Sofia Shapatava	(Slovakia) Sandra Jamrichová (Bosnia and Herzegovina) Jelena Simić	6–4, 7–5
Winner	21.	28 July 2017	ITF Hua Hin, Thailand	Hard	(Thailand) Luksika Kumkhum	(Australia) Naiktha Bains (Switzerland) Karin Kennel	6–3, 2–6, [14–12]
Winner	22.	23 September 2017	ITF Shymkent, Kazakhstan	Hard	(Croatia) Mariana Dražić	(Kazakhstan) Dariya Detkovskaya (Kazakhstan) Zhibek Kulambayeva	7–5, 3–6, [10–8]
Winner	23.	30 September 2017	ITF Shymkent, Kazakhstan	Hard	(Croatia) Mariana Dražić	(Kazakhstan) Dariya Detkovskaya (Kazakhstan) Zhibek Kulambayeva	7–5, 6–2
Runner–up	20.	1 December 2017	ITF Indore, India	Hard	(Uzbekistan) Albina Khabibulina	(Bosnia and Herzegovina) Dea Herdželaš (Chinese Taipei) Hsu Ching-wen	2–6, 1–6
Runner–up	21.	14 January 2018	ITF Antalya, Turkey	Clay	(Turkey) İpek Öz	(Georgia (country)) Sofia Shapatava (Ukraine) Anastasiya Vasylyeva	7–5, 0–6, [11–13]
Winner	24.	16 February 2018	ITF Bergamo, Italy	Clay (i)	(Russia) Kseniia Bekker	(Italy) Martina Colmegna (Italy) Claudia Giovine	6–4, 4–6, [10–8]
Runner–up	22.	17 March 2018	ITF Antalya, Turkey	Clay	(Russia) Amina Anshba	(Switzerland) Xenia Knoll (Sweden) Cornelia Lister	0–6, 7–5, [8–10]
Winner	25.	13 July 2018	ITF Almaty, Kazakhstan	Hard	(Russia) Daria Kruzhkova	(Croatia) Mariana Dražić (Russia) Valeriya Zeleva	7–6^{(3)}, 6–4
Runner–up	23.	12 August 2018	Ladies Open Hechingen, Germany	Clay	(Georgia (country)) Sofia Shapatava	(Russia) Polina Monova (Slovakia) Chantal Škamlová	4–6, 3–6
Runner–up	24.	14 September 2018	ITF Almaty, Kazakhstan	Clay	(Uzbekistan) Albina Khabibulina	(Ukraine) Maryna Chernyshova (Israel) Vlada Ekshibarova	6–7^{(3)}, 2–6
Winner	26.	23 March 2019	ITF Antalya, Turkey	Clay	(Russia) Daria Mishina	(Romania) Cristina Dinu (North Macedonia) Lina Gjorcheska	6–3, 3–6, [12–10]
Runner–up	25.	27 April 2019	ITF Antalya, Turkey	Clay	(China) Zhang Ying	(Switzerland) Jenny Dürst (Switzerland) Chiara Grimm	w/o
Winner	27.	31 August 2019	ITF Almaty, Kazakhstan	Hard	(Georgia (country)) Sofia Shapatava	(Serbia) Tamara Čurović (Russia) Alina Silich	6–4, 7–6^{(3)}
