= Eugeniya Pashkova =

Russian tennis player

Eugeniya Pashkova Евгения Пашкова
- Country (sports): Russia
- Born: 19 February 1989 (age 37)
- Plays: Right (two-handed backhand)
- Prize money: $85,189

Singles
- Career record: 220–190
- Career titles: 1 ITF
- Highest ranking: No. 373 (7 July 2014)

Doubles
- Career record: 261–138
- Career titles: 34 ITF
- Highest ranking: No. 201 (3 August 2009)

Eugeniya Pashkova (Russian: Евгения Пашкова; born 19 February 1989) is a former Russian tennis player. On 7 July 2014, she reached her highest singles ranking of 373 by the WTA, whilst her best doubles ranking was 201 on 3 August 2009.

== ITF Circuit finals ==
$25,000 tournaments
$15,000 tournaments
$10,000 tournaments

=== Singles: 7 (1 title, 6 runner-ups) ===
Result	No.	Date	Tournament	Surface	Opponent	Score
Loss	1.	19 April 2010	ITF Almaty, Kazakhstan	Hard (i)	(Kyrgyzstan) Ksenia Palkina	5–7, 6–4, 4–6
Loss	2.	5 November 2010	ITF Minsk, Belarus	Carpet (i)	(Ukraine) Anastasiya Vasylyeva	4–6, 6–4, 3–6
Loss	3.	14 January 2012	ITF Antalya, Turkey	Clay	(Georgia (country)) Sofia Kvatsabaia	0–6, 2–6
Loss	4.	20 January 2013	ITF Sharm El Sheikh, Egypt	Hard	(Czech Republic) Denisa Allertova	2–6, 6–4, 6–7
Loss	5.	7 July 2013	ITF Brussels, Belgium	Clay	(Germany) Anna Klasen	3–6, 3–6
Win	6.	10 August 2013	ITF Astana, Kazakhstan	Hard	(Kazakhstan) Asiya Dair	6–1, 6–1
Loss	7.	24 March 2014	ITF Sharm El Sheikh, Egypt	Hard	(United Kingdom) Emily Webley-Smith	6–7, 6–0, 4–6

=== Doubles: 47 (34 titles, 13 runner-ups) ===
Result	No.	Date	Tournament	Surface	Partner	Opponents	Score
Loss	1.	9 July 2006	ITF Zhukovsky, Russia	Clay	(Russia) Elizaveta Titova	(Russia) Vasilisa Davydova (Russia) Elina Gasanova	3–6, 4–6
Loss	2.	5 April 2008	ITF Antalya, Turkey	Clay	(Russia) Avgusta Tsybysheva	(Romania) Simona Matei (Italy) Valentina Sulpizio	2–6, 7–5, [4–10]
Win	3.	23 August 2008	ITF Moscow, Russia	Clay	(Russia) Vitalia Diatchenko	(Slovenia) Tadeja Majerič (Russia) Natalia Ryzhonkova	6–0, 6–1
Loss	4.	15 September 2008	ITF Ruse, Bulgaria	Clay	(Russia) Vitalia Diatchenko	(Russia) Alexandra Panova (Russia) Ksenia Pervak	2–6, 7–6^{(5)}, [5–10]
Loss	5.	8 March 2009	ITF Minsk, Belarus	Carpet (i)	(Russia) Vitalia Diatchenko	(Belarus) Ima Bohush (Belarus) Darya Kustova	1–6, 6–4, [8–10]
Loss	6.	25 April 2009	ITF Almaty, Kazakhstan	Hard (i)	(Belarus) Ima Bohush	(Ukraine) Tetyana Arefyeva (Ukraine) Anastasiya Lytovchenko	4–6, 4–6
Win	7.	24 June 2009	ITF Rotterdam, Netherlands	Clay	(Latvia) Irina Kuzmina	(Australia) Alenka Hubacek (New Zealand) Kairangi Vano	7–6, 7–6
Loss	8.	18 July 2009	ITF Bucha, Ukraine	Clay	(Ukraine) Anastasiya Vasylyeva	(Ukraine) Irina Buryachok (Ukraine) Oksana Uzhylovska	4–6, 4–6
Loss	9.	20 March 2010	ITF St. Petersburg, Russia	Hard	(Russia) Alexandra Panova	(Ukraine) Alyona Sotnikova (Ukraine) Maryna Zanevska	5–7, 3–6
Win	10.	15 April 2010	ITF Astana, Kazakhstan	Hard (i)	(Russia) Maria Zharkova	(Russia) Alexandra Artamonova (Ukraine) Khristina Kazimova	6–0, 6–1
Win	11.	22 April 2010	ITF Almaty, Kazakhstan	Hard (i)	(Russia) Maria Zharkova	(Kyrgyzstan) Ksenia Palkina (Turkmenistan) Anastasiya Prenko	3–6, 7–6^{(9)}, [10–7]
Win	12.	21 August 2010	ITF St. Petersburg, Russia	Clay	(Russia) Maria Zharkova	(Ukraine) Valentyna Ivakhnenko (Ukraine) Mariya Malkhasyan	6–4, 5–7, [11–9]
Win	13.	4 November 2010	ITF Minsk, Belarus	Carpet (i)	(Russia) Maria Zharkova	(Ukraine) Oksana Pavlova (Russia) Ekaterina Yashina	5–7, 7–5, [12–10]
Loss	14.	12 March 2011	ITF Antalya, Turkey	Clay	(Russia) Maria Zharkova	(Netherlands) Danielle Harmsen (Netherlands) Bibiane Schoofs	3–6, 5–7
Win	15.	25 April 2011	ITF Karshi, Uzbekistan	Hard	(Ukraine) Tetyana Arefyeva	(Australia) Isabella Holland (United Kingdom) Naomi Broady	6–7^{(1)}, 7–5, [10–7]
Win	16.	24 June 2011	ITF İzmir, Turkey	Clay	(Russia) Tatiana Kotelnikova	(Bulgaria) Aleksandrina Naydenova (Slovakia) Anna Schmiedlova	6–4, 6–0
Win	17.	30 June 2011	ITF İzmir, Turkey	Clay	(Russia) Tatiana Kotelnikova	(Armenia) Ani Amiraghyan (Russia) Alexandra Romanova	7–6, 6–4
Win	18.	16 July 2011	ITF İzmir, Turkey	Clay	(Russia) Elena Kulikova	(Russia) Ksenia Kirillova (Ukraine) Ganna Piven	6–4, 6–3
Winner	19.	14 November 2011	ITF Vinaròs, Spain	Clay	(Italy) Anastasia Grymalska	(United Kingdom) Amanda Carreras (Spain) Carolina Prats Millán	6–3, 6–1
Win	20.	14 January 2012	ITF Antalya, Turkey	Clay	(Russia) Anastasia Frolova	(Romania) Patricia Chirea (Romania) Patricia Maria Tig	6–4, 7–6
Win	21.	16 March 2012	ITF Astana, Kazakhstan	Hard (i)	(Ukraine) Anastasiya Vasylyeva	(Uzbekistan) Albina Khabibulina (Belarus) Ilona Kremen	7–5, 6–2
Win	22.	23 March 2012	ITF Almaty, Kazakhstan	Hard	(Georgia (country)) Oksana Kalashnikova	(Uzbekistan) Albina Khabibulina (Belarus) Ilona Kremen	6–1, 7–5
Win	23.	21 April 2012	ITF Les Franqueses del Valles, Spain	Hard	(Germany) Carolin Daniels	(India) Sharmada Balu (China) Sirui He	6–4, 6–3
Win	24.	29 April 2012	ITF Vic, Spain	Clay	(Bulgaria) Isabella Shinikova	(United Kingdom) Amanda Carreras (Mexico) Ximena Hermoso	6–1, 6–2
Loss	25.	3 August 2012	ITF Moscow, Russia	Clay	(Ukraine) Anastasiya Vasylyeva	(Australia) Arina Rodionova (Russia) Valeria Solovyeva	3–6, 3–6
Win	26.	22 September 2012	Batumi Ladies Open, Georgia	Hard	(Russia) Yuliya Kalabina	(Ukraine) Alona Fomina (Ukraine) Anna Shkudun	7–6, 6–1
Win	27.	1 December 2012	ITF Antalya, Turkey	Clay	(Ukraine) Anastasiya Vasylyeva	(Romania) Laura Ioana Andrei (Austria) Janina Toljan	4–6, 6–3, [10–2]
Win	28.	20 January 2013	ITF Sharm El Sheikh, Egypt	Hard	(Russia) Ekaterina Yashina	(Netherlands) Valeria Podda (Egypt) Mayar Sherif	3–6, 6–2, [10–3]
Win	29.	21 January 2013	ITF Sharm El Sheikh, Egypt	Hard	(Belarus) Lidziya Marozava	(Austria) Melanie Klaffner (Turkey) Melis Sezer	6–3, 6–1
Win	30.	16 March 2013	ITF Madrid, Spain	Clay	(Russia) Yana Sizikova	(Italy) Gaia Sanesi (Italy) Giulia Sussarello	3–6, 6–3, [10–5]
Win	31.	8 April 2013	ITF La Marsa, Tunisia	Clay	(Hungary) Réka Luca Jani	(Montenegro) Danka Kovinić (Brazil) Laura Pigossi	6–3, 4–6, [10–5]
Loss	32.	22 April 2013	ITF Tunis, Tunisia	Clay	(Hungary) Réka Luca Jani	(Serbia) Aleksandra Krunić (Poland) Katarzyna Piter	2–6, 6–3, [7–10]
Loss	33.	1 June 2013	ITF Moscow, Russia	Clay	(Ukraine) Anastasiya Vasylyeva	(Russia) Ksenia Kirillova (Russia) Polina Monova	6–1, 4–6 [4–10]
Win	34.	15 June 2013	Bredeney Ladies Open, Germany	Clay	(Ukraine) Anastasiya Vasylyeva	(France) Irina Ramialison (France) Constance Sibille	7–5, 6–4
Win	35.	22 June 2013	ITF Cologne, Germany	Clay	(Ukraine) Anastasiya Vasylyeva	(Serbia) Tamara Čurović (Germany) Antonia Lottner	6–3, 5–7, [10–6]
Win	36.	3 August 2013	ITF Astana, Kazakhstan	Hard	(Russia) Vera Bessonova	(Russia) Maya Gaverova (Kazakhstan) Yelena Nemchen	3–6, 6–1, [12–10]
Win	37.	10 August 2013	ITF Astana, Kazakhstan	Hard	(Russia) Vera Bessonova	(Japan) Yoshimi Kawasaki (Japan) Yumi Nakano	6–4, 3–6, [10–7]
Loss	38.	8 November 2013	ITF Astana, Kazakhstan	Hard (i)	(Russia) Alexandra Artamonova	(Ukraine) Lyudmyla Kichenok (Ukraine) Nadiya Kichenok	1–6, 1–6
Win	39.	10 February 2014	ITF Sharm El Sheikh, Egypt	Hard	(Montenegro) Ana Veselinović	(Italy) Giulia Bruzzone (Romania) Elena-Teodora Cadar	2–6, 6–0, [10–4]
Win	40.	17 February 2014	ITF Sharm El Sheikh, Egypt	Hard	(Montenegro) Ana Veselinović	(Madagascar) Zarah Razafimahatratra (Netherlands) Demi Schuurs	6–2, 6–1
Win	41.	17 March 2014	ITF Sharm El Sheikh, Egypt	Hard	(Montenegro) Ana Veselinović	(Finland) Emma Laine (United Kingdom) Emily Webley-Smith	6–3, 7–5
Win	42.	24 March 2014	ITF Sharm El Sheikh, Egypt	Hard	(India) Prarthana Thombare	(United Kingdom) Laura Deigman (United Kingdom) Emily Webley-Smith	6–2, 6–4
Win	43.	23 April 2014	ITF Namangan, Uzbekistan	Hard	(Ukraine) Ganna Poznikhirenko	(Venezuela) Andrea Gámiz (Russia) Yana Buchina	6–4, 6–1
Win	44.	19 May 2014	ITF Bol, Croatia	Clay	(Finland) Emma Laine	(Ukraine) Olga Ianchuk (Germany) Christina Shakovets	6–4, 6–0
Loss	45.	8 June 2014	ITF Budapest, Hungary	Clay	(Slovakia) Zuzana Luknárová	(Argentina) Sofía Blanco (Croatia) Adrijana Lekaj	6–7^{(5)}, 3–6
Win	46.	10 November 2014	ITF Helsinki, Finland	Hard (i)	(Finland) Emma Laine	(Finland) Mia Eklund (Finland) Olivia Pimiä	6–4, 6–0
Win	47.	14 June 2015	ITF Bol, Croatia	Clay	(Hungary) Ágnes Bukta	(Netherlands) Liv Geurts (Netherlands) Janneke Wikkerink	w/o
