= Maja Kambič =

Slovenian tennis player

- Country (sports): Slovenia
- Born: 7 February 1988 (age 37)
- Turned pro: 2005
- Retired: 2009
- Plays: Right (two-handed backhand)
- Prize money: $7,846

Singles
- Career record: 12–28
- Highest ranking: No. 939 (3 December 2007)

Doubles
- Career record: 23–32
- Career titles: 2 ITF
- Highest ranking: No. 550 (10 September 2007)
- Last updated on: 9 November 2016.

Maja Kambič (born 7 February 1988) is a former Slovenian female tennis player.

Kambič won two doubles titles on the ITF Women's Circuit in her career. On 3 December 2007, she reached her best singles ranking of world No. 939. On 10 September 2007, she peaked at No. 550 in the WTA doubles rankings.

She made her WTA Tour main draw debut at the 2008 Slovenia Open, in the doubles event partnering Astrid Besser.

Kambič retired from tennis 2009.

== ITF finals ==
=== Doubles (2–2) ===
Legend $25,000 tournaments $10,000 tournaments	Finals by surface Hard (2–1) Clay (0–1)

Outcome	No.	Date	Location	Surface	Partner	Opponents	Score
Winner	1.	22 September 2006	Mytilini, Greece	Hard	(Russia) Alexandra Panova	(Greece) Anna Koumantou (Turkey) İpek Şenoğlu	6–2, 6–1
Runner-up	1.	27 May 2007	Istanbul, Turkey	Hard	(Russia) Avgusta Tsybysheva	(Turkey) Çağla Büyükakçay (Germany) Ria Dörnemann	2–6, 4–6
Winner	2.	22 July 2007	Gausdal, Norway	Hard	(Slovenia) Petra Pajalič	(Ukraine) Tetyana Arefyeva (Ukraine) Elena Jirnova	7–6^{(7–3)}, 5–7, 6–3
Runner-up	2.	19 May 2008	Gorizia, Italy	Clay	(Slovenia) Anja Prislan	(Croatia) Darija Jurak (Switzerland) Lisa Sabino	0–6, 1–6
