= 2016 İstanbul Cup – Singles =

Singles
- 2016 İstanbul Cup

Final
- Champion: (Turkey) Çağla Büyükakçay
- Runner-up: (Montenegro) Danka Kovinić
- Score: 3–6, 6–2, 6–3

Details
- Draw: 32
- Seeds: 8

Events
Singles	Doubles
- İstanbul Cup

Çağla Büyükakçay won her first WTA title, defeating Danka Kovinić in the final, 3–6, 6–2, 6–3. She became the first Turkish woman to lift a WTA Tour title.

Lesia Tsurenko was the defending champion, but lost in the first round to Sorana Cîrstea.

== Seeds ==
1. (Slovakia) Anna Karolína Schmiedlová (first round)
2. (Belgium) Yanina Wickmayer (first round)
3. (Ukraine) Lesia Tsurenko (first round)
4. (Belgium) Kirsten Flipkens (second round)
5. (Montenegro) Danka Kovinić (final)
6. (Japan) Nao Hibino (quarterfinals)
7. (Ukraine) Kateryna Bondarenko (second round)
8. (Sweden) Johanna Larsson (second round)

== Draw ==
Key

- Q = Qualifier
- WC = Wild card
- LL = Lucky loser
- Alt = Alternate
- ITF = ITF entry
- PR = Protected ranking
- SR = Special ranking
- SE = Special exempt
- JE = Junior exempt
- JR = Junior Accelerator Programme entrant
- CO = College Accelerator Programme entrant
- NG = Next Gen Accelerator Program entrant
- w/o = Walkover
- r = Retired
- d = Defaulted

=== Finals ===
Semifinals
5	(Montenegro) Danka Kovinić	7	6
(Ukraine) Kateryna Kozlova	5	4
(Turkey) Çağla Büyükakçay	6	7
(Switzerland) Stefanie Vögele	0	5

Final
5	(Montenegro) Danka Kovinić	6	2	3
(Turkey) Çağla Büyükakçay	3	6	6

=== Top half ===
First round
1	(Slovakia) AK Schmiedlová	2	3
Q	(Greece) M Sakkari	6	6
(Italy) K Knapp	7^{7}	5	1
(Chinese Taipei) S-w Hsieh	6^{3}	7	6
(Bulgaria) T Pironkova	6	6
(Belarus) A Sasnovich	2	2
(Japan) K Nara	3	3
5	(Montenegro) D Kovinić	6	6
4	(Belgium) K Flipkens	7^{7}	6
(Croatia) D Vekić	6^{5}	4
(Romania) A Dulgheru	7^{7}	6^{3}	1
(Ukraine) K Kozlova	6^{4}	7^{7}	6
(Serbia) A Krunić	0	0
(Latvia) A Sevastova	6	6
Q	(Ukraine) M Zanevska	2	6	6^{5}
8	(Sweden) J Larsson	6	2	7^{7}

Second round
Q	(Greece) M Sakkari	6	6
(Chinese Taipei) S-w Hsieh	3	4
(Bulgaria) T Pironkova	5	6^{4}
5	(Montenegro) D Kovinić	7	7^{7}
4	(Belgium) K Flipkens	3	4
(Ukraine) K Kozlova	6	6
(Latvia) A Sevastova	6	6
8	(Sweden) J Larsson	4	3

Quarterfinals
Q	(Greece) M Sakkari	6	1	2
5	(Montenegro) D Kovinić	1	6	6
(Ukraine) K Kozlova	6	6
(Latvia) A Sevastova	2	3

Semifinals
5	(Montenegro) D Kovinić	7	6
(Ukraine) K Kozlova	5	4

=== Bottom half ===
First round
6	(Japan) N Hibino	2	6	6
WC	(Ukraine) D Yastremska	6	4	3
WC	(Turkey) A Aksu	3	4
Q	(Hungary) R-L Jani	6	6
(Turkey) Ç Büyükakçay	6	6
Q	(Russia) M Melnikova	3	3
Q	(Romania) S Cîrstea	6	6
3	(Ukraine) L Tsurenko	3	4
7	(Ukraine) K Bondarenko	5	6	6
(Belarus) O Govortsova	7	3	4
(Israel) J Glushko	3	2
Q	(Slovakia) K Kučová	6	6
(Switzerland) S Vögele	6	7
WC	(Turkey) İ Soylu	2	5
(Romania) A Mitu	7	6
2	(Belgium) Y Wickmayer	5	4

Second round
6	(Japan) N Hibino	2	6	6
Q	(Hungary) R-L Jani	6	2	3
(Turkey) Ç Büyükakçay	6	6
Q	(Romania) S Cîrstea	4	2
7	(Ukraine) K Bondarenko	3	6	5
Q	(Slovakia) K Kučová	6	1	7
(Switzerland) S Vögele	6	6
(Romania) A Mitu	4	1

Quarterfinals
6	(Japan) N Hibino	1	2
(Turkey) Ç Büyükakçay	6	6
Q	(Slovakia) K Kučová	5	2
(Switzerland) S Vögele	7	6

Semifinals
(Turkey) Ç Büyükakçay	6	7
(Switzerland) S Vögele	0	5

== Qualifying ==
=== Seeds ===
1. (Greece) Maria Sakkari (qualified)
2. (Ukraine) Kateryna Kozlova (moved to main draw)
3. (Switzerland) Romina Oprandi (first round)
4. (Slovakia) Kristína Kučová (qualified)
5. (Romania) Sorana Cîrstea (qualified)
6. (Ukraine) Maryna Zanevska (qualified)
7. (Czech Republic) Tereza Martincová (qualifying competition, retired)
8. (New Zealand) Marina Erakovic (qualifying competition)
9. (Russia) Polina Leykina (first round)
10. (China) Lu Jiajing (qualifying competition)
11. (France) Myrtille Georges (qualifying competition)
12. (Spain) Laura Pous Tió (first round)
13. (Russia) Marina Melnikova (qualified)

=== Qualifiers ===
1. (Greece) Maria Sakkari
2. (Russia) Marina Melnikova
3. (Hungary) Réka-Luca Jani
4. (Slovakia) Kristína Kučová
5. (Romania) Sorana Cîrstea
6. (Ukraine) Maryna Zanevska

=== Draw ===
==== First qualifier ====
First round
1	(Greece) Maria Sakkari	7	6
(Romania) Cristina Dinu	5	1
WC	(Australia) Sara Tomic	3	4
11	(France) Myrtille Georges	6	6

Qualifying competition
1	(Greece) Maria Sakkari	6	6
11	(France) Myrtille Georges	0	2

==== Second qualifier ====
First round
13	(Russia) Marina Melnikova	7^{10}	4	6
WC	(Turkey) Melis Sezer	6^{8}	6	1
(Uzbekistan) Nigina Abduraimova	6	0	6
9	(Russia) Polina Leykina	2	6	3

Qualifying competition
13	(Russia) Marina Melnikova	6	6
(Uzbekistan) Nigina Abduraimova	4	1

==== Third qualifier ====
First round
3	(Switzerland) Romina Oprandi	3	1
(Hungary) Réka-Luca Jani	6	6
Alt	(Bulgaria) Petia Arshinkova	2	1
10	(China) Lu Jiajing	6	6

Qualifying competition
(Hungary) Réka-Luca Jani	7	6
10	(China) Lu Jiajing	5	3

==== Fourth qualifier ====
First round
4	(Slovakia) Kristína Kučová	6	6
(Ukraine) Valeriya Strakhova	1	1
(Russia) Anastasiya Komardina	3	1
8	(New Zealand) Marina Erakovic	6	6

Qualifying competition
4	(Slovakia) Kristína Kučová	6	6
8	(New Zealand) Marina Erakovic	4	3

==== Fifth qualifier ====
First round
5	(Romania) Sorana Cîrstea	6	6
WC	(Turkey) Pemra Özgen	1	0
WC	(Turkey) Başak Eraydın	6	7^{12}
12	(Spain) Laura Pous Tió	2	6^{10}

Qualifying competition
5	(Romania) Sorana Cîrstea	7	6
WC	(Turkey) Başak Eraydın	5	3

==== Sixth qualifier ====
First round
6	(Ukraine) Maryna Zanevska	7^{7}	7^{7}
(Poland) Katarzyna Piter	6^{5}	6^{4}
(Georgia (country)) Sofia Shapatava	2	6	3
7	(Czech Republic) Tereza Martincová	6	1	6

Qualifying competition
6	(Ukraine) Maryna Zanevska	6	3
7	(Czech Republic) Tereza Martincová	1	1^{r}
