= 2016 İstanbul Cup – Doubles =

Women's tennis tournament

Doubles
- 2016 İstanbul Cup

Final
- Champions: (Romania) Andreea Mitu (Turkey) İpek Soylu
- Runners-up: (Switzerland) Xenia Knoll (Montenegro) Danka Kovinić
- Score: walkover

Details
- Draw: 16
- Seeds: 4

Events
| Singles | Doubles |
- İstanbul Cup

Daria Gavrilova and Elina Svitolina were the defending champions, but chose not to participate this year.

Andreea Mitu and İpek Soylu won the title by walkover when Xenia Knoll and Danka Kovinić withdrew from the final. Mitu and Soylu won the title by playing only two matches, since their semifinal opponents also withdrew.

== Seeds ==
1. (Ukraine) Kateryna Bondarenko / (Ukraine) Olga Savchuk (first round)
2. (Georgia (country)) Oksana Kalashnikova / (Sweden) Johanna Larsson (quarterfinals)
3. (Switzerland) Xenia Knoll / (Montenegro) Danka Kovinić (final, withdrew)
4. (Russia) Valentyna Ivakhnenko / (Belarus) Lidziya Marozava (first round)

== Draw ==
Key

- Q = Qualifier
- WC = Wild card
- LL = Lucky loser
- Alt = Alternate
- ITF = ITF entry
- PR = Protected ranking
- SR = Special ranking
- SE = Special exempt
- JE = Junior exempt
- JR = Junior Accelerator Programme entrant
- CO = College Accelerator Programme entrant
- NG = Next Gen Accelerator Program entrant
- w/o = Walkover
- r = Retired
- d = Defaulted

First round
1 | (Ukraine) K Bondarenko (Ukraine) O Savchuk | 3 | 2
(Japan) N Hibino (Japan) K Nara | 6 | 6
(Hungary) R-L Jani (Ukraine) M Zanevska | 6 | 7^{7}
WC | (Turkey) Ç Büyükakçay (Slovakia) AK Schmiedlová | 1 | 6^{5}
4 | (Russia) V Ivakhnenko (Belarus) L Marozava | 1 | 6^{6}
(Russia) N Dzalamidze (Russia) V Kudermetova | 6 | 7^{8}
(Romania) A Mitu (Turkey) İ Soylu | 6 | 3 | [11]
(Czech Republic) L Kunčíková (Czech Republic) K Stuchlá | 3 | 6 | [9]
(Russia) M Melnikova (Georgia (country)) S Shapatava | 6 | 6
(Romania) E Bogdan (Romania) C Dinu | 0 | 1
(Turkey) B Eraydın (Russia) P Monova | 2 | 4
3 | (Switzerland) X Knoll (Montenegro) D Kovinić | 6 | 6
(Georgia (country)) E Gorgodze (Ukraine) A Vasylyeva | 1 | 0
(Spain) L Pous Tió (Czech Republic) R Voráčová | 6 | 6
WC | (Turkey) A Aksu (Turkey) M Sezer | 2 | 4
2 | (Georgia (country)) O Kalashnikova (Sweden) J Larsson | 6 | 6

Quarterfinals
(Japan) N Hibino (Japan) K Nara | 6 | 0
(Hungary) R-L Jani (Ukraine) M Zanevska | 3 | 0^{r}
(Russia) N Dzalamidze (Russia) V Kudermetova | 2 | 2
(Romania) A Mitu (Turkey) İ Soylu | 6 | 6
(Russia) M Melnikova (Georgia (country)) S Shapatava | 5 | 1
3 | (Switzerland) X Knoll (Montenegro) D Kovinić | 7 | 6
(Spain) L Pous Tió (Czech Republic) R Voráčová | 6 | 6
2 | (Georgia (country)) O Kalashnikova (Sweden) J Larsson | 3 | 2

Semifinals
(Japan) N Hibino (Japan) K Nara
(Romania) A Mitu (Turkey) İ Soylu | w/o
3 | (Switzerland) X Knoll (Montenegro) D Kovinić | 6 | 6
(Spain) L Pous Tió (Czech Republic) R Voráčová | 4 | 2

Final
(Romania) A Mitu (Turkey) İ Soylu | w/o
3 | (Switzerland) X Knoll (Montenegro) D Kovinić
