= Çağla Büyükakçay =

Turkish tennis player (born 1989)

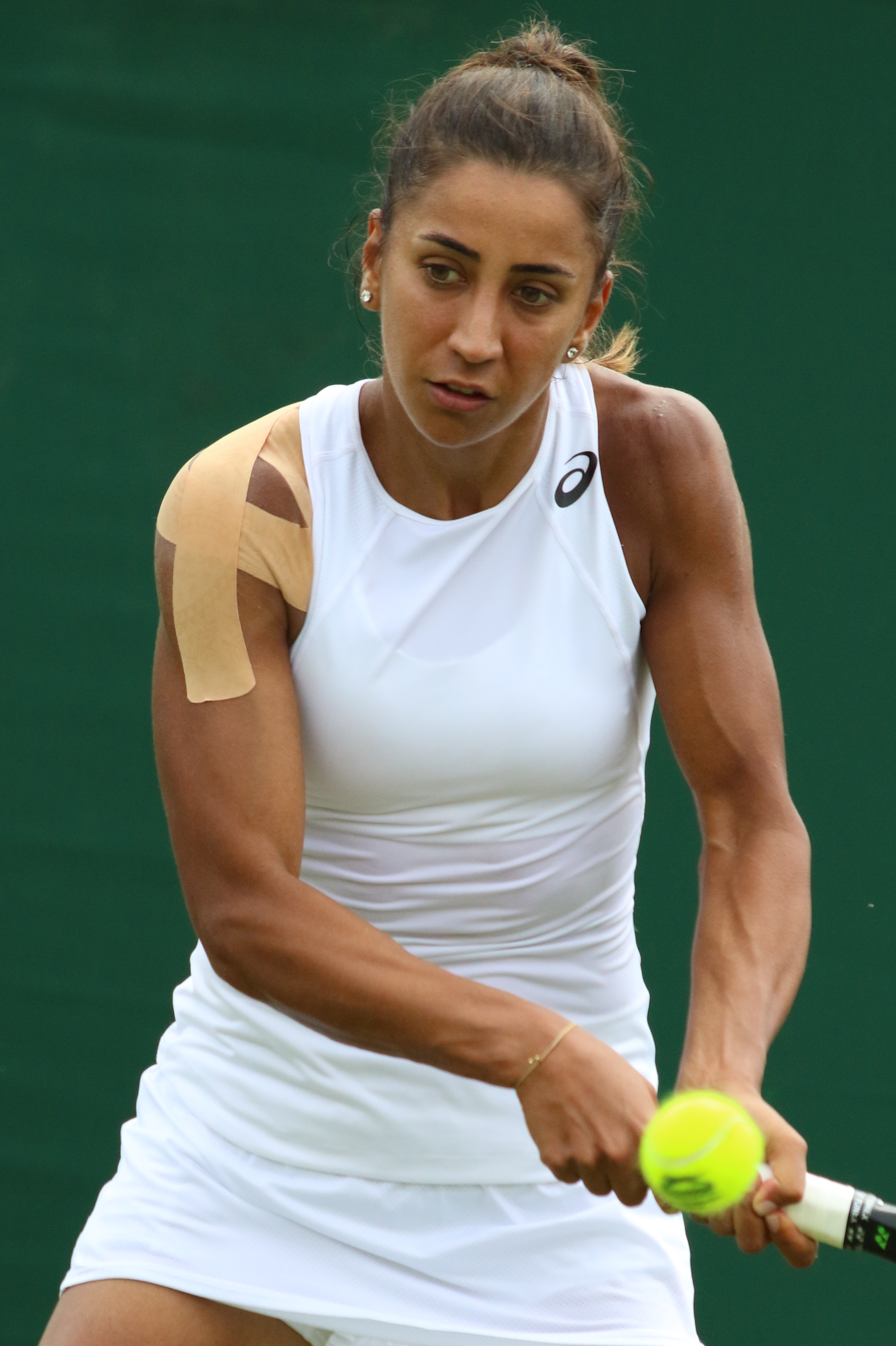
- Büyükakçay at the 2019 Wimbledon
- Country (sports): Turkey
- Residence: Istanbul, Turkey
- Born: 28 September 1989 (age 37) Adana, Turkey
- Height: 1.72 m (5 ft 8 in)
- Turned pro: 2006
- Plays: Right-handed (two-handed backhand)
- Coach: Can Uner
- Prize money: US$ 1,321,919

Singles
- Career record: 574–482
- Career titles: 1 WTA, 12 ITF
- Highest ranking: No. 60 (12 September 2016)
- Current ranking: No. 385 (4 May 2026)

Grand Slam singles results
- Australian Open: 1R (2017)
- French Open: 2R (2016, 2017)
- Wimbledon: 1R (2016)
- US Open: 2R (2016)

Other tournaments
- Olympic Games: 1R (2016)

Doubles
- Career record: 169–162
- Career titles: 15 ITF
- Highest ranking: No. 111 (29 February 2016)

Grand Slam doubles results
- Wimbledon: 1R (2016)
- US Open: 1R (2016)

Team competitions
- Fed Cup: 42–33
- Last updated on: 14 May 2026.

Çağla Büyükakçay
Medal record

Women's tennis

Representing Turkey

Mediterranean Games
Gold medal – first place	2013 Mersin	Singles
Gold medal – first place	2013 Mersin	Doubles
Silver medal – second place	2009 Pescara	Doubles
Bronze medal – third place	2026 Taranto	Doubles

Çağla Büyükakçay (Turkish pronunciation: [tʃaːˈla byˈjykaktʃaj]; born 28 September 1989) is a Turkish professional tennis player. She won her first title at her home tournament in Istanbul, becoming the first Turkish woman to lift a WTA Tour title.

She has won 12 singles and 15 doubles titles on the ITF Women's Circuit. In September 2016, she reached her highest singles ranking of world No. 60. On 29 February 2016, she peaked at No. 111 in the WTA doubles rankings.

Playing for Turkey in the Billie Jean King Cup, Büyükakçay has a win–loss record of 42–33 (as of July 2024). Büyükakçay was the first tennis player to represent Turkey at the Olympic Games. She competed at the Rio Olympics.

She was the top-ranked tennis player at Istanbul's multi-sports club Enkaspor.

== Career ==
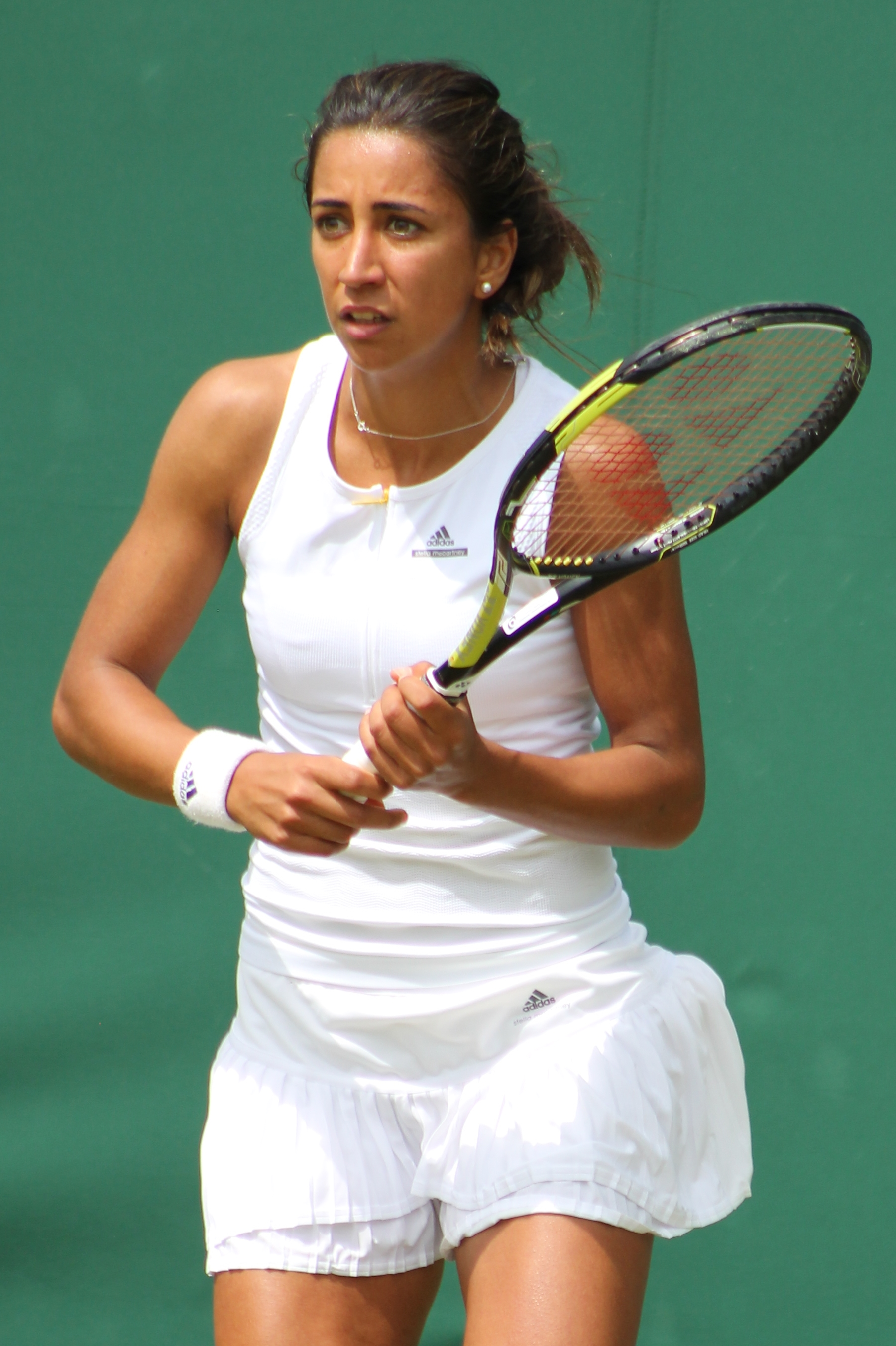
Büyükakçay at the 2015 Wimbledon Championships

She did not contest many junior tournaments, only playing four, before competing at the senior level. After a few aborted starts, Büyükakçay played her first professional match at an ITF event in Istanbul in May 2004. Losing in the qualifying draw, she would play two more tournaments during the 2004 season. She won her first ever Fed Cup match in 2005, partnering Pemra Özgen to defeat Stephanie Pace and Stephanie Sullivan of Malta. She made her WTA debut at the İstanbul Cup, but lost to Elena Vesnina in the first round. She continued to compete in $10k and $25k events for the remainder of the year.

Büyükakçay began the 2006 season in Ramat HaSharon, but fell there in qualifying to Katariina Tuohimaa. She did not win a main-draw match until April, when she made it to the second round of a $10k tournament in Chennai. She again played for Turkey in Fed Cup, registering a straight-sets win over Olfa Dhaoui of Tunisia. She partnered again with Pemra Özgen, this time double bageling Sigurlaug Sigurdardottir and Iris Staub of Iceland. She reached her first singles and doubles finals simultaneously in Antalya, losing the singles final but winning the doubles with Alena Bayarchyk. She continued mainly on the ITF Circuit but would not reach another final until September, when she made it to the final in Istanbul. Büyükakçay continued to gain experience during the 2007 season, recording her first ever singles title in Istanbul.

In 2008, Büyükakçay won her second singles title in Gaziantep. She proceeded to enter a mix of lower and higher-level ITF tournaments with some success, including a quarterfinal appearance at a $50k tournament in Penza, going down to Julia Glushko in a tough three-set match. She ended the season on a high, capturing the doubles title with Lucía Sainz in Vinaròs. Büyükakçay recorded her first singles title of the 2009 season in Istanbul before returning to the city two weeks later. Having been awarded a wildcard into the 2009 İstanbul Cup, she drew Lucie Hradecká and led the Czech by a set before succumbing in three sets. She did not compete in any other WTA tournaments for the rest of the year.

Büyükakçay had an exceptional 2010 season – she remained undefeated during the Fed Cup, winning three singles matches and dropping only four games in the process. She followed up her Fed Cup success the following week, winning the biggest singles title of her career at a $25k tournament in Kharkiv. She won another $25k title in Valladolid in July before returning to Istanbul to play at the İstanbul Cup. Having bowed out in the first round to Elena Baltacha, she entered the doubles draw with Pemra Özgen and reached the semifinals. It was the first WTA-level semifinal in her career – in singles or doubles. She went on to make history when she entered the US Open qualifying draw. Although she lost in the qualifying first round, it was a major achievement in that no other Turkish woman had previously entered qualifying of a Grand Slam tournament. She continued on the tour and reached another final in Esperance, Western Australia, losing to Sacha Jones of New Zealand.

Her first 2011 tournament was the Australian Open, winning one qualifying match before going down to Corinna Dentoni. She began to combine her schedule with more WTA events but did not reach another final until July, when she lost to Garbiñe Muguruza in Caceras. At the US Open, she lost in the second round of qualifying to Mandy Minella of Luxembourg. In October, she lost in the final of a $25k event in Netanya, narrowly losing to Dinah Pfizenmaier in three sets. However, she did win the doubles crown with Pemra Özgen for her 15th doubles title.

In 2012, Büyükakçay managed to record appearances in the finals of three $25k tournaments in Moscow, Zwevegem, and Istanbul, but lost each one to Margarita Gasparyan, Anastasija Sevastova, and Richèl Hogenkamp. She experienced more success in Fed Cup play, winning three singles and one doubles match for Turkey. Büyükakçay was in touching distance of a main-draw berth at the 2013 Australian Open, but lost in the final round of qualifying to Lesia Tsurenko in straight sets. She reached the semifinals of a $25k event in Namangan but was defeated by Oksana Kalashnikova in close three-set encounter. At the French Open, she scraped past Nastassja Burnett in the first qualifying round, but was soundly beaten in the second by Arantxa Parra Santonja. She would rebound; however, when she reached the final of another $25k tournament in Moscow the following week, finishing runner-up to young Anett Kontaveit of Estonia. She maintained her solid performance for the rest of the season, picking up doubles titles in Shrewsbury, Loughborough, Istanbul, and Ankara.

Büyükakçay experienced a shaky start to the 2014 season – suffering three-set losses to Ashleigh Barty and Kateřina Siniaková in Australia. Although she advanced to the quarterfinals at a $25k event in Sunderland, she only managed to win one singles match at the Fed Cup in Hungary. She was then granted wildcards into the prestigious WTA tournaments in Doha and Dubai, but was beaten in the first round of both by Karolína Plíšková and Zhang Shuai, respectively. She began to pick up form in April, when she won her first singles title in nearly four years in Edgbaston, defeating Frenchwoman Pauline Parmentier. A week later, she advanced to her first ever WTA quarterfinal in Kuala Lumpur and at the French Open, she again came close to a spot in the main draw, but was defeated in the final round of qualifying by Aleksandra Wozniak. At Wimbledon, she was beaten in the first round of qualifying and only managed to win one match during the entire grass-court season.

=== 2015 ===
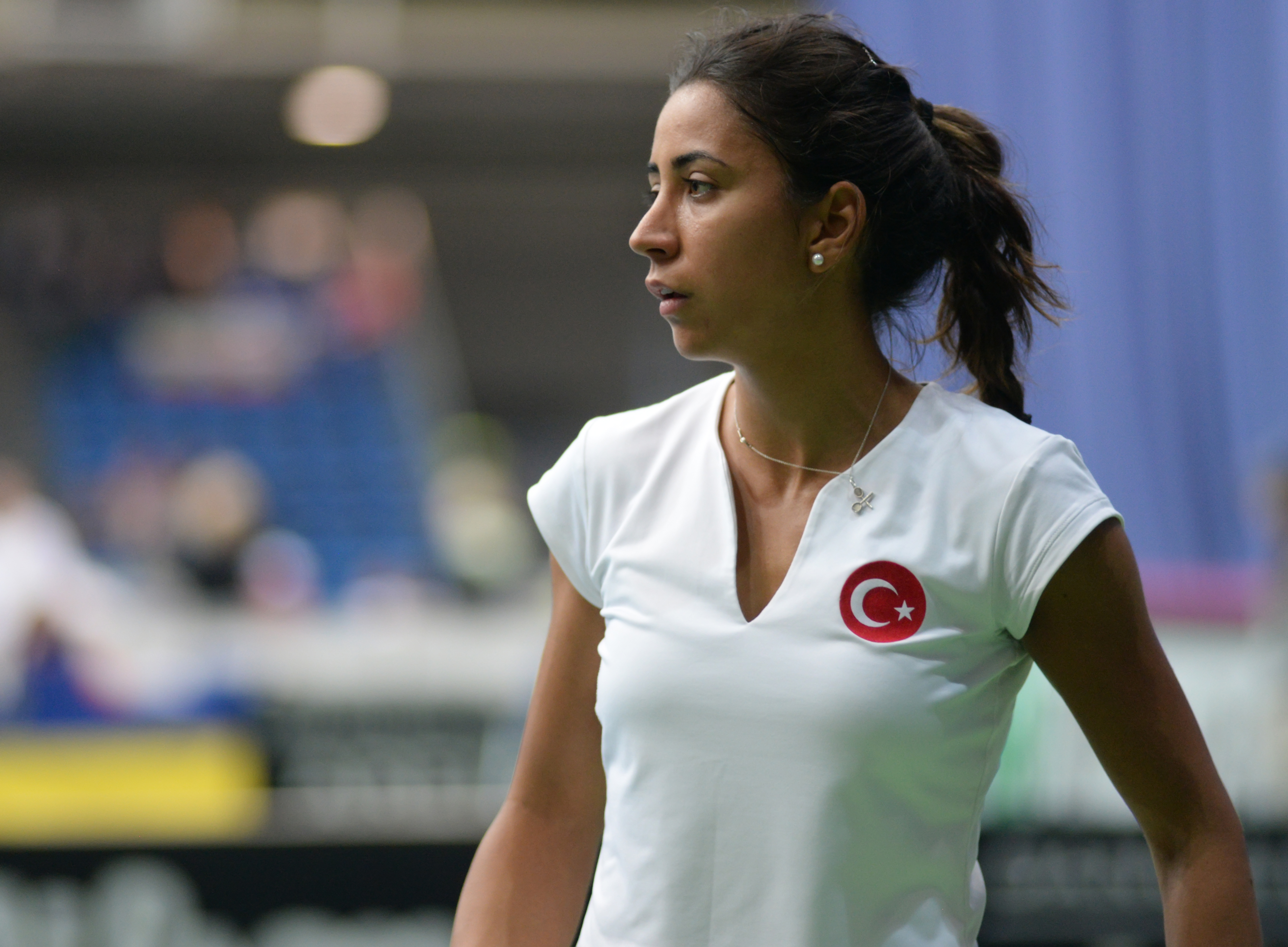
Büyükakçay at the 2015 Fed Cup

Büyükakçay played her first tournament of the year in Shenzhen, where she came through qualifying to make the main draw. She defeated Lara Arruabarrena in the first round. However, in the second round, she was defeated by former world No. 2, Vera Zvonareva, in straight sets. Büyükakçay made her way to Australia, where she competed to qualify for the main draw for the Australian Open. She defeated Nigina Abduraimova and Viktorija Golubic, but then lost to Tatjana Maria in the final round of qualifying, in straight sets.

In February, Büyükakçay represented Turkey at the 2015 Fed Cup in Group 1 Europe/Africa, in which she had great success. Her most notable wins came when she defeated both Heather Watson and Elina Svitolina, who both were ranked in the top 50. Büyükakçay won all of her singles matches during the 2015 Fed Cup. Her excellent performance was recognized when she was nominated and won the Fed Cup Heart Award, in which she was given the opportunity to donate $1,000 to her chosen charity. Büyükakçay donated the money to the Association of Supporting the Civil Life.

=== 2016: Historic WTA Tour title and top 100 debut ===
Her first tournaments were the Shenzhen Open, where she lost in the second round of qualifying to Yaroslava Shvedova, and the Australian Open, where she was defeated in the first round of qualifying by Maria Sakkari. After reaching the second round in the ITF event in Andrézieux-Bouthéon and losing in the first round of qualifying at the Dubai Tennis Championships, Büyükakçay received a wildcard for the Qatar Ladies Open. She defeated Lucie Hradecká before upsetting No. 7 seed and defending champion Lucie Šafářová in straight sets. In the third round, she lost to Roberta Vinci.

Her next tournament was the Malaysian Open, where she defeated Laura Siegemund and Chang Kai-chen before losing to eventual finalist Eugenie Bouchard. She then played at the Miami Open where she lost in the first round of qualifying to Naomi Broady. She also lost in the first round at an ITF event in Osprey. At the Charleston Open, she reached the first round as a qualifier (beating Julia Boserup and Ysaline Bonaventure) where she lost to Danka Kovinić. At the İstanbul Cup, she beat Marina Melnikova, Sorana Cîrstea, Nao Hibino and Stefanie Vögele en route. She then avenged her loss to Kovinic, beating the Montenegrin in three sets and becoming the first Turkish woman to lift a WTA title. She was also the first Turkish woman to break into the WTA singles top 100 by setting a new career-high of world No. 82 on 25 April 2016.

Prior to the French Open, Büyükakçay reached the second round of an ITF tournament in Trnava, losing to Kateřina Siniaková. At the second Grand Slam tournament of the year, she entered as qualifier (beating Elitsa Kostova, Petra Martić and Klára Koukalová en route) and became the first Turkish woman to win a major match by beating Aliaksandra Sasnovich in three sets, before losing to Anastasia Pavlyuchenkova. She started grass-court season at the Nottingham Open where she lost to Caroline Wozniacki in the first round. Her next three tournaments, including Wimbledon, also ended in early exits.

At the 2016 Rio Olympics, Büyükakçay faced Ekaterina Makarova in the first round and lost in three sets. She was the first Turkish woman to compete at the Olympics for tennis.

== Performance timelines ==
Key
W	F	SF	QF	#R	RR	Q#	P#	DNQ	A	Z#	PO	G	S	B	NMS	NTI	P	NH

(W) winner; (F) finalist; (SF) semifinalist; (QF) quarterfinalist; (#R) rounds 4, 3, 2, 1; (RR) round-robin stage; (Q#) qualification round; (P#) preliminary round; (DNQ) did not qualify; (A) absent; (Z#) Davis/Fed Cup Zonal Group (with number indication) or (PO) play-off; (G) gold, (S) silver or (B) bronze Olympic/Paralympic medal; (NMS) not a Masters tournament; (NTI) not a Tier I tournament; (P) postponed; (NH) not held; (SR) strike rate (events won / competed); (W–L) win–loss record.
To avoid confusion and double counting, these charts are updated at the conclusion of a tournament or when the player's participation has ended.

Only main-draw results in WTA Tour, Grand Slam tournaments, Fed Cup/Billie Jean King Cup and Olympic Games are included in win–loss records.

=== Singles ===
Current after the 2021 US Open.

Tournament	2005	...	2008	2009	2010	2011	2012	2013	2014	2015	2016	2017	2018	2019	2020	2021	SR	W–L	Win %
Grand Slam tournaments
Australian Open	A		A	A	A	Q2	Q1	Q3	Q1	Q3	Q1	1R	Q1	A	A	Q2	0 / 1	0–1	0%
French Open	A		A	A	A	Q1	A	Q2	Q3	Q1	2R	2R	Q1	A	Q2	Q2	0 / 2	2–2	50%
Wimbledon	A		A	A	A	Q1	Q1	Q2	Q1	Q1	1R	Q2	Q1	Q1	NH	Q1	0 / 1	0–1	0%
US Open	A		A	A	Q1	Q2	Q2	Q2	Q2	Q1	2R	Q2	Q1	A	A	Q1	0 / 1	1–1	50%
Win–loss	0–0		0–0	0–0	0–0	0–0	0–0	0–0	0–0	0–0	2–3	1–2	0–0	0–0	0–0	0–0	0 / 5	3–5	38%
WTA 1000
Dubai / Qatar Open (Note: The first Premier 5 event of the year has switched back and forth between the Dubai Tennis Championships and the Qatar Ladies Open since 2009. Dubai was classified as a Premier 5 event from 2009 to 2011 before being succeeded by Doha for the 2012–2014 period. In 2015, Dubai regained its Premier 5 status while Doha was demoted to Premier status. The two tournaments have since alternated status every year.)	NT1		A	A	A	A	A	A	1R	2R	3R	2R	1R	A	1R	Q1	0 / 6	4–6	40%
Indian Wells Open	A		A	A	A	A	A	A	A	Q1	A	A	A	A	NH	A	0 / 0	0–0	–
Miami Open	A		A	A	A	A	A	A	A	Q1	Q1	Q1	A	A	NH	A	0 / 0	0–0	–
Cincinnati Open	Not Tier I			A	A	A	A	A	A	A	Q1	A	A	A	A	A	0 / 0	0–0	–
Career statistics
Tournaments	1		1	1	1	0	0	1	6	8	13	10	3	2	1	4	Career total: 52		
Titles	0		0	0	0	0	0	0	0	0	1	0	0	0	0	0	Career total: 1		
Finals	0		0	0	0	0	0	0	0	0	1	0	0	0	0	0	Career total: 1		
Hard win–loss	0–0		0–0	0–1	0–1	0–0	0–0	0–1	2–5	2–5	5–6	0–5	0–1	0–0	0–1	0–2	1 / 29	9–28	24%
Clay win–loss	0–1		0–1	0–0	0–0	0–0	0–0	0–0	1–1	0–3	7–4	4–5	0–2	0–2	0–0	0–2	0 / 21	12–21	36%
Grass win–loss	0–0		0–0	0–0	0–0	0–0	0–0	0–0	0–0	0–0	0–2	0–0	0–0	0–0	0–0	0–0	0 / 2	0–2	0%
Overall win–loss	0–1		0–1	0–1	0–1	0–0	0–0	0–1	3–6	2–8	12–12	4–10	0–3	0–2	0–1	0–4	1 / 52	21–51	29%
Year-end ranking (Note: 2006: WTA ranking: 668, 2007: WTA ranking: 457)	N/A		390	310	192	197	186	149	141	158	67	158	268	179	176	232	$1,033,327		

== WTA Tour finals ==
=== Singles: 1 (title) ===
Legend Premier / WTA 500 International / WTA 250 (1–0)	Finals by surface Hard (0–0) Clay (1–0)

Result	Date	Tournament	Tier	Surface	Opponent	Score
Win	Apr 2016	İstanbul Cup, Turkey	International	Clay	(Montenegro) Danka Kovinić	3–6, 6–2, 6–3

=== Doubles: 2 (runner-ups) ===
Legend Premier / WTA 500 International / WTA 250 (0–2)	Finals by surface Hard (0–1) Clay (0–1)

Result	W–L	Date	Tournament	Tier	Surface	Partner	Opponents	Score
Loss	0–1	Jul 2014	Bucharest Open, Romania	International	Clay	(Italy) Karin Knapp	(Romania) Elena Bogdan (Romania) Alexandra Cadanțu	4–6, 6–3, [5–10]
Loss	0–2	Jul 2015	İstanbul Cup, Turkey	International	Hard	(Serbia) Jelena Janković	(Russia) Daria Gavrilova (Ukraine) Elina Svitolina	7–5, 1–6, [4–10]

== ITF Circuit finals ==
=== Singles: 33 (12 titles, 21 runner-ups) ===
Legend
$100,000 tournaments
$75,000 tournaments
$50/60,000 tournaments
$40,000 tournaments
$25/35,000 tournaments
$10,000 tournaments

Result	W–L	Date	Tournament	Tier	Surface	Opponent	Score
Loss	0–1	May 2006	ITF Antalya, Turkey	10,000	Hard	(Greece) Anna Gerasimou	3–6, 2–6
Loss	0–2	Sep 2006	ITF Istanbul, Turkey	10,000	Hard	(Russia) Natalia Orlova	1–6, 1–6
Loss	0–3	Apr 2007	ITF Dubai, UAE	10,000	Hard	(Mauritius) Marinne Giraud	2–6, 2–6
Win	1–3	Jun 2007	ITF Istanbul, Turkey	10,000	Hard	(Germany) Ria Dörnemann	6–4, 6–3
Win	2–3	Jun 2008	ITF Gaziantep, Turkey	10,000	Hard	(Turkey) Pemra Özgen	7–5, 6–4
Win	3–3	Jun 2009	ITF Istanbul, Turkey	10,000	Hard	(Russia) Galina Fokina	6–2, 6–3
Win	4–3	May 2010	ITF Kharkiv, Ukraine	25,000	Hard	(Russia) Natalia Orlova	6–4, 6–1
Loss	4–4	May 2010	ITF İzmir, Turkey	25,000	Hard	(Austria) Tamira Paszek	2–6, 3–6
Win	5–4	Jul 2010	ITF Valladolid, Spain	25,000	Hard	(Hong Kong) Zhang Ling	7–6^{(2)}, 6–3
Loss	5–5	Nov 2010	ITF Esperance, Australia	25,000	Hard	(Australia) Sacha Jones	1–6, 3–6
Loss	5–6	Jul 2011	ITF Caceres, Spain	25,000	Hard	(Spain) Garbiñe Muguruza	4–6, 3–6
Loss	5–7	Oct 2011	ITF Netanya, Israel	25,000	Hard	(Germany) Dinah Pfizenmaier	6–7^{(5)}, 6–4, 1–6
Loss	5–8	May 2012	ITF Moscow, Russia	25,000	Hard (i)	(Russia) Margarita Gasparyan	3–6, 6–4, 1–6
Loss	5–9	Jul 2012	ITF Zwevegem, Belgium	25,000	Hard (i)	(Latvia) Anastasija Sevastova	0–6, 3–6
Loss	5–10	Nov 2012	ITF Istanbul, Turkey	25,000	Hard (i)	(Netherlands) Richèl Hogenkamp	4–6, 3–6
Loss	5–11	Jun 2013	ITF Moscow, Russia	25,000	Clay	(Estonia) Anett Kontaveit	1–6, 1–6
Loss	5–12	Mar 2014	ITF Preston, United Kingdom	25,000	Hard (i)	(Czech Republic) Kristýna Plíšková	3–6, 6–7^{(4)}
Win	6–12	Apr 2014	ITF Edgbaston, United Kingdom	25,000	Hard (i)	(France) Pauline Parmentier	6–4, 2–6, 6–2
Loss	6–13	Jul 2014	President's Cup, Kazakhstan	100,000	Hard	(Russia) Vitalia Diatchenko	4–6, 6–3, 2–6
Win	7–13	Sep 2015	Batumi Ladies Open, Georgia	25,000	Hard	(Russia) Alena Tarasova	6–2, 6–0
Win	8–13	Nov 2015	Dubai Tennis Challenge, UAE	75,000	Hard	(Czech Republic) Klára Koukalová	6–7^{(4)}, 6–4, 6–4
Loss	8–14	Dec 2015	Ankara Cup, Turkey	50,000	Hard (i)	(Serbia) Ivana Jorović	6–7^{(3)}, 6–3, 2–6
Win	9–14	Jun 2018	Grado Tennis Cup, Italy	25,000	Clay	(Italy) Martina di Giuseppe	6–2, 6–2
Loss	9–15	Jun 2019	Internacional de Barcelona, Spain	60,000	Clay	(United States) Allie Kiick	6–7^{(3)}, 6–3, 1–6
Loss	9–16	Aug 2019	ITF Las Palmas, Spain	25,000+H	Clay	(Spain) Nuria Párrizas Díaz	5–7, 6–3, 6–7^{(1)}
Win	10–16	Aug 2019	ITF Braunschweig, Germany	25,000	Clay	(Germany) Katharina Gerlach	6–4, 6–2
Win	11–16	Aug 2022	ITF Radom, Poland	25,000	Clay	(Belarus) Vera Lapko	4–1 ret.
Win	12–16	Dec 2022	ITF Monastir, Tunisia	25,000	Hard	(Croatia) Lea Bošković	7–5, 0–6, 6–2
Loss	12–17	Sep 2023	ITF Pazardzhik, Bulgaria	40,000	Clay	(Argentina) María Carlé	1–6, 2–6
Loss	12–18	Aug 2024	ITF Mohammedia, Morocco	35,000	Clay	(Belarus) Kristina Dmitruk	3–6, 7–6^{(5)}, 3–6
Loss	12–19	Oct 2024	ITF Kayseri, Turkey	35,000	Clay	(Chinese Taipei) Joanna Garland	1–6, 6–7^{(1)}
Loss	12–20	Nov 2024	ITF Santo Domingo, Dominican Republic	35,000	Clay	(United States) Clervie Ngounoue	3–6, 6–4, 2–6
Loss	12–21	May 2026	ITF Båstad, Sweden	35,000	Clay	(Netherlands) Britt du Pree	1–6, 1–6

=== Doubles: 24 (15 titles, 9 runner-ups) ===
Legend
$75,000 tournaments
$50/60,000 tournaments
$25,000 tournaments
$10,000 tournaments

Result	W–L	Date	Tournament	Tier	Surface	Partner	Opponents	Score
Win	1–0	May 2006	ITF Antalya, Turkey	10,000	Hard	(Belarus) Alena Bayarchyk	(Russia) Galina Semenova (Belarus) Tatsiana Teterina	6–3, 7–6^{(3)}
Win	2–0	Jun 2007	ITF Istanbul, Turkey	10,000	Hard	(Germany) Ria Dörnemann	(Slovenia) Maja Kambič (Russia) Avgusta Tsybysheva	6–2, 6–4
Win	3–0	May 2008	ITF Gaziantep, Turkey	10,000	Hard	(Turkey) Pemra Özgen	(Belarus) Volha Duko (Georgia (country)) Ana Jikia	2–0 ret.
Win	4–0	Jun 2008	ITF Izmir, Turkey	10,000	Hard	(Turkey) Pemra Özgen	(North Macedonia) Emilia Arnaudovska (Ukraine) Yuliana Umanets	6–2, 6–0
Loss	4–1	Sep 2008	ITF Sarajevo, BiH	25,000	Clay	(Israel) Julia Glushko	(Italy) Alberta Brianti (Slovenia) Polona Hercog	4–6, 5–7
Loss	4–2	Nov 2008	ITF Istanbul, Turkey	25,000	Hard	(Turkey) Pemra Özgen	(Austria) Melanie Klaffner (Bosnia and Herzegovina) Sandra Martinović	4–6, 7–6^{(5)}, [6–10]
Win	5–2	Dec 2008	ITF Vinaròs, Spain	10,000	Clay	(Spain) Lucía Sainz	(Spain) Yera Campos Molina (Spain) Leticia Costas Moreira	6–4, 3–6, [10–7]
Win	6–2	Apr 2009	ITF Antalya, Turkey	10,000	Hard	(Turkey) Pemra Özgen	(Ukraine) Tetyana Arefyeva (Ukraine) Anastasiya Lytovchenko	6–4, 6–2
Loss	6–3	May 2009	ITF Namangan, Uzbekistan	25,000	Hard	(Turkey) Pemra Özgen	(Uzbekistan) Albina Khabibulina (Kyrgyzstan) Ksenia Palkina	4–6, 7–6^{(6)}, [5–10]
Loss	6–4	Jun 2009	ITF Qarshi, Uzbekistan	25,000	Hard	(Turkey) Pemra Özgen	(Ukraine) Kristina Antoniychuk (Georgia (country)) Oksana Kalashnikova	7–5, 0–6, [6–10]
Loss	6–5	Jun 2009	ITF Istanbul, Turkey	10,000	Hard	(Turkey) Pemra Özgen	(Russia) Galina Fokina (Russia) Anna Morgina	4–6, 6–4, [8–10]
Win	7–5	Oct 2009	ITF Antalya, Turkey	10,000	Clay	(Uzbekistan) Albina Khabibulina	(United Kingdom) Amanda Carreras (Italy) Valentina Confalonieri	2–6, 7–5, [10–7]
Loss	7–6	May 2010	ITF Izmir, Turkey	25,000	Hard	(Turkey) Pemra Özgen	(Brazil) Maria Fernanda Alves (Austria) Tamira Paszek	1–6, 2–6
Loss	7–7	Jul 2011	ITF Samsun, Turkey	25,000	Hard	(Turkey) Pemra Özgen	(Romania) Mihaela Buzărnescu (Slovenia) Tadeja Majerič	1–6, 4–6
Win	8–7	Oct 2011	ITF Netanya, Israel	25,000	Hard	(Turkey) Pemra Özgen	(Italy) Nicole Clerico (Israel) Julia Glushko	7–5, 6–3
Win	9–7	Nov 2012	ITF Istanbul, Turkey	25,000	Hard (i)	(Turkey) Pemra Özgen	(Uzbekistan) Nigina Abduraimova (Kyrgyzstan) Ksenia Palkina	6–2, 6–1
Loss	9–8	Jun 2013	ITF Ağrı, Turkey	25,000	Carpet	(Turkey) Pemra Özgen	(Turkey) Melis Sezer (Bosnia and Herzegovina) Jasmina Tinjic	4–6, 6–3, [8–10]
Win	10–8	Sep 2013	GB Pro-Series Shrewsbury, UK	25,000	Hard (i)	(Turkey) Pemra Özgen	(United Kingdom) Samantha Murray (United Kingdom) Jade Windley	4–6, 6–4, [10–8]
Win	11–8	Sep 2013	GB Pro-Series Loughborough, UK	25,000	Hard (i)	(Turkey) Pemra Özgen	(Poland) Magda Linette (Czech Republic) Tereza Smitková	6–2, 5–7, [10–6]
Win	12–8	Nov 2013	ITF Istanbul, Turkey	25,000	Hard (i)	(Turkey) Pemra Özgen	(Georgia (country)) Sofia Shapatava (Ukraine) Anastasiya Vasylyeva	6–3, 6–2
Win	13–8	Dec 2013	Ankara Cup, Turkey	50,000	Hard (i)	(Ukraine) Yuliya Beygelzimer	(Greece) Eleni Daniilidou (Serbia) Aleksandra Krunić	6–3, 6–3
Win	14–8	Nov 2015	Dubai Tennis Challenge, UAE	75,000	Hard	(Greece) Maria Sakkari	(Belgium) Elise Mertens (Turkey) İpek Soylu	7–6^{(6)}, 6–4
Win	15–8	Jan 2021	ITF Fujairah, UAE	25,000	Hard	(Switzerland) Viktorija Golubic	(Chinese Taipei) Liang En-shuo (China) You Xiaodi	5–7, 6–4, [10–4]
Loss	15–9	Jul 2023	Liepāja Open, Latvia	60,000	Clay	(North Macedonia) Lina Gjorcheska	(Latvia) Darja Semenistaja (Latvia) Daniela Vismane	4–6, 6–2, [3–10]

== Fed Cup ==
Büyükakçay debuted for the Turkey Fed Cup team in 2004. Since then, she has a 28–18 singles record and a 13–14 doubles record (41–32 overall).

=== Singles (26–16) ===
Edition	Round	Date	Against	Surface	Opponent	W/L	Result
2006	Z3 RR	26 Apr 2006	Tunisia	Clay	Olfa Dhaoui	W	6–1, 7–5
2007	Z3 RR	23 Apr 2007	Liechtenstein	Hard	Marina Novak	W	6–4, 6–2
2007	Z3 RR	25 Apr 2007	Azerbaijan	Hard	Shukufa Abdullayeva	W	6–0, 6–0
2007	Z3 RR	26 Apr 2007	Mauritius	Hard	Astrid Tixier	W	6–2, 6–2
2008	Z2 RR	30 Jan 2008	Bosnia and Herzegovina	Hard (i)	Mervana Jugić-Salkić	L	4–6, 5–7
2008	Z2 RR	31 Jan 2008	South Africa	Hard (i)	Tarryn Rudman	W	6–4, 6–3
2008	Z2 RPO	2 Feb 2008	Greece	Hard (i)	Eirini Georgatou	W	3–6, 6–4, 6–3
2009	Z2 RR	22 Apr 2009	South Africa	Hard	Lizaan du Plessis	W	6–7^{(7–9)}, 7–5, 6–4
2009	Z2 RR	23 Apr 2009	Georgia	Hard	Margalita Chakhnashvili	L	5–7, 2–6
2010	Z3 RR	21 Apr 2010	Egypt	Clay	Menna El Nagdy	W	6–1, 6–0
2010	Z3 RR	22 Apr 2010	Moldova	Clay	Julia Helbet	W	6–0, 6–1
2010	Z3 PPO	24 Apr 2010	Algeria	Clay	Fatima Zorah Bouabdallah	W	6–1, 6–1
2011	Z2 RR	4 May 2011	Bosnia and Herzegovina	Clay	Jasmina Tinjić	L	6–7^{(3–7)}, 6–4, 5–7
2011	Z2 RR	5 May 2011	Armenia	Clay	Ani Amiraghyan	W	6–3, 6–2
2011	Z2 RR	6 May 2011	Georgia	Clay	Sofia Shapatava	L	3–6, 2–6
2011	Z2 RPO	7 May 2011	Morocco	Clay	Fatima El Allami	W	6–2, 6–1
2012	Z2 RR	18 Apr 2012	Latvia	Clay	Diāna Marcinkēviča	W	6–2, 6–0
2012	Z2 RR	19 Apr 2012	Norway	Clay	Emma Flood	W	6–0, 6–1
2012	Z2 RR	20 Apr 2012	Georgia	Clay	Anna Tatishvili	L	4–6, 2–6
2012	Z2 PPO	21 Apr 2012	South Africa	Clay	Natalie Grandin	W	2–6, 6–2, 6–4
2013	Z1 RR	6 Feb 2013	Israel	Hard	Shahar Pe'er	L	6–1, 1–6, 6–7^{(3–7)}
2013	Z1 RR	7 Feb 2013	Poland	Hard	Agnieszka Radwańska	L	1–6, 2–6
2013	Z1 RR	8 Feb 2013	Romania	Hard	Sorana Cîrstea	L	4–6, 2–6
2013	Z1 RPO	9 Feb 2013	Georgia	Hard	Sofia Shapatava	L	5–7, 3–6
2014	Z1 RR	4 Feb 2014	Belarus	Hard (i)	Olga Govortsova	L	5–7, 6–3, 6–7^{(6–8)}
2014	Z1 RR	6 Feb 2014	Bulgaria	Hard (i)	Elitsa Kostova	W	7–6^{(7–3)}, 6–1
2014	Z1 RR	7 Feb 2014	Portugal	Hard (i)	Michelle Larcher de Brito	L	4–6, 2–6
2015	Z1 RR	4 Feb 2015	Ukraine	Hard (i)	Elina Svitolina	W	6–3, 4–6, 6–0
2015	Z1 RR	5 Feb 2015	Great Britain	Hard (i)	Heather Watson	W	6–2, 3–6, 7–5
2015	Z1 RR	6 Feb 2015	Liechtenstein	Hard (i)	Stephanie Vogt	W	6–2, 6–2
2016	Z1 RR	3 Feb 2016	Israel	Hard	Julia Glushko	W	7–5, 6–3
2016	Z1 RR	4 Feb 2016	Croatia	Hard	Ana Konjuh	W	6–3, 2–6, 6–3
2016	Z1 RR	5 Feb 2016	Estonia	Hard	Anett Kontaveit	L	6–7^{(6–8)}, 4–6
2016	Z1 RPO	6 Feb 2016	Sweden	Hard	Rebecca Peterson	W	2–6, 6–4, 6–0
2017	Z1 RR	8 Feb 2017	Latvia	Hard (i)	Jeļena Ostapenko	L	6–7^{(4–7)}, 7–5, 3–6
2017	Z1 RR	9 Feb 2017	Portugal	Hard (i)	Michelle Larcher de Brito	L	1–6, 6–3, 4–6
2017	Z1 RR	10 Feb 2017	Great Britain	Hard (i)	Johanna Konta	L	7–5, 4–6, 3–6
2018	Z1 RR	7 Feb 2018	Latvia	Hard (i)	Jeļena Ostapenko	W	6–2, 3–6, 6–3
2018	Z1 RR	8 Feb 2018	Austria	Hard (i)	Barbara Haas	W	4–6, 7–6^{(7–5)}, 6–4
2019	Z1 RR	6 Feb 2019	Croatia	Hard (i)	Ana Konjuh	W	7–5, 2–6, 6–3
2019	Z1 RR	7 Feb 2019	Serbia	Hard (i)	Ivana Jorović	L	2–6, 3–6
2019	Z1 RR	8 Feb 2019	Georgia	Hard (i)	Mariam Bolkvadze	W	6–4, 6–1

=== Doubles (13–14) ===
Edition	Round	Date	Partner	Against	Surface	Opponents	W/L	Result
2004	Z3 RR	26 Apr 2004	Pemra Özgen	Romania	Hard	Gabriela Niculescu; Monica Niculescu	L	2–6, 4–6
2004	Z3 RR	27 Apr 2004	Pemra Özgen	Great Britain	Hard	Elena Baltacha; Jane O'Donoghue	L	0–6, 3–6
2005	Z3 RR	28 Apr 2005	Pemra Özgen	Malta	Clay	Stephanie Pace; Stephanie Sullivan	W	6–2, 6–0
2006	Z3 RR	28 Apr 2006	Pemra Özgen	Iceland	Clay	Sigurlaug Sigurdardottir; Iris Staub	W	6–0, 6–0
2007	Z3 RR	25 Apr 2007	Pemra Özgen	Azerbaijan	Hard	Shukufa Abdullayeva; Sevil Aliyeva	W	3–0 ret.
2008	Z2 RR	30 Jan 2008	Pemra Özgen	Bosnia and Herzegovina	Hard (i)	Mervana Jugić-Salkić; Sandra Martinović	L	3–6, 3–6
2008	Z2 RR	31 Jan 2008	Pemra Özgen	South Africa	Hard (i)	Kelly Anderson; Tarryn Rudman	L	6–7^{(2–7)}, 0–6
2008	Z2 RPO	2 Feb 2008	Pemra Özgen	Greece	Hard (i)	Anna Gerasimou; Anna Koumantou	W	6–4, 6–7^{(6–8)}, 6–4
2010	Z3 RR	22 Apr 2010	İpek Şenoğlu	Moldova	Clay	Julia Helbet; Alexandra Perper	W	6–3, 6–0
2011	Z2 RR	6 May 2011	İpek Şenoğlu	Georgia	Clay	Tatia Mikadze; Sofia Shapatava	L	3–2 ret.
2012	Z2 RR	18 Apr 2012	Pemra Özgen	Latvia	Clay	Līga Dekmeijere; Diāna Marcinkēviča	W	6–3, 6–3
2013	Z1 RR	8 Feb 2013	Pemra Özgen	Romania	Hard	Sorana Cîrstea; Raluca Olaru	W	4–2 ret.
2013	Z1 RPO	9 Feb 2013	Pemra Özgen	Georgia	Hard	Margalita Chakhnashvili; Sofia Shapatava	W	7–5, 6–2
2014	Z1 RR	4 Feb 2014	Pemra Özgen	Belarus	Hard (i)	Ilona Kremen; Iryna Shymanovich	L	5–7, 1–6
2014	Z1 RR	6 Feb 2014	Pemra Özgen	Bulgaria	Hard (i)	Elitsa Kostova; Isabella Shinikova	W	5–7, 6–1, 7–5
2014	Z1 RR	7 Feb 2014	Pemra Özgen	Portugal	Hard (i)	Michelle Larcher de Brito; Bárbara Luz	L	6–2, 3–6, 3–6
2014	Z1 PO	9 Feb 2014	Ipek Soylu	Croatia	Hard (i)	Darija Jurak; Tereza Mrdeža	L	6–7^{(4–7)}, 6–4, 3–6
2015	Z1 RR	4 Feb 2015	Ipek Soylu	Ukraine	Hard (i)	Olga Savchuk; Lesia Tsurenko	L	5–7, 1–6
2015	Z1 RR	6 Feb 2015	Pemra Özgen	Liechtenstein	Hard (i)	Sandra Hinterberger; Lynn Zund	W	6–0, 6–0
2015	Z1 PO	7 Feb 2015	Ipek Soylu	Georgia	Hard (i)	Oksana Kalashnikova; Sofia Shapatava	W	4–6, 6–4, 6–4
2016	Z1 RR	3 Feb 2016	Başak Eraydın	Israel	Hard	Julia Glushko; Shahar Pe'er	L	7–5, 5–7, 4–6
2016	Z1 RR	4 Feb 2016	Pemra Özgen	Croatia	Hard	Darija Jurak; Ana Konjuh	L	5–7, 3–6
2016	Z1 RR	5 Feb 2016	Ipek Soylu	Estonia	Hard	Anett Kontaveit; Maileen Nuudi	L	4–6, 2–6
2017	Z1 RR	8 Feb 2017	Ipek Soylu	Latvia	Hard (i)	Diāna Marcinkēviča; Jeļena Ostapenko	L	3–6, 4–6
2017	Z1 RR	9 Feb 2017	Ipek Soylu	Portugal	Hard (i)	Francisca Jorge; Michelle Larcher de Brito	W	6–7^{(3–7)}, 6–3, 6–2
2018	Z1 RR	8 Feb 2018	Ayla Aksu	Austria	Hard (i)	Julia Grabher; Barbara Haas	W	6–2, 7–6^{(7–5)}
2019	Z1 RR	6 Feb 2019	Pemra Özgen	Croatia	Hard (i)	Jana Fett; Darija Jurak	L	4–6, 4–6

- RR = Round robin
- PPO = Promotional play-off
- RPO = Relegation play-off
- PO = Play-off

== Top-10 wins ==
#	Player	Rank	Event	Surface	Round	Score	CB rank
2018
1.	(Latvia) Jeļena Ostapenko	No. 6	Fed Cup, Tallinn, Estonia	Hard (i)	Zone Group 1	6–2, 3–6, 6–3	No. 161

== See also ==
- Turkish women in sports
