= Eugenie Bouchard =

Canadian tennis player (born 1994)

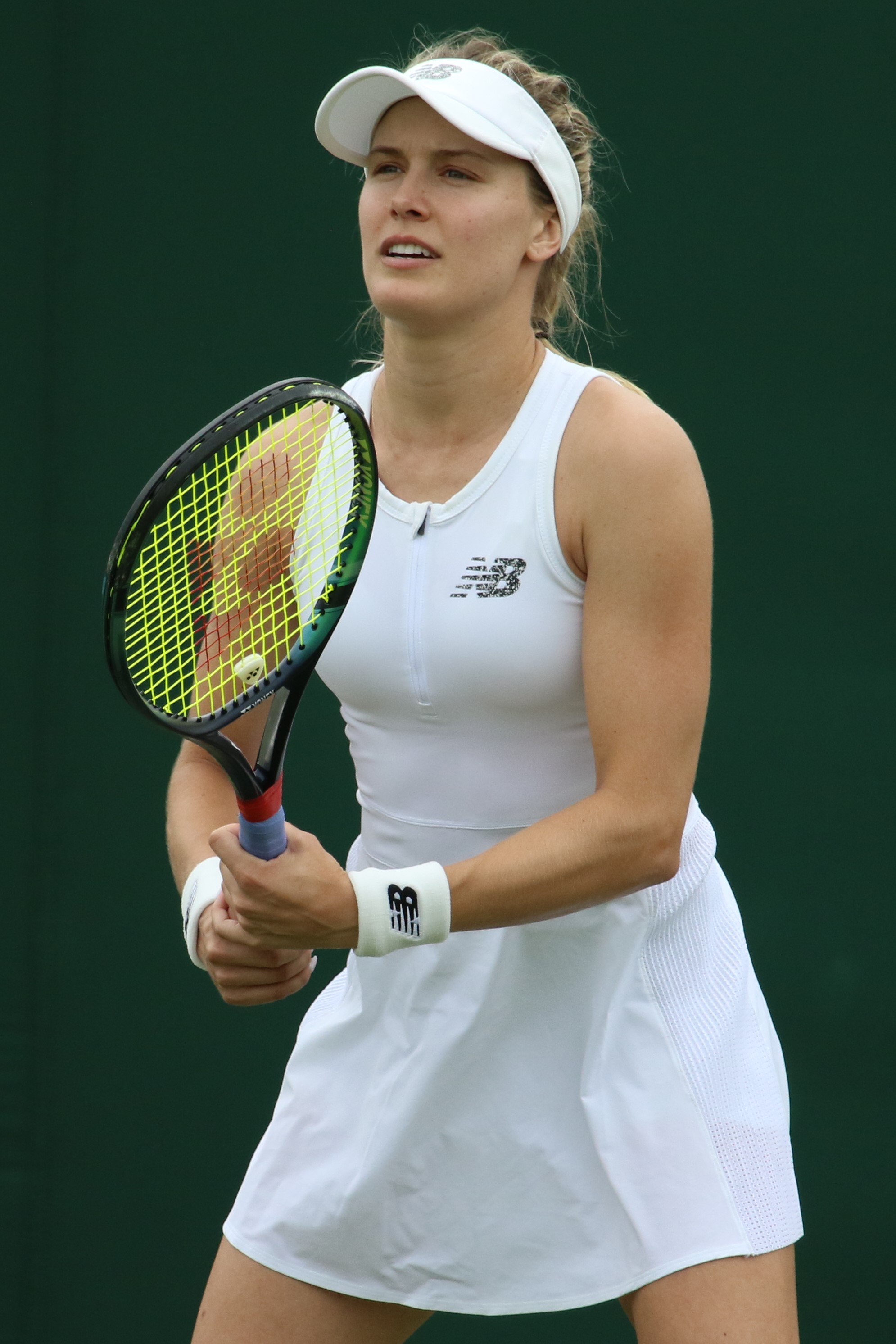
- Bouchard at the 2023 Wimbledon Championships
- Country (sports): Canada
- Residence: Nassau, Bahamas
- Born: February 25, 1994 (age 32) Montreal, Quebec, Canada
- Height: 1.78 m (5 ft 10 in)
- Turned pro: 2009
- Retired: 2025
- Plays: Right (two-handed backhand)
- Coach: Tim Blenkiron (2020–2023)
- Prize money: $6,940,637

Singles
- Career record: 300–230
- Career titles: 1
- Highest ranking: No. 5 (October 20, 2014)

Grand Slam singles results
- Australian Open: SF (2014)
- French Open: SF (2014)
- Wimbledon: F (2014)
- US Open: 4R (2014, 2015)

Other tournaments
- Tour Finals: RR (2014)
- Olympic Games: 2R (2016)

Doubles
- Career record: 66–76
- Career titles: 1
- Highest ranking: No. 103 (August 12, 2013)

Grand Slam doubles results
- Australian Open: 3R (2014)
- Wimbledon: 3R (2013)
- US Open: 2R (2015)

Other doubles tournaments
- Olympic Games: 2R (2016)

Grand Slam mixed doubles results
- French Open: 1R (2015)
- Wimbledon: 1R (2013)
- US Open: 2R (2015)

Team competitions
- BJK Cup: W (2023), record 15–4
- Hopman Cup: RR (2014, 2015, 2018)

Eugenie "Genie" Bouchard (/buːˈʃɑːrd/; French pronunciation: [øʒeni buʃaʁ]; born February 25, 1994) is a Canadian former professional tennis player. At the 2014 Wimbledon Championships, she became the first player representing Canada (Note: Greg Rusedski is Canadian-born and played in the 1997 US Open final, but played for the United Kingdom after May 1995. Mary Pierce is Canadian-born and played in several major finals, but played for France for her entire career.) to reach the final of a major singles tournament, finishing runner-up to Petra Kvitová. Bouchard also reached the semifinals of the 2014 Australian Open and 2014 French Open. Having won the 2012 Wimbledon girls' title as a junior, she was named WTA Newcomer of the Year at the end of the 2013 WTA Tour. She received the WTA Most Improved Player award for the 2014 season and reached a career-high ranking of world No. 5, becoming the first Canadian tennis player to be ranked in the top 5 in singles. She is regarded as one of the best Canadian tennis players of all time.

In 2017 and 2018, Bouchard was ranked No. 10 and No. 9 in Forbes’ World's Highest-Paid Female Athletes list, earning $6.2 million in 2017 and $7.1 million in 2018. She retired from professional tennis after the 2025 Canadian Open. Bouchard began a professional pickleball career in 2024.

== Early life ==
Eugenie Bouchard was born as one of twins to Michel Bouchard, an investment banker, and Julie Leclair in the suburb of Westmount in Montreal.

She started playing tennis at the age of 5 and was a member of Tennis Canada's National Training Centre in Gatineau, Quebec. She grew up in the area of Pleasant Park in Ottawa. At age 12, she moved to Florida to train with coach Nick Saviano.

== Career ==
=== 2005–10: First events on the ITF Circuit ===
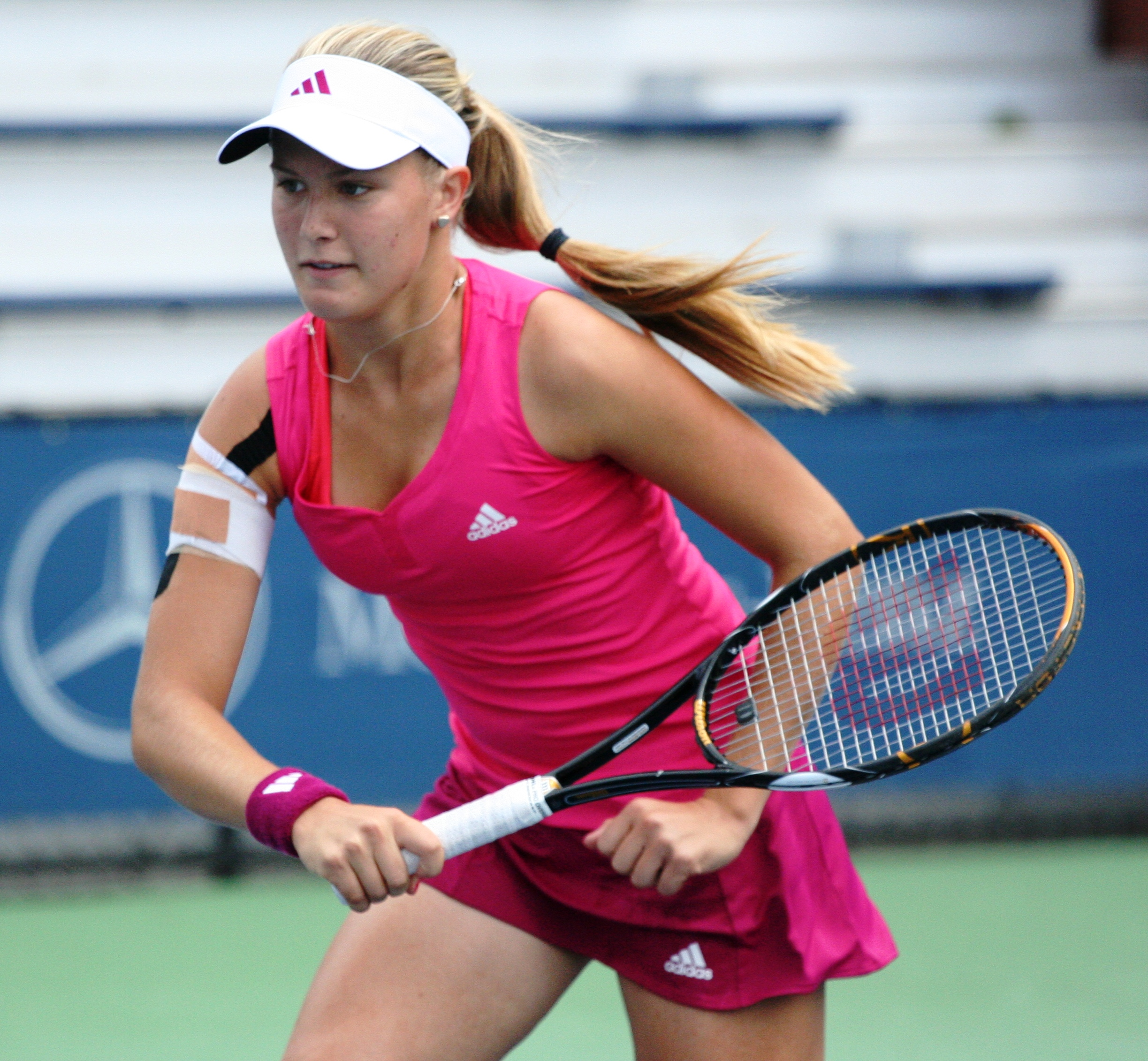
Bouchard at the 2010 US Open

In 2005, Bouchard participated at the tournament Open Super 12 in Auray, France. She captured the singles and doubles titles in Costa Rica and also the All Canadian singles title in Burlington, Ontario in 2008. In 2009 and at only 15, she won the Canadian Under-18 Indoor Championship in Toronto. At this event, Bouchard overpowered fellow Quebecker Marianne Jodoin to become, at 15 years and a month, one of the youngest winners of the indoor event. Later that year, she won her first professional main-draw match at Caserta, Italy, defeating No. 798 Frederica Grazioso. Also in that year, she won the Pan American Closed ITF Championships.

=== 2011: Junior success and first WTA Tour appearance ===
At the Australian Open, she lost in the semifinals of the singles junior event against fifth seed Monica Puig. A week later, she won her first professional title at the $25k Burnie International, where she defeated fellow 16-year-old qualifier Zheng Saisai in the final.

She won her second professional title in April at a $10k event in Šibenik, Croatia, where she defeated qualifier Jessica Ginier in the final. She missed the French Open due to an injury. At Wimbledon, Bouchard lost in the quarterfinals of the junior event to third seed Irina Khromacheva but won the doubles junior event with her partner Grace Min. She also reached a week later her first professional doubles final with Megan Moulton-Levy at the $50k tournament in Waterloo, where she lost. At the end of July, she beat the 114th ranked player Alison Riske at the Citi Open in College Park. It was her first WTA Tour main-draw win. With that win, she had the chance to meet No. 2 seed Nadia Petrova in the second round, but lost the match. Bouchard finished the season ranked No. 302 in the world.

=== 2012: Junior Wimbledon champion ===
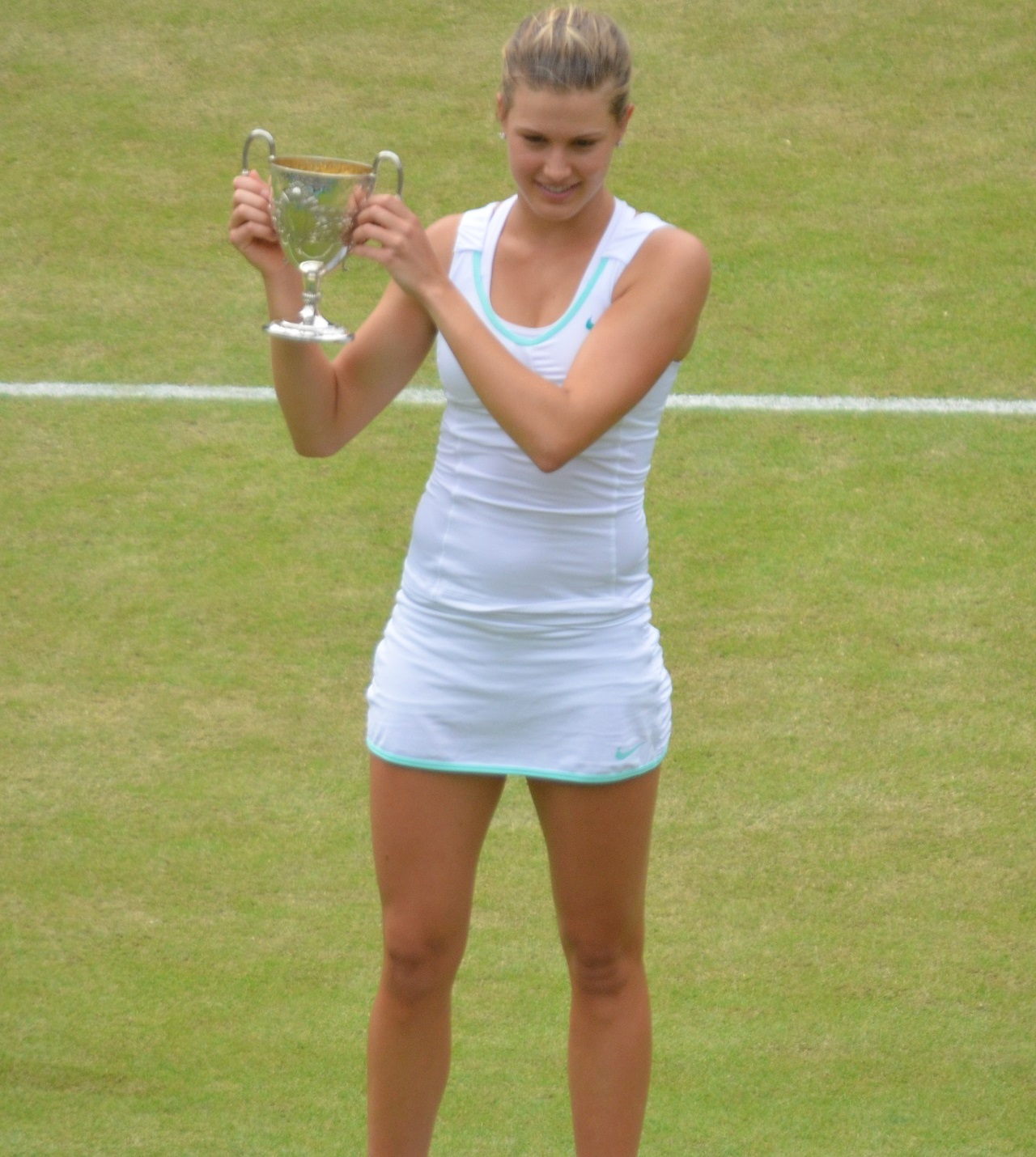
Bouchard with the trophy after her win at the 2012 Wimbledon Championships' junior event

Bouchard reached the semifinals of the junior Australian Open for the second straight year, but lost to Yulia Putintseva. Bouchard won her first professional doubles title at the $50k tournament in Dothan, Alabama with partner Jessica Pegula. They defeated fellow Canadians Sharon Fichman and Marie-Ève Pelletier in the final. In May, Bouchard won her third professional singles title at the $10k in Båstad with a win in the final over Katharina Lehnert. The following week, she won her second straight title in Båstad, where she defeated Milana Špremo in the final. Bouchard won the junior singles title at Wimbledon defeating third seed Elina Svitolina. She became the first Canadian ever, junior or pro, to win a major in singles. She also won the doubles title for the second straight year, this time with American Taylor Townsend, beating Belinda Bencic and Ana Konjuh in the final.

At the end of July, Bouchard won her second $25k and fifth singles title of her career at the Challenger de Granby. She defeated fellow Canadian and defending champion, Stéphanie Dubois, in the final. She played a week later at the Washington Open where she was awarded a wildcard for the main draw. Bouchard made it to the first WTA Tour quarterfinal of her career, but was defeated by Sloane Stephens. At the Rogers Cup, she upset former world No. 11, Shahar Pe'er, in the first round. She then lost in the next round to 2011 French Open champion Li Na. Bouchard reached her first $50k final at the Saguenay Challenger, but lost to Madison Keys. The following week, she won her first $50k title at the Toronto Challenger. She reached the doubles final as well. At her last tournament of the season, Bouchard lost to Jacqueline Cako and Natalie Pluskota in the doubles final of the $75k Phoenix Classic. Bouchard finished the season ranked No. 144 in the world.

=== 2013: Breakthrough ===
For the 2013 season, Bouchard enlisted Nathalie Tauziat to coach and travel with her part-time, and Bouchard transformed her defensive, retrieving tactics from junior level into a game of aggression. Tauziat was let go after the season and Saviano committed to a more present role alongside Bouchard.

At the start of the season, Bouchard attempted to qualify for the main draw at the Sydney International, but lost to Storm Sanders in the first round of qualifying. She played the qualifiers for the Australian Open and was eliminated by Daria Gavrilova in the second round. Bouchard played in the main draw of the Copa Bionaire in Colombia. She beat Laura Thorpe in the opening round but lost to Alexandra Panova in the next round. At the Copa Colsanitas, she had to play the qualifying rounds again. She beat Richèl Hogenkamp in the opening round but the lost to Arantxa Parra Santonja. Bouchard played in the main draw of the Mexican Open in Acapulco where she beat Eva Birnerová in the first round, before she was defeated by defending champion and top seed, Sara Errani. She received a wildcard entry to the Miami Open and beat Shahar Pe'er in her opening match and was defeated in the second round by world No. 2, Maria Sharapova.

At the Family Circle Cup, she successfully qualified for the main draw, and drew fellow qualifier Nastassja Burnett which she won in straight sets. She also defeated world No. 42, Laura Robson, in three sets in the second round, her first top-50 win. Bouchard won her third-round clash against former US Open champion Samantha Stosur (the Australian retired), booking a spot in the quarterfinals of the Premier tournament. It was the first top-10 victory of her career. Although she lost to Jelena Janković, the quarterfinal appearance assured her a spot in the top-100 for the first time. Bouchard went on to play a French Open warm-up tournament, the Internationaux de Strasbourg, where she had one of her most impressive runs on the WTA Tour to date. She made it to the semifinals by defeating Sílvia Soler Espinosa, Camila Giorgi and Anna Tatishvili all in straight sets, but lost to Alizé Cornet. Bouchard made her first major main-draw appearance at the French Open, where she defeated Tsvetana Pironkova in straight sets. Her next opponent was the defending champion Maria Sharapova, who defeated her.

At Wimbledon, Bouchard beat qualifier Galina Voskoboeva in her opening match in three sets. In the second round, she had one of the biggest wins of her career when she beat world No. 12 and former No. 1, Ana Ivanovic, on Centre Court in straight sets. But she was eliminated in the third round by Carla Suárez Navarro. At the beginning of August, Bouchard reached the doubles final at the tournament in Washington, D.C. which was the first WTA final of her career. She was defeated, with partner Taylor Townsend, by Shuko Aoyama and Vera Dushevina in the final. The next week, she made it to the second round for the second straight year at the Rogers Cup and was ultimately defeated by defending champion, Petra Kvitová. At the last Premier-5-event before the US Open, Bouchard reached the second round of the 2013 Western & Southern Open as a qualifier, but lost in three sets to world No. 1, Serena Williams. At the US Open, she was stopped by world No. 9, Angelique Kerber, in the second round. Bouchard made it to the second WTA semifinal of her career at the Challenge Bell in mid-September, but was eliminated by Lucie Šafářová.

At the Premier 5 Pan Pacific Open, Bouchard had a remarkable run. She defeated Monica Puig in the first round and the No. 9 seed, Sloane Stephens, in three sets in the second. In the third round, she beat the former world No. 1 and sixth seed, Jelena Janković, her second win over a member of the top 10, in straight sets to reach her first WTA Premier-5 quarterfinal and fourth WTA quarterfinal of her career. She was defeated by Venus Williams in the next round in over three hours of play. The next week, Bouchard lost to Sloane Stephens in the second round of the WTA Premier Mandatory China Open. At Osaka, she made it to the first WTA singles final of her career and became the first Canadian to reach a WTA singles final since Rebecca Marino in 2011 in Memphis. She ultimately lost to Sam Stosur in the final. At the Luxembourg Open, the last tournament of her season, Bouchard was defeated by Andrea Petkovic in the first round. Bouchard was named the Newcomer of the Year after her breakthrough season, the first Canadian since Carling Bassett-Seguso in 1983 to win the WTA award.

Bouchard finished the season ranked No. 32 in the world. During the 2013 off-season she appeared on CTV Montreal as a guest weather anchor.

=== 2014: First WTA Tour title, major final and top 5 ===
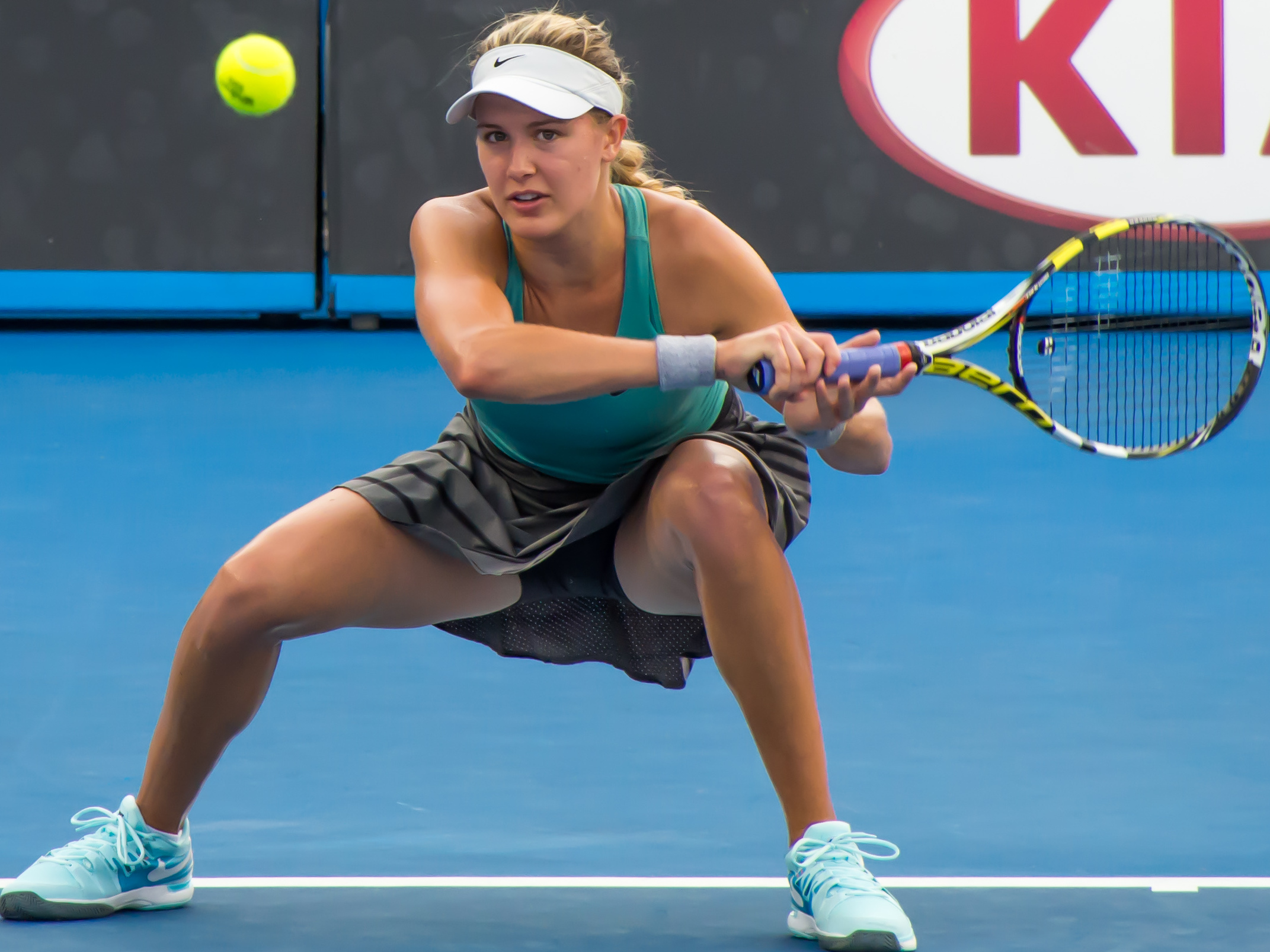
Bouchard at the 2014 Australian Open where she reached her first Grand Slam semifinal and made her top-20 debut

Bouchard started the new season at the Hopman Cup, where she represented Canada with Milos Raonic, followed by a first-round exit at Sydney to Bethanie Mattek-Sands. The next week, Bouchard won her opening match at the Australian Open over wildcard Tang Haochen, followed by wins over Virginie Razzano, Lauren Davis, and Casey Dellacqua to advance to the quarterfinals. In the quarterfinals, Bouchard defeated Ana Ivanovic. She was eliminated in the semifinals by world No. 4, Li Na, but guaranteed herself a spot in the world's top 20 for the first time. Two weeks later, she won both of her singles matches in the Fed Cup World Group II first round against Serbia, helping Canada reach the World Group playoffs for the first time since 2004.

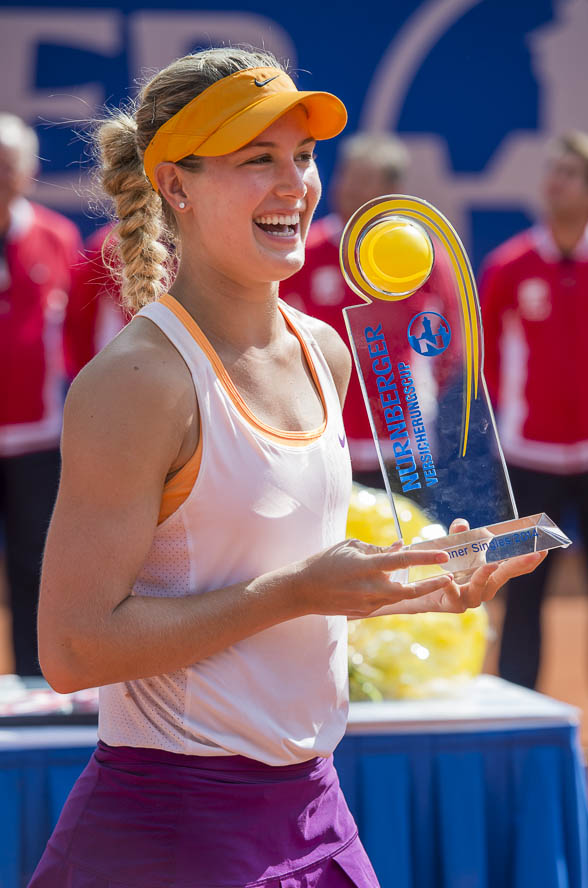
Bouchard during the victory ceremony in Nürnberg

At the Indian Wells Open, Bouchard defeated Peng Shuai in the second round and scored her third win over a member of the top 10 with a victory over Sara Errani in the third round. Her run was stopped by world No. 7, Simona Halep, in the fourth round. Bouchard reached the quarterfinals of the Family Circle Cup for the second straight year with wins over Alla Kudryavtseva and Venus Williams in the second and third rounds, respectively. She then advanced to the semifinals for the first time after defeating world No. 8, Jelena Janković, her fourth win over a top-10 player, but lost to Andrea Petkovic. At the Fed Cup World Group play-offs two weeks later, Bouchard helped Canada get its place in the World Group I, the first time for the country since the introduction of the new World Group format in 1995, by winning her two singles matches. At the Nürnberger Versicherungscup, a French Open warm-up tournament, Bouchard won the first WTA singles title of her career with a victory over Karolína Plíšková in the final. She is the first Canadian to win a WTA singles title since Aleksandra Wozniak at the Stanford Classic in 2008 and the sixth in history.

At the French Open, Bouchard defeated Shahar Pe'er, Julia Görges and Johanna Larsson in the first three rounds to set up a clash with world No. 9, Angelique Kerber, in the round of 16. She won the match in straight sets in only 52 minutes, her fifth victory over a member of the top 10, to reach the quarterfinals. She then defeated Carla Suárez Navarro in three sets, coming back from 2–5 down and 1–4 down in the first and deciding set respectively, to make it to her second consecutive Grand Slam semifinal. In the semifinals, she was eliminated by world No. 8 and eventual tournament winner, Maria Sharapova, in three sets.

Bouchard suffered an opening-round exit at the Rosmalen Open as the third seed, where she lost to Vania King in three sets. At Wimbledon, Bouchard defeated Daniela Hantuchová, Sílvia Soler Espinosa, Andrea Petkovic, Alizé Cornet and Angelique Kerber, all in straight sets, to make it to her third straight major semifinal. In doing so, she became the first WTA player to make the semifinals of the first three majors of the season since Dinara Safina in 2009, and guaranteed her first top-10 ranking following the tournament. She then defeated world No. 3, Simona Halep, in straight sets to become the first Canadian-born player representing Canada to make it into a Grand Slam singles final. She lost in the final to Wimbledon 2011 champion Petra Kvitová in straight sets.

Bouchard was scheduled to start her US Open Series campaign at the Washington Open; however, she withdrew from the tournament citing a right knee injury. She played her first tournament since Wimbledon at the Rogers Cup in her hometown of Montreal. Seeded fifth, she received a first-round bye and faced Shelby Rogers in her opener. Bouchard suffered a shocking three-set loss. Bouchard was the seventh seed at the Cincinnati Open and lost again in three sets in the second round, this time to Svetlana Kuznetsova. At the US Open, she was defeated by Ekaterina Makarova in the fourth round. Bouchard received a main-draw wildcard (after forgetting to enter) to participate in the Hong Kong Open, but pulled out of the tournament due to heat stroke suffered at the US Open. She had been the image of promotion for the tournament and promoted widely. Her last-minute withdrawal sparked criticism, as she had allegedly agreed to appearance fees and signed contracts, to which the WTA responded by fining the tournament official. At the inaugural Wuhan Open, Bouchard reached her first WTA Premier-5 final with wins over Mona Barthel, Alison Riske, Alizé Cornet and No. 7, Caroline Wozniacki. She was defeated by Petra Kvitová in the final, in a rematch of the Wimbledon final.

In October, Bouchard qualified for the 2014 WTA Finals, hosted in Singapore, and was joined by top players Serena Williams, Maria Sharapova, Petra Kvitová, Simona Halep, Agnieszka Radwańska, Ana Ivanovic, and Caroline Wozniacki, but she was eliminated in the round-robin stage. At the end of the 2014 season, she was named the Most Improved Player by the WTA. On November 24, 2014, it was announced that Saviano and Bouchard were parting ways.

Bouchard finished the season ranked No. 7 in the world.

=== 2015: Out of form, concussion at US Open ===
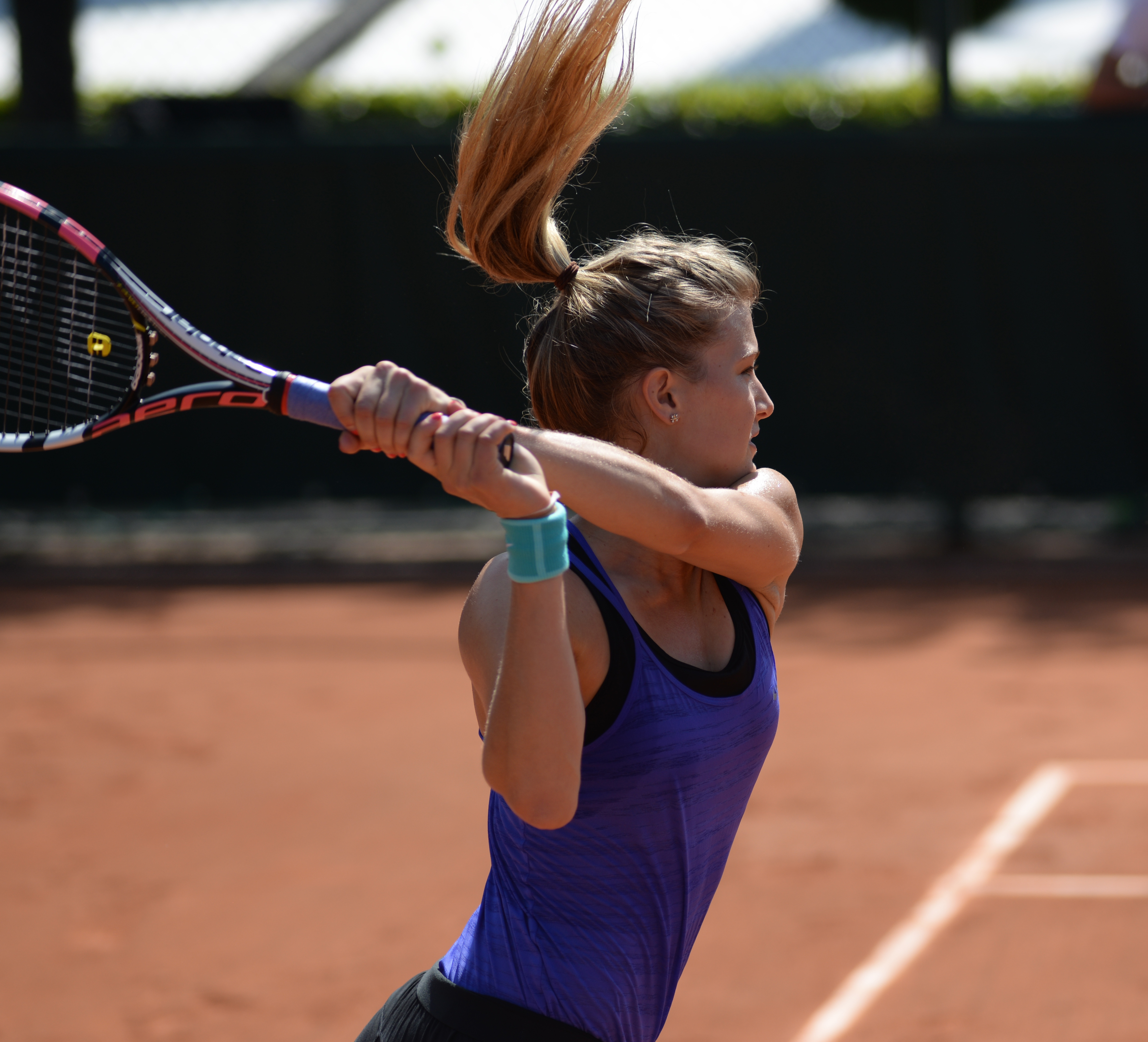
Bouchard in 2015

Bouchard started her season at the Hopman Cup, representing Canada alongside Vasek Pospisil. She lost her first match against the Czech Republic's Lucie Šafářová, and Canada went on to lose the tie. Then, in the tie against the U.S. team, Bouchard beat Serena Williams, while Pospisil beat John Isner to give Canada the win. They defeated Italy in the last tie, but despite the win, they finished second in the group and were eliminated. At the Australian Open, Bouchard lost in the quarterfinals to Maria Sharapova in straight sets. On February 5, 2015, Bouchard began working with Sam Sumyk, who had previously coached Victoria Azarenka to major success.

Bouchard, the top seed at Diamond Games at Antwerp, was eliminated in the second round by Mona Barthel after a first-round bye. At Indian Wells, Bouchard was eliminated in the fourth round by qualifier Lesia Tsurenko. A week later in Miami, after a first-round bye, Bouchard was defeated in the second round by yet another qualifier, Tatjana Maria in straight sets.

Bouchard began her clay-court season at the Family Circle Cup. After receiving a bye in the first round, she lost in the second round to unseeded Lauren Davis in straight sets. Bouchard then participated in Fed Cup, representing team Canada. She went on to lose both of her singles matches to Romanians Alexandra Dulgheru and Andreea Mitu. Canada was hence relegated to the World Group II division.

Bouchard lost her first-round match against Barbora Strýcová at the Madrid Open, after winning the first set and up with a break in the second, which put her losing streak at the time at six matches. The next week at the Italian Open, she won her first match since March defeating Zarina Diyas in the second round, but lost in the next round to eventual finalist Carla Suárez Navarro. At the French Open, Bouchard was eliminated in the first round, losing to Kristina Mladenovic.

Her losing streak continued when she lost in the first round to Yaroslava Shvedova at the Rosmalen Open as a wildcard entry and top seed, then in the second round of the Birmingham Classic yet again to Mladenovic after getting bagelled in the third set, having received a first-round bye. Bouchard won her first match on grass defeating Alison Riske in the second round in Eastbourne. However, she was forced to retire against eventual champion, Belinda Bencic, in round three with an abdominal injury. Bouchard next headed to Wimbledon as the defending finalist and the 12th seed. She was taken down in straight sets by qualifier Duan Yingying in the opening round, her second consecutive first-round loss at a major event. This loss would push her down to No. 26, her first time out of the top 20 since her semifinal appearance at the 2014 Australian Open. After just six months, Sumyk was fired by Bouchard as coach.

At the Rogers Cup in August, her first tournament in more than a month, Bouchard was again defeated by eventual champion, Belinda Bencic, in the first round. At the Western & Southern Open the next week, she progressed to the second round over Kateryna Bondarenko in two tie-breaks, her first match win since June, but was immediately eliminated by eventual semifinalist Elina Svitolina. In New Haven, Bouchard was defeated easily in the first round by Roberta Vinci.

At the US Open, Bouchard defeated Alison Riske and Polona Hercog in the first and second round, respectively, which became her first back-to-back wins since March at the Indian Wells Open. In the third round, Bouchard defeated Dominika Cibulková in three-sets to reach the second week at the US Open for the second straight year. The tournament was seen as Bouchard's return to form, as she was also advancing in the doubles and mixed doubles. Bouchard was scheduled to play Roberta Vinci in the fourth round, but was forced to withdraw due to a concussion, an injury she suffered after slipping and falling in the locker room. A subsequent lawsuit was filed against the United States Tennis Association (USTA), with the parties reaching settlement in 2018. Bouchard withdrew from other tournaments, citing effects from the concussion and she played only one match for the remainder of 2015. That match was against Andrea Petkovic at the 2015 China Open, a match Bouchard retired from in the second set due to dizziness.

Bouchard finished the season ranked No. 48 in the world.

=== 2016: Mixed results ===
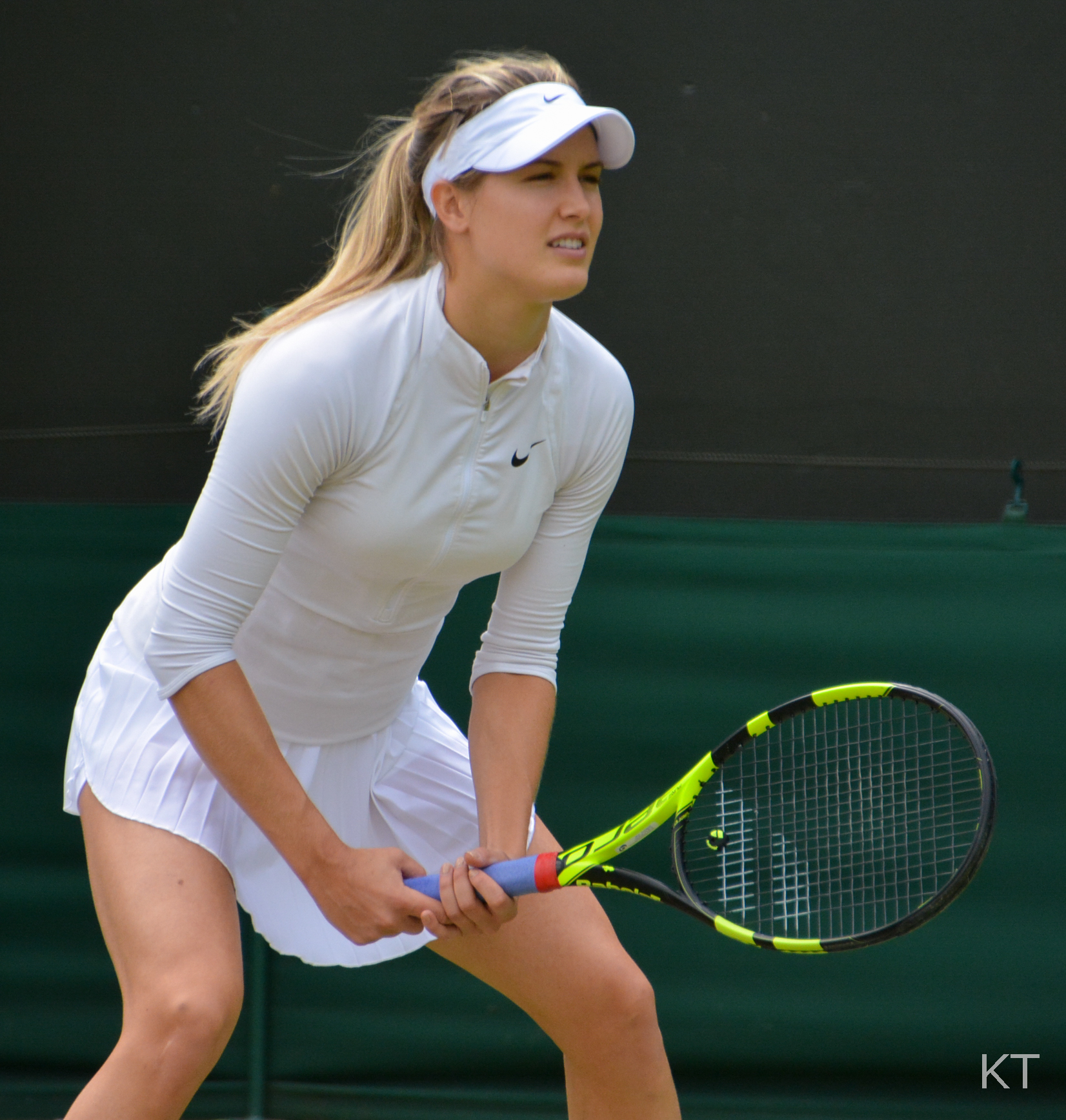
Bouchard in 2016

After over three months since her last match, Bouchard started the new season at the Shenzhen Open, winning in the first two rounds over Donna Vekić and Nicole Gibbs, respectively. She was defeated by Tímea Babos in the quarterfinals. The following week at the Hobart International, she had her most decisive victory in almost a year, beating Bethanie Mattek-Sands with the loss of just three games, followed by a straight-set win over Alison Van Uytvanck to bring her into her second straight quarterfinal of the year. She then defeated Camila Giorgi and Dominika Cibulková to reach her first final since the 2014 Wuhan Open; however, she lost in straight sets to Alizé Cornet.

Bouchard next played the Australian Open, where she was unseeded at a Grand Slam tournament for the first time since 2013. She won her opening match against Aleksandra Krunić, before falling to world No. 4, Agnieszka Radwańska, in the second round. In February, she reached the third round of the Qatar Ladies Open, before falling to Zheng Saisai in straight sets. In March at the Malaysian Open, Bouchard advanced to her second final of the season in which she was defeated by Elina Svitolina, in three sets.

At Indian Wells, she lost in the third round to Timea Bacsinszky. After mutually parting ways with Thomas Högstedt, Bouchard re-hired Saviano as coach prior to the clay-court season. At the French Open, she advanced to the second round but lost to Bacsinszky again, despite leading 4–1 in the first set. After the match, Bouchard publicly admitted that her struggles on the court the previous year had led to her struggling to eat properly. This sparked rumours that she had developed an eating disorder, which she soon denied.

Grass-court season began for Bouchard with a loss to qualifier Elise Mertens at the Rosmalen Open in which she won just two games. She went on to be eliminated at the second round of the Mallorca Open by Anastasija Sevastova and then reached the third round at Eastbourne, losing again to Radwanska. At Wimbledon, she beat Magdaléna Rybáriková in straight sets, in a match that began on the outside courts but was finished under the closed roof of Centre Court due to an extremely long rain delay. Less than 24 hours later, she was back on Centre Court and won back-to-back matches in a Grand Slam for the first time this year, defeating Johanna Konta in three sets. In the third round, she lost in straight sets to Dominika Cibulková.

At her home tournament, the Rogers Cup, Bouchard advanced to the third round with wins over Lucie Šafářová and world No. 10, Dominika Cibulková. Her run was stopped by qualifier Kristína Kučová. She next competed at the Summer Olympics in Rio, and won her opening match over Sloane Stephens, but was defeated by world No. 2, Angelique Kerber, in the next round. She also reached the second round in doubles with Gabriela Dabrowski. At the US Open, Bouchard lost to Kateřina Siniaková in the first round. Bouchard finished the season ranked No. 47 in the world.

=== 2017: Continued struggles with form ===
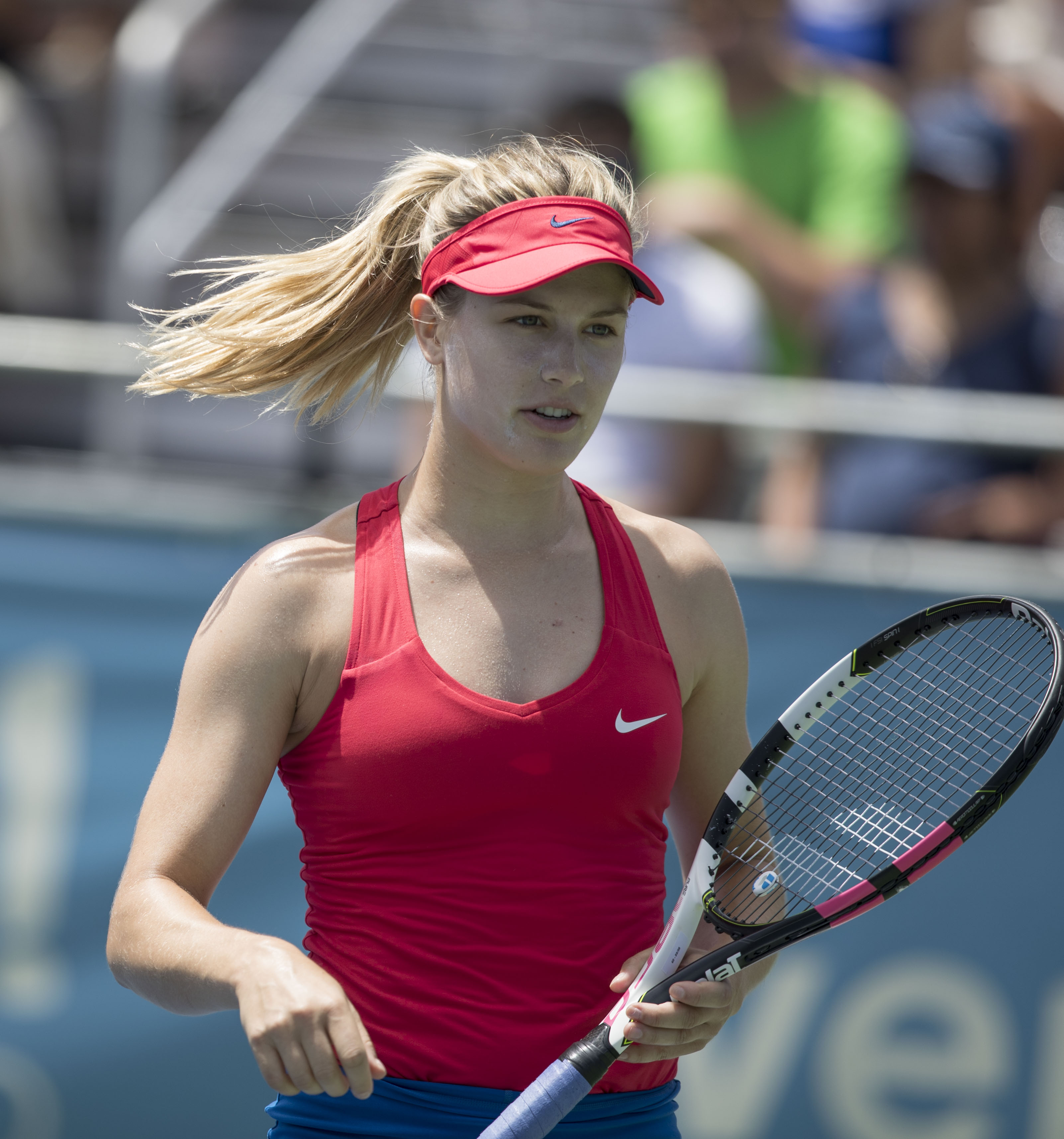
Bouchard at the 2017 Washington Open

Bouchard started the year by playing at the Brisbane International. She was defeated in the first round by Shelby Rogers. At the Sydney International, Bouchard defeated world No. 23, Zhang Shuai, in the first round and world No. 6, Dominika Cibulková, in straight sets, to set up a quarterfinal meeting with world No. 27, Anastasia Pavlyuchenkova, whom she also beat. She then lost her first semifinal since February 2016 to world No. 10, Johanna Konta. At the Australian Open, Bouchard defeated Louisa Chirico and Peng Shuai in her first two matches, but lost to CoCo Vandeweghe in three sets in round three. She lost in the first round of her next four tournaments, the Mexican Open, Indian Wells Open, Miami Open and Monterrey Open, respectively.

Bouchard made a return to the ITF Circuit for the first time in nearly four years at the $80k event in Indian Harbour Beach, but was defeated by Victoria Duval in the quarterfinals. Two weeks later, she lost in the opening round of the İstanbul Cup to Jana Čepelová. In May at the Premier Mandatory Madrid Open, she won her first tour-level match since the Australian Open in January with a victory over Alizé Cornet. She then defeated Maria Sharapova in the second round, to set up a match with world No. 2, Angelique Kerber, in the third round. Bouchard won the first set and was up 5–0 in the second, before Kerber had to retire with a left thigh injury. Her run was ended by world No. 9, Svetlana Kuznetsova, in the quarterfinals. At the French Open, she won her first-round match over Risa Ozaki but was defeated by Anastasija Sevastova in the second. Bouchard lost in the opening round of the Wimbledon Championships to Carla Suárez Navarro. At the Washington Open in August, she reached her second WTA doubles final but lost to Shuko Aoyama and Renata Voráčová, with partner Sloane Stephens. In October, at her last tournament of the season, the Luxembourg Open, she and partner Kirsten Flipkens advanced to the doubles final but were defeated by Lesley Kerkhove and Lidziya Marozava. In December, it was announced that trial for Bouchard's lawsuit against the USTA (regarding the alleged head injury caused to Bouchard by the slippery surface in a physiotherapy room at the 2015 US Open) would take place in late February 2018, and was expected to last around ten days.

Bouchard finished the season ranked No. 81 in the world.

=== 2018: Out of top 100, late resurgence ===
After parting company with coach Thomas Högstedt towards the end of 2017, Bouchard began working with Harold Solomon. She teamed up with Vasek Pospisil to compete at the Hopman Cup for Canada, but failed to win a single match in the competition, losing all three of her singles games in straight sets, and picking up a buttock injury during her last match against Elise Mertens. Bouchard's losing streak continued at the Hobart International when she was beaten again in straight sets by Aryna Sabalenka, a result that meant Bouchard fell out of the WTA top 100 for the first time since 2013.

At the Australian Open, she defeated Océane Dodin in the opening round, before losing to world No. 1, Simona Halep, in the second. Following several poor results at the front-end of the season, including failure to qualify at the French Open, Bouchard's world ranking plummeted to 194 in early June, her lowest ranking in six years. She slowly improved her ranking over the coming months, starting with qualifying into main draw of Wimbledon, where she lost in the second round to Ashleigh Barty. Bouchard followed this up with a semifinal appearance at the Ladies Championship Gstaad, where she retired injured against Alizé Cornet.

At the US Open, she dropped just seven games in three qualifying matches in front of packed crowds. In the main draw, she continued her dominance from qualifying, dispatching French wildcard Harmony Tan for the loss of just four games. Bouchard was then ousted from the tournament in the second round, falling to Markéta Vondroušová in straight sets.

Bouchard again struggled following the US Open, failing to win a main-draw match at her next four tournaments. Her form turned at the Luxembourg Open, where she won through three qualifying matches and then defeated Tímea Babos, Carla Suárez Navarro and Andrea Petkovic to set up a semifinal clash with top seed Julia Görges. Despite serving for the match at 5–3 in the second set, Bouchard ultimately lost in three sets. The result, however, moved her inside the top 100. Bouchard finished the season ranked No. 89 in the world.

=== 2019: Maiden doubles title, losing streak and rankings decline ===
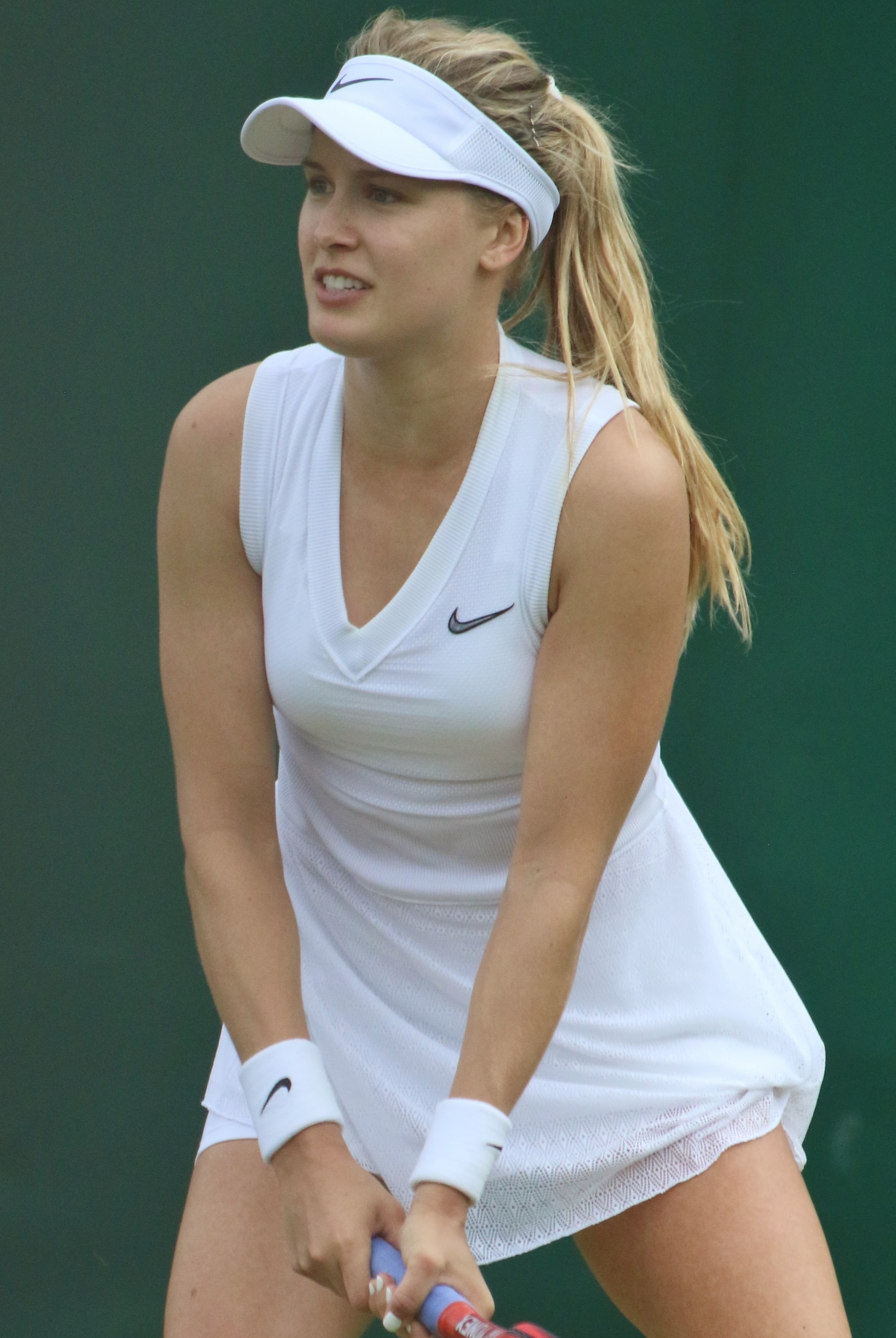
Bouchard at the 2019 Wimbledon Championships

Bouchard began the season at the Auckland Open in New Zealand where she made the quarterfinals, before losing to top seed Julia Görges. Bouchard also played doubles at the event, partnering American Sofia Kenin. The pair would go on to win the tournament, earning Bouchard her first doubles title on the WTA Tour.

At the Australian Open, Bouchard made short work of Peng Shuai in the opening round, before falling to Serena Williams in the second. With an early exit at the Australian Open, she opted to compete on the WTA Challenger Tour at the Newport Beach Challenger. Seeded third, she progressed to the quarterfinals, where she was defeated by fellow Canadian and eventual champion, Bianca Andreescu.

In February, Bouchard was awarded a wildcard into the Premier-5 Dubai Championships. She defeated Vera Lapko in the first round, before losing to third seed Simona Halep in the second round. Bouchard subsequently failed to win a match at Indian Wells, Miami, French Open, Eastbourne, Wimbledon, Lausanne, Washington, the Rogers Cup, Vancouver and the Bronx Open to extend her losing-streak to 11 matches across WTA Tour, qualifying and ITF Circuit matches. At the US Open, Bouchard's lost in straight sets to 12th seed Anastasija Sevastova in the first round. Bouchard's ranking fell outside the top 150, following her loss at the US Open.

In September at the Central Coast Open, Bouchard, seeded third went out of the ITF tournament in the opening round to world No. 272, Gabriela Talaba. Following her continued poor results, her ranking slumped to 224 in the world. Bouchard returned to the singles circuit at the WTA 125 Houston Challenger. At the event, Bouchard ended her 13-match losing streak and won her first match at any level in nine months, defeating Valentini Grammatikopoulou, in straight sets. She also won through her second-round match against eighth seed Francesca Di Lorenzo, following Di Lorenzo's retirement in the second set. Bouchard's tournament came to an end in the third round when she retired three games into her match against Mandy Minella following a foot injury.

Bouchard finished the season ranked No. 224 in the world.

=== 2020: First WTA Tour final in four years, French Open 3rd round ===
At the Auckland Open, for which she was granted a wildcard, Bouchard showed some signs of a return to form. She defeated Kirsten Flipkens and eighth seed Caroline Garcia in straight sets, before losing a to Amanda Anisimova in the quarterfinals. Bouchard entered the Australian Open qualifying unseeded, where she won her first two matches against You Xiaodi and Maddison Inglis before slumping to a disappointing straight sets loss in the final qualifying round against Martina Trevisan.

After the hiatus from tennis due to the COVID-19 pandemic, she returned to tennis at the Prague Open where she showed more signs of a return to form by upsetting eighth seed Veronika Kudermetova in the first round. She then defeated Tamara Zidanšek in three sets to make her second tour level quarterfinal of 2020. However, she was defeated in three sets by the eventual runner-up and third seed, Elise Mertens.

At the İstanbul Cup, Bouchard qualified for the main draw and made a subsequent run to the final of the event, upsetting top seed Svetlana Kuznetsova along the way. She faced unseeded Romanian Patricia Maria Țig in the final, losing in three competitive sets. Despite the loss, Bouchard launched up the rankings more than 100 places to No. 167 in the world, earning a wildcard into the French Open in the process.

At the postponed French Open, Bouchard made it to the third round, before losing to eventual champion Iga Świątek, in straight sets. Bouchard finished the season ranked No. 141 in the world.

=== 2021: Eighth career final, shoulder surgery ===
Bouchard started her 2021 season at the Australian Open in the qualifying draw, but was defeated in the second round to Yuan Yue in straight sets.

In March, Bouchard received a wildcard at the Abierto Zapopan and made her way to her eighth career WTA final, but lost to fourth seed Sara Sorribes Tormo in straight sets. The result improved Bouchard's ranking to world No. 116. Bouchard later revealed that she suffered a tear in her right shoulder during her first-round match against Caroline Dolehide, which would later require arthroscopic surgery in June. The injury ended Bouchard's 2021 season.

Bouchard finished the season ranked No. 246 in the world. While rehabbing from shoulder surgery, Bouchard began working as a color commentator for The Tennis Channel.

=== 2022: No world ranking, 17-month hiatus and return from injury ===
Bouchard continued to rehab her shoulder to begin 2022, missing both the Australian Open and French Open. By May, she was without a world ranking. In June, Bouchard announced her comeback to tennis and signalled her intentions to compete at Wimbledon via a protected ranking. Bouchard later decided to withdraw from Wimbledon due to the WTA's decision to not award ranking points at the 2022 Championships.

In August, Bouchard officially made her return to the tour and competed in her first match in 17 months at the Vancouver Open, where she lost to Arianne Hartono in straight sets. At the US Open, Bouchard attempted to qualify for the main draw but was eliminated in the second round by Czech fourth seed Linda Nosková, in straight sets.

Bouchard received a wildcard at the Chennai Open where she reached the quarterfinals, after recording two straight sets win over Joanne Züger and Karman Thandi. She then lost to Nadia Podoroska in three sets. The result improved Bouchard's ranking to No. 502 in the world. In October, she qualified for the WTA 500 event in Ostrava, defeating two top 100 players in impressive fashion. In the main draw, she lost in three close sets to sixth seed Belinda Bencic in the first round.

At the WTA 1000 event in Guadalajara, Bouchard received a wildcard into the main draw and defeated American qualifier Kayla Day in the first round. She then lost to 12th seed Jeļena Ostapenko in three sets. Bouchard finished the season ranked No. 323 in the world.

=== 2023: BJK Cup champion ===
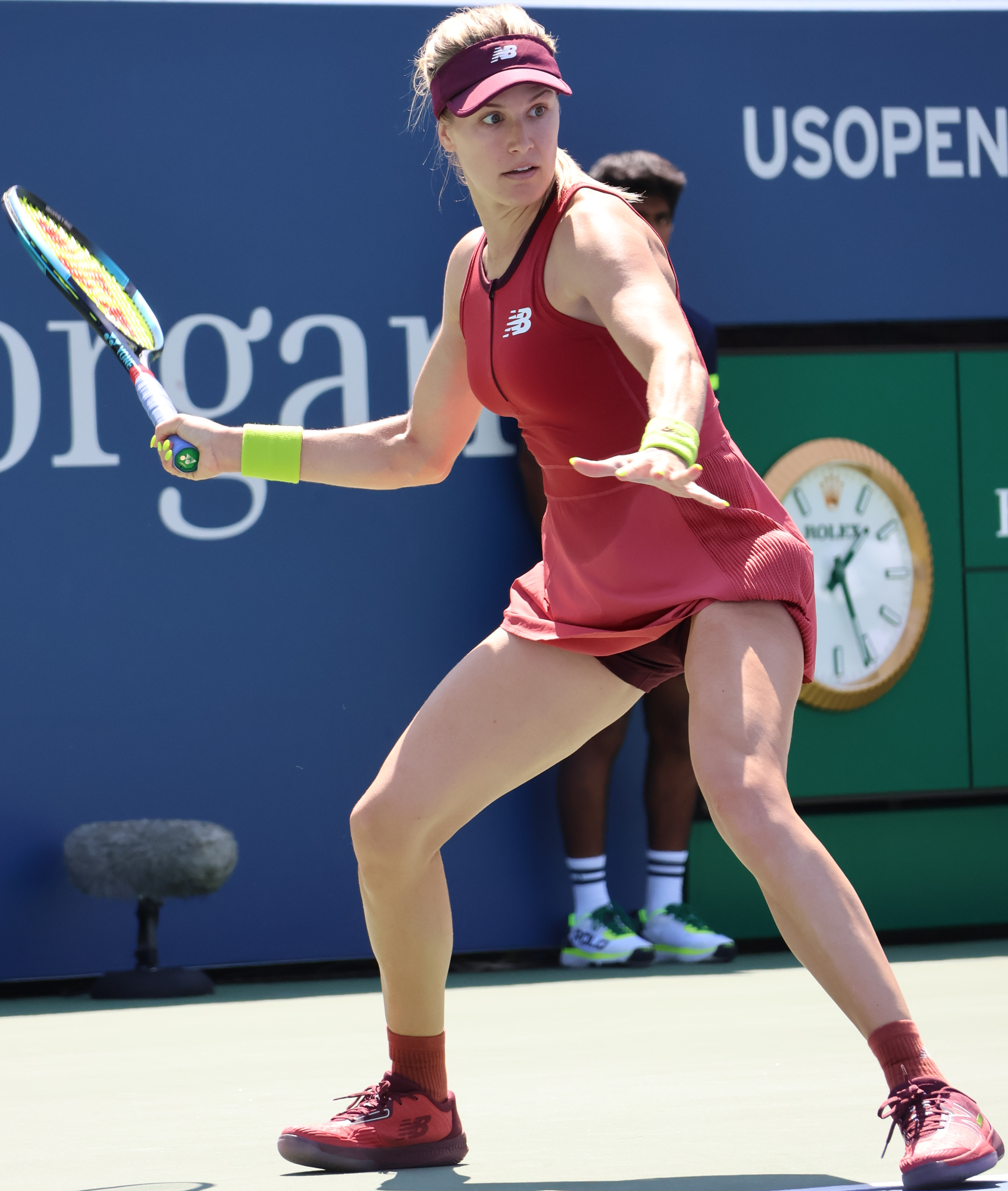
Bouchard at the 2023 US Open

Bouchard started her 2023 season with a wildcard entry into the qualifying draw of the Auckland Open. Despite a strong opening-round win against 11th seed Ann Li, Bouchard was forced to withdraw from the tournament before the second round of qualifying, after suffering a bout of food poisoning.

At the Australian Open, she used her protected ranking to enter the qualifying draw, however, she was defeated in the first round by American Ashlyn Krueger, in three sets.

She used her protected ranking to enter the main draw at the Madrid Open and defeated Dayana Yastremska in the first round, before losing her next match to Martina Trevisan.

Bouchard withdrew from the French Open, giving no clear reason. In the qualifying rounds for Wimbledon, she lost in the first round to Greet Minnen in straight sets. She was eliminated in the second round of qualifying for the US Open by Dayana Yastremska.

Given a wildcard entry into the main-draw at the Guadalajara Open Akron, Bouchard overcame Renata Zarazúa to reach the second round, where she lost to Veronika Kudermetova in three sets.

Bouchard was named to the Canadian team during the BJK Cup Finals in November 2023. She won both doubles matches she played, contributing to Team Canada's victory. This marks the first time Canada has won the competition.

=== 2024–25: Sporadic appearances and retirement ===
Bouchard made her first appearance on a professional tennis court for six months at an ITF event in Florida in May 2024, where she reached the quarterfinals but retired at the start of the third set against top seed Kayla Day.

Given a wildcard entry, she partnered Sloane Stephens in the doubles at the 2024 Washington Open, losing in the first round.

Bouchard lost in the first round of qualifying at the 2024 Canadian Open to Moyuka Uchijima. That would prove to be her last match for almost a year until the 2025 Hall of Fame Open, where, entering as a wildcard, she lost to Anna Rogers in the first round.

On 16 July 2025, Bouchard announced that she would retire from professional tennis after the Canadian Open in Montreal, which she had entered as a wildcard. Writing on social media she said: : “You’ll know when it’s time. For me, it’s now. Ending where it all started: Montreal.”

Partnering Clervie Ngounoue, she was given a wildcard into the doubles at the Washington Open, but lost to fellow wildcard entrants, Hailey Baptiste and Venus Williams, in the first round.

At the 2025 Canadian Open, she started her farewell tournament with a first round win over Emiliana Arango in three sets which marked her 300th Tour win. Bouchard lost in the second round to 17th seed Belinda Bencic also in three sets.

== World TeamTennis ==
Bouchard has played four seasons with World TeamTennis starting in 2009 when she debuted in the league with the Kansas City Explorers, followed by a season with the Texas Wild in 2013, the New York Empire in 2017, and the Orange County Breakers in 2019. It was announced that she will be joining the Chicago Smash for their debut season, during the 2020 WTT season set to begin July 12 at The Greenbrier.

Bouchard was dominant for the Smash in women's doubles with Bethanie Mattek-Sands during the 2020 season, finishing the season with an 11–5 record, helping the Smash to earn a No. 2 seed in WTT Play-offs. The Smash defeated the Orlando Storm in the semifinals before falling to the New York Empire in a super-tiebreaker for the championship.

== Playing style ==
Bouchard employs a high-risk, aggressive playing style, focused on her powerful groundstrokes, that is played from the baseline. During her 2014 breakout season, Bouchard was noted for her ability to hit the ball hard, flat, and early on the rise, allowing her to defeat multiple top 10 players and run deep into Grand Slams. Her two-handed backhand is her strongest groundstoke, and can penetrate deep into the court, allowing her to push her opponents behind the baseline. Her forehand is notable for its condensed swing, allowing her to generate considerable power, and is especially effective when utilised to redirect power down the line. However, the condensed forehand swing also reduces the level of control Bouchard has over her forehand, which can result in the accumulation of unforced errors when employing this shot. Her first serve is powerful, averaging 103 mph (166 km/h), and having been recorded as high as 111 mph (179 km/h), allowing her to serve aces. Her second serve typically averages 84 mph (135 km/h). Due to her aggressive playing style, she rarely incorporates drop shots, lobs, or sliced backhands into points. Due to her doubles experience, Bouchard is able to volley efficiently, although she rarely approaches the net when she plays singles matches. She has been noted for her fighting attitude and determination.

== Endorsements, sponsors and equipment ==
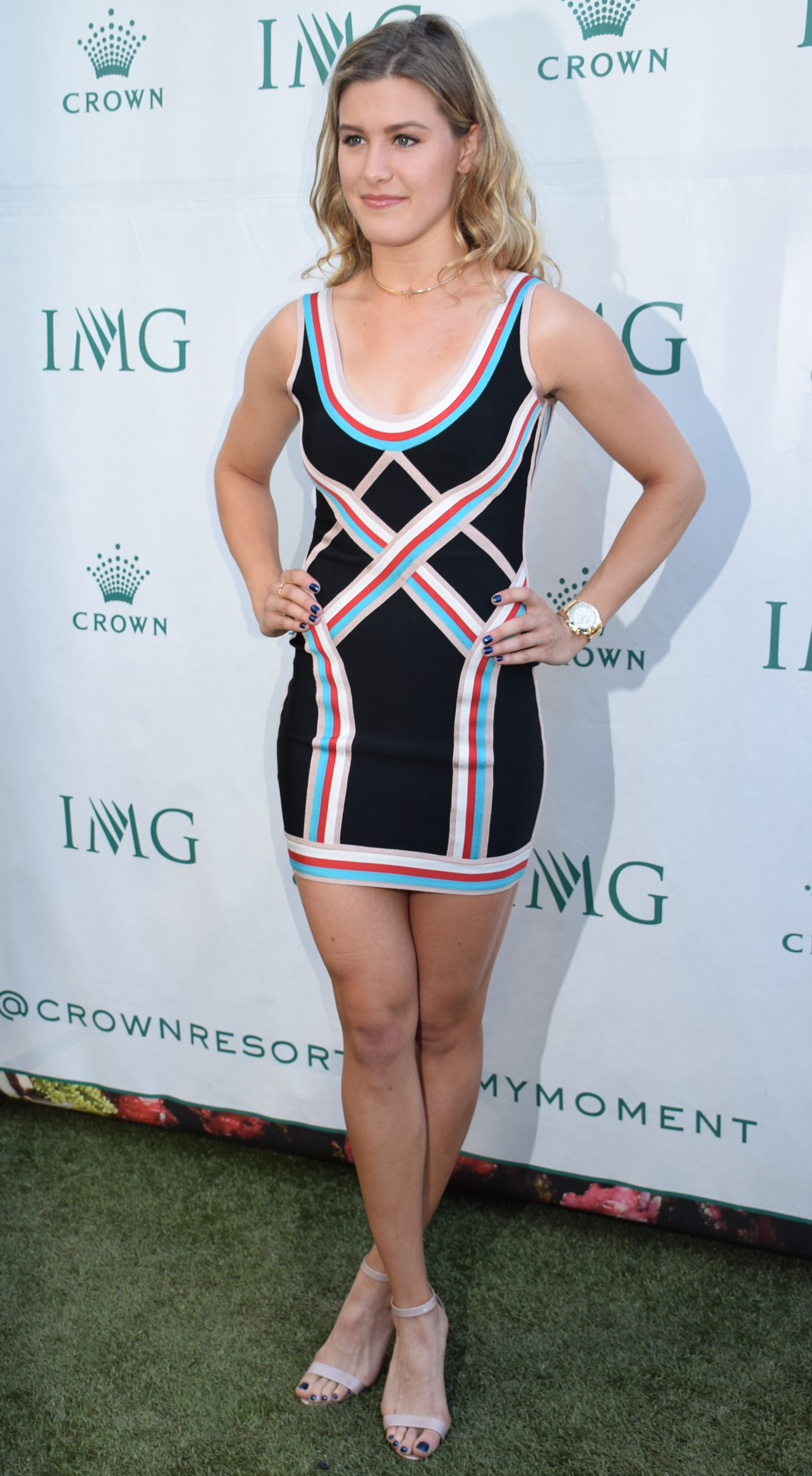
Bouchard at the Australian Open Players' Party in 2016

After her breakout grand slam final appearance at the 2014 Wimbledon Championships, Bouchard signed a three-year endorsement deal with Coca-Cola, following earlier agreements with Rogers Communications and equipment sponsors Nike and Babolat. In June 2015, Bouchard signed a multi-year partnership with Aviva Canada. Bouchard has used numerous racquets throughout the years–as a junior, Bouchard used various iterations of the Wilson Blade. As a professional player, she typically used the Babolat Pure Aero, doing so between 2013 and 2018, switching briefly to the Babolat Pure Drive in 2017; she also used the Head Graphene Radical between 2017 and 2018. After her contract with Babolat expired in 2018, Bouchard briefly used the Wilson Ultra 100. Bouchard uses Yonex racquets, having endorsed the Yonex VCORE 100 racquet since late 2018. She is endorsed by New Balance. In 2017 and 2018, she was ranked #10 and #9 in Forbes’ World's Highest-Paid Female Athletes list, earning $6.2 million in 2017 and $7.1 million in 2018.

Bouchard was ranked No. 1 by SportsPro in their "World's 50 Most Marketable Athletes 2015 list", toppling the likes of Neymar, Steph Curry, and Usain Bolt on the list.

== Personal life ==
Bouchard has a twin sister, Beatrice, who is six minutes older. She also has two younger siblings, sister Charlotte (born 1995) and brother William (born 1999). She and her twin sister are named after Andrew Mountbatten-Windsor's daughters, Princess Eugenie and Princess Beatrice of York. Her sister Charlotte is named after Charlotte Casiraghi, the daughter of Monégasque Princess Caroline and her then husband Stefano Casiraghi, and William is named after William, Prince of Wales.

She once considered a career as a physician. She is fluent in English and French. Her favourite tennis player is Roger Federer, whom she met in 2012 at the Wimbledon Ball. She described talking with Federer as a highlight of her life. Bouchard lives in Miami Beach, Florida, but also owns homes in her hometown of Montreal and Nassau, The Bahamas.

Bouchard is active on the professional pickleball tour and has experienced some success, including a win over world No. 3, Lea Jansen. As of January 2026, she is ranked world No. 9 in women's singles on the PPA Tour.

== Career statistics ==
=== Grand Slam singles performance timelines ===
Key
W	F	SF	QF	#R	RR	Q#	DNQ	A	NH

(W) winner; (F) finalist; (SF) semifinalist; (QF) quarterfinalist; (#R) rounds 4, 3, 2, 1; (RR) round-robin stage; (Q#) qualification round; (DNQ) did not qualify; (A) absent; (NH) not held; (SR) strike rate (events won / competed); (W–L) win–loss record.
To avoid confusion and double counting, these charts are updated at the conclusion of a tournament or when the player's participation has ended.

Tournament	2013	2014	2015	2016	2017	2018	2019	2020	2021	2022	2023	SR	W–L	Win %
Australian Open	Q2	SF	QF	2R	3R	2R	2R	Q3	Q2	A	Q1	0 / 6	14–6	70%
French Open	2R	SF	1R	2R	2R	Q1	1R	3R	A	A	A	0 / 7	10–7	59%
Wimbledon	3R	F	1R	3R	1R	2R	1R	NH	A	A	Q1	0 / 7	11–7	61%
US Open	2R	4R	4R	1R	1R	2R	1R	A	A	Q2	Q2	0 / 7	8–6	57%
Win–Loss	4–3	19–4	7–3	4–4	3–4	3–3	1–4	2–1	0–0	0–0	0–0	0 / 27	43–26	62%

Note: Bouchard's 2015 US Open withdrawal in the fourth round does not count as a loss.

=== Grand Slam tournament finals ===
==== Singles: 1 (runner-up) ====
Result	Year	Tournament	Surface	Opponent	Score
Loss	2014	Wimbledon	Grass	(Czech Republic) Petra Kvitová	3–6, 0–6

== Awards ==
- 2013: WTA Newcomer of the Year
- 2013: Tennis Canada Female Player of the Year
- 2013: Bobbie Rosenfeld Award
- 2014: QMI Agency Canadian Athlete of the Year
- 2014: WTA Most Improved Player
- 2014: Tennis Canada Female Player of the Year
- 2014: Bobbie Rosenfeld Award
- 2015: Tennis Canada Female Player of the Year
- 2016: Tennis Canada Female Player of the Year

== See also ==
- List of Canadian sports personalities

== Notes ==
Awards
Preceded by (United Kingdom) Laura Robson	WTA Newcomer of the Year; 2013	Succeeded by (Switzerland) Belinda Bencic
Preceded by (Romania) Simona Halep	WTA Most Improved Player; 2014	Succeeded by (Switzerland) Timea Bacsinszky
