= 2015 Hopman Cup =

- Date: 4–10 January 2015
- Edition: XXVII
- Surface: Hard (indoor)
- Location: Perth, Western Australia
- Venue: Perth Arena

Champions
- Poland
- Hopman Cup

The Hopman Cup XXVII was the 27th edition of the Hopman Cup tournament between nations in men's and women's tennis. The tournament commenced on 4 January 2015 at the Perth Arena in Perth, Western Australia.

Eight teams competed for the title, with two round robin groups of four, from which the top team of each group advanced to the Final.

France were the 2014 champions. In that tournament's final the French team of Alizé Cornet and Jo-Wilfried Tsonga defeated Poland 2–1, but they failed to defend their title. Agnieszka Radwańska recorded an impressive win over Serena Williams in the final, ultimately carrying the Polish team to their first Hopman Cup title with a 2–1 victory over the United States.

== Entrants ==
=== Seeds ===
On 1 October, the full line-up for the event was announced.

Seed	Team	Female player	WTA^{1}	Male player	ATP^{1}	Total	Elimination
1	United States	Serena Williams	1	John Isner	15	16	Runners-up
2	Italy	Flavia Pennetta	16	Fabio Fognini	18	34	Round-robin
3	Poland	Agnieszka Radwańska	6	Jerzy Janowicz	36	42	Winners
4	Canada	Eugenie Bouchard	7	Vasek Pospisil	41	48	Round-robin
5	Great Britain	Heather Watson	47	Andy Murray	11	58	Round-robin
6	Australia	Casey Dellacqua	26	Marinko Matosevic	76	102	Round-robin
7	France	Alizé Cornet	20	Benoît Paire	97	117	Round-robin
8	Czech Republic	Lucie Šafářová	15	Adam Pavlásek	240	255	Round-robin
^{1} – ATP and WTA rankings as of 29 September 2014 (latest before draw date)

=== Replacement players ===
Pre-tournament replacement
Team	Replacement	Original player	Reason
France	Benoît Paire	Jo-Wilfried Tsonga	Arm injury
United States	John Isner	Jack Sock	Hip surgery
Czech Republic	Adam Pavlásek	Radek Štěpánek	Foot injury
Australia	Matthew Ebden	Nick Kyrgios	Back injury
In-tournament temporary replacement
Australia	Benjamin Mitchell	Matthew Ebden	Calf injury
Italy	Benjamin Mitchell	Fabio Fognini	
In-tournament permanent replacement
Australia	Marinko Matosevic	Matthew Ebden	Calf injury

== Group stage ==
=== Group A ===
All times are local (UTC+8).

==== Standings ====
	Canada	Czech Republic	Italy	United States	RR W–L	Matches W–L	Sets W–L	Games W–L	Standings
Canada		1–2	2–1	2–1	2–1	5–4	11–8	97–84	2
Czech Republic	2–1		3–0	0–3	2–1	5–4	11–9	104–87	3
Italy	1–2	0–3		0–3	0–3	1–8	6–17	88–126	4
United States	1–2	3–0	3–0		2–1	7–2	14–8	115–106	1

==== Canada vs. Czech Republic ====
Canada
1
Perth Arena, Perth
4 January 2015, 10:00
Hard (indoors)

Czech Republic
2

			1	2	3
1	(Canada) (Czech Republic)	Eugenie Bouchard; Lucie Šafářová	0; 6	4; 6
2	(Canada) (Czech Republic)	Vasek Pospisil; Adam Pavlásek	7^{7} 6^{5}	6; 2
3	(Canada) (Czech Republic)	Eugenie Bouchard / Vasek Pospisil; Lucie Šafářová / Adam Pavlásek	4; 6	2; 6

==== Italy vs. United States ====
Italy
0
Perth Arena, Perth
5 January 2015, 10:00
Hard (indoors)

United States
3

			1	2	3
1	(Italy) (United States)	Flavia Pennetta; Serena Williams	6; 0	3; 6	0; 6
2	(Italy) (United States)	Fabio Fognini; John Isner	5; 7	7; 5	6^{4} 7^{7}
3	(Italy) (United States)	Flavia Pennetta / Fabio Fognini; Serena Williams / John Isner	2; 6	6; 2	[9] [11]

==== Czech Republic vs. Italy ====
Czech Republic
3
Perth Arena, Perth
6 January 2015, 10:00
Hard (indoors)

Italy
0

			1	2	3
1	(Czech Republic) (Italy)	Lucie Šafářová; Flavia Pennetta	7; 5	6; 3
2	(Czech Republic) (Italy)	Adam Pavlásek; Fabio Fognini	3; 6	7; 5	6; 1
3	(Czech Republic) (Italy)	Lucie Šafářová / Adam Pavlásek; Flavia Pennetta / Benjamin Mitchell	8; 6

Fabio Fognini was unable to participate in the mixed doubles rubber, Czech was awarded a 6–0, 6–0 win. However, a match was still played in which the score was 8–6 to Czech republic (see above).

==== Canada vs. USA ====
Canada
2
Perth Arena, Perth
6 January 2015, 17:30
Hard (indoors)

United States
1

			1	2	3
1	(Canada) (United States)	Eugenie Bouchard; Serena Williams	6; 2	6; 1
2	(Canada) (United States)	Vasek Pospisil; John Isner	6; 3	7^{7} 6^{4}
3	(Canada) (United States)	Eugenie Bouchard / Vasek Pospisil; Serena Williams / John Isner	3; 6	5; 7

==== Canada vs. Italy ====
Canada
2
Perth Arena, Perth
8 January 2015, 10:00
Hard (indoors)

Italy
1

			1	2	3
1	(Canada) (Italy)	Eugenie Bouchard; Flavia Pennetta	6; 3	6; 4
2	(Canada) (Italy)	Vasek Pospisil; Fabio Fognini	6; 0	6; 3
3	(Canada) (Italy)	Eugenie Bouchard / Vasek Pospisil; Flavia Pennetta / Fabio Fognini	3; 6	6; 4	[7] [10]

==== Czech Republic vs. USA ====
Czech Republic
0
Perth Arena, Perth
8 January 2015, 17:30
Hard (indoors)

United States
3

			1	2	3
1	(Czech Republic) (United States)	Lucie Šafářová; Serena Williams	3; 6	7^{7} 6^{1}	6^{6} 7^{8}
2	(Czech Republic) (United States)	Adam Pavlásek; John Isner	6^{4} 7^{7}	4; 6
3	(Czech Republic) (United States)	Lucie Šafářová / Adam Pavlásek; Serena Williams / John Isner	3; 6	3; 6

=== Group B ===
All times are local (UTC+8).

==== Standings ====
	Australia	France	Great Britain	Poland	RR	Matches	Sets	Games	Standings
Australia		1–2	0–3	0–3	0–3	1–8	4–17	71–120	4
France	2–1		1–2	2–1	2–1	5–4	12–11	120–109	3
Great Britain	3–0	2–1		1–2	2–1	6–3	12–7	93-83	2
Poland	3–0	1-2	2–1		2–1	6–3	14–7	110–82	1

==== Australia vs. Poland ====
Australia
0
Perth Arena, Perth
4 January 2015, 17:30
Hard (indoors)

Poland
3

			1	2	3
1	(Australia) (Poland)	Casey Dellacqua; Agnieszka Radwańska	2; 6	3; 6
2	(Australia) (Poland)	Matthew Ebden; Jerzy Janowicz	6; 3	5; 7	0; 6
3	(Australia) (Poland)	Casey Dellacqua / Benjamin Mitchell; Agnieszka Radwańska / Jerzy Janowicz	6; 8

Matthew Ebden was unable to participate in the mixed doubles rubber, Poland was awarded a 6–0, 6–0 win. However a match was still played in which the score was 8–6 to Poland (see above).

==== Great Britain vs. France ====
Great Britain
2
Perth Arena, Perth
5 January 2015, 17:30
Hard (indoors)

France
1

			1	2	3
1	(United Kingdom) (France)	Heather Watson; Alizé Cornet	2; 6	2; 6
2	(United Kingdom) (France)	Andy Murray; Benoît Paire	6; 2	7; 5
3	(United Kingdom) (France)	Heather Watson / Andy Murray; Alizé Cornet / Benoît Paire	6; 4	2; 6	10; 8

==== Great Britain vs. Poland ====
Great Britain
1
Perth Arena, Perth
7 January 2015, 10:00
Hard (indoors)

Poland
2

			1	2	3
1	(United Kingdom) (Poland)	Heather Watson; Agnieszka Radwańska	3; 6	1; 6
2	(United Kingdom) (Poland)	Andy Murray; Jerzy Janowicz	6; 2	6; 4
3	(United Kingdom) (Poland)	Heather Watson / Andy Murray; Agnieszka Radwańska / Jerzy Janowicz	4; 6	4; 6

==== Australia vs. France ====
Australia
1
Perth Arena, Perth
7 January 2015, 17:30
Hard (indoors)

France
2

			1	2	3
1	(Australia) (France)	Casey Dellacqua; Alizé Cornet	6; 4	5; 7	1; 6
2	(Australia) (France)	Marinko Matosevic; Benoît Paire	2; 6	6; 4	6; 2
3	(Australia) (France)	Casey Dellacqua / Marinko Matosevic; Alizé Cornet / Benoît Paire	6^{3} 7^{7}	5; 7

==== France vs. Poland ====
France
2
Perth Arena, Perth
9 January 2015, 10:00
Hard (indoors)

Poland
1

			1	2	3
1	(France) (Poland)	Alizé Cornet; Agnieszka Radwańska	6; 4	2; 6	7; 5
2	(France) (Poland)	Benoît Paire; Jerzy Janowicz	4; 6	6^{6} 7^{8}
3	(France) (Poland)	Alizé Cornet / Benoît Paire; Agnieszka Radwańska / Jerzy Janowicz	4; 6	0; 0		retired

Since Poland had already won the group and clinched a berth in the Final with their win in the men's singles match, the mixed doubles rubber comprised just a single tiebreak set by agreement between the teams (see above). Poland retired after first set.

==== Australia vs. Great Britain ====
Australia
0
Perth Arena, Perth
9 January 2015, 17:30
Hard (indoors)

Great Britain
3

			1	2	3
1	(Australia) (United Kingdom)	Casey Dellacqua; Heather Watson	3; 6	4; 6
2	(Australia) (United Kingdom)	Marinko Matosevic; Andy Murray	3; 6	2; 6
3	(Australia) (United Kingdom)	Casey Dellacqua / Marinko Matosevic; Heather Watson / Andy Murray	5; 7	1; 6

== Final ==
=== United States vs. Poland ===
United States
1
Perth Arena, Perth
10 January 2015, 15:30
Hard (indoors)

Poland
2

			1	2	3
1	(United States) (Poland)	Serena Williams; Agnieszka Radwańska	4; 6	7^{7} 6^{3}	1; 6
2	(United States) (Poland)	John Isner; Jerzy Janowicz	7^{12} 6^{10}	6; 4
3	(United States) (Poland)	Serena Williams / John Isner; Agnieszka Radwańska / Jerzy Janowicz	5; 7	3; 6

2015 Hopman Cup Champions
(Poland)
Poland
First title
