= 2014 Hopman Cup =

- Date: 28 December 2013 – 4 January 2014
- Edition: XXVI
- Surface: Hard (indoor)
- Location: Perth, Western Australia
- Venue: Perth Arena

Champions
- France
- Hopman Cup

The Hopman Cup XXVI (also known as the Hyundai Hopman Cup for sponsorship reasons) corresponded to the 26th edition of the Hopman Cup tournament between nations in men's and women's tennis. The tournament commenced on 28 December 2013 at the Perth Arena in Perth, Western Australia.

Eight teams competed for the title, with two round robin groups of four, from which the top team of each group progress to the final.

Spain were the 2013 champions. In that tournament's final the Spain team of Anabel Medina Garrigues and Fernando Verdasco defeated Serbia's Ana Ivanovic and Novak Djokovic 2–1. This was Spain's fourth Hopman Cup title. They returned to defend their title, however, in 2014, Medina Garrigues was paired with Daniel Muñoz de la Nava—a replacement for the injured Tommy Robredo—and the nation failed to defend their title, finishing at the bottom of Group B.

On 17 July, France were the first team to confirm their entry into this year's edition; and were to be originally represented by Marion Bartoli and former Australian Open finalist Jo-Wilfried Tsonga; however, with Bartoli retiring in August, it was announced in October that Tsonga will instead pair with Alizé Cornet. After two previous runner-up showings, the nation won its first Hopman Cup title by defeating top seeds Poland in the final by two rubbers to one.

== Tournament ==
The 2014 Hyundai Hopman Cup was an invitational tennis tournament and was also known as the Official Mixed Teams Championships of the ITF. The 2014 cup had prize money of $1 million and followed the traditional round robin format, the leading teams after three round robin matches qualify for the final. All matches were best of three sets with the exception of the doubles match where a match tie break, first to ten points, is played if the match is tied at one set all. All ties were played in this format; women's singles, men's singles and finally mixed doubles. In the event of a tie in the final group standings the following were used to separate the nations;

- The highest total of matches won
- Best percentage of sets won and lost
- Best percentage of games won and lost
- Head-to-head performances
- Toss of a coin

== Entrants ==
=== Seeds ===
The seeds for the 2014 Hopman Cup were decided by tournament director Steve Ayles, Paul Kilderry, Kim Hames and Terry Waldron.

Seed	Team	Female player	Male player
1	Poland	Agnieszka Radwańska	Grzegorz Panfil
2	United States	Sloane Stephens	John Isner
3	France	Alizé Cornet	Jo-Wilfried Tsonga
4	Canada	Eugenie Bouchard	Milos Raonic
5	Czech Republic	Petra Kvitová	Radek Štěpánek
6	Italy	Flavia Pennetta	Andreas Seppi
7	Australia	Samantha Stosur	Bernard Tomic
8	Spain	Anabel Medina Garrigues	Daniel Muñoz de la Nava

=== Replacement players ===
pre-tournament

Team	Replacement	Original player	Reason
France	Alizé Cornet	Marion Bartoli	Retirement from tennis
Poland	Grzegorz Panfil	Jerzy Janowicz	Metatarsus injury
Spain	Daniel Muñoz de la Nava	Tommy Robredo	Right arm injury

in-tournament temporary replacements

Team	Replacement	Original player	Reason
Italy	(Australia) Oliver Anderson	Andreas Seppi	Illness
Italy	(Australia) Bojana Bobusic	Flavia Pennetta	Wrist injury
United States	(Canada) Milos Raonic	John Isner	Leg injury
United States	(Australia) Bojana Bobusic (Australia) Oliver Anderson	Sloane Stephens; John Isner	Wrist injury Leg injury

== Group stage ==
=== Group A ===
All times are local (UTC+8).

==== Standings ====
Pos.	Country	W	L	Matches	Sets	Games
1	Poland	3	0	7–2	15–7	106–79
2	Canada	2	1	6–3	13–8	104–77
3	Italy	1	2	2–7	5–14	51–103
4	Australia	0	3	3–6	9–13	97–99

==== Poland vs. Italy ====
Poland
3
Perth Arena, Perth
28 December 2013, 10:00
Hard (indoors)

Italy
0

			1	2	3
1	(Poland) (Italy)	Agnieszka Radwańska; Flavia Pennetta	6; 2	6; 2
2	(Poland) (Italy)	Grzegorz Panfil; Andreas Seppi	6; 4	2; 2		retired
3	(Poland) (Italy)	Agnieszka Radwańska / Grzegorz Panfil; Flavia Pennetta / Oliver Anderson	6; 2	6; 1

The mixed doubles match was played with Australian junior Oliver Anderson playing for Seppi.

==== Canada vs. Australia ====
Canada
2
Perth Arena, Perth
28 December 2013, 17:30
Hard (indoors)

Australia
1

			1	2	3
1	(Canada) (Australia)	Milos Raonic; Bernard Tomic	7^{8} 6^{6}	6; 1
2	(Canada) (Australia)	Eugenie Bouchard; Samantha Stosur	4; 6	6; 2	6; 3
3	(Canada) (Australia)	Eugenie Bouchard / Milos Raonic; Samantha Stosur / Bernard Tomic	2; 6	4; 6

==== Poland vs. Canada ====
Poland
2
Perth Arena, Perth
29 December 2013, 17:30
Hard (indoors)

Canada
1

			1	2	3
1	(Poland) (Canada)	Agnieszka Radwańska; Eugenie Bouchard	6; 3	6^{7} 7^{9}	6; 2
2	(Poland) (Canada)	Grzegorz Panfil; Milos Raonic	7^{7} 6^{1}	6; 3
3	(Poland) (Canada)	Agnieszka Radwańska / Grzegorz Panfil; Eugenie Bouchard / Milos Raonic	3; 6	7; 5	3; 10

==== Italy vs. Australia ====
Italy
2
Perth Arena, Perth
31 December 2013, 10:00
Hard (indoors)

Australia
1

			1	2	3
1	(Italy) (Australia)	Flavia Pennetta; Samantha Stosur	6; 4	6; 4
2	(Italy) (Australia)	Andreas Seppi; Bernard Tomic	6; 4	3; 6	2; 6
3	(Italy) (Australia)	Flavia Pennetta / Andreas Seppi; Samantha Stosur / Bernard Tomic	6; 3	6; 4

==== Italy vs. Canada ====
Italy
0
Perth Arena, Perth
2 January 2014, 10:00
Hard (indoors)

Canada
3

			1	2	3
1	(Italy) (Canada)	Flavia Pennetta; Eugenie Bouchard	0; 4			retired
2	(Italy) (Canada)	Andreas Seppi; Milos Raonic	2; 6	4; 6
3	(Italy) (Canada)	Bojana Bobusic / Andreas Seppi; Eugenie Bouchard / Milos Raonic	1; 6	4; 6

The mixed doubles match was played with Australian Bojana Bobusic playing for Flavia Pennetta.

==== Poland vs. Australia ====
Poland
2
Perth Arena, Perth
2 January 2014, 17:30
Hard (indoors)

Australia
1

			1	2	3
1	(Poland) (Australia)	Agnieszka Radwańska; Samantha Stosur	3; 6	6; 4	6; 3
2	(Poland) (Australia)	Grzegorz Panfil; Bernard Tomic	1; 6	4; 6
3	(Poland) (Australia)	Agnieszka Radwańska / Grzegorz Panfil; Samantha Stosur / Bernard Tomic	1; 6	7; 5	10; 8

=== Group B ===
All times are local (UTC+8).

==== Standings ====
Pos.	Country	W	L	Matches	Sets	Games
1	France	3	0	7–2	15–6	114–78
2	Czech Republic	2	1	7–2	14–5	97–48
3	United States	1	2	4–5	9–11	72–95
4	Spain	0	3	0–9	2–18	52–119

==== Czech Republic vs. Spain ====
Czech Republic
3
Perth Arena, Perth
29 December 2013, 10:00
Hard (indoors)

Spain
0

			1	2	3
1	(Czech Republic) (Spain)	Petra Kvitová; Anabel Medina Garrigues	6; 1	6; 0
2	(Czech Republic) (Spain)	Radek Štěpánek; Daniel Muñoz de la Nava	6; 2	6; 2
3	(Czech Republic) (Spain)	Petra Kvitová / Radek Štěpánek; Anabel Medina Garrigues / Daniel Muñoz de la Nava	6; 3	6; 4

==== United States vs. Spain ====
United States
3
Perth Arena, Perth
30 December 2013, 10:00
Hard (indoors)

Spain
0

			1	2	3
1	(United States) (Spain)	Sloane Stephens; Anabel Medina Garrigues	6; 3	6; 1
2	(United States) (Spain)	John Isner; Daniel Muñoz de la Nava	6; 3	6; 4
3	(United States) (Spain)	Sloane Stephens / John Isner; Anabel Medina Garrigues / Daniel Muñoz de la Nava	4; 6	6; 0	10; 4

==== France vs. Czech Republic ====
France
2
Perth Arena, Perth
30 December 2013, 17:30
Hard (indoors)

Czech Republic
1

			1	2	3
1	(France) (Czech Republic)	Jo-Wilfried Tsonga; Radek Štěpánek	6; 1	6; 4
2	(France) (Czech Republic)	Alizé Cornet; Petra Kvitová	1; 6	6; 3	5; 7
3	(France) (Czech Republic)	Alizé Cornet / Jo-Wilfried Tsonga; Petra Kvitová / Radek Štěpánek	6; 1	6; 3

==== United States vs. France ====
United States
1
Perth Arena, Perth
1 January 2014, 17:30
Hard (indoors)

France
2

			1	2	3
1	(United States) (France)	Sloane Stephens; Alizé Cornet	7; 5	6; 0
2	(United States) (France)	John Isner; Jo-Wilfried Tsonga	6^{1} 7^{7}	3; 6
3	(United States) (France)	Sloane Stephens / John Isner; Alizé Cornet / Jo-Wilfried Tsonga	1; 6	7; 5	5; 10

==== France vs. Spain ====
France
3
Perth Arena, Perth
3 January 2014, 10:00
Hard (indoors)

Spain
0

			1	2	3
1	(France) (Spain)	Alizé Cornet; Anabel Medina Garrigues	6; 2	6; 2
2	(France) (Spain)	Jo-Wilfried Tsonga; Daniel Muñoz de la Nava	6; 4	6^{7} 7^{9}	6; 2
3	(France) (Spain)	Alizé Cornet / Jo-Wilfried Tsonga; Anabel Medina Garrigues / Daniel Muñoz de la Nava	8; 3

==== Czech Republic vs. United States ====
Czech Republic
3
Perth Arena, Perth
3 January 2014, 17:30
Hard (indoors)

United States
0

			1	2	3
1	(Czech Republic) (United States)	Petra Kvitová; Sloane Stephens	6; 3			retired
2	(Czech Republic) (United States)	Radek Štěpánek; Milos Raonic	5; 7	6; 3	7^{7} 6^{4}
3	(Czech Republic) (United States)	Petra Kvitová / Radek Štěpánek; Bojana Bobusic / Oliver Anderson	8; 3

The Men's Singles match was played with Canadian Milos Raonic playing for John Isner.
The Mixed Doubles match was played with Australian's Bobusic & Anderson playing for Stephens & Isner.

== Final ==
Poland
1
Perth Arena, Perth
4 January 2014, 17:30
Hard (indoors)

France
2

			1	2	3
1	(Poland) (France)	Grzegorz Panfil; Jo-Wilfried Tsonga	3; 6	6; 3	3; 6
2	(Poland) (France)	Agnieszka Radwańska; Alizé Cornet	6; 3	6^{7} 7^{9}	6; 2
3	(Poland) (France)	Agnieszka Radwańska / Grzegorz Panfil; Alizé Cornet / Jo-Wilfried Tsonga	0; 6	2; 6

2014 Hopman Cup Champions
(France)
France
First title
