= Poland at the Hopman Cup =

Sporting event delegation

Poland
- First year: 2014
- Years played: 2
- Hopman Cup titles: 1 (2015)
- Runners-up: 1 (2014)
- Most total wins: Agnieszka Radwańska (13–3)
- Most singles wins: Agnieszka Radwańska (7–1)
- Most doubles wins: Agnieszka Radwańska (6–2); Jerzy Janowicz (4–0)
- Best doubles team: Agnieszka Radwańska & Jerzy Janowicz (4–0)
- Most years played: Agnieszka Radwańska (2)

Poland is a nation that has competed at the Hopman Cup tournament on two occasions, in 2014 and 2015. The nation reached the final in its inaugural appearance, but lost to France by two rubbers to one. However, it did win the 2015 tournament, defeating the United States by 2–1 in that year's final.

== Players ==
This is a list of players who have played for Poland in the Hopman Cup.

Name	Total W–L	Singles W–L	Doubles W–L	First year played	No. of years played
Jerzy Janowicz	6–2	2–2	4–0	2015	1
Grzegorz Panfil	4–4	2–2	2–2	2014	1
Agnieszka Radwańska	13–3	7–1	6–2	2014	2

== Results ==
Year	Competition	Location	Opponent	Score	Result
2014	Round Robin	Perth Arena	Italy	3–0	Won
2014	Round Robin	Perth Arena	Canada	2–1	Won
2014	Round Robin	Perth Arena	Australia	2–1	Won
2014	Final	Perth Arena	France	1–2	Lost
2015	Round Robin	Perth Arena	Australia	3–0	Won
2015	Round Robin	Perth Arena	Great Britain	2–1	Won
2015	Round Robin	Perth Arena	France	1–2	Lost
2015	Final	Perth Arena	United States	2–1	Won
