= France at the Hopman Cup =

Sporting event delegation

France
- First year: 1989
- Years played: 26
- Hopman Cup titles: 2 (2014, 2017)
- Runners-up: 2 (1998, 2012)
- Most total wins: Richard Gasquet (17–5)
- Most singles wins: Richard Gasquet (8–4)
- Most doubles wins: Alizé Cornet (10–4)
- Best doubles team: Alizé Cornet & Jo-Wilfried Tsonga (4–0)
- Most years played: Alizé Cornet (5)

France is a nation that has competed at twenty-six Hopman Cup tournaments and first competed in the inaugural Hopman Cup in 1989. Their best results to date came in 2014, when they defeated Poland in the final by two rubbers to one, and in 2017 when they defeated the United States in the final, also by two rubbers to one.

== Players ==
This is a list of players who have played for France in the Hopman Cup.

Name	Total W–L	Singles W–L	Doubles W–L	First year played	No. of years played
Marion Bartoli	4–2	2–2	2–0	2012	1
Arnaud Boetsch	3–3	2–1	1–2	1996	1
Arnaud Clément	2–3	1–2	1–1	2002	1
Alizé Cornet	16–13	6–9	10–4	2009	5
Isabelle Demongeot	1–3	1–1	0–2	1990	1
Kenny de Schepper	0–6	0–3	0–3	2016	1
Jean-Philippe Fleurian	5–1	2–1	3–0	1995	1
Guy Forget	9–6	6–2	3–4	1991	3
Caroline Garcia	3–3	3–0	0–3	2016	1
Richard Gasquet	17–5	8–4	9–1	2012	4
Tatiana Golovin	2–2	2–1	0–1	2007	1
Jérôme Haehnel	2–2	2–1	0–1	2007	1
Julie Halard	5–4	2–3	3–1	1992	2
Mathilde Johansson	0–6	0–3	0–3	2013	1
Henri Leconte	1–2	1–1	0–1	1992	1
Nicolas Mahut	2–3	1–2	1–1	2011	1
Amélie Mauresmo	4–2	2–1	2–1	2004	1
Kristina Mladenovic	10–4	4–3	6–1	2011	2
Yannick Noah	1–3	1–1	0–2	1990	1
Benoît Paire	2–4	0–3	2–1	2015	1
Chloé Paquet	2–2	0–2	2–0	2025	1
Pascale Paradis	0–2	0–1	0–1	1989	1
Mary Pierce	8–5	5–2	3–3	1997	2
Cédric Pioline	6–4	3–2	3–2	1994	2
Lucas Pouille	2−3	0−3	2−0	2019	1
Guillaume Raoux	5–3	2–2	3–1	1999	1
Virginie Razzano	1–4	0–3	1–1	2002	1
Fabrice Santoro	2–4	0–3	2–1	2004	1
Catherine Tanvier	3–9	1–5	2–4	1991	2
Nathalie Tauziat	4–4	1–3	3–1	1993	2
Sandrine Testud	5–3	2–2	3–1	1999	1
Jo-Wilfried Tsonga	11–3	7–0	4–3	2013	2
Thierry Tulasne	0–2	0–1	0–1	1989	1

== Results ==
Year	Competition	Location	Opponent	Score	Result
1989	Round One	Burswood Dome, Perth	Germany	0–3	Lost
1990	Round One	Burswood Dome, Perth	Netherlands	2–1	Won
1990	Quarterfinals	Burswood Dome, Perth	Czechoslovakia	0–3	Lost
1991	Round One	Burswood Dome, Perth	Netherlands	2–1	Won
1991	Quarterfinals	Burswood Dome, Perth	Spain	2–1	Won
1991	Semifinals	Burswood Dome, Perth	Yugoslavia	1–2	Lost
1992 ^{1}	Round One	Burswood Dome, Perth	Sweden	2–1	Won
1992 ^{1}	Quarterfinals	Burswood Dome, Perth	Germany	1–2	Lost
1993 ^{2}	Round One	Burswood Dome, Perth	Israel	3–0	Won
1993 ^{2}	Quarterfinals	Burswood Dome, Perth	United States	2–1	Won
1993 ^{2}	Semifinals	Burswood Dome, Perth	Germany	1–2	Lost
1994	Quarterfinals	Burswood Dome, Perth	Australia	0–3	Lost
1995	Round One	Burswood Dome, Perth	Netherlands	2–1	Won
1995	Quarterfinals	Burswood Dome, Perth	Spain	3–0	Won
1995	Semifinals	Burswood Dome, Perth	Germany	1–2	Lost
1996	Round Robin	Burswood Dome, Perth	Croatia	0–3	Lost
1996	Round Robin	Burswood Dome, Perth	South Africa	2–1	Won
1996	Round Robin	Burswood Dome, Perth	United States	1–2	Lost
1997 ^{3}	Round Robin	Burswood Dome, Perth	United States	1–2	Lost
1997 ^{3}	Round Robin	Burswood Dome, Perth	Australia	1–2	Lost
1997 ^{3}	Round Robin	Burswood Dome, Perth	Croatia	0–3	Lost
1998	Round Robin	Burswood Dome, Perth	Germany	3–0	Won
1998	Round Robin	Burswood Dome, Perth	United States	3–0	Won
1998	Round Robin	Burswood Dome, Perth	South Africa	3–0	Won
1998	Final	Burswood Dome, Perth	Slovakia	1–2	Lost
1999	Qualification Play-Off	Burswood Dome, Perth	Zimbabwe	2–1	Won
1999	Round Robin	Burswood Dome, Perth	Spain	2–1	Won
1999	Round Robin	Burswood Dome, Perth	South Africa	2–1	Won
1999	Round Robin	Burswood Dome, Perth	Australia	1–2	Lost
2002 ^{4}	Round Robin	Burswood Dome, Perth	United States	0–3	Lost
2002 ^{4}	Round Robin	Burswood Dome, Perth	Belgium	1–2	Lost
2002 ^{4}	Round Robin	Burswood Dome, Perth	Italy	1–2	Lost
2004	Round Robin	Burswood Dome, Perth	Russia	2–1	Won
2004	Round Robin	Burswood Dome, Perth	United States	0–3	Lost
2004	Round Robin	Burswood Dome, Perth	Czech Republic	2–1	Won
2007	Round Robin	Burswood Dome, Perth	United States	2–1	Won
2007	Round Robin	Burswood Dome, Perth	Australia	3–0	Won
2007	Round Robin	Burswood Dome, Perth	Russia	0–3	Lost
2011	Round Robin	Burswood Dome, Perth	United States	0–3	Lost
2011	Round Robin	Burswood Dome, Perth	Great Britain	2–1	Won
2011	Round Robin	Burswood Dome, Perth	Italy	3–0	Won
2012 ^{5}	Round Robin	Burswood Dome, Perth	China	2–1	Won
2012 ^{5}	Round Robin	Burswood Dome, Perth	Australia	3–0	Won
2012 ^{5}	Round Robin	Burswood Dome, Perth	Spain	2–0	Won
2012 ^{5}	Final	Burswood Dome, Perth	Czech Republic	0–2	Lost
2013	Round Robin	Perth Arena, Perth	Spain	1–2	Lost
2013	Round Robin	Perth Arena, Perth	United States	1–2	Lost
2013	Round Robin	Perth Arena, Perth	South Africa	1–2	Lost
2014	Round Robin	Perth Arena, Perth	Czech Republic	2–1	Won
2014	Round Robin	Perth Arena, Perth	United States	2–1	Won
2014	Round Robin	Perth Arena, Perth	Spain	3–0	Won
2014	Final	Perth Arena, Perth	Poland	2–1	Won
2015	Round Robin	Perth Arena, Perth	Great Britain	1–2	Lost
2015	Round Robin	Perth Arena, Perth	Australia	2–1	Won
2015	Round Robin	Perth Arena, Perth	Poland	2–1	Won
2016	Round Robin	Perth Arena, Perth	Great Britain	1–2	Lost
2016	Round Robin	Perth Arena, Perth	Germany	1–2	Lost
2016	Round Robin	Perth Arena, Perth	Australia	1–2	Lost
2017	Round Robin	Perth Arena, Perth	Germany	2–1	Won
2017	Round Robin	Perth Arena, Perth	Great Britain	3–0	Won
2017	Round Robin	Perth Arena, Perth	Switzerland	2–1	Won
2017	Final	Perth Arena, Perth	United States	2–1	Won
2019	Round Robin	Perth Arena, Perth	Germany	1–2	Lost
2019	Round Robin	Perth Arena, Perth	Australia	1–2	Lost
2019	Round Robin	Perth Arena, Perth	Spain	1–2	Lost
2023	Round Robin	Nice Lawn Tennis Club, Nice	Denmark	2–1	Won
2023	Round Robin	Nice Lawn Tennis Club, Nice	Switzerland	1–2	Lost
2025 ^{6}	Round Robin	Fiera del Levante, Bari	Croatia	2–1	Won
2025 ^{6}	Round Robin	Fiera del Levante, Bari	Italy	1–2	Lost

^{1} Having already won both singles matches and thus the tie, Germany decided not to compete in the final mixed doubles dead rubber against France, therefore conceding the point to France.
^{2} In 1993, the French team was forced to retire at 4–2 down in the mixed doubles, thus conceding the point to Germany and losing the tie.
^{3} In the final tie against Croatia in 1997, Guy Forget was unable to compete in either the men's singles or mixed doubles matches. Both points were therefore conceded to the Croatian team.
^{4} In their final round robin tie against Italy, France automatically conceded two points due to Virginie Razzano being forced to retire in her singles match and also being unable to compete in the mixed doubles.
^{5} In the 2012 ties against Spain and the Czech Republic the dead mixed doubles rubbers was not played.
^{6} In the first round robin tie against Croatia, opponent Donna Vekić withdrew from the mixed doubles match, thus conceding the point and the tie to France.
