= Hungary at the Hopman Cup =

Sporting event delegation

Hungary
- First year: 2004
- Years played: 1
- Best finish: Qualified and finished 3rd in group
- Most total wins: Petra Mandula (4–3)
- Most singles wins: Petra Mandula (3–1)
- Most doubles wins: Petra Mandula (1–2); Attila Sávolt (1–2)
- Best doubles team: Petra Mandula & Attila Sávolt (1–2)
- Most years played: Petra Mandula (1); Attila Sávolt (1)

Hungary is a nation that has competed at the Hopman Cup tournament on one occasion, in 2004, when they defeated Canada in the qualification play-off to reach the round robin stage of the tournament where they finished 3rd in their group.

== Players ==
This is a list of players who have played for Hungary in the Hopman Cup.

Name	Total W–L	Singles W–L	Doubles W–L	First year played	No. of years played
Petra Mandula	4–3	3–1	1–2	2004	1
Attila Sávolt	2–5	1–3	1–2	2004	1

== Results ==
Year	Competition	Location	Opponent	Score	Result
2004 ^{1}	Qualification Play-offs	Burswood Dome, Perth	Canada	2–1	Won
2004 ^{1}	Round Robin	Burswood Dome, Perth	Australia	0–3	Lost
2004 ^{1}	Round Robin	Burswood Dome, Perth	Slovakia	1–2	Lost
2004 ^{1}	Round Robin	Burswood Dome, Perth	Canada	3–0	Won

^{1} Although Hungary defeated Canada in the qualification play-off, the two teams faced each other for a second time in 2004 when Canada replaced the injured Belgian team for the final round robin tie.
