= Canada at the Hopman Cup =

Canadian involvement in the Hopman Cup tennis tournament

Canada
- First year: 2004
- Years played: 5
- Hopman Cup titles: 1 (2025)
- Most total wins: Eugenie Bouchard (7–10)
- Most singles wins: Eugenie Bouchard (4–5)
- Most doubles wins: Bianca Andreescu (3–0); Félix Auger-Aliassime (3–0); Eugenie Bouchard (3–5)
- Best doubles team: Bianca Andreescu / Félix Auger-Aliassime (3–0)
- Most years played: Eugenie Bouchard (3)

Canada has competed at the Hopman Cup tennis tournament on five occasions, in 2004, 2014, 2015, 2018 and 2025. In 2004, the team of Maureen Drake and Frank Dancevic was defeated in the qualification play-off and as such did not compete in the round robin, except to stand in for the injured Belgium team for the final round robin tie against Hungary. Milos Raonic and Eugenie Bouchard represented Canada in 2014 and finished second in Group A. Bouchard represented Canada once again in 2015, this time with Vasek Pospisil, and ranked second in Group A for the second straight year. Bouchard and Pospisil represented Canada in 2018 and finished last in their group. Bianca Andreescu and Félix Auger-Aliassime represented Canada in 2025, leading Canada to its first ever Hopman Cup title.

== Players ==
This is a list of players who have played for Canada in the Hopman Cup.

Name	Total W/L	Singles W/L	Doubles W/L	First year played	No. of years played
Bianca Andreescu	6–0	3–0	3–0	2025	1
Félix Auger-Aliassime	5–1	2–1	3–0	2025	1
Eugenie Bouchard	7–10	4–5	3–5	2014	3
Frank Dancevic	1–2	1–1	0–1	2004	1
Maureen Drake	0–3	0–2	0–1	2004	1
Vasek Pospisil	5–7	3–3	2–4	2015	2
Milos Raonic	4–2	2–1	2–1	2014	1

== Results ==
Year	Competition	Location	Opponent	Score	Result
2004^{1}	Qualification play-offs	Burswood Dome, Perth	Hungary	1–2	Loss
2004^{1}	Round Robin	Burswood Dome, Perth	Hungary	0–3	Loss
2014	Round Robin	Perth Arena, Perth	Australia	2–1	Win
2014	Round Robin	Perth Arena, Perth	Poland	1–2	Loss
2014	Round Robin	Perth Arena, Perth	Italy	3–0	Win
2015	Round Robin	Perth Arena, Perth	Czech Republic	1–2	Loss
2015	Round Robin	Perth Arena, Perth	United States	2–1	Win
2015	Round Robin	Perth Arena, Perth	Italy	2–1	Win
2018	Round Robin	Perth Arena, Perth	Australia	1–2	Loss
2018	Round Robin	Perth Arena, Perth	Germany	0–3	Loss
2018	Round Robin	Perth Arena, Perth	Belgium	0–3	Loss
2025	Round Robin	Fiera del Levante, Bari	Spain	3–0	Win
2025	Round Robin	Fiera del Levante, Bari	Greece	3–0	Win
2025	Final	Fiera del Levante, Bari	Italy	2–1	Win

^{1} Despite losing the qualification play-off against Hungary in 2004, Canada replaced the injured Belgium team for their final round robin tie (again against the Hungarian team) where they conceded the mixed doubles dead rubber as a walkover.
