= 2017 Hopman Cup =

- Date: 1–7 January 2017
- Edition: XXIX (29th)
- Surface: Hard (indoor)
- Location: Perth, Western Australia
- Venue: Perth Arena

Champions
- France
← 2016 ·	Hopman Cup	· 2018 →

The Hopman Cup XXIX (also known as the 2017 Mastercard Hopman Cup for sponsorship reasons) was the 29th edition of the Hopman Cup tournament between nations in men's and women's tennis. It took place at the Perth Arena in Perth, Western Australia.

The defending champions were Australia. Roger Federer, 2001 champion, made his first appearance since 2002, alongside his partner Belinda Bencic.

For this edition, the Fast4 rule was implemented in Mixed Doubles matches. This marked the first time that an official tournament applied this rule since its inception in 2015.

In the final France defeated the US to win its second title.

== Entrants ==
=== Seeds ===
The draw took place on 6 October 2016 and it placed the 8 teams into two groups, according to the following ranking-based seedings:

Seed	Team	Female player	WTA^{1}	Male player	ATP^{1}	Total	Elimination
1	Switzerland	Belinda Bencic	43	Roger Federer	7	50	Round robin
2	Australia	Daria Gavrilova	49	Nick Kyrgios	15	64	Round robin
3	United States	CoCo Vandeweghe	40	Jack Sock	25	65	Runners-up
4	Germany	Andrea Petkovic	44	Alexander Zverev	24	68	Round robin
5	France	Kristina Mladenovic	57	Richard Gasquet	17	74	Champions
6	Spain	Lara Arruabarrena	61	Feliciano López	28	89	Round robin
7	Great Britain	Heather Watson	76	Daniel Evans	56	132	Round robin
8	Czech Republic	Lucie Hradecká	196	Adam Pavlásek	85	281	Round robin
^{1} – ATP and WTA rankings as of 3 October 2016 (latest before draw date)

=== Replacement players ===
Pre-tournament replacement
Team	Replacement	Original player	Reason
Czech Republic	Lucie Hradecká	Petra Kvitová	Foot injury
In-tournament partial replacement
Australia	Matthew Ebden	Nick Kyrgios	Minor knee complaint

== Group stage ==
=== Group A ===
All times are local (UTC+8).

==== Standings ====
		France	Germany	Great Britain (United Kingdom)	Switzerland	RR W–L	Matches W–L	Sets W–L	Games W–L	Standings
2	Switzerland	1–2	2–1	3–0		2–1	6–3	14–7	104–78	2
4	France		2–1	3–0	2–1	3–0	7–2	14–6	88–78	1
5	Germany	1–2		2–1	1–2	1–2	4–5	8–11	81–87	3
7	Great Britain	0–3	1–2		0–3	0–3	1–8	4–16	71–91	4

==== France vs. Germany ====
France
2
Perth Arena, Perth
2 January 2017, 10:00
Hard (i)

Germany
1

			1	2	3
1	(France) (Germany)	Kristina Mladenovic; Andrea Petkovic	2; 6	1; 6
2	(France) (Germany)	Richard Gasquet; Alexander Zverev	7; 5	6; 3
3	(France) (Germany)	Kristina Mladenovic / Richard Gasquet; Andrea Petkovic / Alexander Zverev	4; 2	4; 1

==== Switzerland vs. Great Britain ====
Switzerland
3
Perth Arena, Perth
2 January 2017, 17:30
Hard (i)

Great Britain
0

			1	2	3
1	(Switzerland) (United Kingdom)	Roger Federer; Daniel Evans	6; 3	6; 4
2	(Switzerland) (United Kingdom)	Belinda Bencic; Heather Watson	7; 5	3; 6	6; 2
3	(Switzerland) (United Kingdom)	Belinda Bencic / Roger Federer; Heather Watson / Daniel Evans	4; 0	4; 1

==== France vs. Great Britain ====
France
3
Perth Arena, Perth
4 January 2017, 10:00
Hard (i)

Great Britain
0

			1	2	3
1	(France) (United Kingdom)	Kristina Mladenovic; Heather Watson	6; 4	5; 7	6; 3
2	(France) (United Kingdom)	Richard Gasquet; Daniel Evans	6; 4	6; 2
3	(France) (United Kingdom)	Kristina Mladenovic / Richard Gasquet; Heather Watson / Daniel Evans	4^{5} 3^{4}	4^{5} 3^{2}

==== Switzerland vs. Germany ====
Switzerland
2
Perth Arena, Perth
4 January 2017, 17:30
Hard (i)

Germany
1

			1	2	3
1	(Switzerland) (Germany)	Roger Federer; Alexander Zverev	6^{1} 7^{7}	7^{7} 6^{4}	6^{4} 7^{7}
2	(Switzerland) (Germany)	Belinda Bencic; Andrea Petkovic	6; 3	6; 4
3	(Switzerland) (Germany)	Belinda Bencic / Roger Federer; Andrea Petkovic / Alexander Zverev	4; 1	4; 2

==== Germany vs. Great Britain ====
Germany
2
Perth Arena, Perth
6 January 2017, 10:00
Hard (i)

Great Britain
1

			1	2	3
1	(Germany) (United Kingdom)	Andrea Petkovic; Heather Watson	2; 6	6^{3} 7^{7}
2	(Germany) (United Kingdom)	Alexander Zverev; Daniel Evans	6; 4	6; 3
3	(Germany) (United Kingdom)	Andrea Petkovic / Alexander Zverev; Heather Watson / Daniel Evans	4; 2	4; 2

==== Switzerland vs. France ====
Switzerland
1
Perth Arena, Perth
6 January 2017, 17:30
Hard (i)

France
2

			1	2	3
1	(Switzerland) (France)	Roger Federer; Richard Gasquet	6; 1	6; 4
2	(Switzerland) (France)	Belinda Bencic; Kristina Mladenovic	4; 6	6; 2	3; 6
3	(Switzerland) (France)	Belinda Bencic / Roger Federer; Kristina Mladenovic / Richard Gasquet	2; 4	2; 4

=== Group B ===
All times are local (UTC+8).

==== Standings ====
		Australia	Czech Republic	Spain	United States	RR W–L	Matches W–L	Sets W–L	Games W–L	Standings
1	Australia		1–2	1–2	1–2	0–3	3–6	8–13	79–98	4
3	United States	2–1	3–0	3–0		3–0	8–1	17–6	110–77	1
6	Spain	2–1	2–1		0–3	2–1	4–5	10–10	82–83	2
8	Czech Republic	2–1		1–2	0–3	1–2	3–6	8–14	88–101	3

==== Czech Republic vs. United States ====
Czech Republic
0
Perth Arena, Perth
1 January 2017, 10:00
Hard (i)

United States
3

			1	2	3
1	(Czech Republic) (United States)	Lucie Hradecká; CoCo Vandeweghe	4; 6	2; 6
2	(Czech Republic) (United States)	Adam Pavlásek; Jack Sock	5; 7	6; 3	3; 6
3	(Czech Republic) (United States)	Lucie Hradecká / Adam Pavlásek; CoCo Vandeweghe / Jack Sock	4; 2	2; 4	1; 4

==== Australia vs. Spain ====
Australia
1
Perth Arena, Perth
1 January 2017, 17:30
Hard (i)

Spain
2

			1	2	3
1	(Australia) (Spain)	Nick Kyrgios; Feliciano López	6; 3	6; 4
2	(Australia) (Spain)	Daria Gavrilova; Lara Arruabarrena	5; 7	1; 6
3	(Australia) (Spain)	Daria Gavrilova / Nick Kyrgios; Lara Arruabarrena / Feliciano López	0; 4	2; 4

==== United States vs. Spain ====
United States
3
Perth Arena, Perth
3 January 2017, 10:00
Hard (i)

Spain
0

			1	2	3
1	(United States) (Spain)	CoCo Vandeweghe; Lara Arruabarrena	6; 2	6; 4
2	(United States) (Spain)	Jack Sock; Feliciano López	3; 6	6; 2	6; 3
3	(United States) (Spain)	CoCo Vandeweghe / Jack Sock; Lara Arruabarrena / Feliciano López	4^{5} 3^{3}	3^{2} 4^{5}	4^{5} 3^{2}

==== Australia vs. Czech Republic ====
Australia
1
Perth Arena, Perth
3 January 2017, 17:30
Hard (i)

Czech Republic
2

			1	2	3
1	(Australia) (Czech Republic)	Nick Kyrgios; Adam Pavlásek	7; 5	6; 4
2	(Australia) (Czech Republic)	Daria Gavrilova; Lucie Hradecká	6; 4	4; 6	4; 6
3	(Australia) (Czech Republic)	Daria Gavrilova / Nick Kyrgios; Lucie Hradecká / Adam Pavlásek	4^{5} 3^{1}	3^{1} 4^{5}	2; 4

==== Czech Republic vs. Spain ====
Czech Republic
1
Perth Arena, Perth
5 January 2017, 10:00
Hard (i)

Spain
2

			1	2	3
1	(Czech Republic) (Spain)	Lucie Hradecká; Lara Arruabarrena	6; 2	6; 4
2	(Czech Republic) (Spain)	Adam Pavlásek; Feliciano López	6^{5} 7^{7}	4; 6
3	(Czech Republic) (Spain)	Lucie Hradecká / Adam Pavlásek; Lara Arruabarrena / Feliciano López	2; 4	1; 4

==== Australia vs. United States ====
Australia
1
Perth Arena, Perth
5 January 2017, 17:30
Hard (i)

United States
2

			1	2	3
1	(Australia) (United States)	Nick Kyrgios; Jack Sock	2; 6	2; 6
2	(Australia) (United States)	Daria Gavrilova; CoCo Vandeweghe	6; 3	4; 6	7; 5
3	(Australia) (United States)	Daria Gavrilova / Matthew Ebden; CoCo Vandeweghe / Jack Sock	1; 4	1; 4

== Final ==
=== France vs. United States ===
France
2
Perth Arena, Perth
7 January 2017, 16:00
Hard (i)

United States
1

			1	2	3
1	(France) (United States)	Richard Gasquet; Jack Sock	6; 3	5; 7	7^{8} 6^{6}
2	(France) (United States)	Kristina Mladenovic; CoCo Vandeweghe	4; 6	5; 7
3	(France) (United States)	Kristina Mladenovic / Richard Gasquet; CoCo Vandeweghe / Jack Sock	4; 1	4^{5} 3^{0}

2017 Hopman Cup Champions
(France)
France
Second title

== See also ==
- 2017 Australian Open Series
