= 2013 Hopman Cup =

- Date: 29 December 2012 – 6 January 2013
- Edition: XXV
- Surface: Hard (indoor)
- Location: Perth, Western Australia
- Venue: Perth Arena

Champions
- Spain
- Hopman Cup

The Hopman Cup XXV (also known as the Hyundai Hopman Cup for sponsorship reasons) corresponds to the 25th edition of the Hopman Cup tournament between nations in men's and women's tennis. The tournament commenced on 29 December 2012 at the Perth Arena in Perth, Western Australia.

Eight teams competed for the title, with two round robin groups of four, from which the top team of each group progress to the final.

Czech Republic were the 2012 champions. In that tournament's final the Czech Republic team of Petra Kvitová and Tomáš Berdych defeated France's Marion Bartoli and Richard Gasquet 2–0. This was the Czech Republic's second Hopman Cup title. They decided not to defend their title; Berdych instead competed at the 2013 Aircel Chennai Open and Kvitová decided to participate at the 2013 Brisbane International.

The 2013 Hopman Cup was won by Spain – Spain's fourth title, defeating Serbia in the final 2–1. Serbia won the men's singles, followed by Spain's winning of the women's singles; then the deciding mixed doubles event was won by Spain in straight sets.

Hopman Cup XXV Champions
Spain

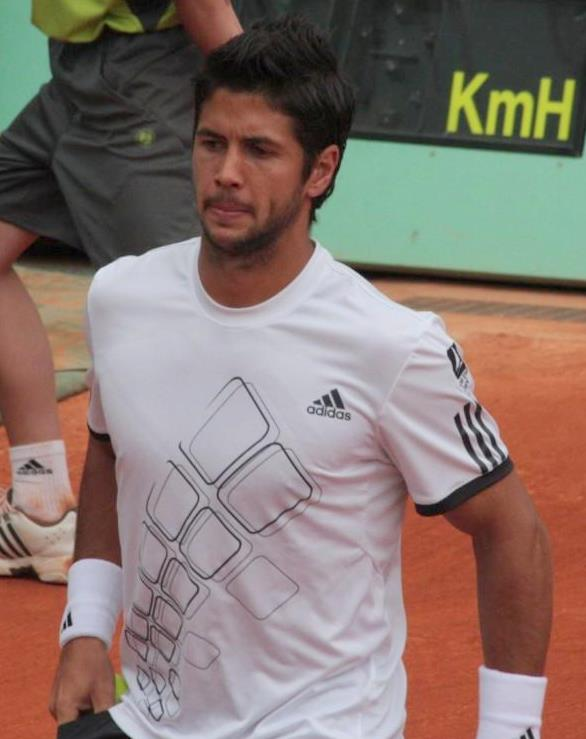
Fernando Verdasco

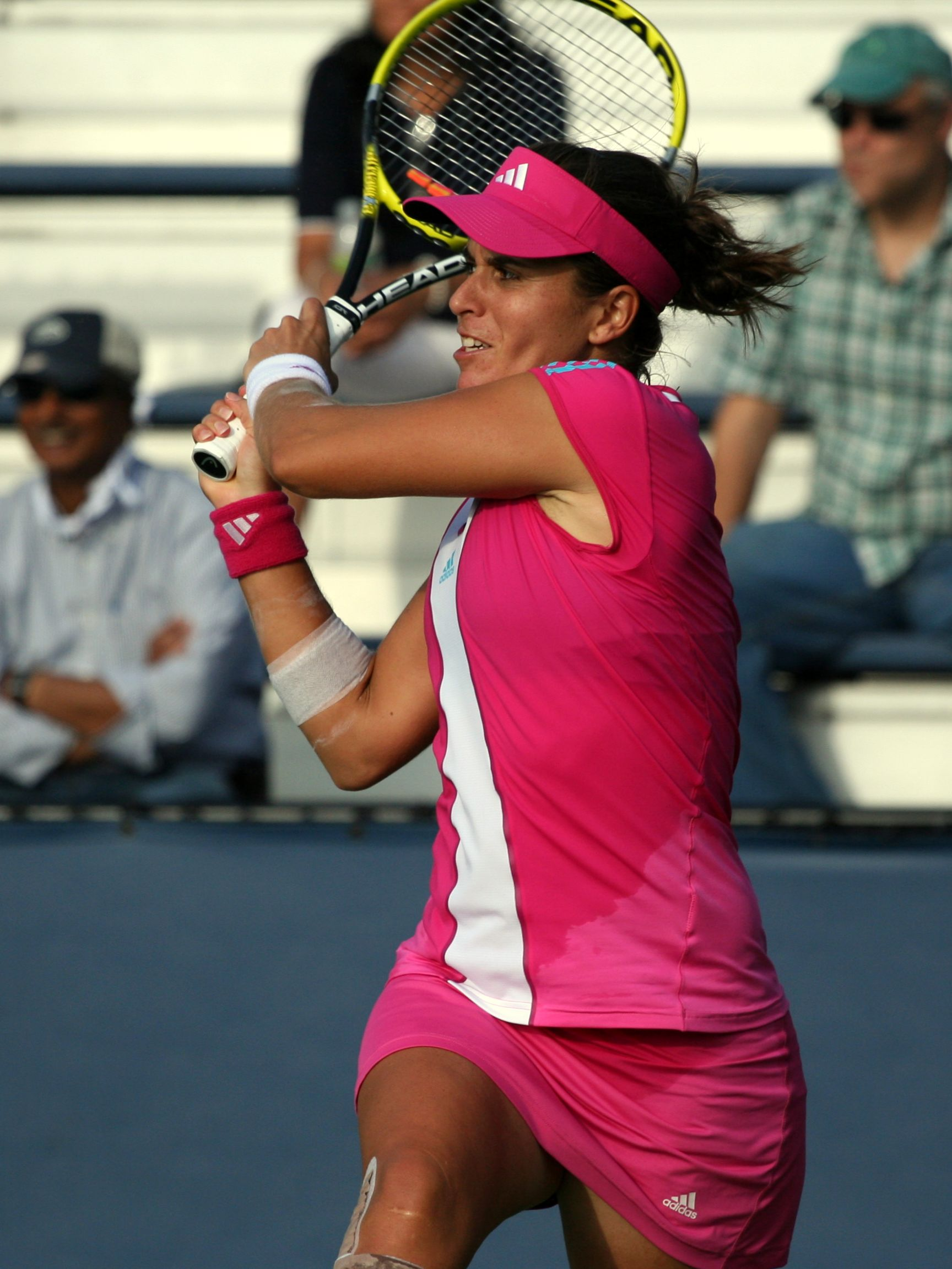
Anabel Medina Garrigues

== Tournament ==
The 2013 Hyundai Hopman Cup is an invitational tennis tournament and is also known as the Official Mixed Teams Championships of the ITF. The 2013 cup has prize money of $1 million and will follow the traditional round robin format, the leading teams after three round robin matches qualify for the final. All matches are best of three sets with the exception of the doubles match where a match tie break, first to ten points, is played if the match is tied at one set all. All ties are played in this format; women's singles, men's singles and finally mixed doubles. In the event of a tie in the final group standings the following will be used to separate the nations;

- The highest total of matches won
- Best percentage of sets won and lost
- Best percentage of games won and lost
- Head-to-head performances
- Toss of a coin

== Entrants ==
=== Seeds ===
The seeds for the 2013 Hopman Cup were decided by tournament director Steve Ayles, Paul Kilderry, Kim Hames and Terry Waldron.

Seed	Team	Female player	Male player
1	Serbia	Ana Ivanovic	Novak Djokovic
2	United States	Venus Williams	John Isner
3	Italy	Francesca Schiavone	Andreas Seppi
4	Spain	Anabel Medina Garrigues	Fernando Verdasco
5	Germany	Andrea Petkovic; Tatjana Malek	Tommy Haas
6	South Africa	Chanelle Scheepers	Kevin Anderson
7	France	Mathilde Johansson	Jo-Wilfried Tsonga
8	Australia	Ashleigh Barty	Bernard Tomic

=== Replacement players ===
pre-tournament

Team	Replacement	Original player
Australia	Ashleigh Barty	Casey Dellacqua

in-tournament temporary replacements

Team	Replacement	Original player
Germany	Tatjana Malek	Andrea Petkovic
Germany	(Australia) Thanasi Kokkinakis	Tommy Haas
United States	(Australia) Thanasi Kokkinakis	John Isner

== Group stage ==
=== Group A ===
All times are local (UTC+8).

==== Standings ====
Pos.	Country	W	L	Matches	Sets	Games
1	Serbia	3	0	7–2	14–5	103–55
2	Australia	2	1	6–3	14–8	104–64
3	Italy	1	2	4–5	8–12	84–104
4	Germany	0	3	1–8	5–16	49–117

==== Germany vs. Australia ====
Germany
0
Perth Arena, Perth
29 December 2012, 17:45
Hard (indoors)

Australia
3

			1	2	3
1	(Germany) (Australia)	Tommy Haas; Bernard Tomic	6^{6} 7^{8}	6; 3	5; 7
2	(Germany) (Australia)	Andrea Petkovic; Ashleigh Barty	6; 4			retired
3	(Germany) (Australia)	Andrea Petkovic / Tommy Haas; Ashleigh Barty / Bernard Tomic				w/o

Scores stand as 6–0, 6–0 win for Barty and 6–0, 6–0 win for Barty/Tomic.

==== Serbia vs. Italy ====
Serbia
2
Perth Arena, Perth
31 December 2012, 10:00
Hard (indoors)

Italy
1

			1	2	3
1	(Serbia) (Italy)	Ana Ivanovic; Francesca Schiavone	6; 0	6; 4
2	(Serbia) (Italy)	Novak Djokovic; Andreas Seppi	6; 3	6; 4
3	(Serbia) (Italy)	Ana Ivanovic / Novak Djokovic; Francesca Schiavone / Andreas Seppi	6^{4} 7^{7}	4; 6

==== Italy vs. Germany ====
Italy
2
Perth Arena, Perth
2 January 2013, 10:00
Hard (indoors)

Germany
1

			1	2	3
1	(Italy) (Germany)	Andreas Seppi; Tommy Haas	6^{3} 7^{7}	6^{7} 7^{9}
2	(Italy) (Germany)	Francesca Schiavone; Tatjana Malek	3; 6	6; 3	6; 3
3	(Italy) (Germany)	Francesca Schiavone / Andreas Seppi; Tatjana Malek / Tommy Haas	6; 4	7; 5

==== Serbia vs. Australia ====
Serbia
2
Perth Arena, Perth
2 January 2013, 17:45
Hard (indoors)

Australia
1

			1	2	3
1	(Serbia) (Australia)	Novak Djokovic; Bernard Tomic	4; 6	4; 6
2	(Serbia) (Australia)	Ana Ivanovic; Ashleigh Barty	6; 2	6; 3
3	(Serbia) (Australia)	Ana Ivanovic / Novak Djokovic; Ashleigh Barty / Bernard Tomic	6; 4	6^{8} 7^{10}	10; 6

==== Italy vs. Australia ====
Italy
1
Perth Arena, Perth
3 January 2013, 17:45
Hard (indoors)

Australia
2

			1	2	3
1	(Italy) (Australia)	Andreas Seppi; Bernard Tomic	3; 6	5; 7
2	(Italy) (Australia)	Francesca Schiavone; Ashleigh Barty	0; 6	3; 6
3	(Italy) (Australia)	Francesca Schiavone / Andreas Seppi; Ashleigh Barty / Bernard Tomic	2; 6	6; 4	10; 3

==== Serbia vs. Germany ====
Serbia
3
Perth Arena, Perth
4 January 2013, 17:45
Hard (indoors)

Germany
0

			1	2	3
1	(Serbia) (Germany)	Novak Djokovic; Tommy Haas	6; 2	6; 0
2	(Serbia) (Germany)	Ana Ivanovic; Tatjana Malek	6; 0	6; 1
3	(Serbia) (Germany)	Ana Ivanovic / Novak Djokovic; Tatjana Malek / Thanasi Kokkinakis	6; 2	7; 5

Score stands as 6–0, 6–0 win for Ivanovic/Djokovic due to Haas' withdrawal before the mixed match.

=== Group B ===
All times are local (UTC+8).

==== Standings ====
Pos.	Country	W	L	Matches	Sets	Games
1	Spain	3	0	7–2	14–5	103–54
2	United States	2	1	4–5	8–13	74–102
3	South Africa	1	2	4–5	10–11	100–103
4	France	0	3	3–6	9–12	88–106

==== Spain vs. South Africa ====
Spain
2
Perth Arena, Perth
29 December 2012, 10:00
Hard (indoors)

South Africa
1

			1	2	3
1	(Spain) (South Africa)	Fernando Verdasco; Kevin Anderson	6^{5} 7^{7}	4; 6
2	(Spain) (South Africa)	Anabel Medina Garrigues; Chanelle Scheepers	6; 4	6; 2
3	(Spain) (South Africa)	Anabel Medina Garrigues / Fernando Verdasco; Chanelle Scheepers / Kevin Anderson	6; 4	6^{4} 7^{7}	10; 8

==== USA vs. South Africa ====
United States
2
Perth Arena, Perth
30 December 2012, 10:00
Hard (indoors)

South Africa
1

			1	2	3
1	(United States) (South Africa)	Venus Williams; Chanelle Scheepers	4; 6	6; 2	6; 3
2	(United States) (South Africa)	John Isner; Kevin Anderson	6^{0} 7^{7}	6^{5} 7^{7}
3	(United States) (South Africa)	Venus Williams / John Isner; Chanelle Scheepers / Kevin Anderson	6; 3	6; 2

==== Spain vs. France ====
Spain
2
Perth Arena, Perth
30 December 2012, 17:45
Hard (indoors)

France
1

			1	2	3
1	(Spain) (France)	Fernando Verdasco; Jo-Wilfried Tsonga	5; 7	3; 6
2	(Spain) (France)	Anabel Medina Garrigues; Mathilde Johansson	6; 3	6; 2
3	(Spain) (France)	Anabel Medina Garrigues / Fernando Verdasco; Mathilde Johansson / Jo-Wilfried Tsonga	6; 3	6; 3

==== USA vs. France ====
United States
2
Perth Arena, Perth
1 January 2013, 17:45
Hard (indoors)

France
1

			1	2	3
1	(United States) (France)	John Isner; Jo-Wilfried Tsonga	3; 6	2; 6
2	(United States) (France)	Venus Williams; Mathilde Johansson	3; 6	7; 5	6; 4
3	(United States) (France)	Venus Williams / John Isner; Mathilde Johansson / Jo-Wilfried Tsonga	6^{5} 7^{7}	6; 2	10; 8

==== USA vs. Spain ====
United States
1
Perth Arena, Perth
3 January 2013, 10:00
Hard (indoors)

Spain
2

			1	2	3
1	(United States) (Spain)	Thanasi Kokkinakis; Fernando Verdasco	6^{4} 7^{7}	3; 6
2	(United States) (Spain)	Venus Williams; Anabel Medina Garrigues	6; 3	6; 4
3	(United States) (Spain)	Venus Williams / Thanasi Kokkinakis; Anabel Medina Garrigues / Fernando Verdasco	1; 6	3; 6

Scores stand as 3–0 win for Spain; 6–0, 6–0 win for Verdasco; 6–0, 6–0 win for Medina Garrigues and 6–0, 6–0 win for Verdasco/Medina Garrigues due to John Isner withdrawal before start of USA vs. Spain match.

==== South Africa vs. France ====
South Africa
2
Perth Arena, Perth
4 January 2013, 10:00
Hard (indoors)

France
1

			1	2	3
1	(South Africa) (France)	Chanelle Scheepers; Mathilde Johansson	4; 6	6; 4	6; 4
2	(South Africa) (France)	Kevin Anderson; Jo-Wilfried Tsonga	6^{3} 7^{7}	6^{4} 7^{7}
3	(South Africa) (France)	Chanelle Scheepers / Kevin Anderson; Mathilde Johansson / Jo-Wilfried Tsonga	6; 3			retired

Score stands as 6–0, 6–0 win for Scheepers/Anderson.

== Final ==
=== Serbia vs. Spain ===
Serbia
1
Perth Arena, Perth
5 January 2013, 17:45
Hard (indoors)

Spain
2

			1	2	3
1	(Serbia) (Spain)	Novak Djokovic; Fernando Verdasco	6; 3	7; 5
2	(Serbia) (Spain)	Ana Ivanovic; Anabel Medina Garrigues	4; 6	7^{7} 6^{3}	2; 6
3	(Serbia) (Spain)	Ana Ivanovic / Novak Djokovic; Anabel Medina Garrigues / Fernando Verdasco	4; 6	5; 7

2013 Hopman Cup Champions
(Spain)
Spain
Fourth title
