= Italy at the Hopman Cup =

Sporting event delegation

Italy
- First year: 1990
- Years played: 11
- Runners-up: 1 (2025)
- Most total wins: Francesca Schiavone (14–10)
- Most singles wins: Francesca Schiavone (8–5)
- Most doubles wins: Francesca Schiavone (6–5)
- Best doubles team: Pennetta & Bolelli (2–0); Schiavone & Starace (2–0)
- Most years played: Francesca Schiavone (4)

Italy is a nation that has competed at the Hopman Cup tennis tournament on 11 occasions. The nation's first appearance came at the 2nd staging of the event in 1990.

== Players ==
This is a list of players who have played for Italy in the Hopman Cup.

Name	Total W–L	Singles W–L	Doubles W–L	First year played	No. of years played
Simone Bolelli	3–1	1–1	2–0	2009	1
Lucia Bronzetti	2–4	2–1	0–3	2025	1
Paolo Canè	1–5	0–3	1–2	1990	2
Flavio Cobolli	3–3	3–0	0–3	2025	1
Silvia Farina Elia	1–4	1–2	0–2	2003	1
Fabio Fognini	1–4	0–3	1–1	2015	1
Laura Golarsa	2–2	1–1	1–1	1990	1
Flavia Pennetta	6–10	2–7	4–3	2009	3
Raffaella Reggi	0–2	0–1	0–1	1991	1
Davide Sanguinetti	4–14	3–7	1–7	2002	3
Andreas Seppi	3–3	0-3	3-0	2013	2
Francesca Schiavone	14–10	8–5	6–5	2002	4
Potito Starace	3–2	1–2	2–0	2011	1

== Results ==
Year	Competition	Location	Opponent	Score	Result
1990	Round One	Burswood Dome, Perth	Sweden	2–1	Won
1990	Quarterfinal	Burswood Dome, Perth	United States	0–3	Lost
1991	Round One	Burswood Dome, Perth	Yugoslavia	0–3	Lost
2002 ^{1}	Qualification Play-Off	Burswood Dome, Perth	Greece	2–1	Won
2002 ^{1}	Round Robin	Burswood Dome, Perth	Belgium	1–2	Lost
2002 ^{1}	Round Robin	Burswood Dome, Perth	United States	2–1	Won
2002 ^{1}	Round Robin	Burswood Dome, Perth	France	2–1	Won
2003 ^{2}	Round Robin	Burswood Dome, Perth	Australia	0–3	Lost
2003 ^{2}	Round Robin	Burswood Dome, Perth	Czech Republic	1–2	Lost
2003 ^{2}	Round Robin	Burswood Dome, Perth	Slovakia	0–3	Lost
2005	Round Robin	Burswood Dome, Perth	Argentina	1–2	Lost
2005	Round Robin	Burswood Dome, Perth	Germany	1–2	Lost
2005	Round Robin	Burswood Dome, Perth	Russia	2–1	Won
2009 ^{3}	Round Robin	Burswood Dome, Perth	Russia	1–2	Lost
2009 ^{3}	Round Robin	Burswood Dome, Perth	France	2–1	Won
2009 ^{3}	Round Robin	Burswood Dome, Perth	Chinese Taipei	3–0	Won
2011 ^{4}	Round Robin	Burswood Dome, Perth	Great Britain	2–1	Won
2011 ^{4}	Round Robin	Burswood Dome, Perth	United States	1–2	Lost
2011 ^{4}	Round Robin	Burswood Dome, Perth	France	0–3	Lost
2013	Round Robin	Perth Arena, Perth	Serbia	1–2	Lost
2013	Round Robin	Perth Arena, Perth	Germany	2–1	Won
2013	Round Robin	Perth Arena, Perth	Australia	1–2	Lost
2014	Round Robin	Perth Arena, Perth	Poland	0–3	Lost
2014	Round Robin	Perth Arena, Perth	Australia	2–1	Won
2014	Round Robin	Perth Arena, Perth	Canada	1–2	Lost
2015	Round Robin	Perth Arena, Perth	United States	0–3	Lost
2015	Round Robin	Perth Arena, Perth	Czech Republic	0–3	Lost
2015	Round Robin	Perth Arena, Perth	Canada	1–2	Lost
2025	Round Robin	Fiera del Levante, Bari	Croatia	2–1	Won
2025	Round Robin	Fiera del Levante, Bari	France	2–1	Won
2025	Final	Fiera del Levante, Bari	Canada	1–2	Lost

^{1} The two points gained by Italy in the 2002 tie against France came as a result of the female French competitor, Virginie Razzano's retirement in the singles and subsequent inability to compete in the doubles.
^{2} Italy did not play the mixed doubles dead rubber against Australia in 2003, defaulting the point.
^{3} In 2009, the male competitor from Chinese Taipei was unable to compete in either of his matches, thus defaulting two points to the Italians and contributing to the eventual 3–0 win for Italy.
^{4} Francesca Schiavone was forced to retire from her singles match against France in 2011 and was not able to compete in the mixed doubles, thus defaulting two points to the French.
