= Agnieszka Radwańska career statistics =

Career finals
| Discipline | Type | Won | Lost | Total |
|---|---|---|---|---|
| Singles | Grand Slam | 0 | 1 | 1 |
| Singles | WTA Finals (Note: Formerly known as: Virginia Slims Championships (until 1995); WTA Tour Championships (until 2014)) | 1 | 0 | 1 |
| Singles | WTA Elite (Note: Elite tier: WTA Tournament of Champions (2009–14); WTA Elite Trophy (2015–present)) | – | – | – |
| Singles | WTA 1000 (Note: Formerly known as: Category 4 & 5 & 6 (until 1990); Tier I (until 2009); WTA Premier Mandatory and 5 (until 2021)) | 5 | 3 | 8 |
| Singles | WTA 500 (Note: Formerly known as: Category 3 (until 1990); Tier II (until 2009); WTA Premier (until 2021)) | 7 | 4 | 11 |
| Singles | WTA 250 (Note: Formerly known as: Category 1 & 2 (until 1990); Tier III & IV & V (until 2009); WTA International (until 2021)) | 7 | 0 | 7 |
| Singles | Olympics | – | – | – |
| Singles | Total | 20 | 8 | 28 |
| Doubles | Grand Slam | – | – | – |
| Doubles | WTA Finals | – | – | – |
| Doubles | WTA Elite | – | – | – |
| Doubles | WTA 1000 | 1 | 1 | 2 |
| Doubles | WTA 500 | 0 | 1 | 1 |
| Doubles | WTA 250 | 1 | 0 | 1 |
| Doubles | Olympics | – | – | – |
| Doubles | Total | 2 | 2 | 4 |

This is a list of the main career statistics of Agnieszka Radwańska, a former professional tennis player from Poland. Radwańska won 20 WTA Tour singles titles, including one year-end championship at the 2015 WTA Finals, three Premier Mandatory singles titles, and two Premier 5 titles. Along with that, she won two titles in doubles, including one major - at the 2011 Miami Open. On the ITF Women's Circuit, she has four titles (per two in both events). On the WTA rankings, Radwańska achieved a career high singles ranking of world No. 2 on July 9, 2012, right after reaching final of the Wimbledon Championships.

Despite not winning any major, she had impressive performances. In singles, she reached one final at the 2012 Wimbledon Championships. Along with that, she has six semifinals appearances (four in singles and two in doubles) and nine quarterfinals (seven in singles and two in doubles). She reached at least semifinal at all four majors in either events. At the Premier Mandatory & 5 tournaments she went one step further. In 2011, she won back-to-back Pan Pacific and China Open. The following year, she won the Miami Open. Later, in 2014 she won the Canadian Open and then in 2016 another title at the China Open.

Radwańska also set some records for the country (Poland). In August 2007, she became the first player representing Poland to win a WTA Tour singles title. At the end of 2008, she finished the year ranked world no. 10, becoming the first Polish player to achieve that. She also became the first Polish player to surpass $1 million in earnings. In 2012, she cracked the top 3 of the WTA rankings for the first time in her career. Reaching final of the 2012 Wimbledon Championships, shereached her first became the first player representing Poland to reach the final of a Grand Slam singles event in the Open Era.

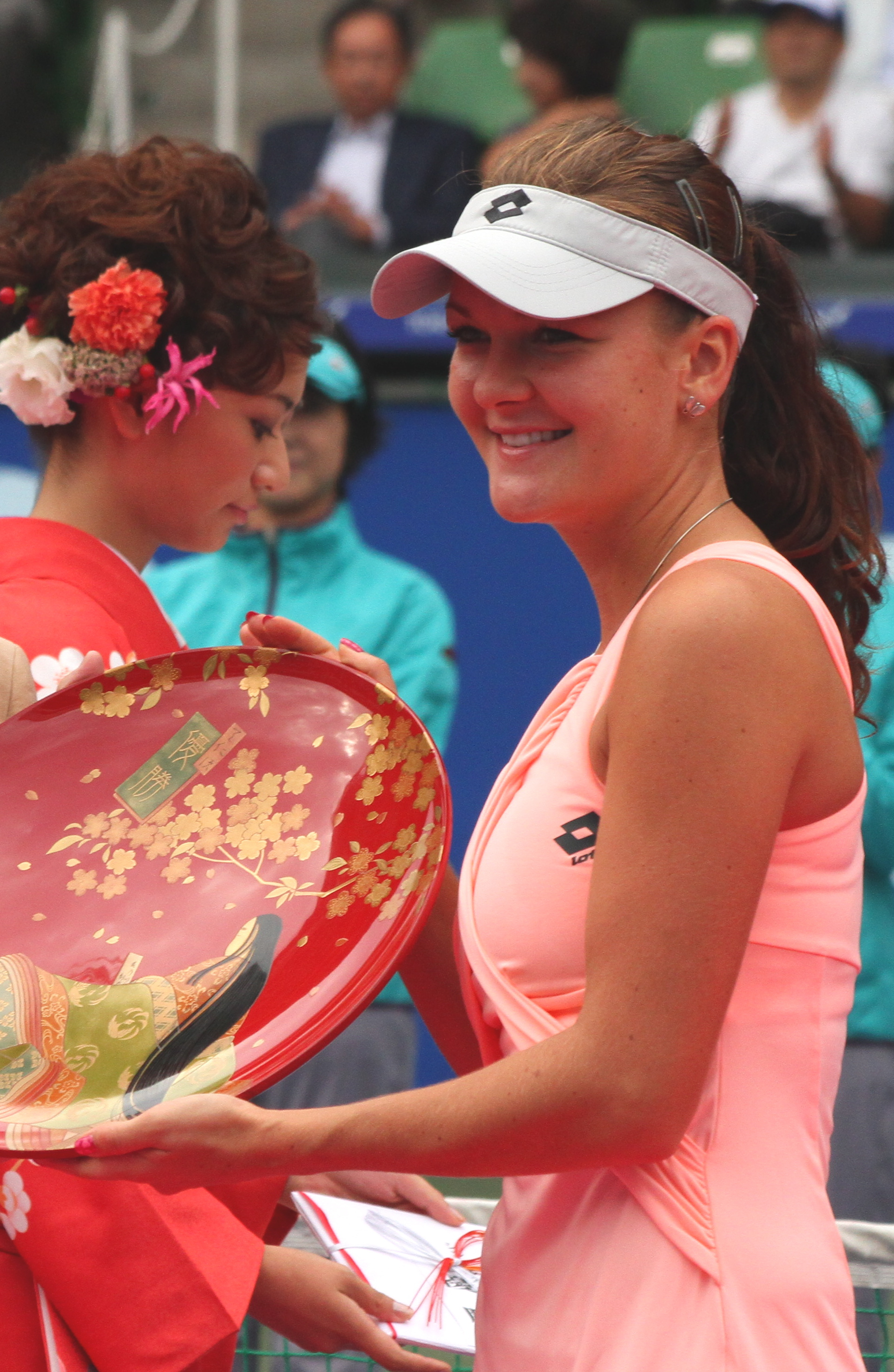
Radwańska at the 2011 Pan Pacific Open holding the trophy.

== Performance timelines ==
Key
| W | F | SF | QF | #R | RR | Q# | P# | DNQ | A | Z# | PO | G | S | B | NMS | NTI | P | NH |

(W) winner; (F) finalist; (SF) semifinalist; (QF) quarterfinalist; (#R) rounds 4, 3, 2, 1; (RR) round-robin stage; (Q#) qualification round; (P#) preliminary round; (DNQ) did not qualify; (A) absent; (Z#) Davis/Fed Cup Zonal Group (with number indication) or (PO) play-off; (G) gold, (S) silver or (B) bronze Olympic/Paralympic medal; (NMS) not a Masters tournament; (NTI) not a Tier I tournament; (P) postponed; (NH) not held; (SR) strike rate (events won / competed); (W–L) win–loss record.
To avoid confusion and double counting, these charts are updated at the conclusion of a tournament or when the player's participation has ended.

Only main-draw results in WTA Tour, Grand Slam tournaments, Billie Jean King Cup (Fed Cup), Hopman Cup and Olympic Games are included in win–loss records.

=== Singles ===
| Tournament | 2004 | 2005 | 2006 | 2007 | 2008 | 2009 | 2010 | 2011 | 2012 | 2013 | 2014 | 2015 | 2016 | 2017 | 2018 | SR | W–L | Win% |
|---|---|---|---|---|---|---|---|---|---|---|---|---|---|---|---|---|---|---|
Grand Slam tournaments
| Australian Open | A | A | A | 2R | QF | 1R | 3R | QF | QF | QF | SF | 4R | SF | 2R | 3R | 0 / 12 | 35–12 | 74% |
| French Open | A | A | A | 1R | 4R | 4R | 2R | 4R | 3R | QF | 3R | 1R | 4R | 3R | A | 0 / 11 | 23–11 | 68% |
| Wimbledon | A | A | 4R | 3R | QF | QF | 4R | 2R | F | SF | 4R | SF | 4R | 4R | 2R | 0 / 13 | 43–13 | 77% |
| US Open | A | A | 2R | 4R | 4R | 2R | 2R | 2R | 4R | 4R | 2R | 3R | 4R | 3R | 1R | 0 / 13 | 24–13 | 65% |
| Win–loss | 0–0 | 0–0 | 4–2 | 6–4 | 14–4 | 8–4 | 7–4 | 9–4 | 15–4 | 16–4 | 11–4 | 10–4 | 14–4 | 8–4 | 3–3 | 0 / 49 | 125–49 | 72% |
Year-end championships
| WTA Finals | DNQ | | | | RR | RR | DNQ | RR | SF | RR | SF | W | SF | DNQ | | 1 / 8 | 11–14 | 44% |
National representation
| Summer Olympics | A | NH | | | 2R | NH | | | 1R | NH | | | 1R | NH | | 0 / 3 | 1–3 | 25% |
WTA 1000 + former^{†} tournaments
| Dubai / Qatar Open (Note: The first Premier 5 event of the year has switched back and forth between the Dubai Tennis Championships and the Qatar Total Open since 2009. Dubai was classified as a Premier 5 event from 2009 to 2011 before being succeeded by Doha for the 2012–2014 period. In 2015, Dubai regained its Premier 5 status while Doha was demoted to Premier status. The Premier 5 tournaments were reclassified as WTA 1000 tournaments in 2021.) | NMS | | | | SF | 1R | SF | QF | SF | SF | SF | 3R | SF | 3R | 2R | 0 / 11 | 23–11 | 68% |
| Indian Wells Open | A | A | A | 2R | QF | QF | SF | 4R | QF | 4R | F | 3R | SF | 3R | 2R | 0 / 12 | 29–12 | 71% |
| Miami Open | A | A | A | 4R | 2R | 4R | QF | QF | W | SF | QF | 4R | 4R | 3R | 4R | 1 / 12 | 31–11 | 74% |
| Berlin / Madrid Open (Note: In 2009, the German Open was replaced by the Madrid Open. The Premier Mandatory tournaments were reclassified as WTA 1000 tournaments in 2021.) | A | A | A | A | 3R | 1R | 2R | 2R | SF | 2R | SF | 3R | 1R | A | A | 0 / 9 | 15–9 | 63% |
| Italian Open | A | A | A | 1R | 3R | QF | 3R | 2R | 2R | 2R | QF | A | A | A | A | 0 / 8 | 8–8 | 50% |
| Canadian Open | A | A | A | A | A | QF | 3R | SF | QF | SF | W | QF | 3R | 3R | A | 1 / 9 | 23–8 | 74% |
| Cincinnati Open | NMS | | | | | 2R | 3R | A | QF | QF (Note: Withdraw during the tournament. Not counted as a loss.) | QF | 1R | QF | 1R | 1R | 0 / 9 | 10–8 | 56% |
| Pan Pacific / Wuhan Open (Note: In 2014, the Pan Pacific Open was downgraded to a Premier event and replaced by the Wuhan Open. The Premier 5 tournaments were reclassified as WTA 1000 tournaments in 2021.) | A | A | A | A | QF | SF | QF | W | F | QF | 2R | 1R | QF | 3R | A | 1 / 10 | 24–9 | 73% |
| China Open | NMS | | | | | F | 1R | W | QF | SF | 2R | SF | W | 3R | A | 2 / 9 | 28–7 | 80% |
| Charleston Open^{†} | A | A | A | A | 3R | NMS | | | | | | | | | | 0 / 1 | 2–1 | 67% |
| Kremlin Cup^{†} | A | A | A | 2R | A | NMS | | | | | | | | | | 0 / 1 | 1–1 | 50% |
| Zurich Open^{†} | A | A | Q1 | QF | NH/NMS | | | | | | | | | | | 0 / 1 | 2–1 | 67% |
| Win–loss | 0–0 | 0–0 | 0–0 | 7–5 | 14–7 | 20–9 | 16–9 | 23–6 | 26–8 | 21–8 | 25–8 | 12–8 | 20–7 | 9–7 | 3–4 | 5 / 92 | 196–86 | 70% |
Career statistics
| | 2004 | 2005 | 2006 | 2007 | 2008 | 2009 | 2010 | 2011 | 2012 | 2013 | 2014 | 2015 | 2016 | 2017 | 2018 | SR | W–L | Win% |
| Tournaments | 0 | 0 | 8 | 20 | 24 | 24 | 18 | 20 | 22 | 21 | 21 | 23 | 21 | 18 | 14 | Career total: 254 | | |
| Titles | 0 | 0 | 0 | 1 | 3 | 0 | 0 | 3 | 3 | 3 | 1 | 3 | 3 | 0 | 0 | Career total: 20 | | |
| Finals | 0 | 0 | 0 | 1 | 3 | 1 | 1 | 3 | 5 | 4 | 2 | 4 | 3 | 1 | 0 | Career total: 28 | | |
| Hardcourt win–loss | 0–0 | 0–0 | 6–4 | 18–11 | 30–16 | 33–18 | 27–14 | 39–13 | 45–12 | 52–14 | 37–16 | 40–20 | 43–12 | 20–14 | 10–11 | 17 / 178 | 400–175 | 70% |
| Clay win–loss | 0–0 | 0–0 | 6–3 | 9–5 | 14–5 | 10–4 | 4–4 | 7–4 | 12–4 | 5–3 | 11–4 | 2–3 | 5–3 | 2–2 | 0–1 | 2 / 47 | 87–45 | 66% |
| Grass win–loss | 0–0 | 0–0 | 3–1 | 4–3 | 8–1 | 6–2 | 3–2 | 3–2 | 6–3 | 5–2 | 3–2 | 12–3 | 5–3 | 3–2 | 4–2 | 1 / 29 | 65–28 | 70% |
| Overall win–loss | 0–0 | 0–0 | 15–8 | 31–19 | 52–22 | 49–24 | 34–20 | 49–19 | 63–19 | 62–19 | 51–22 | 54–26 | 53–18 | 25–18 | 14–14 | 20 / 254 | 552–248 | 69% |
| Win % | – | – | 65% | 63% | 70% | 67% | 63% | 72% | 77% | 77% | 68% | 67% | 75% | 58% | 50% | Career total: 69% | | |
| Year-end ranking' | 941 | 381 | 57 | 26 | 10 | 10 | 14 | 8 | 4 | 5 | 6 | 5 | 3 | 28 | 75 | $27,612,200 | | |

=== Doubles ===
| Tournament | 2006 | 2007 | 2008 | 2009 | 2010 | 2011 | 2012 | 2013 | 2014 | 2015 | SR | W–L | Win% |
|---|---|---|---|---|---|---|---|---|---|---|---|---|---|
Grand Slam tournaments
| Australian Open | A | 1R | 1R | 2R | SF | 3R | 3R | A | A | A | 0 / 6 | 9–6 | 60% |
| French Open | A | 3R | 1R | QF | QF | 1R | 2R | A | A | A | 0 / 6 | 9–6 | 60% |
| Wimbledon | A | 3R | 2R | 1R | 2R | 3R | 3R | A | A | A | 0 / 6 | 8–5 | 62% |
| US Open | A | 2R | 1R | 1R | 3R | SF | A | A | A | A | 0 / 5 | 7–5 | 58% |
| Win–loss | 0–0 | 5–4 | 1–4 | 4–4 | 10–4 | 8–4 | 5–2 | 0–0 | 0–0 | 0–0 | 0 / 23 | 33–22 | 60% |
Olympic Games
| Summer Olympics | NH | | 1R | NH | | | 2R | NH | | | 0 / 2 | 1–2 | 33% |
Premier Mandatory & 5 + former
| Dubai / Qatar Open | NMS | | QF | F | 2R | QF | 2R | A | A | A | 0 / 5 | 9–5 | 64% |
| Indian Wells Open | A | A | QF | 1R | QF | SF | A | A | A | A | 0 / 4 | 6–4 | 60% |
| Miami Open | A | A | 1R | 1R | QF | W | 2R | A | A | A | 1 / 5 | 8–4 | 67% |
| Berlin / Madrid Open | A | A | 2R | A | QF | 1R | 1R | A | A | A | 0 / 4 | 3–4 | 43% |
| Italian Open | A | A | QF | 2R | A | 2R | A | A | A | A | 0 / 3 | 4–2 | 67% |
| Canadian Open | A | A | A | 2R | 2R | A | A | A | A | A | 0 / 2 | 2–2 | 50% |
| Cincinnati Open | NMS | | | A | A | A | A | A | A | A | 0 / 0 | 0–0 | – |
| Pan Pacific Open | A | A | QF | A | A | A | A | A | A | A | 0 / 1 | 1–1 | 50% |
| China Open | NMS | | | A | A | QF | A | A | A | A | 0 / 1 | 2–1 | 67% |
| Charleston Open (former) | A | A | 1R | NMS | | | | | | | 0 / 1 | 0–1 | 0% |
| Kremlin Cup (former) | A | 1R | A | NMS | | | | | | | 0 / 1 | 0–1 | 0% |
| Win–loss | 0–0 | 0–1 | 7–7 | 6–4 | 8–5 | 13–5 | 1–3 | 0–0 | 0–0 | 0–0 | 1 / 27 | 35–25 | 58% |
Career statistics
| Tournament | 2006 | 2007 | 2008 | 2009 | 2010 | 2011 | 2012 | 2013 | 2014 | 2015 | SR | W–L | Win% |
| Tournaments | 7 | 13 | 18 | 11 | 9 | 11 | 8 | 0 (Note: During the season, she did not play in the main-draw of any WTA Tour-level tournaments. However, she played at the Billie Jean King Cup that is not counted as a played tournament but matches counted.) | 0 | 0 | Career total: 77 | | |
| Titles | 0 | 1 | 0 | 0 | 0 | 1 | 0 | 0 | 0 | 0 | Career total: 2 | | |
| Finals | 0 | 1 | 0 | 2 | 0 | 1 | 0 | 0 | 0 | 0 | Career total: 4 | | |
| Hardcourt win–loss | 1–3 | 4–6 | 8–12 | 10–8 | 12–6 | 19–6 | 4–5 | 2–0 | 1–0 | 0–1 | 1 / 46 | 61–47 | 56% |
| Clay win–loss | 1–4 | 8–3 | 3–5 | 0–1 | 1–1 | 1–3 | 1–2 | 0–0 | 1–0 | 0–0 | 1 / 23 | 16–19 | 46% |
| Grass win–loss | 0–0 | 2–2 | 1–1 | 4–1 | 5–2 | 2–1 | 3–1 | 0–0 | 0–0 | 0–0 | 0 / 8 | 17–8 | 68% |
| Overall win–loss | 2–7 | 14–11 | 12–18 | 14–10 | 18–9 | 22–10 | 8–8 | 2–0 | 2–0 | 0–1 | 2 / 77 | 94–74 | 56% |
| Year-end ranking | 212 | 71 | 60 | 46 | 27 | 16 | 100 | n/a | n/a | n/a | | | |

== Grand Slam tournament finals ==
=== Singles: 1 (runner-up) ===
| Result | Year | Championship | Surface | Opponent | Score |
|---|---|---|---|---|---|
| Loss | 2012 | Wimbledon | Grass | (United States) Serena Williams | 1–6, 7–5, 2–6 |

== Other significant finals ==
=== WTA Finals ===
==== Singles: 1 (title) ====
| Result | Year | Tournament | Surface | Opponent | Score |
|---|---|---|---|---|---|
| Win | 2015 | WTA Finals, Singapore | Hard (i) | (Czech Republic) Petra Kvitová | 6–2, 4–6, 6–3 |

=== Premier Mandatory & Premier 5 tournaments ===
==== Singles: 8 (5 titles, 3 runner-ups) ====
| Result | Year | Tournament | Surface | Opponent | Score |
|---|---|---|---|---|---|
| Loss | 2009 | China Open | Hard | (Russia) Svetlana Kuznetsova | 2–6, 4–6 |
| Win | 2011 | Pan Pacific Open | Hard | (Russia) Vera Zvonareva | 6–3, 6–2 |
| Win | 2011 | China Open | Hard | (Germany) Andrea Petkovic | 7–5, 0–6, 6–4 |
| Win | 2012 | Miami Open | Hard | (Russia) Maria Sharapova | 7–5, 6–4 |
| Loss | 2012 | Pan Pacific Open | Hard | (Russia) Nadia Petrova | 0–6, 6–1, 3–6 |
| Loss | 2014 | Indian Wells Open | Hard | (Italy) Flavia Pennetta | 2–6, 1–6 |
| Win | 2014 | Canadian Open | Hard | (United States) Venus Williams | 6–4, 6–2 |
| Win | 2016 | China Open (2) | Hard | (United Kingdom) Johanna Konta | 6–4, 6–2 |

==== Doubles: 2 (1 title, 1 runner-up) ====
| Result | Year | Tournament | Surface | Partner | Opponents | Score |
|---|---|---|---|---|---|---|
| Loss | 2009 | Dubai Championships | Hard | (Russia) Maria Kirilenko | (Zimbabwe) Cara Black; (United States) Liezel Huber | 3–6, 3–6 |
| Win | 2011 | Miami Open | Hard | (Slovakia) Daniela Hantuchová | (United States) Liezel Huber (Russia) Nadia Petrova | 7–6^{(7–5)}, 2–6, [10–8] |

== WTA career finals ==
=== Singles: 28 (20 titles, 8 runner-ups) ===
| Legend Grand Slam (0–1) WTA Finals (1–0) Premier M & Premier 5 (5–3) Premier (7–4) International (7–0) | Finals by surface Hard (17–6) Grass (1–2) Clay (2–0) Carpet (0–0) | Finals by setting Outdoors (19–8) Indoors (1–0) |

| Result | W–L | Date | Tournament | Tier | Surface | Opponent | Score |
|---|---|---|---|---|---|---|---|
| Win | 1–0 | Aug 2007 | Nordea Nordic Light Open, Sweden | Tier IV (Note: Includes WTA Premier and WTA International tournaments. The WTA Tier II tournaments were reclassified as WTA Premier tournaments in 2009, while the WTA Tier III tournaments, WTA Tier IV tournaments and WTA Tier V tournaments were reclassified as WTA International tournaments the same year .) | Hard | (Russia) Vera Dushevina | 6–1, 6–1 |
| Win | 2–0 | Feb 2008 | Pattaya Open, Thailand | Tier IV | Hard | (United States) Jill Craybas | 6–2, 1–6, 7–6^{(7–4)} |
| Win | 3–0 | May 2008 | İstanbul Cup, Turkey | Tier III | Clay | (Russia) Elena Dementieva | 6–3, 6–2 |
| Win | 4–0 | Jun 2008 | Eastbourne International, UK | Tier II | Grass | (Russia) Nadia Petrova | 6–4, 6–7^{(11–13)}, 6–4 |
| Loss | 4–1 | Oct 2009 | China Open, China | Premier M | Hard | (Russia) Svetlana Kuznetsova | 2–6, 4–6 |
| Loss | 4–2 | Aug 2010 | Southern California Open, US | Premier | Hard | (Russia) Svetlana Kuznetsova | 4–6, 7–6^{(9–7)}, 3–6 |
| Win | 5–2 | Aug 2011 | Southern California Open, US | Premier | Hard | (Russia) Vera Zvonareva | 6–3, 6–4 |
| Win | 6–2 | Oct 2011 | Pan Pacific Open, Japan | Premier 5 | Hard | (Russia) Vera Zvonareva | 6–3, 6–2 |
| Win | 7–2 | Oct 2011 | China Open | Premier M | Hard | (Germany) Andrea Petkovic | 7–5, 0–6, 6–4 |
| Win | 8–2 | Feb 2012 | Dubai Championships, UAE | Premier | Hard | (Germany) Julia Görges | 7–5, 6–4 |
| Win | 9–2 | Mar 2012 | Miami Open, US | Premier M | Hard | (Russia) Maria Sharapova | 7–5, 6–4 |
| Win | 10–2 | May 2012 | Brussels Open, Belgium | Premier | Clay | (Romania) Simona Halep | 7–5, 6–0 |
| Loss | 10–3 | Jul 2012 | Wimbledon, UK | Grand Slam | Grass | (United States) Serena Williams | 1–6, 7–5, 2–6 |
| Loss | 10–4 | Sep 2012 | Pan Pacific Open, Japan | Premier 5 | Hard | (Russia) Nadia Petrova | 0–6, 6–1, 3–6 |
| Win | 11–4 | Jan 2013 | Auckland Open, New Zealand | International | Hard | (Belgium) Yanina Wickmayer | 6–4, 6–4 |
| Win | 12–4 | Jan 2013 | Sydney International, Australia | Premier | Hard | (Slovakia) Dominika Cibulková | 6–0, 6–0 |
| Loss | 12–5 | Jul 2013 | Stanford Classic, US | Premier | Hard | (Slovakia) Dominika Cibulková | 6–3, 4–6, 4–6 |
| Win | 13–5 | Sep 2013 | Korea Open, South Korea | International | Hard | (Russia) Anastasia Pavlyuchenkova | 6–7^{(6–8)}, 6–3, 6–4 |
| Loss | 13–6 | Mar 2014 | Indian Wells Open, US | Premier M | Hard | (Italy) Flavia Pennetta | 2–6, 1–6 |
| Win | 14–6 | Aug 2014 | Rogers Cup, Canada | Premier 5 | Hard | (United States) Venus Williams | 6–4, 6–2 |
| Loss | 14–7 | Jun 2015 | Eastbourne International, UK | Premier | Grass | (Switzerland) Belinda Bencic | 4–6, 6–4, 0–6 |
| Win | 15–7 | Sep 2015 | Pan Pacific Open, Japan (2) | Premier | Hard | (Switzerland) Belinda Bencic | 6–2, 6–2 |
| Win | 16–7 | Oct 2015 | Tianjin Open, China | International | Hard | (Montenegro) Danka Kovinić | 6–1, 6–2 |
| Win | 17–7 | Nov 2015 | WTA Finals, Singapore | WTA Finals | Hard (i) | (Czech Republic) Petra Kvitová | 6–2, 4–6, 6–3 |
| Win | 18–7 | Jan 2016 | Shenzhen Open, China | International | Hard | (United States) Alison Riske | 6–3, 6–2 |
| Win | 19–7 | Aug 2016 | Connecticut Open, US | Premier | Hard | (Ukraine) Elina Svitolina | 6–1, 7–6^{(7–3)} |
| Win | 20–7 | Oct 2016 | China Open, China (2) | Premier M | Hard | (United Kingdom) Johanna Konta | 6–4, 6–2 |
| Loss | 20–8 | Jan 2017 | Sydney International, Australia | Premier | Hard | (United Kingdom) Johanna Konta | 4–6, 2–6 |

=== Doubles: 4 (2 titles, 2 runner-ups) ===
| Legend Grand Slam (–) WTA Finals Premier M & Premier 5 (1–1) Premier (0–1) International (1–0) | Finals by surface Hard (1–2) Grass (–) Clay (1–0) Carpet (–) |

| Result | W–L | Date | Tournament | Tier | Surface | Partner | Opponents | Score |
|---|---|---|---|---|---|---|---|---|
| Win | 1–0 | May 2007 | İstanbul Cup, Turkey | Tier III | Clay | (Poland) Urszula Radwańska | (Chinese Taipei) Chan Yung-jan; (India) Sania Mirza | 6–1, 6–3 |
| Loss | 1–1 | Feb 2009 | Dubai Championships, UAE | Premier 5 | Hard | (Russia) Maria Kirilenko | (Zimbabwe) Cara Black; (United States) Liezel Huber | 3–6, 3–6 |
| Loss | 1–2 | Aug 2009 | LA Championships, US | Premier | Hard | (Russia) Maria Kirilenko | (Chinese Taipei) Chuang Chia-jung; (China) Yan Zi | 0–6, 6–4, [7–10] |
| Win | 2–2 | Apr 2011 | Miami Open, US | Premier M | Hard | (Slovakia) Daniela Hantuchová | (United States) Liezel Huber (Russia) Nadia Petrova | 7–6^{(7–5)}, 2–6, [10–8] |

=== Team competition: 2 (1 win) ===
| Result | Date | Team competition | Surface | Partner/team | Opponents | Score |
|---|---|---|---|---|---|---|
| Loss | Jan 2014 | Hopman Cup, Australia | Hard | (Poland) Grzegorz Panfil | (France) Alizé Cornet; (France) Jo-Wilfried Tsonga | 1–2 |
| Win | Jan 2015 | Hopman Cup. Australia | Hard | (Poland) Jerzy Janowicz | (United States) Serena Williams; (United States) John Isner | 2–1 |

== ITF Circuit finals ==
Since Radwańska professional debut in April 2005 she won 2 ITF Titles in singles performance and she was 3 times runners up. She also reached 5 ITF doubles finals and she won 2 of them.

=== Singles: 5 (2 titles, 3 runner-ups) ===
Legend
$100,000 tournaments
$80,000 tournaments
$60,000 tournaments
$25,000 tournaments
$10,000 tournaments

| Result | W–L | Date | Tournament | Tier | Surface | Opponent | Score |
|---|---|---|---|---|---|---|---|
| Win | 1–0 | Jun 2005 | ITF Warsaw, Poland | 10,000 | Clay | (Ukraine) Oksana Teplyakova | 6–1, 6–3 |
| Loss | 1–1 | Aug 2005 | ITF Gdynia, Poland | 10,000 | Clay | (Czech Republic) Petra Cetkovská | 3–6, 4–6 |
| Loss | 1–2 | Nov 2005 | ITF Minsk, Belarus | 25,000 | Carpet | (Ukraine) Yuliya Beygelzimer | 6–7^{(1–7)}, 1–6 |
| Loss | 1–3 | Nov 2005 | ITF Průhonice, Czech Republic | 25,000 | Hard | (Czech Republic) Lucie Hradecká | 6–4, 1–6, 6–7^{(8–10)} |
| Win | 2–3 | Jul 2007 | ITF Biella, Italy | 100,000 | Clay | (Italy) Karin Knapp | 6–3, 6–3 |

=== Doubles: 5 (2 titles, 3 runner-ups) ===
Legend
$100,000 tournaments
$80,000 tournaments
$60,000 tournaments
$25,000 tournaments
$10,000 tournaments

| Result | W–L | Date | Tournament | Tier | Surface | Partner | Opponent | Score |
|---|---|---|---|---|---|---|---|---|
| Win | 1–0 | Aug 2005 | ITF Gdynia, Poland | 10,000 | Clay | (Poland) Urszula Radwańska | (Ukraine) Kateryna Avidyenko; (Ukraine) Natalia Bogdanova | 6–1, 6–1 |
| Win | 2–0 | Aug 2005 | ITF Kędzierzyn-Koźle, Poland | 25,000 | Clay | (Poland) Urszula Radwańska | (Czech Republic) Renata Voráčová; (Czech Republic) Sandra Záhlavová | 6–1, 6–4 |
| Loss | 2–1 | Oct 2005 | ITF Istanbul, Turkey | 25,000 | Hard | (Poland) Urszula Radwańska | (Ukraine) Mariya Koryttseva; (Hungary) Zsofia Gubasci | 3–6, 3–6 |
| Loss | 2–2 | Nov 2005 | ITF Minsk, Belarus | 25,000 | Carpet | (Poland) Urszula Radwańska | (Belarus) Ekaterina Dzehalevich; (Belarus) Darya Kustova | 3–6, 3–6 |
| Loss | 2–3 | Apr 2006 | ITF Dinan, France | 75,000 (Note: The $75,000 ITF tournaments were reclassified as $75,000 in 2017.) | Clay | (Romania) Mădălina Gojnea | (Poland) Klaudia Jans; (Slovakia) Henrieta Nagyová | 6–3, 2–6, 4–6 |

== ITF junior results ==
=== Singles: 10 (7 titles, 3 runner-ups) ===
Legend
Category GA (2–0)
Category G1 (1–1)
Category G2 (2–0)
Category G3 (0–1)
Category G4 (2–1)
Category G5 (0–0)

| Result | W–L | Date | Tournament | Tier | Surface | Opponent | Score |
|---|---|---|---|---|---|---|---|
| Loss | 0–1 | Aug 2003 | Mostostal Trophy, Poland | G4 | Clay | (Slovakia) Magdaléna Rybáriková | 6–4, 6–4 |
| Win | 1–1 | Jun 2004 | Prokom Cup, Poland | G4 | Clay | (United Kingdom) Maria Spenceley | 7–5, 7–5 |
| Win | 2–1 | Aug 2004 | International Championships of Silesia, Poland | G4 | Clay | (Poland) Urszula Radwańska | 6–4, 6–4 |
| Win | 3–1 | Jan 2005 | Indoor Tournament, Slovakia | G2 | Carpet | (Poland) Urszula Radwańska | 6–2, 7–6^{(7–1)} |
| Loss | 3–2 | Jan 2005 | International Indoor Championships, Czech Republic | G1 | Carpet | (Russia) Anastasia Pavlyuchenkova | 6–3, 6–4 |
| Loss | 3–3 | Jun 2005 | Gerry Weber Open, Germany | G3 | Grass | (New Zealand) Marina Erakovic | 6–3, 3–6, 6–4 |
| Win | 4–3 | Jul 2005 | Wimbledon, United Kingdom | GA | Grass | (Austria) Tamira Paszek | 6–3, 6–4 |
| Win | 5–3 | Jul 2005 | Sportastic Open Wels, Austria | G1 | Clay | (Poland) Urszula Radwańska | 6–2, 6–3 |
| Win | 6–3 | Jun 2006 | French Open | GA | Clay | (Russia) Anastasia Pavlyuchenkova | 6–4, 6–1 |
| Win | 7–3 | Jun 2006 | Gerry Weber Open, Germany | G2 | Grass | (Czech Republic) Kateřina Kramperová | 6–3, 6–1 |

=== Doubles: 12 (11 titles, 1 runner-up) ===
Legend
Category GA (0–1)
Category G1 (2–0)
Category G2 (4–0)
Category G3 (1–0)
Category G4 (3–0)
Category G5 (0–0)

| Result | W–L | Date | Tournament | Tier | Surface | Partner | Opponent | Score |
|---|---|---|---|---|---|---|---|---|
| Win | 1–0 | Jan 2004 | Bergheim, Austria | G4 | Carpet | (Poland) Urszula Radwańska | (Germany) Tatjana Malek; (Germany) Miriam Steinhilber | 6–4, 6–0 |
| Win | 2–0 | Jun 2004 | Gdynia, Poland | G4 | Clay | (Poland) Urszula Radwańska | (Latvia) Ieva Irbe; (United Kingdom) Maria Spenceley | 6–2, 6–2 |
| Win | 3–0 | Aug 2004 | Zabrze, Poland | G4 | Clay | (Poland) Urszula Radwańska | (Belarus) Alena Bayarchyk; (Belarus) Katsarina Zheltova | 6–1, 6–4 |
| Win | 4–0 | Sep 2004 | Prague, Czech Republic | G2 | Clay | (Poland) Urszula Radwańska | (Czech Republic) Gabriela Bergmannová; (Czech Republic) Eva Kadlecová | 3–6, 6–0, 7–5 |
| Win | 5–0 | Jan 2005 | Bratislava, Slovakia | G2 | Carpet | (Poland) Urszula Radwańska | (Belgium) Claudia Smolders; (Belgium) Aude Vermoezen | 6–1, 6–0 |
| Win | 6–0 | Mar 2005 | Nürnberg, Germany | G2 | Carpet | (Poland) Urszula Radwańska | (Russia) Ekaterina Makarova; (Russia) Evgeniya Rodina | 6–4, 7–6^{(7–2)} |
| Win | 7–0 | May 2005 | Sankt Pölten, Austria | G2 | Clay | (Poland) Urszula Radwańska | (Czech Republic) Kateřina Kramperová; (Austria) Tamira Paszek | 6–1, 6–2 |
| Win | 8–0 | Jun 2005 | Halle, Germany | G3 | Grass | (Poland) Urszula Radwańska | (Germany) Julia Görges; (Georgia (country)) Ia Jikia | 6–4, 6–2 |
| Win | 9–0 | Jul 2005 | Wels, Austria | G1 | Clay | (Poland) Urszula Radwańska | (Netherlands) Marrit Boonstra; (Netherlands) Renée Reinhard | 7–5, 6–2 |
| Win | 10–0 | Dec 2005 | Mérida, Mexico | G1 | Clay | (Serbia and Montenegro) Nataša Zorić | (Netherlands) Bibiane Schoofs; (Denmark) Caroline Wozniacki | 4–0, 5–4^{(6–4)} |
| Loss | 10–1 | Jun 2006 | French Open | GA | Clay | (Denmark) Caroline Wozniacki | (Canada) Sharon Fichman; (Russia) Anastasia Pavlyuchenkova | 7–6^{(7–4)}, 2–6, 1–6 |
| Win | 11–1 | Jun 2006 | Halle, Germany | G2 | Grass | (Romania) Alexandra Dulgheru | (New Zealand) Sacha Jones; (Belgium) Yanina Wickmayer | 6–2, 7–5 |

== WTA Tour career earnings ==
Radwańska earned more than 27 million dollars during her career.

| Year | Grand Slam titles (Note: Includes singles, doubles and mixed doubles titles.) | WTA titles | Total titles | Earnings ($) | Money list rank |
|---|---|---|---|---|---|
| 2006 | 0 | 0 | 0 | 151,819 | 96 |
| 2007 | 0 | 2 | 2 | 400,823 | 40 |
| 2008 | 0 | 3 | 3 | 1,170,072 | 10 |
| 2009 | 0 | 0 | 0 | 1,614,464 | 11 |
| 2010 | 0 | 0 | 0 | 1,144,750 | 16 |
| 2011 | 0 | 4 | 4 | 2,456,568 | 8 |
| 2012 | 0 | 3 | 3 | 4,101,542 | 4 |
| 2013 | 0 | 3 | 3 | 3,118,332 | 5 |
| 2014 | 0 | 1 | 1 | 3,195,411 | 8 |
| 2015 | 0 | 3 | 3 | 4,412,293 | 4 |
| 2016 | 0 | 3 | 3 | 4,162,193 | 4 |
| 2017 | 0 | 0 | 0 | 1,259,379 | 29 |
| 2018 | 0 | 0 | 0 | 484,522 | 77 |
| Career | 0 | 20 | 20 | 27,683,807 | 9 |

== Career Grand Slam statistics ==
=== Grand Slam tournament seedings ===
| Year | Australian Open | French Open | Wimbledon | US Open |
|---|---|---|---|---|
| 2006 | did not play | did not play | wildcard | not seeded |
| 2007 | not seeded | not seeded | not seeded | 30th |
| 2008 | 29th | 14th | 14th | 9th |
| 2009 | 9th | 12th | 11th | 12th |
| 2010 | 10th | 8th | 7th | 9th |
| 2011 | 12th | 12th | 13th | 12th |
| 2012 | 8th | 3rd | 3rd | 2nd |
| 2013 | 4th | 4th | 4th | 3rd |
| 2014 | 5th | 3rd | 4th | 4th |
| 2015 | 6th | 14th | 13th | 15th |
| 2016 | 4th | 2nd | 3rd | 4th |
| 2017 | 3rd | 9th | 9th | 10th |
| 2018 | 26th | did not play | 32nd | not seeded |

=== Best Grand Slam tournament results details ===
Australian Open
2014 Australian Open (5th seed)
| Round | Opponent | Score |
|---|---|---|
| 1R | (Kazakhstan) Yulia Putintseva | 6–0, 5–7, 6–2 |
| 2R | (Belarus) Olga Govortsova | 6–0, 7–5 |
| 3R | (Russia) Anastasia Pavlyuchenkova (29) | 5–7, 6–2, 6–2 |
| 4R | (Spain) Garbiñe Muguruza | 6–1, 6–3 |
| QF | (Belarus) Victoria Azarenka (2) | 6–1, 5–7, 6–0 |
| SF | (Slovakia) Dominika Cibulková (20) | 1–6, 2–6 |
2016 Australian Open (4th seed)
| Round | Opponent | Score |
| 1R | (United States) Christina McHale | 6–2, 6–3 |
| 2R | (Canada) Eugenie Bouchard | 6–4, 6–2 |
| 3R | (Puerto Rico) Monica Puig | 6–4, 6–0 |
| 4R | (Germany) Anna-Lena Friedsam | 6–7^{(6–8)}, 6–1, 7–5 |
| QF | (Spain) Carla Suárez Navarro (10) | 6–1, 6–3 |
| SF | (United States) Serena Williams (1) | 0–6, 4–6 |

Wimbledon Championships
2012 Wimbledon (3rd seed)
| Round | Opponent | Score |
|---|---|---|
| 1R | (Slovakia) Magdaléna Rybáriková | 6–3, 6–3 |
| 2R | (Russia) Elena Vesnina | 6–2, 6–1 |
| 3R | (United Kingdom) Heather Watson | 6–0, 6–2 |
| 4R | (Italy) Camila Giorgi (Q) | 6–2, 6–3 |
| QF | (Russia) Maria Kirilenko (17) | 7–5, 4–6, 7–5 |
| SF | (Germany) Angelique Kerber (8) | 6–3, 6–4 |
| F | (United States) Serena Williams (6) | 1–6, 7–5, 2–6 |

French Open
2013 French Open (4th seed)
| Round | Opponent | Score |
|---|---|---|
| 1R | (Israel) Shahar Pe'er | 6–1, 6–1 |
| 2R | (United States) Mallory Burdette | 6–3, 6–2 |
| 3R | (Germany) Dinah Pfizenmaier (Q) | 6–3, 6–4 |
| 4R | (Serbia) Ana Ivanovic (14) | 6–2, 6–4 |
| QF | (Italy) Sara Errani (5) | 4–6, 6–7^{(6–8)} |

US Open
2007 US Open (30th seed)
| Round | Opponent | Score |
|---|---|---|
| 1R | (Japan) Akiko Morigami | 6–2, 6–1 |
| 2R | (France) Virginie Razzano | 6–2, 6–3 |
| 3R | (Russia) Maria Sharapova (2) | 6–4, 1–6, 6–2 |
| 4R | (Israel) Shahar Pe'er (18) | 4–6, 1–6 |
2008 US Open (9th seed)
| Round | Opponent | Score |
| 1R | (Kazakhstan) Yaroslava Shvedova (Q) | 6–4, 6–2 |
| 2R | (Colombia) Mariana Duque Mariño (LL) | 6–0, 7–6^{(7–3)} |
| 3R | (Slovakia) Dominika Cibulková (18) | 6–0, 6–3 |
| 4R | (United States) Venus Williams (7) | 1–6, 3–6 |
2012 US Open (2nd seed)
| Round | Opponent | Score |
| 1R | (Russia) Nina Bratchikova | 6–1, 6–1 |
| 2R | (Spain) Carla Suárez Navarro | 4–6, 6–3, 6–0 |
| 3R | (Serbia) Jelena Janković (30) | 6–3, 7–5 |
| 4R | (Italy) Roberta Vinci (20) | 1–6, 4–6 |
2013 US Open (3rd seed)
| Round | Opponent | Score |
| 1R | (Spain) Sílvia Soler Espinosa | 6–1, 6–2 |
| 2R | (Spain) María Teresa Torró Flor | 6–0, 7–5 |
| 3R | (Russia) Anastasia Pavlyuchenkova (32) | 6–4, 7–6^{(7–1)} |
| 4R | (Russia) Ekaterina Makarova (24) | 4–6, 4–6 |
2016 US Open (4th seed)
| Round | Opponent | Score |
| 1R | (United States) Jessica Pegula (Q) | 6–1, 6–1 |
| 2R | (United Kingdom) Naomi Broady | 7–6^{(11–9)}, 6-3 |
| 3R | (France) Caroline Garcia (25) | 6–2, 6–3 |
| 4R | (Croatia) Ana Konjuh | 4–6, 4–6 |

== Record against top 10 players ==
Radwańska's match record against players who have been ranked in the top 10 (as of 29 October 2022). Active players are in boldface:

| **Player** | **Record** | **W%** | **Hard** | **Clay** | **Grass** | **Carpet** | **Last match** |
| **Number 1 ranked players** | | | | | | | |
| (Switzerland) Martina Hingis | 2–0 | 100% | 2–0 | – | – | – | Won (6–4, 6–0) at 2015 Fed Cup World Group play-offs |
| **(Czech Republic) Karolína Plíšková** | 7–1 | 88% | 4–1 | 2–0 | 1–0 | – | Lost (3–6, 3–6) at 2018 Western & Southern Open |
| (Serbia and Montenegro) / (Serbia) Jelena Janković | 8–3 | 72% | 6–0 | 0–2 | 2–0 | 0–1 | Won (7–6^{(7–3)}, 6–0) at 2017 Wimbledon |
| (Serbia and Montenegro) / (Serbia) Ana Ivanovic | 7–3 | 70% | 4–3 | 3–0 | – | – | Won (6–2, 6–4) at 2013 French Open |
| **(Romania) Simona Halep** | 6–5 | 55% | 5–4 | 1–1 | – | – | Won (3–6, 6–2, 6–3) at 2018 Miami Open |
| **(Germany) Angelique Kerber** | 6–6 | 50% | 4–6 | 1–0 | 1–0 | – | Lost (2–6, 1–6) at 2016 WTA Finals |
| **(Spain) Garbiñe Muguruza** | 4–4 | 50% | 4–3 | – | 0–1 | – | Won (7–6^{(7–1)}, 6–3) at 2016 WTA Finals |
| (Denmark) Caroline Wozniacki | 6–11 | 35% | 6–9 | 0–2 | – | – | Lost (3–6, 1–6) at 2017 Canadian Open |
| **(United States) Venus Williams** | 4–8 | 33% | 3–6 | 1–1 | 0–1 | – | Lost (1–6, 6–7^{(4–7)}) at 2015 Wuhan |
| (Russia) Dinara Safina | 1–2 | 33% | 1–1 | 0–1 | – | – | Won (6–4, 6–3) at 2010 San Diego |
| **(Belarus) Victoria Azarenka** | 5–13 | 28% | 4–10 | 0–2 | 1–1 | – | Lost (2–6, 2–6) at 2018 Miami Open |
| (Russia) Maria Sharapova | 2–13 | 13% | 2–9 | 0–4 | – | – | Lost (4–6, 6–3, 6–4) at 2015 WTA Finals |
| (Australia) Ashleigh Barty | 0–1 | 0% | 0–1 | – | – | – | Lost (6–4, 0–6, 4–6) at 2017 Wuhan |
| **(Japan) Naomi Osaka** | 0–1 | 0% | 0–1 | – | – | – | Lost (3–6, 2–6) at 2018 Indian Wells |
| (Belgium) Kim Clijsters | 0–2 | 0% | 0–1 | – | 0–1 | – | Lost (3–6, 6–7^{(4–7)}) at 2011 Australian Open |
| (Belgium) Justine Henin | 0–2 | 0% | – | – | 0–1 | 0–1 | Lost (4–6, 2–6) at 2007 Zurich |
| (France) Amélie Mauresmo | 0–2 | 0% | 0–1 | 0–1 | – | – | Lost (2–6, 0–6) at 2009 Paris |
| (United States) Serena Williams | 0–10 | 0% | 0–7 | 0–1 | 0–2 | – | Lost (4–6, 6–7^{(1–7)}) at 2016 Indian Wells |
| Number 2 ranked players | | | | | | | |
| (Russia) Anastasia Myskina | 1–0 | 100% | – | 1–0 | – | – | Won (6–4, 4–6, 6–4) at 2006 Warsaw |
| **(Russia) Vera Zvonareva** | 4–2 | 67% | 4–1 | – | – | 0–1 | Won (1–6, 6–2, 7–5) at 2011 WTA Tour Championships |
| (China) Li Na | 5–6 | 45% | 1–5 | 1–0 | 3–1 | – | Won (7–6^{(7–5)}, 4–6, 6–2) at 2013 Wimbledon |
| **(Czech Republic) Petra Kvitová** | 5–8 | 38% | 5–7 | – | 0–1 | – | Lost (1–6, 6–7^{(3–7)}) at 2018 New Haven |
| **(Russia) Svetlana Kuznetsova** | 4–14 | 22% | 2–10 | 1–2 | 1–2 | – | Lost (2–6, 4–6) at 2017 Wimbledon |
| **(Belarus) Aryna Sabalenka** | 0–1 | 0% | – | – | 0–1 | – | Lost (3–6, 6–1, 3–6) at 2018 Eastbourne |
| Number 3 ranked players | | | | | | | |
| **(United States) Sloane Stephens** | 4–0 | 100% | 3–0 | – | 1–0 | – | Won (6–1, 6–7^{(3–7)}, 6–2) at 2015 Eastbourne |
| **(Ukraine) Elina Svitolina** | 4–0 | 100% | 4–0 | – | – | – | Won (7–6^{(7–3)}, 6–3) at 2016 Beijing |
| **(United States) Jessica Pegula** | 1–0 | 100% | 1–0 | – | – | – | Won (6–1, 6–1) at 2016 US Open |
| (Russia) Elena Dementieva | 4–2 | 67% | 3–1 | 1–1 | – | – | Won (6–4, 6–3) at 2010 Indian Wells |
| (Russia) Nadia Petrova | 3–2 | 60% | 2–2 | – | 1–0 | – | Lost (0–6, 6–1, 3–6) at 2012 Tokyo |
| Number 4 ranked players | | | | | | | |
| (Japan) Kimiko Date-Krumm | 2–0 | 100% | 2–0 | – | – | – | Won (6–4, 6–3) at 2013 Sydney |
| **(France) Caroline Garcia** | 4–1 | 80% | 2–1 | 2–0 | – | – | Won (6–3, 6–2) at 2016 US Open |
| (United Kingdom) Johanna Konta | 3–1 | 75% | 3–1 | – | – | – | Won (6–3, 7–5) at 2018 Sydney |
| (Italy) Francesca Schiavone | 6–4 | 60% | 3–4 | 2–0 | 1–0 | – | Won (6–4, 6–1) at 2014 Rome |
| (Slovakia) Dominika Cibulková | 7–6 | 54% | 6–3 | 1–1 | 0–2 | – | Lost (3–6, 7–5, 7–9) at 2016 Wimbledon |
| **(Switzerland) Belinda Bencic** | 1–1 | 50% | 1–0 | – | 0–1 | – | Won (6–2, 6–2) at 2015 Tokyo |
| (Australia) Samantha Stosur | 1–4 | 20% | 1–3 | 0–1 | – | – | Lost (6–3, 4–6, 0–6) at 2017 Hong Kong |
| Number 5 ranked players | | | | | | | |
| **(Canada) Eugenie Bouchard** | 4–0 | 100% | 2–0 | 1–0 | 1–0 | – | Won (6–3, 7–5) at 2017 Connecticut Open |
| **(Latvia) Jeļena Ostapenko** | 2–0 | 100% | 1–0 | – | 1–0 | – | Won (6–2, 7–5) at 2018 Eastbourne |
| (Slovakia) Daniela Hantuchová | 6–2 | 75% | 5–2 | – | – | 1–0 | Won (6–3, 6–3) at 2013 Carlsbad |
| **(Italy) Sara Errani** | 7–3 | 70% | 3–0 | 3–3 | 1–0 | – | Lost (6–7^{(8–10)}, 4–6) at 2015 Porsche Tennis Grand Prix |
| (Russia) Anna Chakvetadze | 2–2 | 50% | 2–1 | 0–1 | – | – | Won (6–2, 5–3 ret.) at 2010 Indian Wells |
| (Czech Republic) Lucie Šafářová | 1–5 | 17% | 1–3 | 0–1 | 0–1 | – | Lost (5–7, 4–6) at 2018 Wimbledon |
| Number 6 ranked players | | | | | | | |
| (Spain) Carla Suárez Navarro | 3–2 | 60% | 3–2 | – | – | – | Lost (2–6, 0–6) at 2016 Qatar Total Open |
| (Italy) Flavia Pennetta | 5–4 | 55% | 4–4 | 1–0 | – | – | Lost (7–6^{(7–5)}, 6–4) at 2015 WTA Finals |
| Number 7 ranked players | | | | | | | |
| (France) Marion Bartoli | 7–0 | 100% | 6–0 | – | 1–0 | – | Won (6–4, 6–2) at 2012 Miami |
| **(United States) Madison Keys** | 5–1 | 83% | 3–1 | – | 2–0 | – | Won (6–3, 0–0 ret.) at 2015 China Open |
| (Italy) Roberta Vinci | 8–2 | 80% | 3–2 | 5–0 | – | – | Won (3–6, 6–2, 6–3) at 2016 Doha |
| (Switzerland) Patty Schnyder | 1–2 | 33% | 1–0 | 0–2 | – | – | Lost (6–3, 4–6, 4–6) at 2010 Madrid |
| Number 8 ranked players | | | | | | | |
| (Japan) Ai Sugiyama | 3–0 | 100% | 3–0 | – | – | – | Won (6–2, 6–1) at 2009 Cincinnati |
| (Russia) Ekaterina Makarova | 6–3 | 67% | 6–1 | 0–1 | 0–1 | – | Lost (2–6, 4–6) at 2017 Stuttgart |
| (Australia) Alicia Molik | 0–1 | 0% | 0–1 | – | – | – | Lost (6–3, 4–6, 4–6) at 2007 Linz |
| **(Russia) Daria Kasatkina** | 0–2 | 0% | 0–2 | – | – | – | Lost (5–7, 4–6) at 2018 Dubai |
| Number 9 ranked players | | | | | | | |
| (Germany) Andrea Petkovic | 8–0 | 100% | 7–0 | 1–0 | – | – | Won (6–0, 6–1) at 2016 Western & Southern Open |
| (Netherlands) Brenda Schultz-McCarthy | 1–0 | 100% | 1–0 | – | – | – | Won (6–2, 6–2) at 2006 Luxembourg Open |
| **(United States) CoCo Vandeweghe** | 5–2 | 71% | 5–1 | – | 0–1 | – | Lost (5–7, 6–4, 4–6) at 2017 US Open |
| (Germany) Julia Görges | 4–2 | 67% | 4–1 | – | 0–1 | – | Won (7–5, 7–5) at 2017 Wuhan |
| (Switzerland) Timea Bacsinszky | 1–2 | 33% | 0–2 | – | 1–0 | – | Won (3–6, 6–4, 6–1) at 2017 Wimbledon |
| Number 10 ranked players | | | | | | | |
| (Russia) Maria Kirilenko | 6–3 | 67% | 3–3 | 1–0 | 1–0 | 1–0 | Lost (1–6, 6–4, 5–7) at 2013 Indian Wells |
| **Total** | **202–177** | **53%** | **151–127 (54%)** | **29–28 (51%)** | **20–19 (51%)** | **2–3 (40%)** | |

=== Top 10 wins ===
| **Season** | **2006** | **2007** | **2008** | **2009** | **2010** | **2011** | **2012** | **2013** | **2014** | **2015** | **2016** | **2017** | **2018** | **Total** |
| Wins | 1 | 3 | 4 | 3 | 1 | 9 | 9 | 5 | 4 | 4 | 4 | 0 | 2 | **49** |

| # | Player | Rank | Event | Surface | Rd | Score | ARR |
|---|---|---|---|---|---|---|---|
**2006**
| 1. | (Russia) Elena Dementieva | No. 6 | Luxembourg Open, Luxembourg | Hard (i) | QF | 7–5, 6–2 | No. 95 |
**2007**
| 2. | (Switzerland) Martina Hingis | No. 6 | Miami Open, United States | Hard | 3R | 4–6, 6–3, 6–2 | No. 49 |
| 3. | (Russia) Maria Sharapova | No. 2 | US Open, United States | Hard | 3R | 6–4, 1–6, 6–2 | No. 32 |
| 4. | (Slovakia) Daniela Hantuchová | No. 9 | Zurich Open, Switzerland | Hard (i) | 2R | 6–3, 6–3 | No. 31 |
**2008**
| 5. | (Russia) Svetlana Kuznetsova | No. 2 | Australian Open, Australia | Hard | 3R | 6–3, 6–4 | No. 28 |
| 6. | (Russia) Elena Dementieva | No. 7 | İstanbul Cup, Turkey | Clay | F | 6–3, 6–2 | No. 15 |
| 7. | (Russia) Svetlana Kuznetsova | No. 4 | Wimbledon, United Kingdom | Grass | 4R | 6–4, 1–6, 7–5 | No. 11 |
| 8. | (Russia) Svetlana Kuznetsova | No. 7 | WTA Tour Championships, Qatar | Hard | RR | 6–2, 7–5 | No. 10 |
**2009**
| 9. | (Serbia) Ana Ivanovic | No. 7 | Italian Open, Italy | Clay | 3R | 6–1, 3–6, 6–4 | No. 12 |
| 10. | (Russia) Elena Dementieva | No. 4 | China Open, China | Hard | QF | 7–5, 6–3 | No. 11 |
| 11. | (Belarus) Victoria Azarenka | No. 6 | WTA Tour Championships, Qatar | Hard | RR | 4–6, 7–5, 4–1 ret. | No. 10 |
**2010**
| 12. | (Russia) Elena Dementieva | No. 7 | Indian Wells Open, United States | Hard | QF | 6–4, 6–3 | No. 8 |
**2011**
| 13. | (Italy) Francesca Schiavone | No. 4 | Miami Open, United States | Hard | 4R | 6–0, 6–2 | No. 14 |
| 14. | (Italy) Francesca Schiavone | No. 4 | Stuttgart Open, Germany | Clay (i) | 2R | 6–1, 6–3 | No. 14 |
| 15. | (Italy) Francesca Schiavone | No. 7 | Eastbourne International, United Kingdom | Grass | 2R | 6–3, 6–2 | No. 13 |
| 16. | (Russia) Vera Zvonareva | No. 3 | Southern California Open, United States | Hard | F | 6–3, 6–4 | No. 13 |
| 17. | (Russia) Vera Zvonareva | No. 3 | Rogers Cup, Canada | Hard | 3R | 6–4, 7–6^{(7–4)} | No. 12 |
| 18. | (Germany) Andrea Petkovic | No. 10 | Rogers Cup, Canada | Hard | QF | 6–4, 6–3 | No. 12 |
| 19. | (Belarus) Victoria Azarenka | No. 3 | Pan Pacific Open, Japan | Hard | SF | 6–3, 4–6, 6–2 | No. 13 |
| 20. | (Russia) Vera Zvonareva | No. 4 | Pan Pacific Open, Japan | Hard | F | 6–3, 6–2 | No. 13 |
| 21. | (Russia) Vera Zvonareva | No. 6 | WTA Tour Championships, Turkey | Hard (i) | RR | 1–6, 6–2, 7–5 | No. 8 |
**2012**
| 22. | (Germany) Andrea Petkovic | No. 10 | Sydney International, Australia | Hard | 2R | 7–5, 6–4 | No. 8 |
| 23. | (Denmark) Caroline Wozniacki | **No. 1** | Sydney International, Australia | Hard | QF | 3–6, 7–5, 6–2 | No. 8 |
| 24. | (France) Marion Bartoli | No. 7 | Miami Open, United States | Hard | SF | 6–4, 6–2 | No. 4 |
| 25. | (Russia) Maria Sharapova | No. 2 | Miami Open, United States | Hard | F | 7–5, 6–4 | No. 4 |
| 26. | (China) Li Na | No. 8 | Stuttgart Open, Germany | Clay (i) | QF | 3–6, 6–2, 6–3 | No. 4 |
| 27. | (Germany) Angelique Kerber | No. 8 | Wimbledon, United Kingdom | Grass | SF | 6–3, 6–4 | No. 3 |
| 28. | (Germany) Angelique Kerber | No. 6 | Pan Pacific Open, Japan | Hard | SF | 6–1, 6–1 | No. 3 |
| 29. | (Czech Republic) Petra Kvitová | No. 6 | WTA Tour Championships, Turkey | Hard (i) | RR | 6–3, 6–2 | No. 4 |
| 30. | (Italy) Sara Errani | No. 7 | WTA Tour Championships, Turkey | Hard (i) | RR | 6–7^{(6–8)}, 7–5, 6–4 | No. 4 |
**2013**
| 31. | (China) Li Na | No. 7 | Sydney International, Australia | Hard | SF | 6–3, 6–4 | No. 4 |
| 32. | (Denmark) Caroline Wozniacki | No. 10 | Qatar Ladies Open, Qatar | Hard | QF | 6–2, 7–5 | No. 4 |
| 33. | (China) Li Na | No. 6 | Wimbledon, United Kingdom | Grass | QF | 7–6^{(7–5)}, 4–6, 6–2 | No. 4 |
| 34. | (Italy) Sara Errani | No. 6 | Rogers Cup, Canada | Hard | QF | 7–6^{(7–1)}, 7–5 | No. 4 |
| 35. | (Germany) Angelique Kerber | No. 9 | China Open, China | Hard | QF | 7–6^{(9–7)}, 6–4 | No. 4 |
**2014**
| 36. | (Belarus) Victoria Azarenka | No. 2 | Australian Open, Australia | Hard | QF | 6–1, 5–7, 6–0 | No. 5 |
| 37. | (Serbia) Jelena Janković | No. 8 | Indian Wells Open, United States | Hard | QF | 7–5, 2–6, 6–4 | No. 3 |
| 38. | (Romania) Simona Halep | No. 7 | Indian Wells Open, United States | Hard | SF | 6–3, 6–4 | No. 3 |
| 39. | (Czech Republic) Petra Kvitová | No. 3 | WTA Finals, Singapore | Hard (i) | RR | 6–2, 6–3 | No. 6 |
**2015**
| 40. | (Germany) Angelique Kerber | No. 10 | China Open, China | Hard | QF | 6–1, 6–4 | No. 8 |
| 41. | (Romania) Simona Halep | No. 2 | WTA Finals Singapore | Hard(i) | RR | 7–6^{(7–5)}, 6–1 | No. 6 |
| 42. | (Spain) Garbiñe Muguruza | No. 3 | WTA Finals, Singapore | Hard(i) | SF | 6–7^{(5–7)}, 6–3, 7–5 | No. 6 |
| 43. | (Czech Republic) Petra Kvitová | No. 5 | WTA Finals, Singapore | Hard(i) | F | 6–2, 4–6, 6–3 | No. 6 |
**2016**
| 44. | (Italy) Roberta Vinci | No. 10 | Qatar Ladies Open, Qatar | Hard | QF | 3–6, 6–2, 6–3 | No. 3 |
| 45. | (Czech Republic) Petra Kvitová | No. 9 | Indian Wells Open, United States | Hard | QF | 6–2, 7–6^{(7–3)} | No. 3 |
| 46. | (Spain) Garbiñe Muguruza | No. 6 | WTA Finals, Singapore | Hard(i) | RR | 7–6^{(7–1)}, 6–3 | No. 3 |
| 47. | (Czech Republic) Karolína Plíšková | No. 5 | WTA Finals, Singapore | Hard(i) | RR | 7–5, 6–3 | No. 3 |
**2018**
| 48. | (United Kingdom) Johanna Konta | No. 9 | Sydney International, Australia | Hard | 1R | 6–3, 7–5 | No. 28 |
| 49. | (Romania) Simona Halep | **No. 1** | Miami Open, United States | Hard | 3R | 3–6, 6–2, 6–3 | No. 32 |

=== Double bagel matches (6–0, 6–0) ===
| Result | W–L | Year | Tournament | Surface | Opponent | Rank | Rd | ARR |
|---|---|---|---|---|---|---|---|---|
| Win | 1–0 | 2008 | Dubai Championships, UAE | Hard | (Czech Republic) Eva Hrdinová | No. 172 | Q2 | No. 19 |
| Win | 2–0 | 2008 | İstanbul Cup, Turkey | Clay | (Romania) Sorana Cîrstea | No. 81 | 2R | No. 15 |
| Win | 3–0 | 2013 | Sydney International, Australia | Hard | (Slovakia) Dominika Cibulková | No. 15 | F | No. 4 |
| Win | 4–0 | 2014 | Indian Wells Open, United States | Hard | (Germany) Annika Beck | No. 48 | 3R | No. 3 |
| Win | 5–0 | 2014 | Korea Open, South Korea | Hard | (South Africa) Chanelle Scheepers | No. 83 | 2R | No. 5 |

== Fed Cup participation ==
This Table is current through the 2014 Fed Cup

Legend
World Group
World Group Play-off
World Group II
World Group II Play-off
Europe/Africa Group

=== Singles: 43 (34–9) ===
| Edition | Round | Date | Location | Against | Surface | Opponent | W/L | Result |
|---|---|---|---|---|---|---|---|---|
| 2006 | Z2 | Apr 2006 | Antalya (TUR) | Portugal | Clay | Magali de Lattre | W | 6–4, 6–1 |
| 2006 | Z2 | Apr 2006 | Antalya (TUR) | Greece | Clay | Anna Koumantou | W | 6–2, 6–1 |
| 2006 | Z2 | Apr 2006 | Antalya (TUR) | Latvia | Clay | Liene Linina | W | 6–2, 6–1 |
| 2006 | Z2 | Apr 2006 | Antalya (TUR) | (Georgia (country)) Georgia | Clay | Margalita Chakhnashvili | W | 6–3, 6–1 |
| 2007 | Z1 | Apr 2007 | Plovdiv (BUL) | Luxembourg | Clay | Anne Kremer | W | 6–2, 6–3 |
| 2007 | Z1 | Apr 2007 | Plovdiv (BUL) | Bulgaria | Clay | Tsvetana Pironkova | W | 6–2, 6–3 |
| 2007 | Z1 | Apr 2007 | Plovdiv (BUL) | (United Kingdom) Great Britain | Clay | Naomi Cavaday | W | 6–2, 6–3 |
| 2007 | Z1 | Apr 2007 | Plovdiv (BUL) | Ukraine | Clay | Alona Bondarenko | W | 6–4, 6–3 |
| 2008 | Z1 | Feb 2008 | Budapest (HUN) | Romania | Carpet (i) | Sorana Cîrstea | L | 4–6, 5–7 |
| 2008 | Z1 | Feb 2008 | Budapest (HUN) | Serbia | Carpet (i) | Jelena Janković | L | 4–6, 7–6^{(7-2)}, 5–7 |
| 2008 | Z1 | Feb 2008 | Budapest (HUN) | (Georgia (country)) Georgia | Carpet (i) | Oksana Kalashnikova | W | 6–4, 6–3 |
| 2009 | Z1 | Feb 2009 | Tallinn (EST) | Romania | Hard (i) | Sorana Cîrstea | W | 6–2, 6–3 |
| 2009 | Z1 | Feb 2009 | Tallinn (EST) | Sweden | Hard (i) | Sofia Arvidsson | W | 6–2, 6–3 |
| 2009 | Z1 | Feb 2009 | Tallinn (EST) | Bosnia and Herzegovina | Hard (i) | Mervana Jugić-Salkić | L | 6–1, 4–6, 6–7^{(5–7)} |
| 2009 | Z1 | Feb 2009 | Tallinn (EST) | (United Kingdom) Great Britain | Hard (i) | Anne Keothavong | W | 7–6^{(7–2)}, 7–6^{(7–4)} |
| 2009 | WG2 PO | Apr 2009 | Gdynia (POL) | Japan | Clay | Akiko Morigami | W | 6–2, 6–1 |
| 2009 | WG2 PO | Apr 2009 | Gdynia (POL) | Japan | Clay | Ai Sugiyama | W | 7–6^{(7–5)}, 6–1 |
| 2010 | WG2 | Feb 2010 | Bydgoszcz (POL) | Belgium | Hard (i) | Kirsten Flipkens | W | 6–2, 7–6^{(7–5)} |
| 2010 | WG2 | Feb 2010 | Bydgoszcz (POL) | Belgium | Hard (i) | Yanina Wickmayer | L | 6–1, 6–7^{(6–8)}, 5–7 |
| 2010 | WG2 PO | Apr 2010 | Sopot (POL) | Spain | Carpet (i) | Carla Suárez Navarro | W | 6–3, 6–1 |
| 2010 | WG2 PO | Apr 2010 | Sopot (POL) | Spain | Carpet (i) | María José Martínez Sánchez | L | 3–6, 4–6 |
| 2011 | Z1 | Feb 2011 | Eilat (ISR) | Bulgaria | Hard | Tsvetana Pironkova | W | 6–2, 6–4 |
| 2011 | Z1 | Feb 2011 | Eilat (ISR) | Israel | Hard | Shahar Pe'er | W | 6–3, 6–3 |
| 2011 | Z1 | Feb 2011 | Eilat (ISR) | Luxembourg | Hard | Mandy Minella | W | 6–1, 6–2 |
| 2011 | Z1 | Feb 2011 | Eilat (ISR) | Belarus | Hard | Victoria Azarenka | L | 5–7, 5–7 |
| 2012 | Z1 | Feb 2012 | Eilat (ISR) | Luxembourg | Hard | Anne Kremer | W | 6–1, 6–1 |
| 2012 | Z1 | Feb 2012 | Eilat (ISR) | Croatia | Hard | Petra Martić | W | 6–0, 6–3 |
| 2012 | Z1 | Feb 2012 | Eilat (ISR) | Romania | Hard | Irina-Camelia Begu | W | 6–1, 6–3 |
| 2012 | Z1 | Feb 2012 | Eilat (ISR) | Sweden | Hard | Johanna Larsson | W | 6–1, 6–0 |
| 2013 | Z1 | Feb 2013 | Eilat (ISR) | Romania | Hard | Sorana Cîrstea | W | 6–3, 6–4 |
| 2013 | Z1 | Feb 2013 | Eilat (ISR) | Turkey | Hard | Çağla Büyükakçay | W | 6–1, 6–2 |
| 2013 | Z1 | Feb 2013 | Eilat (ISR) | Israel | Hard | Shahar Pe'er | W | 6–3, 6–2 |
| 2013 | Z1 | Feb 2013 | Eilat (ISR) | Croatia | Hard | Donna Vekić | W | 6–3, 6–2 |
| 2013 | WG2 PO | Apr 2013 | Koksijde (BEL) | Belgium | Hard (i) | Alison Van Uytvanck | W | 6–2, 6–4 |
| 2013 | WG2 PO | Apr 2013 | Koksijde (BEL) | Belgium | Hard (i) | Kirsten Flipkens | W | 4–6, 6–1, 6–2 |
| 2014 | WG2 | Feb 2014 | Borås (SWE) | Sweden | Hard (i) | Sofia Arvidsson | W | 6–1, 6–1 |
| 2014 | WG2 | Feb 2014 | Borås (SWE) | Sweden | Hard (i) | Johanna Larsson | W | 6–4, 6–1 |
| 2014 | WG PO | Apr 2014 | Barcelona (ESP) | Spain | Clay | Sílvia Soler Espinosa | W | 6–2, 6–2 |
| 2014 | WG PO | Apr 2014 | Barcelona (ESP) | Spain | Clay | María Teresa Torró Flor | W | 6–3, 6–2 |
| 2015 | WG QF | Feb 2015 | Kraków (POL) | Russia | Hard (i) | Svetlana Kuznetsova | L | 4–6, 6–2, 2–6 |
| 2015 | WG QF | Feb 2015 | Kraków (POL) | Russia | Hard (i) | Maria Sharapova | L | 1–6, 5–7 |
| 2015 | WG PO | Arp 2015 | Zielona Góra (POL) | Switzerland | Hard (i) | Martina Hingis | W | 6–4, 6–0 |
| 2015 | WG PO | Arp 2015 | Zielona Góra (POL) | Switzerland | Hard (i) | Timea Bacsinszky | L | 1–6, 1–6 |

=== Doubles: 10 (8–2) ===
| Edition | Round | Date | Location | Against | Surface | Partner | Opponents | W/L | Result |
|---|---|---|---|---|---|---|---|---|---|
| 2007 | Z1 | Apr 2007 | Plovdiv (BUL) | Luxembourg | Clay | Klaudia Jans | Anne Kremer; Lynn Philippe | W | 2–6, 6–1, 6–1 |
| 2007 | Z1 | Apr 2007 | Plovdiv (BUL) | (United Kingdom) Great Britain | Clay | Marta Domachowska | Elena Baltacha; Claire Curran | W | 6–3, 6–4 |
| 2011 | Z1 | Feb 2011 | Eilat (ISR) | Israel | Hard | Klaudia Jans | Julia Glushko; Shahar Pe'er | W | 6–3, 6–3 |
| 2012 | Z1 | Feb 2012 | Eilat (ISR) | Romania | Hard | Urszula Radwańska | Irina-Camelia Begu; Simona Halep | W | 4–6, 6–0, 6–0 |
| 2012 | Z1 | Feb 2012 | Eilat (ISR) | Sweden | Hard | Urszula Radwańska | Sofia Arvidsson; Johanna Larsson | L | 4–6, 3–6 |
| 2013 | Z1 | Feb 2013 | Eilat (ISR) | Israel | Hard | Urszula Radwańska | Julia Glushko; Shahar Pe'er | W | 4–6, 6–3, 6–4 |
| 2013 | Z1 | Feb 2013 | Eilat (ISR) | Croatia | Hard | Urszula Radwańska | Darija Jurak; Ana Konjuh | W | 6–2, 6–4 |
| 2014 | WG2 | Feb 2014 | Borås (SWE) | Sweden | Hard (i) | Alicja Rosolska | Sofia Arvidsson; Johanna Larsson | W | 6–2, 6–2 |
| 2014 | WG PO | Apr 2014 | Barcelona (ESP) | Spain | Clay | Alicja Rosolska | Anabel Medina Garrigues; Sílvia Soler Espinosa | W | 6–4, 6–2 |
| 2015 | WG PO | Apr 2015 | Zielona Góra (POL) | Switzerland | Hard (i) | Alicja Rosolska | Timea Bacsinszky; Viktorija Golubic | L | 6–2, 4–6, 7–9 |

== Notes ==
Sporting positions
| Preceded by (Czech Republic) Karolína Plíšková | US Open Series Champion; 2016 | Succeeded by Incumbent |
Awards
| Preceded by (India) Sania Mirza | WTA Newcomer of the Year; 2006 | Succeeded by (Hungary) Ágnes Szávay |
| Preceded by (Russia) Maria Sharapova | WTA Fan Favorite Singles Player of the Year; 2011 – 2016 | Succeeded by Incumbent |
Olympic Games
| Preceded by Marek Twardowski | Flagbearer for Poland; 2012 London | Succeeded by Karol Bielecki |
