= 2009 İstanbul Cup =

- Date: July 27 – August 2
- Edition: 5th
- Category: WTA International
- Draw: 32S / 16D
- Prize money: $220,000
- Surface: Clay / outdoor
- Location: Istanbul, Turkey

Champions

Singles
- (Russia) Vera Dushevina

Doubles
- (Czech Republic) Lucie Hradecká / (Czech Republic) Renata Voráčová
← 2008 ·	İstanbul Cup	· 2010 →

The 2009 İstanbul Cup was a women's tennis tournament played on outdoor hard courts. It was the fifth edition of the İstanbul Cup, and was part of the WTA International tournaments of the 2009 WTA Tour. It took place in Istanbul, Turkey, from 27 July through 2 August 2009. Fifth-seeded Vera Dushevina won the singles title.

== Finals ==
=== Singles ===
(Russia) Vera Dushevina defeated (Czech Republic) Lucie Hradecká, 6–0, 6–1

- It was Dushevina's first singles career title.

=== Doubles ===
(Czech Republic) Lucie Hradecká / (Czech Republic) Renata Voráčová defeated. (Germany) Julia Görges / (Switzerland) Patty Schnyder, 2–6, 6–3, 12–10

== Entrants ==
=== Seeds ===
Country	Player	Rank	Seed
RUS	Vera Zvonareva	7	1
SUI	Patty Schnyder	19	2
ESP	Anabel Medina Garrigues	20	3
FRA	Aravane Rezaï	39	4
RUS	Vera Dushevina	49	5
KAZ	Yaroslava Shvedova	57	6
BLR	Olga Govortsova	65	7
CZE	Lucie Hradecká	69	8

- Seeds are based on Rankings on July 20, 2009

=== Other entrants ===
The following players received wildcards into the singles main draw

- (Turkey) Pemra Özgen
- (Turkey) İpek Şenoğlu
- (Turkey) Çağla Büyükakçay

The following players received entry from the qualifying draw:

- (Belarus) Anastasiya Yakimova
- (Belarus) Ekaterina Dzehalevich
- (Russia) Alina Jidkova
- (Ukraine) Yuliana Fedak
