= 2008 İstanbul Cup =

- Date: 19–24 May
- Edition: 4th
- Category: Tier III Series
- Draw: 30S / 16D
- Prize money: $200,000
- Surface: Clay / outdoor
- Location: Istanbul, Turkey

Champions

Singles
- (Poland) Agnieszka Radwańska

Doubles
- (United States) Jill Craybas / (Belarus) Olga Govortsova
← 2007 ·	İstanbul Cup	· 2009 →

The 2008 Istanbul Cup was a women's tennis tournament played on outdoor clay courts. It was the 4th edition of the Istanbul Cup, and was part of the Tier III Series of the 2008 WTA Tour. It took place in Istanbul, Turkey, from 19 May through 24 May 2008. Second-seeded Agnieszka Radwańska won the singles title and earned $30,500 first-prize money.

== Finals ==
=== Singles ===
(Poland) Agnieszka Radwańska defeated (Russia) Elena Dementieva, 6–3, 6–2

- It was Radwańska's 2nd singles title of the year and the 3rd of her career.

=== Doubles ===
(United States) Jill Craybas / (Belarus) Olga Govortsova defeated (New Zealand) Marina Erakovic / (Slovenia) Polona Hercog, 6–1, 6–2
