= 2011 Toray Pan Pacific Open – Singles =

Singles
- 2011 Toray Pan Pacific Open

Final
- Champion: (Poland) Agnieszka Radwańska
- Runner-up: (Russia) Vera Zvonareva
- Score: 6–3, 6–2

Details
- Draw: 56 (8 Q / 3 WC )
- Seeds: 16

Events
Singles	Doubles
← 2010 ·	Pan Pacific Open	· 2012 →

Agnieszka Radwańska defeated Vera Zvonareva in the final, 6–3, 6–2 to win the singles tennis title at the 2011 Pan Pacific Open.

Caroline Wozniacki was the defending champion, but lost to Kaia Kanepi in the third round.

== Seeds ==
The top eight seeds received a bye into the second round.

1. (Denmark) Caroline Wozniacki (third round)
2. (Russia) Maria Sharapova (quarterfinals, retired due to a left ankle injury)
3. (Belarus) Victoria Azarenka (semifinals)
4. (Russia) Vera Zvonareva (final)
5. (Czech Republic) Petra Kvitová (semifinals)
6. (Australia) Samantha Stosur (second round)
7. (France) Marion Bartoli (quarterfinals)
8. (Serbia) Jelena Janković (third round)
9. (Poland) Agnieszka Radwańska (champion)
10. (China) Peng Shuai (third round)
11. (Russia) Anastasia Pavlyuchenkova (second round)
12. (Serbia) Ana Ivanovic (third round)
13. (Germany) Julia Görges (third round)
14. (Slovakia) Dominika Cibulková (second round)
15. (Italy) Flavia Pennetta (first round)
16. (Israel) Shahar Pe'er (second round)

== Main draw ==
=== Key ===
- Q = Qualifier
- WC = Wild card
- LL = Lucky loser
- Alt = Alternate
- ITF = ITF entry
- PR = Protected ranking
- SR = Special ranking
- SE = Special exempt
- JE = Junior exempt
- JR = Junior Accelerator Programme entrant
- CO = College Accelerator Programme entrant
- NG = Next Gen Accelerator Program entrant
- w/o = Walkover
- r = Retired
- d = Defaulted

=== Finals ===
Quarterfinals
(Estonia) Kaia Kanepi	2	6^{7}
9	(Poland) Agnieszka Radwańska	6	7^{9}
3	(Belarus) Victoria Azarenka	7	6
7	(France) Marion Bartoli	5	0
(Russia) Maria Kirilenko	3	3
4	(Russia) Vera Zvonareva	6	6
5	(Czech Republic) Petra Kvitová	4
2	(Russia) Maria Sharapova	3^{r}

Semifinals
9	(Poland) Agnieszka Radwańska	6	4	6
3	(Belarus) Victoria Azarenka	3	6	2
4	(Russia) Vera Zvonareva	7^{7}	6
5	(Czech Republic) Petra Kvitová	6^{2}	0

Final
9	(Poland) Agnieszka Radwańska	6	6
4	(Russia) Vera Zvonareva	3	2

=== Top half ===
==== Section 1 ====
First round
(Canada) R Marino	6	2	5
(Australia) J Gajdošová	1	6	7
Q	(United States) C Vandeweghe	7^{7}	4	6
(China) J Zheng	6^{4}	6	2
(Estonia) K Kanepi	3	6	6
15	(Italy) F Pennetta	6	4	4
9	(Poland) A Radwańska	6	6
WC	(Japan) M Doi	1	1
Q	(Germany) A Kerber	6	6
(Serbia) B Jovanovski	1	0
(Czech Republic) B Záhlavová-Strýcová	7^{7}	4
(Latvia) A Sevastova	6^{2}	1	r

Second round
1	(Denmark) C Wozniacki	6	6^{4}	6
(Australia) J Gajdošová	1	7^{7}	3
Q	(United States) C Vandeweghe	2	2
(Estonia) K Kanepi	6	6
9	(Poland) A Radwańska	3	6	6
Q	(Germany) A Kerber	6	3	3
(Czech Republic) B Záhlavová-Strýcová	4	2
8	(Serbia) J Janković	6	6

Third round
1	(Denmark) C Wozniacki	5	6	4
(Estonia) K Kanepi	7	1	6
9	(Poland) A Radwańska	2	6	6
8	(Serbia) J Janković	6	4	0

Quarterfinals
(Estonia) K Kanepi	2	6^{7}
9	(Poland) A Radwańska	6	7^{9}

==== Section 2 ====
First round
(Romania) I-C Begu	1	6	6
Q	(Czech Republic) Ka Plíšková	6	3	4
Q	(Poland) U Radwańska	6	3	1
(Czech Republic) K Zakopalová	3	6	6
WC	(Czech Republic) Kr Plíšková	6	5	1
16	(Israel) S Pe'er	4	7	6
10	(China) S Peng	6	6
Q	(United States) J Craybas	2	0
(United States) C McHale	7^{7}	6
(Austria) T Paszek	6^{1}	3
(United States) I Falconi	5	1
(Japan) A Morita	7	6

Second round
3	(Belarus) V Azarenka	6	6
(Romania) I-C Begu	1	3
(Czech Republic) K Zakopalová	6	6
16	(Israel) S Pe'er	3	1
10	(China) S Peng	6	6
(United States) C McHale	0	3
(Japan) A Morita	3	6	3
7	(France) M Bartoli	6	0	6

Third round
3	(Belarus) V Azarenka	6	7
(Czech Republic) K Zakopalová	3	5
10	(China) S Peng	2	1
7	(France) M Bartoli	6	6

Quarterfinals
3	(Belarus) V Azarenka	7	6
7	(France) M Bartoli	5	0

=== Bottom half ===
==== Section 3 ====
First round
Q	(Japan) E Sema	1	0
(Russia) M Kirilenko	6	6
WC	(United Kingdom) L Robson	6	6
(Romania) A Dulgheru	2	2
Q	(Australia) A Rodionova	4	0
12	(Serbia) A Ivanovic	6	6
14	(Slovakia) D Cibulková	2	6	6
(Slovakia) M Rybáriková	6	3	0
(Czech Republic) I Benešová	6	6
(Belarus) A Yakimova	2	4
(Argentina) G Dulko	6^{2}	1
(Bulgaria) T Pironkova	7^{7}	6

Second round
6	(Australia) S Stosur	2	6	4
(Russia) M Kirilenko	6	4	6
WC	(United Kingdom) L Robson	5	4
12	(Serbia) A Ivanovic	7	6
14	(Slovakia) D Cibulková	4	2
(Czech Republic) I Benešová	6	6
(Bulgaria) T Pironkova	5	0
4	(Russia) V Zvonareva	7	6

Third round
(Russia) M Kirilenko	6	6
12	(Serbia) A Ivanovic	3	1
(Czech Republic) I Benešová	1	2
4	(Russia) V Zvonareva	6	6

Quarterfinals
(Russia) M Kirilenko	3	3
4	(Russia) V Zvonareva	6	6

==== Section 4 ====
First round
Q	(Luxembourg) M Minella	1	6	6
(Japan) K Date-Krumm	6	3	3
(United States) V King	6	6
(China) S Zhang	1	0
(Netherlands) A Rus	4	3
11	(Russia) A Pavlyuchenkova	6	6
13	(Germany) J Görges	6	6
(France) P Parmentier	3	4
(Hungary) G Arn	7	6
(Sweden) S Arvidsson	5	3
(Thailand) T Tanasugarn	6	6
(Czech Republic) P Cetkovská	4	4

Second round
5	(Czech Republic) P Kvitová	6	6
Q	(Luxembourg) M Minella	2	3
(United States) V King	6	7^{8}
11	(Russia) A Pavlyuchenkova	4	6^{6}
13	(Germany) J Görges	6	6
(Hungary) G Arn	2	1
(Thailand) T Tanasugarn	2	5
2	(Russia) M Sharapova	6	7

Third round
5	(Czech Republic) P Kvitová	6	7^{7}
(United States) V King	1	6^{4}
13	(Germany) J Görges	6^{4}	6^{4}
2	(Russia) M Sharapova	7^{7}	7^{7}

Quarterfinals
5	(Czech Republic) P Kvitová	4
2	(Russia) M Sharapova	3	r
