= 2011 Toray Pan Pacific Open =

- Date: September 26 – October 2
- Edition: 28th
- Category: Premier 5
- Draw: 56S / 16D
- Prize money: $2,050,000
- Surface: Hard / outdoor
- Location: Tokyo, Japan
- Venue: Ariake Coliseum

Champions

Singles
- (Poland) Agnieszka Radwańska

Doubles
- (United States) Liezel Huber / (United States) Lisa Raymond
← 2010 ·	Pan Pacific Open	· 2012 →

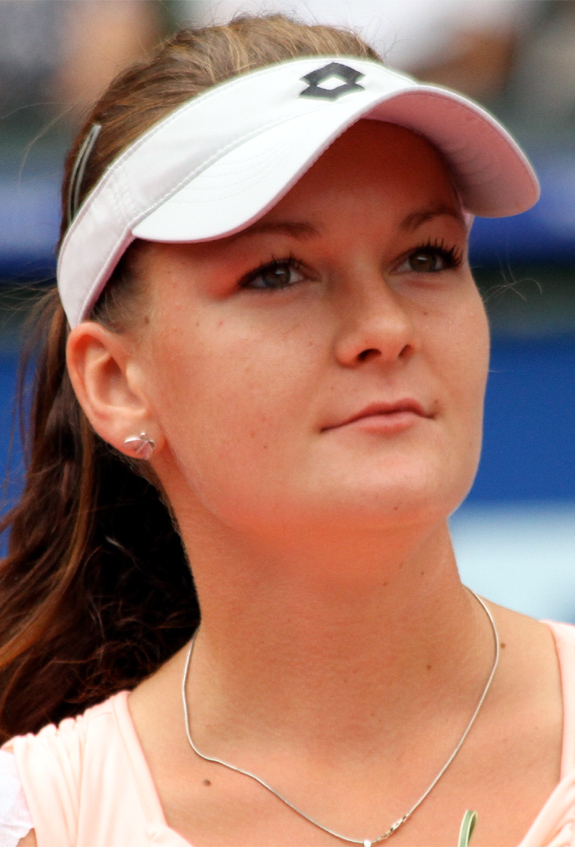
Agnieszka Radwańska (2011) at 2011 Toray Pan Pacific Open

The 2011 Toray Pan Pacific Open was a women's tennis tournament played on outdoor hard courts. It was the 28th edition of the Toray Pan Pacific Open, and was part of the Premier Series of the 2011 WTA Tour. It took place at the Ariake Coliseum in Tokyo, Japan, from September 26 through October 2, 2011. Ninth-seeded Agnieszka Radwańska won the singles title.

== Finals ==
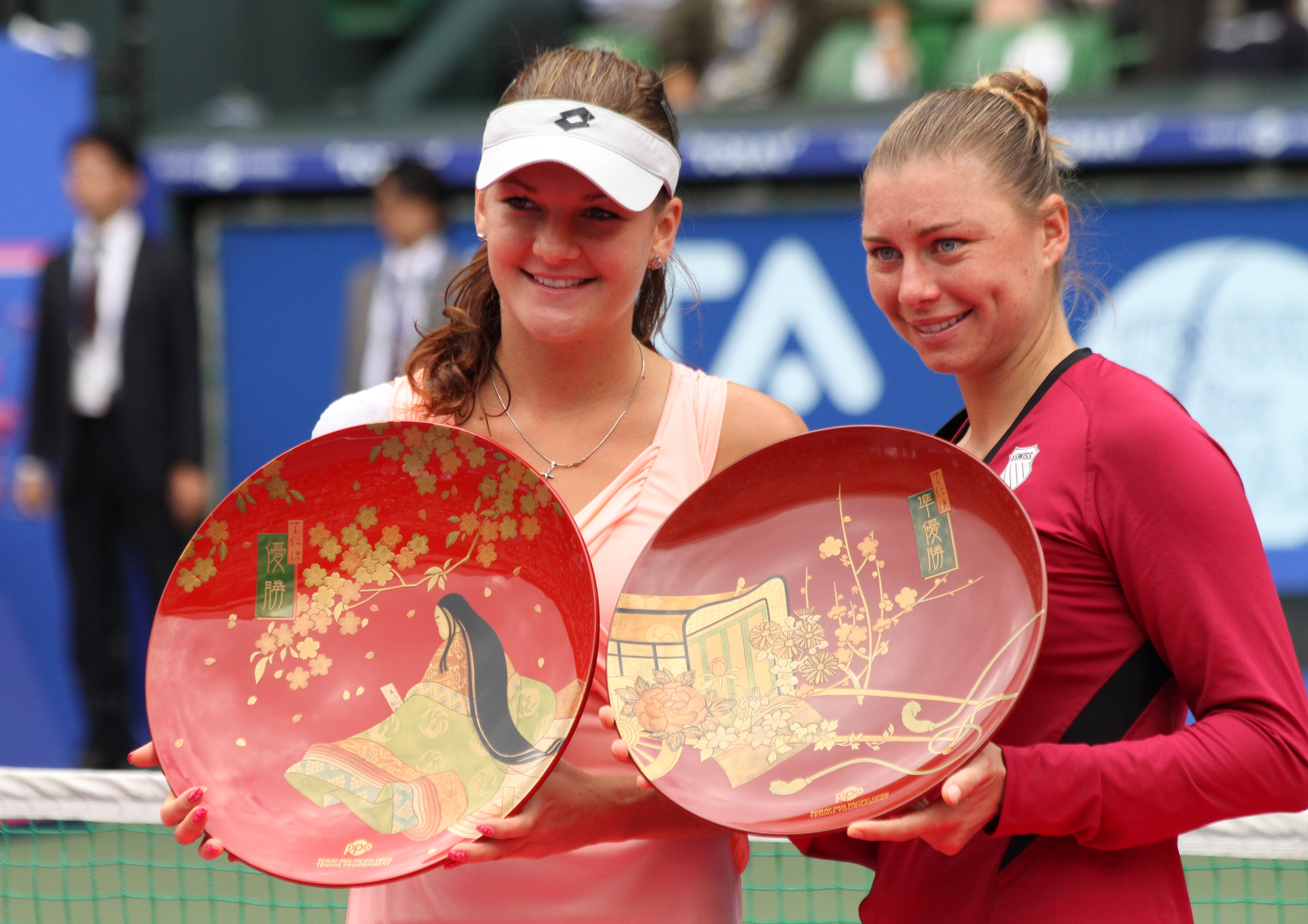
Finalists Agnieszka Radwańska and Vera Zvonareva with their trophies.

=== Singles ===
(Poland) Agnieszka Radwańska defeated (Russia) Vera Zvonareva, 6–3, 6–2.

- It was Radwańska's 2nd singles title of the year and 6th of her career.

=== Doubles ===
(United States) Liezel Huber / (United States) Lisa Raymond defeated (Argentina) Gisela Dulko / (Italy) Flavia Pennetta, 7–6^{(7–4)}, 0–6, [10–6].

== Points and prize money ==
=== Point distribution ===
Stage	Women's singles	Women's doubles
Champion	900	
Runner up	620	
Semifinals	395	
Quarterfinals	225	
Round of 16	125	1
Round of 32	70	–
Round of 64	1	–
Qualifier	30	–
Qualifying Finalist	20	–
Qualifying 1st round	1	–

=== Prize money ===
Stage	Women's singles	Women's doubles
Champion	$360,000	$103,000
Runner up	$180,000	$51,550
Semifinals	$90,000	$32,350
Quarterfinals	$41,450	$16,250
Round of 16	$20,550	$8,100
Round of 32	$10,575	–
Round of 64	$5,500	–
Final round qualifying	$3,000	–
First round qualifying	$1,550	–

== Entrants ==
=== Seeds ===
Country	Player	Rank^{1}	Seed
DEN	Caroline Wozniacki	1	1
RUS	Maria Sharapova	2	2
BLR	Victoria Azarenka	3	3
RUS	Vera Zvonareva	4	4
CZE	Petra Kvitová	6	5
AUS	Samantha Stosur	7	6
FRA	Marion Bartoli	10	7
SRB	Jelena Janković	12	8
POL	Agnieszka Radwańska	13	9
CHN	Peng Shuai	15	10
RUS	Anastasia Pavlyuchenkova	16	11
SRB	Ana Ivanovic	20	12
GER	Julia Görges	21	13
SVK	Dominika Cibulková	22	14
ITA	Flavia Pennetta	23	15
ISR	Shahar Pe'er	26	16

- Rankings are as of September 19, 2011.

=== Other entrants ===
The following players received wildcards into the singles main draw:

- (Japan) Misaki Doi
- (Czech Republic) Kristýna Plíšková
- (United Kingdom) Laura Robson

The following players received entry from the qualifying draw:

- (United States) Jill Craybas
- (Germany) Angelique Kerber
- (Luxembourg) Mandy Minella
- (Czech Republic) Karolína Plíšková
- (Poland) Urszula Radwańska
- (Australia) Anastasia Rodionova
- (Japan) Erika Sema
- (United States) Coco Vandeweghe

=== Notable withdrawals ===
- (Belgium) Kim Clijsters
- (China) Li Na
- (Germany) Andrea Petkovic
- (Germany) Sabine Lisicki
- (Italy) Francesca Schiavone
- (Italy) Roberta Vinci
- (Belgium) Yanina Wickmayer
- (United States) Serena Williams
- (United States) Venus Williams
