= 2011 Toray Pan Pacific Open – Doubles =

Doubles
- 2011 Toray Pan Pacific Open

Final
- Champions: (United States) Liezel Huber (United States) Lisa Raymond
- Runners-up: (Argentina) Gisela Dulko (Italy) Flavia Pennetta
- Score: 7–6^{(7–4)}, 0–6, [10–6]

Details
- Draw: 16
- Seeds: 4

Events
Singles	Doubles
← 2010 ·	Toray Pan Pacific Open	· 2012 →

Iveta Benešová and Barbora Záhlavová-Strýcová were the defending champions, but lost to Gisela Dulko and Flavia Pennetta in the first round.

Top Seeded Liezel Huber and Lisa Raymond won the tournament by defeating Gisela Dulko and Flavia Pennetta in the final, 7–6^{(7–4)}, 0–6, [10–6].

== Seeds ==
1. (United States) Liezel Huber / (United States) Lisa Raymond (champions)
2. (Argentina) Gisela Dulko / (Italy) Flavia Pennetta (final)
3. (United States) Vania King / (Kazakhstan) Yaroslava Shvedova (semifinals)
4. (Belarus) Victoria Azarenka / (Russia) Maria Kirilenko (semifinals, retired)

== Draw ==
=== Key ===
- Q = Qualifier
- WC = Wild card
- LL = Lucky loser
- Alt = Alternate
- ITF = ITF entry
- PR = Protected ranking
- SR = Special ranking
- SE = Special exempt
- JE = Junior exempt
- JR = Junior Accelerator Programme entrant
- CO = College Accelerator Programme entrant
- NG = Next Gen Accelerator Program entrant
- w/o = Walkover
- r = Retired
- d = Defaulted

=== Draw ===
First round
1	(United States) L Huber (United States) L Raymond	6	6
WC	(Japan) R Fujiwara (Japan) A Morita	1	3
(Chinese Taipei) Y-j Chan (Germany) J Görges	6	1	[10]
Alt	(Slovakia) M Rybáriková (Czech Republic) K Zakopalová	2	6	[8]
4	(Belarus) V Azarenka (Russia) M Kirilenko	6	6
(Romania) A Dulgheru (Thailand) T Tanasugarn	2	1
(Japan) K Date-Krumm (China) S Zhang	6^{5}	4
(United States) R Kops-Jones (United States) A Spears	7^{7}	6
(Chinese Taipei) C-j Chuang (Israel) S Pe'er	3	6	[8]
(South Africa) N Grandin (Czech Republic) V Uhlířová	6	2	[10]
(Chinese Taipei) S-w Hsieh (China) J Zheng	6	6^{4}	[9]
3	(United States) V King (Kazakhstan) Y Shvedova	2	7^{7}	[11]
(Poland) K Jans-Ignacik (Poland) A Rosolska	6^{5}	3
(Romania) I-C Begu (Australia) A Rodionova	7^{7}	6
(Czech Republic) I Benešová (Czech Republic) B Záhlavová-Strýcová	3	2
2	(Argentina) G Dulko (Italy) F Pennetta	6	6

Quarterfinals
1	(United States) L Huber (United States) L Raymond	6	6
(Chinese Taipei) Y-j Chan (Germany) J Görges	3	2
4	(Belarus) V Azarenka (Russia) M Kirilenko	6	6
(United States) R Kops-Jones (United States) A Spears	0	1
(South Africa) N Grandin (Czech Republic) V Uhlířová	4	4
3	(United States) V King (Kazakhstan) Y Shvedova	6	6
(Romania) I-C Begu (Australia) A Rodionova	1	1
2	(Argentina) G Dulko (Italy) F Pennetta	6	6

Semifinals
1	(United States) L Huber (United States) L Raymond	1
4	(Belarus) V Azarenka (Russia) M Kirilenko	2^{r}
3	(United States) V King (Kazakhstan) Y Shvedova	6	3	[8]
2	(Argentina) G Dulko (Italy) F Pennetta	4	6	[10]

Final
1	(United States) L Huber (United States) L Raymond	7^{7}	0	[10]
2	(Argentina) G Dulko (Italy) F Pennetta	6^{4}	6	[6]
