= 2009 İstanbul Cup – Singles =

Singles
- 2009 İstanbul Cup

Final
- Champion: (Russia) Vera Dushevina
- Runner-up: (Czech Republic) Lucie Hradecká
- Score: 6–0, 6–1

Details
- Draw: 32
- Seeds: 8

Events
Singles	Doubles
← 2008 ·	İstanbul Cup	· 2010 →

Agnieszka Radwańska was the defending champion, but chose not to participate that year.

Vera Dushevina won in the final 6–0, 6–1 against Lucie Hradecká.

== Seeds ==
1. (Russia) Vera Zvonareva (first round)
2. (Switzerland) Patty Schnyder (first round)
3. (Spain) Anabel Medina Garrigues (quarterfinals)
4. (France) Aravane Rezaï (second round)
5. (Russia) Vera Dushevina (champion)
6. (Kazakhstan) Yaroslava Shvedova (withdrew)
7. (Belarus) Olga Govortsova (quarterfinals)
8. (Czech Republic) Lucie Hradecká (final)

== Draw ==
Key

- Q = Qualifier
- WC = Wild card
- LL = Lucky loser
- Alt = Alternate
- ITF = ITF entry
- PR = Protected ranking
- SR = Special ranking
- SE = Special exempt
- JE = Junior exempt
- JR = Junior Accelerator Programme entrant
- CO = College Accelerator Programme entrant
- NG = Next Gen Accelerator Program entrant
- w/o = Walkover
- r = Retired
- d = Defaulted

=== Finals ===
Semifinals
(Switzerland) Timea Bacsinszky	2	4
5	(Russia) Vera Dushevina	6	6
8	(Czech Republic) Lucie Hradecká	6^{5}	7	7
(Germany) Andrea Petkovic	7	5	5

Final
5	(Russia) Vera Dushevina	6	6
8	(Czech Republic) Lucie Hradecká	0	1

=== Top half ===
First round
1	(Russia) V Zvonareva	2	6	4
(Ukraine) M Koryttseva	6	1	6
(Slovenia) P Hercog	2	2
(Switzerland) T Bacsinszky	6	6
(Switzerland) S Vögele	2	6^{4}
(Poland) U Radwańska	6	7
Q	(Belarus) E Dzehalevich	6	7
LL	(Belarus) D Kustova	4	6^{9}
3	(Spain) A Medina Garrigues	6	6
Q	(Belarus) A Yakimova	4	2
(Netherlands) A Rus	3	7	2
WC	(Turkey) P Özgen	6	6^{2}	6
WC	(Turkey) İ Şenoğlu	0	2
(Italy) ME Camerin	6	6
Q	(Ukraine) Y Fedak	1	4
5	(Russia) V Dushevina	6	6

Second round
(Ukraine) M Koryttseva	2	6	1^{r}
(Switzerland) T Bacsinszky	6	3	4
(Poland) U Radwańska	7	1	6
Q	(Belarus) E Dzehalevich	5	6	4
3	(Spain) A Medina Garrigues	2	6	6
WC	(Turkey) P Özgen	6	2	0
(Italy) ME Camerin	0	1
5	(Russia) V Dushevina	6	6

Quarterfinals
(Switzerland) T Bacsinszky	6	6
(Poland) U Radwańska	0	1
3	(Spain) A Medina Garrigues	1	2
5	(Russia) V Dushevina	6	6

Semifinals
(Switzerland) T Bacsinszky	2	4
5	(Russia) V Dushevina	6	6

=== Bottom half ===
First round
8	(Czech Republic) L Hradecká	4	6	6
WC	(Turkey) Ç Büyükakçay	6	3	0
(Slovenia) M Zec Peškirič	2	3
(Germany) J Görges	6	6
(Austria) P Mayr	6	2	0
(Poland) M Domachowska	1	6	6
(Ukraine) V Kutuzova	6^{3}	2
4	(France) A Rezaï	7	6
7	(Belarus) O Govortsova	6	5	6
(Bulgaria) T Pironkova	2	7	4
Q	(Russia) A Jidkova	2	3
(Germany) A Kerber	6	6
(Czech Republic) S Záhlavová	1	2
(Germany) A Petkovic	6	6
(Paraguay) R de los Ríos	7	2	6
2	(Switzerland) P Schnyder	6^{3}	6	3

Second round
8	(Czech Republic) L Hradecká	2	6	6
(Germany) J Görges	6	4	1
(Poland) M Domachowska	6	4	6
4	(France) A Rezaï	3	6	4
7	(Belarus) O Govortsova	6	6^{7}	6
(Germany) A Kerber	4	7	4
(Germany) A Petkovic	6	6
(Paraguay) R de los Ríos	1	0

Quarterfinals
8	(Czech Republic) L Hradecká	6	5	6
(Poland) M Domachowska	1	7	4
7	(Belarus) O Govortsova	3	3
(Germany) A Petkovic	6	6

Semifinals
8	(Czech Republic) L Hradecká	6^{5}	7	7
(Germany) A Petkovic	7	5	5
