= 2012 Toray Pan Pacific Open – Doubles =

Doubles
- 2012 Toray Pan Pacific Open

Final
- Champions: (United States) Raquel Kops-Jones (United States) Abigail Spears
- Runners-up: (Germany) Anna-Lena Grönefeld (Czech Republic) Květa Peschke
- Score: 6–1, 6–4

Details
- Draw: 16
- Seeds: 4

Events
Singles	Doubles
← 2011 ·	Toray Pan Pacific Open	· 2013 →

Liezel Huber and Lisa Raymond were the defending champions, but Huber chose not to compete that year. Raymond played with Sabine Lisicki.
Raquel Kops-Jones and Abigail Spears defeated in the final the fourth seeded Anna-Lena Grönefeld and Květa Peschke with the score 6–1, 6–4.

== Seeds ==
1. (United States) Vania King / (Kazakhstan) Yaroslava Shvedova (first round)
2. (Spain) Nuria Llagostera Vives / (India) Sania Mirza (first round)
3. (Slovenia) Katarina Srebotnik / (China) Zheng Jie (quarterfinals)
4. (Germany) Anna-Lena Grönefeld / (Czech Republic) Květa Peschke (final)

== Draw ==
=== Key ===
- Q = Qualifier
- WC = Wild card
- LL = Lucky loser
- Alt = Alternate
- ITF = ITF entry
- PR = Protected ranking
- SR = Special ranking
- SE = Special exempt
- JE = Junior exempt
- JR = Junior Accelerator Programme entrant
- CO = College Accelerator Programme entrant
- NG = Next Gen Accelerator Program entrant
- w/o = Walkover
- r = Retired
- d = Defaulted

=== Draw ===
First round
1	(United States) V King (Kazakhstan) Y Shvedova	3	6^{5}
WC	(Russia) A Pavlyuchenkova (Czech Republic) L Šafářová	6	7^{7}
(Germany) J Görges (Czech Republic) B Záhlavová-Strýcová	6	5	[10]
WC	(Chinese Taipei) C-j Chuang (Japan) K Date-Krumm	1	7	[5]
4	(Germany) A-L Grönefeld (Czech Republic) K Peschke	6	6
WC	(Slovakia) D Hantuchová (China) S Peng	1	2
(Chinese Taipei) S-w Hsieh (Spain) A Medina Garrigues	6	6
(South Africa) N Grandin (Czech Republic) V Uhlířová	0	3
(United States) R Kops-Jones (United States) A Spears	7^{7}	6
(Slovakia) J Husárová (Kazakhstan) G Voskoboeva	6^{4}	3
(Australia) C Dellacqua (Poland) K Jans-Ignacik	4	2
3	(Slovenia) K Srebotnik (China) J Zheng	6	6
(Romania) M Niculescu (Poland) A Rosolska	3	1
(Germany) S Lisicki (United States) L Raymond	6	6
Alt	(Croatia) D Jurak (Hungary) K Marosi	6	4	[10]
2	(Spain) N Llagostera Vives (India) S Mirza	0	6	[8]

Quarterfinals
WC	(Russia) A Pavlyuchenkova (Czech Republic) L Šafářová	6	3	[5]
(Germany) J Görges (Czech Republic) B Záhlavová-Strýcová	1	6	[10]
4	(Germany) A-L Grönefeld (Czech Republic) K Peschke	6	7
(Chinese Taipei) S-w Hsieh (Spain) A Medina Garrigues	4	5
(United States) R Kops-Jones (United States) A Spears	6	6
3	(Slovenia) K Srebotnik (China) J Zheng	3	2
(Germany) S Lisicki (United States) L Raymond	6	6
Alt	(Croatia) D Jurak (Hungary) K Marosi	4	2

Semifinals
(Germany) J Görges (Czech Republic) B Záhlavová-Strýcová	6	1	[7]
4	(Germany) A-L Grönefeld (Czech Republic) K Peschke	1	6	[10]
(United States) R Kops-Jones (United States) A Spears	6	6
(Germany) S Lisicki (United States) L Raymond	4	3

Final
4	(Germany) A-L Grönefeld (Czech Republic) K Peschke	1	4
(United States) R Kops-Jones (United States) A Spears	6	6
