= 2009 İstanbul Cup – Doubles =

Doubles
- 2009 İstanbul Cup

Final
- Champion: (Czech Republic) Lucie Hradecká (Czech Republic) Renata Voráčová
- Runner-up: (Germany) Julia Görges (Switzerland) Patty Schnyder
- Score: 2–6, 6–3, 12–10

Details
- Draw: 16
- Seeds: 4

Events
| Singles | Doubles |
| ← 2008 · | İstanbul Cup | · 2010 → |

Jill Craybas and Olga Govortsova were the defending champions, but chose not to participate this year.

Lucie Hradecká and Renata Voráčová won in the final 2–6, 6–3, 12–10 against Julia Görges and Patty Schnyder.

== Seeds ==
1. (Turkey) İpek Şenoğlu / (Kazakhstan) Yaroslava Shvedova (semifinals)
2. (Germany) Julia Görges / (Switzerland) Patty Schnyder (final)
3. (Czech Republic) Lucie Hradecká / (Czech Republic) Renata Voráčová (champions)
4. (Belarus) Ekaterina Dzehalevich / (Czech Republic) Eva Hrdinová (first round)

== Draw ==
Key

- Q = Qualifier
- WC = Wild card
- LL = Lucky loser
- Alt = Alternate
- ITF = ITF entry
- PR = Protected ranking
- SR = Special ranking
- SE = Special exempt
- JE = Junior exempt
- JR = Junior Accelerator Programme entrant
- CO = College Accelerator Programme entrant
- NG = Next Gen Accelerator Program entrant
- w/o = Walkover
- r = Retired
- d = Defaulted

=== Draw ===
First round
1 | (Turkey) İ Şenoğlu (Kazakhstan) Y Shvedova | 6 | 5 | [10]
WC | (Turkey) C Büyükakçay (Turkey) P Özgen | 3 | 7 | [2]
ALT | (Russia) A Jidkova (Slovenia) M Zec Peškirič | 1 | 2
(Italy) ME Camerin (Slovenia) P Hercog | 6 | 6
3 | (Czech Republic) L Hradecká (Czech Republic) R Voráčová | 6 | 6
(Kyrgyzstan) K Palkina (Bulgaria) T Pironkova | 4 | 1
(South Africa) K Anderson (United Kingdom) S Borwell | 3 | 1
(Poland) M Domachowska (South Africa) N Grandin | 6 | 6
(Russia) M Kondratieva (France) S Lefèvre | 6 | 6
(Ukraine) Y Beygelzimer (Ukraine) Y Fedak | 3 | 2
(Germany) C Klaschka (Germany) A Petkovic | 7 | 6
4 | (Belarus) E Dzehalevich (Czech Republic) E Hrdinová | 5 | 4
(Austria) S Klemenschits (Belarus) A Yakimova | 7 | 4 | [8]
(Belarus) D Kustova (Czech Republic) V Uhlířová | 6^{4} | 6 | [10]
(Russia) V Dushevina (Russia) E Ivanova | 3 | 7 | [7]
2 | (Germany) J Görges (Switzerland) P Schnyder | 6 | 5 | [10]

Quarterfinals
1 | (Turkey) İ Şenoğlu (Kazakhstan) Y Shvedova | 7 | 6
(Italy) ME Camerin (Slovenia) P Hercog | 5 | 1
3 | (Czech Republic) L Hradecká (Czech Republic) R Voráčová | 7 | 6
(Poland) M Domachowska (South Africa) N Grandin | 6^{5} | 1
(Russia) M Kondratieva (France) S Lefèvre | 6^{3} | 4
(Germany) C Klaschka (Germany) A Petkovic | 7 | 6
(Belarus) D Kustova (Czech Republic) V Uhlířová | 5 | 3
2 | (Germany) J Görges (Switzerland) P Schnyder | 7 | 6

Semifinals
1 | (Turkey) İ Şenoğlu (Kazakhstan) Y Shvedova | 7 | 4 | [2]
3 | (Czech Republic) L Hradecká (Czech Republic) R Voráčová | 6^{5} | 6 | [10]
(Germany) C Klaschka (Germany) A Petkovic | 3 | 1
2 | (Germany) J Görges (Switzerland) P Schnyder | 6 | 6

Final
3 | (Czech Republic) L Hradecká (Czech Republic) R Voráčová | 2 | 6 | [12]
2 | (Germany) J Görges (Switzerland) P Schnyder | 6 | 3 | [10]
