= 2008 İstanbul Cup – Doubles =

Doubles
- 2008 İstanbul Cup

Final
- Champions: (United States) Jill Craybas (Belarus) Olga Govortsova
- Runners-up: (New Zealand) Marina Erakovic (Slovenia) Polona Hercog
- Score: 6–1, 6–2

Details
- Draw: 16
- Seeds: 4

Events
Singles	Doubles
← 2007 ·	İstanbul Cup	· 2009 →

Agnieszka Radwańska and Urszula Radwańska were the defending champions, but chose not to participate that year.

Jill Craybas and Olga Govortsova won in the final 6–1, 6–2, against Marina Erakovic and Polona Hercog.

== Seeds ==
1. (United States) Vania King / (Japan) Aiko Nakamura (first round)
2. (Russia) Alla Kudryavtseva / (Germany) Martina Müller (semifinals)
3. (United States) Jill Craybas / (Belarus) Olga Govortsova (champions)
4. (Russia) Anastasia Rodionova / (Russia) Arina Rodionova (semifinals)

== Draw ==
Key

- Q = Qualifier
- WC = Wild card
- LL = Lucky loser
- Alt = Alternate
- ITF = ITF entry
- PR = Protected ranking
- SR = Special ranking
- SE = Special exempt
- JE = Junior exempt
- JR = Junior Accelerator Programme entrant
- CO = College Accelerator Programme entrant
- NG = Next Gen Accelerator Program entrant
- w/o = Walkover
- r = Retired
- d = Defaulted

=== Draw ===
First round
1	(United States) V King (Japan) A Nakamura	0	2
(New Zealand) M Erakovic (Slovenia) P Hercog	6	6
(Russia) A Poltoratskaya (Russia) A Tsybysheva	2	5
(Bosnia and Herzegovina) M Jugić-Salkić (Turkey) İ Şenoğlu	6	7
4	(Russia) A Rodionova (Russia) A Rodionova	6	6
(Uzbekistan) A Amanmuradova (Germany) J Wöhr	4	2
(United States) J Ditty (Slovenia) A Klepač	6	6
(Romania) S Cîrstea (Poland) M Domachowska	4	2
(Italy) N Clerico (Kyrgyzstan) K Palkina	6	2	[5]
(Sweden) S Arvidsson (United States) L Osterloh	3	6	[10]
(Czech Republic) V Chvojková (Russia) E Grebenyuk	2	0
3	(United States) J Craybas (Belarus) O Govortsova	6	6
WC	(Bulgaria) S Krivencheva (Turkey) P Özgen	3	0
(Canada) S Dubois (Israel) T Obziler	6	6
(Turkey) C Büyükakçay (Greece) A Koumantou	1	3
2	(Russia) A Kudryavtseva (Germany) M Müller	6	6

Quarterfinals
(New Zealand) M Erakovic (Slovenia) P Hercog	4	7	[13]
(Bosnia and Herzegovina) M Jugić-Salkić (Turkey) İ Şenoğlu	6	6^{2}	[11]
4	(Russia) A Rodionova (Russia) A Rodionova	6	7
(United States) J Ditty (Slovenia) A Klepač	2	6^{2}
(Sweden) S Arvidsson (United States) L Osterloh	0	5
3	(United States) J Craybas (Belarus) O Govortsova	6	7
(Canada) S Dubois (Israel) T Obziler	0	4
2	(Russia) A Kudryavtseva (Germany) M Müller	6	6

Semifinals
(New Zealand) M Erakovic (Slovenia) P Hercog	4	6	[10]
4	(Russia) A Rodionova (Russia) A Rodionova	6	2	[0]
3	(United States) J Craybas (Belarus) O Govortsova	6	6
2	(Russia) A Kudryavtseva (Germany) M Müller	3	2

Final
(New Zealand) M Erakovic (Slovenia) P Hercog	1	2
3	(United States) J Craybas (Belarus) O Govortsova	6	6
