= 2012 Toray Pan Pacific Open =

- Date: September 23–29
- Edition: 29th
- Category: Premier Series
- Draw: 56S / 16D
- Prize money: $2,168,400
- Surface: Hard / outdoor
- Location: Tokyo, Japan
- Venue: Ariake Coliseum

Champions

Singles
- (Russia) Nadia Petrova

Doubles
- (United States) Raquel Kops-Jones / (United States) Abigail Spears
← 2011 ·	Pan Pacific Open	· 2013 →

The 2012 Toray Pan Pacific Open was a women's tennis tournament played on outdoor hard courts. It was the 29th edition of the Toray Pan Pacific Open, and part of the Premier Series of the 2012 WTA Tour. It took place at the Ariake Coliseum in Tokyo, Japan, from September 23 through 29, 2012. Nadia Petrova, who was seeded 17th, won the singles title.

== Finals ==
=== Singles ===
- (Russia) Nadia Petrova defeated (Poland) Agnieszka Radwańska 6–0, 1–6, 6–3

=== Doubles ===
- (United States) Raquel Kops-Jones / (United States) Abigail Spears defeated (Germany) Anna-Lena Grönefeld / (Czech Republic) Květa Peschke 6–1, 6–4

== Points and prize money ==
=== Point distribution ===
Stage	Women's singles	Women's doubles
Champion	900	
Runner up	620	
Semifinals	395	
Quarterfinals	225	
Round of 16	125	1
Round of 32	70	–
Round of 64	1	–
Qualifier	30	–
Qualifying Finalist	20	–
Qualifying 1st round	1	–

=== Prize money ===
Stage	Women's singles	Women's doubles
Champion	$385,000	$110,000
Runner up	$192,000	$59,850
Semifinals	$96,100	$31,600
Quarterfinals	$44,250	$16,800
Round of 16	$22,000	$9,150
Round of 32	$11,300	-
Round of 64	$5,800	-
Qualifying Finalist	$3,200	-
Qualifying 1st round	$1,650	-

== Singles main-draw entrants ==
=== Seeds ===
Country	Player	Rank^{1}	Seed
BLR	Victoria Azarenka	1	1
RUS	Maria Sharapova	2	2
POL	Agnieszka Radwańska	3	3
CZE	Petra Kvitová	5	4
GER	Angelique Kerber	6	5
ITA	Sara Errani	7	6
CHN	Li Na	8	7
AUS	Samantha Stosur	9	8
FRA	Marion Bartoli	10	9
DEN	Caroline Wozniacki	11	10
SRB	Ana Ivanovic	12	11
SVK	Dominika Cibulková	13	12
~~RUS~~	~~Maria Kirilenko~~	~~14~~	~~13~~
ITA	Roberta Vinci	15	14
EST	Kaia Kanepi	16	15
CZE	Lucie Šafářová	17	16
RUS	Nadia Petrova	18	17

- ^{1} Rankings are as of September 17, 2012

=== Other entrants ===
The following players received wildcards into the singles main draw:

- (Japan) Kimiko Date-Krumm
- (France) Caroline Garcia
- (Japan) Ayumi Morita

The following players received entry from the qualifying draw:

- (Italy) Camila Giorgi
- (United States) Jamie Hampton
- (Serbia) Bojana Jovanovski
- (Sweden) Johanna Larsson
- (Japan) Kurumi Nara
- (France) Pauline Parmentier
- (Spain) Sílvia Soler Espinosa
- (United Kingdom) Heather Watson

The following players received entry as lucky loser:

- (Czech Republic) Andrea Hlaváčková

=== Withdrawals ===
- (Russia) Maria Kirilenko (back injury)

=== Retirements ===
- (Belarus) Victoria Azarenka (dizziness)
- (Czech Republic) Andrea Hlaváčková (left thigh injury)
- (Czech Republic) Klára Zakopalová (left wrist injury)

== Doubles main-draw entrants ==
=== Seeds ===
Country	Player	Country	Player	Rank^{1}	Seed
USA	Vania King	KAZ	Yaroslava Shvedova	28	1
ESP	Nuria Llagostera Vives	IND	Sania Mirza	30	2
SLO	Katarina Srebotnik	CHN	Zheng Jie	31	3
GER	Anna-Lena Grönefeld	CZE	Květa Peschke	41	4

- ^{1} Rankings are as of September 17, 2012

=== Other entrants ===
The following pairs received wildcards into the doubles main draw:

- (Chinese Taipei) Chuang Chia-jung / (Japan) Kimiko Date-Krumm
- (Slovakia) Daniela Hantuchová / (China) Peng Shuai
- (Russia) Anastasia Pavlyuchenkova / (Czech Republic) Lucie Šafářová

The following pair received entry as alternates:

- (Croatia) Darija Jurak / (Hungary) Katalin Marosi

=== Withdrawals ===
- (Czech Republic) Andrea Hlaváčková (left thigh injury)
