= 2008 İstanbul Cup – Singles =

Singles
- 2008 İstanbul Cup

Final
- Champion: (Poland) Agnieszka Radwańska
- Runner-up: (Russia) Elena Dementieva
- Score: 6–3, 6–2

Details
- Draw: 30
- Seeds: 8

Events
Singles	Doubles
← 2007 ·	İstanbul Cup	· 2009 →

Elena Dementieva was the defending champion, but second-seeded Agnieszka Radwańska defeated her 6–3, 6–2, in the final.

== Seeds ==
The top two seeds receive a bye into the second round.

1. (Russia) Elena Dementieva (final)
2. (Poland) Agnieszka Radwańska (champion)
3. (Russia) Nadia Petrova (quarterfinals)
4. (Belarus) Olga Govortsova (quarterfinals)
5. (Sweden) Sofia Arvidsson (first round)
6. (Uzbekistan) Akgul Amanmuradova (semifinals)
7. (United States) Jill Craybas (quarterfinals)
8. (Bulgaria) Tsvetana Pironkova (semifinals)

== Draw ==
Key

- Q = Qualifier
- WC = Wild card
- LL = Lucky loser
- Alt = Alternate
- ITF = ITF entry
- PR = Protected ranking
- SR = Special ranking
- SE = Special exempt
- JE = Junior exempt
- JR = Junior Accelerator Programme entrant
- CO = College Accelerator Programme entrant
- NG = Next Gen Accelerator Program entrant
- w/o = Walkover
- r = Retired
- d = Defaulted

=== Finals ===
Semifinals
1	(Russia) Elena Dementieva	6	6
6	(Uzbekistan) Akgul Amanmuradova	2	4
8	(Bulgaria) Tsvetana Pironkova	6^{1}	6	1
2	(Poland) Agnieszka Radwańska	7	3	6

Final
1	(Russia) Elena Dementieva	3	2
2	(Poland) Agnieszka Radwańska	6	6

=== Top half ===
First round
WC	(Turkey) C Büyükakçay	2	6	6^{2}
Q	(Romania) L Ungur	6	4	7
(United States) V King	6	6^{1}	6
(Russia) A Kudryavtseva	1	7	3
(Israel) T Obziler	2	6	4
7	(United States) J Craybas	6	3	6
3	(Russia) N Petrova	6	6
(United States) L Osterloh	1	2
(Poland) M Domachowska	7	6
(New Zealand) M Erakovic	6^{2}	3
(Japan) A Morigami	6	6^{6}	1^{r}
(Japan) A Nakamura	3	7	4
(Germany) M Müller	4	1
6	(Uzbekistan) A Amanmuradova	6	6

Second round
1	(Russia) E Dementieva	6	7
Q	(Romania) L Ungur	2	6^{4}
(United States) V King	4	2
7	(United States) J Craybas	6	6
3	(Russia) N Petrova	6	6
(Poland) M Domachowska	2	2
(Japan) A Nakamura	3	3
6	(Uzbekistan) A Amanmuradova	6	6

Quarterfinals
1	(Russia) E Dementieva	6	6
7	(United States) J Craybas	1	4
3	(Russia) N Petrova	6^{0}	6	4
6	(Uzbekistan) A Amanmuradova	7	1	6

Semifinals
1	(Russia) E Dementieva	6	6
6	(Uzbekistan) A Amanmuradova	2	4

=== Bottom half ===
First round
8	(Bulgaria) T Pironkova	6	7
Q	(Slovenia) P Hercog	4	5
Q	(Czech Republic) V Chvojková	7	6
WC	(Turkey) P Özgen	5	4
(Russia) A Rodionova	6	3	1
(Italy) N Viérin	3	6	6
WC	(Turkey) İ Şenoğlu	3	2
4	(Belarus) O Govortsova	6	6
5	(Sweden) S Arvidsson	3	6^{2}
(Slovenia) A Klepač	6	7
(United States) J Ditty	2	3
(Canada) S Dubois	6	6
(Romania) S Cîrstea	6	6
Q	(Slovenia) M Zec Peškirič	3	4

Second round
8	(Bulgaria) T Pironkova	6	6
Q	(Czech Republic) V Chvojková	2	1
(Italy) N Viérin	6^{3}	1
4	(Belarus) O Govortsova	7	6
(Slovenia) A Klepač	4	6	7
(Canada) S Dubois	6	2	5
(Romania) S Cîrstea	0	0
2	(Poland) A Radwańska	6	6

Quarterfinals
8	(Bulgaria) T Pironkova	7	7
4	(Belarus) O Govortsova	6^{4}	6^{2}
(Slovenia) A Klepač	6	2	4
2	(Poland) A Radwańska	1	6	6

Semifinals
8	(Bulgaria) T Pironkova	6^{1}	6	1
2	(Poland) A Radwańska	7	3	6
