= 2012 Toray Pan Pacific Open – Singles =

Singles
- 2012 Toray Pan Pacific Open

Final
- Champion: (Russia) Nadia Petrova
- Runner-up: (Poland) Agnieszka Radwańska
- Score: 6–0, 1–6, 6–3

Details
- Draw: 56 (8 Q / 3 WC )
- Seeds: 16

Events
Singles	Doubles
- Pan Pacific Open

Nadia Petrova defeated the defending champion Agnieszka Radwańska in the final, 6–0, 1–6, 6–3 to win the singles tennis title at the 2012 Pan Pacific Open.

== Seeds ==
The top eight seeds receive a bye into the second round.

1. (Belarus) Victoria Azarenka (quarterfinals, withdrew because of dizziness)
2. (Russia) Maria Sharapova (quarterfinals)
3. (Poland) Agnieszka Radwańska (final)
4. (Czech Republic) Petra Kvitová (second round)
5. (Germany) Angelique Kerber (semifinals)
6. (Italy) Sara Errani (quarterfinals)
7. (China) Li Na (third round)
8. (Australia) Samantha Stosur (semifinals)
9. (France) Marion Bartoli (third round)
10. (Denmark) Caroline Wozniacki (quarterfinals)
11. (Serbia) Ana Ivanovic (second round)
12. (Slovakia) Dominika Cibulková (third round)
13. (Russia) Maria Kirilenko (withdrew because of a back injury)
14. (Italy) Roberta Vinci (third round)
15. (Estonia) Kaia Kanepi (second round)
16. (Czech Republic) Lucie Šafářová (third round)
17. (Russia) Nadia Petrova (champion)

== Draw ==
Key

- Q = Qualifier
- WC = Wild card
- LL = Lucky loser
- Alt = Alternate
- ITF = ITF entry
- PR = Protected ranking
- SR = Special ranking
- SE = Special exempt
- JE = Junior exempt
- JR = Junior Accelerator Programme entrant
- CO = College Accelerator Programme entrant
- NG = Next Gen Accelerator Program entrant
- w/o = Walkover
- r = Retired
- d = Defaulted

=== Finals ===
Quarterfinals
1	(Belarus) Victoria Azarenka
5	(Germany) Angelique Kerber	w/o
3	(Poland) Agnieszka Radwańska	6	6
10	(Denmark) Caroline Wozniacki	4	3
6	(Italy) Sara Errani	6	5	3
17	(Russia) Nadia Petrova	3	7	6
8	(Australia) Samantha Stosur	6	7^{12}
2	(Russia) Maria Sharapova	4	6^{10}

Semifinals
5	(Germany) Angelique Kerber	1	1
3	(Poland) Agnieszka Radwańska	6	6
17	(Russia) Nadia Petrova	6	6
8	(Australia) Samantha Stosur	4	2

Final
3	(Poland) Agnieszka Radwańska	0	6	3
17	(Russia) Nadia Petrova	6	1	6

=== Top half ===
==== Section 1 ====
First round
(Austria) T Paszek	6	6
Q	(Italy) C Giorgi	4	3
(France) A Cornet	3	4
Q	(France) P Parmentier	6	6
(Czech Republic) B Záhlavová-Strýcová	4	6	5
14	(Italy) R Vinci	6	4	7
11	(Serbia) A Ivanovic	6	2
LL	(Czech Republic) A Hlaváčková	3	0^{r}
Q	(Japan) K Nara	2	4
(Poland) U Radwańska	6	6
(Romania) S Cîrstea	2	6	2
WC	(Japan) A Morita	6	3	6

Second round
1	(Belarus) V Azarenka	6	6
(Austria) T Paszek	1	1
Q	(France) P Parmentier	3	1
14	(Italy) R Vinci	6	6
11	(Serbia) A Ivanovic	6	4	2
(Poland) U Radwańska	3	6	6
WC	(Japan) A Morita	3	4
5	(Germany) A Kerber	6	6

Third round
1	(Belarus) V Azarenka	6	6
14	(Italy) R Vinci	4	2
(Poland) U Radwańska	1	1
5	(Germany) A Kerber	6	6

Quarterfinals
1	(Belarus) V Azarenka
5	(Germany) A Kerber	w/o

==== Section 2 ====
First round
(Belgium) Y Wickmayer	3	3
(Serbia) J Janković	6	6
WC	(France) C Garcia	2	2
Q	(United States) J Hampton	6	6
Q	(Spain) S Soler Espinosa	1	4
15	(Estonia) K Kanepi	6	6
10	(Denmark) C Wozniacki	6	3	6
Q	(Serbia) B Jovanovski	0	6	4
(Russia) E Makarova	4	6	3
(Slovakia) D Hantuchová	6	4	6
(Russia) A Pavlyuchenkova	6	4	7
(South Africa) C Scheepers	4	6	5

Second round
3	(Poland) A Radwańska	6	7
(Serbia) J Janković	2	5
Q	(United States) J Hampton	5	6	6
15	(Estonia) K Kanepi	7	2	3
10	(Denmark) C Wozniacki	7^{7}	6
(Slovakia) D Hantuchová	6^{3}	1
(Russia) A Pavlyuchenkova	5	6	2
7	(China) N Li	7	4	6

Third round
3	(Poland) A Radwańska	6	6
Q	(United States) J Hampton	4	3
10	(Denmark) C Wozniacki	4	6	6
7	(China) N Li	6	3	4

Quarterfinals
3	(Poland) A Radwańska	6	6
10	(Denmark) C Wozniacki	4	3

=== Bottom half ===
==== Section 3 ====
First round
(Switzerland) R Oprandi	3	6	5
Q	(Sweden) J Larsson	6	3	7
(Germany) J Görges	6	6
(Romania) M Niculescu	3	2
WC	(Japan) K Date-Krumm	1	4
9	(France) M Bartoli	6	6
17	(Russia) N Petrova	6	6
(China) S Peng	1	4
(Romania) S Halep	6	6
(Spain) C Suárez Navarro	2	3
(Croatia) P Martić	0	6	6
(Germany) A Petkovic	6	4	3

Second round
6	(Italy) S Errani	6	7^{7}
Q	(Sweden) J Larsson	3	6^{1}
(Germany) J Görges	2	5
9	(France) M Bartoli	6	7
17	(Russia) N Petrova	7^{7}	6
(Romania) S Halep	6^{4}	0
(Croatia) P Martić	6	6
4	(Czech Republic) P Kvitová	4	4

Third round
6	(Italy) S Errani	3	6	6
9	(France) M Bartoli	6	2	2
17	(Russia) N Petrova	7^{7}	6^{1}	6
(Croatia) P Martić	6^{2}	7^{7}	4

Quarterfinals
6	(Italy) S Errani	6	5	3
17	(Russia) N Petrova	3	7	6

==== Section 4 ====
First round
(Kazakhstan) Y Shvedova	6	6^{4}	4
(Italy) F Schiavone	4	7^{7}	6
(China) J Zheng	6	6
(United States) V King	3	4
(Spain) A Medina Garrigues	3	6^{3}
12	(Slovakia) D Cibulková	6	7^{7}
16	(Czech Republic) L Šafářová	6	7^{7}
(Bulgaria) T Pironkova	4	6^{3}
(Chinese Taipei) S-w Hsieh	3	7^{10}	1
(Czech Republic) K Zakopalová	6	6^{8}	6
(Germany) S Lisicki	4	6^{3}
Q	(United Kingdom) H Watson	6	7^{7}

Second round
8	(Australia) S Stosur	4	6	7
(Italy) F Schiavone	6	2	5
(China) J Zheng	0	3
12	(Slovakia) D Cibulková	6	6
16	(Czech Republic) L Šafářová	w/o
(Czech Republic) K Zakopalová
Q	(United Kingdom) H Watson	7^{9}	3	4
2	(Russia) M Sharapova	6^{7}	6	6

Third round
8	(Australia) S Stosur	6	7
12	(Slovakia) D Cibulková	4	5
16	(Czech Republic) L Šafářová	2	6^{5}
2	(Russia) M Sharapova	6	7^{7}

Quarterfinals
8	(Australia) S Stosur	6	7^{12}
2	(Russia) M Sharapova	4	6^{10}

== Qualifying ==
=== Seeds ===
1. (Slovakia) Magdaléna Rybáriková (first round)
2. (Serbia) Bojana Jovanovski (qualified)
3. (Hungary) Tímea Babos (first round)
4. (Czech Republic) 'Andrea Hlaváčková (qualifying competition, lucky loser)
5. (Netherlands) Kiki Bertens (withdrew, still competing at Seoul)
6. (Luxembourg) Mandy Minella (qualifying competition)
7. (Spain) Lourdes Domínguez Lino (first round)
8. (Kazakhstan) Galina Voskoboeva (qualifying competition)
9. (United Kingdom) Laura Robson (withdrew, still competing at Guangzhou)
10. (United Kingdom) Heather Watson (qualified)
11. (Slovenia) Polona Hercog (first round)
12. (Australia) Casey Dellacqua (first round)
13. (Spain) Sílvia Soler Espinosa (qualified)
14. (France) Pauline Parmentier (qualified)
15. (Romania) Alexandra Cadanțu (first round)
16. (Sweden) Johanna Larsson (qualified)
17. (United States) CoCo Vandeweghe (first round)

=== Qualifiers ===
1. (United States) Jamie Hampton
2. (Serbia) Bojana Jovanovski
3. (France) Pauline Parmentier
4. (United Kingdom) Heather Watson
5. (Sweden) Johanna Larsson
6. (Spain) Sílvia Soler Espinosa
7. (Japan) Kurumi Nara
8. (Italy) Camila Giorgi

=== Lucky losers ===
1. (Czech Republic) Andrea Hlaváčková

=== Draw ===
==== First qualifier ====
First round
1	(Slovakia) Magdaléna Rybáriková	5	4
(United States) Jamie Hampton	7	6
WC	(France) Virginie Razzano	6	6
15	(Romania) Alexandra Cadanțu	3	2

Qualifying competition
(United States) Jamie Hampton	6	7^{7}
WC	(France) Virginie Razzano	1	6^{3}

==== Second qualifier ====
First round
2	(Serbia) Bojana Jovanovski	2	6	7^{7}
(United States) Julia Cohen	6	0	6^{3}
(Spain) Garbiñe Muguruza	7^{7}	3	6
12	(Australia) Casey Dellacqua	6^{5}	6	2

Qualifying competition
2	(Serbia) Bojana Jovanovski	6	6
(Spain) Garbiñe Muguruza	3	3

==== Third qualifier ====
First round
3	(Hungary) Tímea Babos	2	2
(Russia) Nina Bratchikova	6	6
WC	(Japan) Misaki Doi	6^{6}	1
14	(France) Pauline Parmentier	7^{8}	6

Qualifying competition
(Russia) Nina Bratchikova	2	6	4
14	(France) Pauline Parmentier	6	2	6

==== Fourth qualifier ====
First round
4	(Czech Republic) Andrea Hlaváčková	6	7^{7}
Alt	(Japan) Erika Sema	3	6^{3}
(Spain) Lara Arruabarrena Vecino	4	6^{4}
10	(United Kingdom) Heather Watson	6	7^{7}

Qualifying competition
4	(Czech Republic) Andrea Hlaváčková	7	3	2
10	(United Kingdom) Heather Watson	5	6	6

==== Fifth qualifier ====
First round
Alt	(Russia) Valeria Savinykh	6^{5}	7^{7}	2
(Kazakhstan) Sesil Karatantcheva	7^{7}	6^{4}	6
(Spain) María José Martínez Sánchez	4	1
16	(Sweden) Johanna Larsson	6	6

Qualifying competition
(Kazakhstan) Sesil Karatantcheva	6	5	3
16	(Sweden) Johanna Larsson	1	7	6

==== Sixth qualifier ====
First round
6	(Luxembourg) Mandy Minella	7^{7}	6
Alt	(Hungary) Gréta Arn	6^{0}	0
(Hungary) Melinda Czink	6	2	4^{r}
13	(Spain) Sílvia Soler Espinosa	4	6	3

Qualifying competition
6	(Luxembourg) Mandy Minella	3	3
13	(Spain) Sílvia Soler Espinosa	6	6

==== Seventh qualifier ====
First round
7	(Spain) Lourdes Domínguez Lino	6	4	0
(Greece) Eleni Daniilidou	4	6	6
WC	(Japan) Kurumi Nara	6	6
11/WC	(Slovenia) Polona Hercog	1	4

Qualifying competition
(Greece) Eleni Daniilidou	2	6	3
WC	(Japan) Kurumi Nara	6	2	6

==== Eighth qualifier ====
First round
8	(Kazakhstan) Galina Voskoboeva	6	3	6
(Croatia) Mirjana Lučić	3	6	3
(Italy) Camila Giorgi	4	7^{8}	6
17	(United States) CoCo Vandeweghe	6	6^{6}	2

Qualifying competition
8	(Kazakhstan) Galina Voskoboeva	0	4
(Italy) Camila Giorgi	6	6
