= İstanbul Cup =

Defunct tennis tournament
- Founded: 2005
- Editions: 15 (2022)
- Location: Istanbul; Turkey
- Venue: Holiday-Inn Crowne Plaza – Ataköy Marina (2005); Tekstilkent Arena (2006–08); ENKA Sports Club (2009–10); Koza World of Sports (2014–19); TTF Istanbul Tennis Center (2020–)
- Category: Tier III (2005–2008), WTA International (2009–2010, 2014–2020), WTA 250 (2021–2022)
- Surface: Clay - outdoors (2005–08, 2016–2022); Hard - outdoors (2009–10, 2014–15)
- Draw: 32S / 24Q / 16D
- Prize money: US$251,750 (2022)
- Website: tennischampionship.istanbul

Current champions (2022)
- Singles: Anastasia Potapova
- Doubles: (Czech Republic) Marie Bouzková (Spain) Sara Sorribes Tormo

The İstanbul Cup, known as the TEB BNP Paribas Tennis Championship İstanbul (for sponsorship reasons), was a WTA tennis tournament held in Istanbul, Turkey, organised for professional female tennis players. It was classified as an International-level tournament on the WTA Tour. Held annually since May 2005, it was played on outdoor clay courts until 2009, after which the organisers decided to switch the surface to outdoor hard courts. It was not held in between 2011–2013, due to the WTA Tour Championships moving to Istanbul for those years. It resumed for the 2014 WTA season. In 2016, the tournament surface was changed back to clay. It was played at the TTF Istanbul Tennis Center, located in the İstinye neighborhood.

== Past finals ==
=== Singles ===
| Year | Champion | Runner-up | Score |
|---|---|---|---|
| 2005 | (United States) Venus Williams | (Czech Republic) Nicole Vaidišová | 6–3, 6–2 |
| 2006 | (Israel) Shahar Pe'er | (Russia) Anastasia Myskina | 1–6, 6–3, 7–6^{(7–3)} |
| 2007 | (Russia) Elena Dementieva | (France) Aravane Rezaï | 7–6^{(7–5)}, 3–0 ret. |
| 2008 | (Poland) Agnieszka Radwańska | (Russia) Elena Dementieva | 6–3, 6–2 |
| 2009 | (Russia) Vera Dushevina | (Czech Republic) Lucie Hradecká | 6–0, 6–1 |
| 2010 | (Russia) Anastasia Pavlyuchenkova | (Russia) Elena Vesnina | 5–7, 7–5, 6–4 |
| 2011–2013 | Not held because of the WTA Tour Championships | | |
| 2014 | (Denmark) Caroline Wozniacki | (Italy) Roberta Vinci | 6–1, 6–1 |
| 2015 | (Ukraine) Lesia Tsurenko | (Poland) Urszula Radwańska | 7–5, 6–1 |
| 2016 | (Turkey) Çağla Büyükakçay | (Montenegro) Danka Kovinić | 3–6, 6–2, 6–3 |
| 2017 | (Ukraine) Elina Svitolina | (Belgium) Elise Mertens | 6–2, 6–4 |
| 2018 | (France) Pauline Parmentier | (Slovenia) Polona Hercog | 6–4, 3–6, 6–3 |
| 2019 | (Croatia) Petra Martić | (Czech Republic) Markéta Vondroušová | 1–6, 6–4, 6–1 |
| 2020 | (Romania) Patricia Maria Țig | (Canada) Eugenie Bouchard | 2–6, 6–1, 7–6^{(7–4)} |
| 2021 | (Romania) Sorana Cîrstea | (Belgium) Elise Mertens | 6–1, 7–6^{(7–3)} |
| 2022 | Anastasia Potapova | Veronika Kudermetova | 6–3, 6–1 |

=== Doubles ===
| Year | Champions | Runners-up | Score |
|---|---|---|---|
| 2005 | (Spain) Marta Marrero (Italy) Antonella Serra Zanetti | (Austria) Daniela Klemenschits (Austria) Sandra Klemenschits | 6–4, 6–0 |
| 2006 | (Ukraine) Alona Bondarenko (Belarus) Anastasiya Yakimova | (India) Sania Mirza (Australia) Alicia Molik | 6–2, 6–4 |
| 2007 | (Poland) Agnieszka Radwańska (Poland) Urszula Radwańska | (Chinese Taipei) Chan Yung-jan (India) Sania Mirza | 6–1, 6–3 |
| 2008 | (United States) Jill Craybas (Belarus) Olga Govortsova | (New Zealand) Marina Erakovic (Slovenia) Polona Hercog | 6–1, 6–2 |
| 2009 | (Czech Republic) Lucie Hradecká (Czech Republic) Renata Voráčová | (Germany) Julia Görges (Switzerland) Patty Schnyder | 2–6, 6–3, [12–10] |
| 2010 | (Greece) Eleni Daniilidou (Germany) Jasmin Wöhr | (Russia) Maria Kondratieva (Czech Republic) Vladimíra Uhlířová | 6–4, 1–6, [11–9] |
| 2011–2013 | Not held because of the WTA Tour Championships | | |
| 2014 | (Japan) Misaki Doi (Ukraine) Elina Svitolina | (Georgia (country)) Oksana Kalashnikova (Poland) Paula Kania | 6–4, 6–0 |
| 2015 | (Russia) Daria Gavrilova (Ukraine) Elina Svitolina (2) | (Turkey) Çağla Büyükakçay (Serbia) Jelena Janković | 5–7, 6–1, [10–4] |
| 2016 | (Romania) Andreea Mitu (Turkey) İpek Soylu | (Switzerland) Xenia Knoll (Montenegro) Danka Kovinić | w/o |
| 2017 | (Slovenia) Dalila Jakupović (Ukraine) Nadiia Kichenok | (United States) Nicole Melichar (Belgium) Elise Mertens | 7–6^{(8–6)}, 6–2 |
| 2018 | (China) Liang Chen (China) Zhang Shuai | (Switzerland) Xenia Knoll (United Kingdom) Anna Smith | 6–4, 6–4 |
| 2019 | (Hungary) Tímea Babos (France) Kristina Mladenovic | (Chile) Alexa Guarachi (United States) Sabrina Santamaria | 6–1, 6–0 |
| 2020 | (Chile) Alexa Guarachi (United States) Desirae Krawczyk | (Australia) Ellen Perez (Australia) Storm Sanders | 6–1, 6–3 |
| 2021 | (Russia) Veronika Kudermetova (Belgium) Elise Mertens | (Japan) Nao Hibino (Japan) Makoto Ninomiya | 6–1, 6–1 |
| 2022 | (Czech Republic) Marie Bouzková (Spain) Sara Sorribes Tormo | Natela Dzalamidze; Kamilla Rakhimova | 6–3, 6–4 |

== See also ==
- Istanbul Open – men's tournament (2015–2018)
- ENKA Ladies Open – women's tournament (1998)
- List of tennis tournaments
