= 2020 İstanbul Cup – Singles =

Singles
- 2020 İstanbul Cup

Final
- Champion: (Romania) Patricia Maria Țig
- Runner-up: (Canada) Eugenie Bouchard
- Score: 2–6, 6–1, 7–6^{(7–4)}

Details
- Draw: 30
- Seeds: 8

Events
Singles	Doubles
← 2019 ·	İstanbul Cup	· 2021 →

Petra Martić was the defending champion, but she chose not to participate as she was still competing at the 2020 US Open.

Patricia Maria Țig won her maiden WTA tour-level singles title, defeating Eugenie Bouchard in the final, 2–6, 6–1, 7–6^{(7–4)}.

== Seeds ==
1. (Russia) Svetlana Kuznetsova (second round)
2. (Sweden) Rebecca Peterson (quarterfinals)
3. (Slovenia) Polona Hercog (quarterfinals)
4. (France) Caroline Garcia (second round)
5. (United Kingdom) Heather Watson (first round, retired)
6. (Belgium) Alison Van Uytvanck (second round)
7. (Kazakhstan) Zarina Diyas (first round)
8. (Japan) Misaki Doi (second round)

== Draw ==
=== Key ===
- Q = Qualifier
- WC = Wild card
- LL = Lucky loser
- Alt = Alternate
- SE = Special exempt
- PR = Protected ranking
- ITF = ITF entry
- JE = Junior exempt
- w/o = Walkover
- r = Retired
- d = Defaulted
- SR = Special ranking

=== Finals ===
Semifinals
Q	(Canada) Eugenie Bouchard	6	6
(Spain) Paula Badosa	3	2
Q	(Czech Republic) Tereza Martincová	3	3
(Romania) Patricia Maria Țig	6	6

Final
Q	(Canada) Eugenie Bouchard	6	1	6^{4}
(Romania) Patricia Maria Țig	2	6	7^{7}

=== Top half ===
First round
(Bulgaria) V Tomova	2	4
Q	(Canada) E Bouchard	6	6
PR	(Ukraine) K Bondarenko	5	2
(Montenegro) D Kovinić	7	6
(Slovakia) V Kužmová	3	4
6	(Belgium) A Van Uytvanck	6	6
3	(Slovenia) P Hercog	6	6
WC	(Turkey) B Cengiz	2	3
(Italy) J Paolini	6	4	6
(Switzerland) S Vögele	1	6	3
(Ukraine) K Zavatska	1	2
(Spain) P Badosa	6	6
(Spain) S Sorribes Tormo	3
5	(United Kingdom) H Watson	2^{r}

Second round
1	(Russia) S Kuznetsova	6^{3}	7^{7}	2
Q	(Canada) E Bouchard	7^{7}	6^{5}	6
(Montenegro) D Kovinić	6	6
6	(Belgium) A Van Uytvanck	3	4
3	(Slovenia) P Hercog	7	6
(Italy) J Paolini	5	4
(Spain) P Badosa	6	6
(Spain) S Sorribes Tormo	1	4

Quarterfinals
Q	(Canada) E Bouchard	3	6	7
(Montenegro) D Kovinić	6	4	5
3	(Slovenia) P Hercog	6	3	4
(Spain) P Badosa	4	6	6

Semifinals
Q	(Canada) E Bouchard	6	6
(Spain) P Badosa	3	2

=== Bottom half ===
First round
7	(Kazakhstan) Z Diyas	6	5	1
(Belarus) A Sasnovich	3	7	6
PR	(Slovakia) AK Schmiedlová	7	1	6
(Slovenia) K Juvan	5	6	4
(Belgium) G Minnen	6^{5}	3
Q	(Czech Republic) T Martincová	7^{7}	6
WC	(Turkey) Ç Büyükakçay	4	6	5
4	(France) C Garcia	6	0	7
8	(Japan) M Doi	6^{4}	7	6
Q	(Australia) E Perez	7^{7}	5	1
Q	(Serbia) O Danilović	3	5
(Romania) PM Țig	6	7
WC	(Turkey) P Özgen	2	0
(Russia) M Gasparyan	6	6

Second round
(Belarus) A Sasnovich	6^{5}	6	6
PR	(Slovakia) AK Schmiedlová	7^{7}	4	3
Q	(Czech Republic) T Martincová	6	6
4	(France) C Garcia	1	4
8	(Japan) M Doi	2	0
(Romania) PM Țig	6	6
(Russia) M Gasparyan	2^{r}
2	(Sweden) R Peterson	3

Quarterfinals
(Belarus) A Sasnovich	2	3
Q	(Czech Republic) T Martincová	6	6
(Romania) PM Țig	6	6
2	(Sweden) R Peterson	3	1

Semifinals
Q	(Czech Republic) T Martincová	3	3
(Romania) PM Țig	6	6

== Qualifying ==
=== Seeds ===
1. (Switzerland) Stefanie Vögele (moved to main draw)
2. (Russia) Margarita Gasparyan (moved to main draw)
3. (Bulgaria) Viktoriya Tomova (moved to main draw)
4. (Czech Republic) Tereza Martincová (qualified)
5. (Ukraine) Marta Kostyuk (withdrew)
6. (Italy) Elisabetta Cocciaretto (qualifying competition)
7. (United Kingdom) Harriet Dart (qualifying competition)
8. (Switzerland) Leonie Küng (qualifying competition)

=== Qualifiers ===
1. (Canada) Eugenie Bouchard
2. (Australia) Ellen Perez
3. (Serbia) Olga Danilović
4. (Czech Republic) Tereza Martincová

=== Draw ===
==== First qualifier ====
First round
Alt	(Serbia) Ivana Jorović	2	6^{9}
WC	(Canada) Eugenie Bouchard	6	7^{11}
(Italy) Giulia Gatto-Monticone	7^{7}	3	3
8	(Switzerland) Leonie Küng	6^{3}	6	6

Qualifying competition
WC	(Canada) Eugenie Bouchard	6	6
8	(Switzerland) Leonie Küng	4	4

==== Second qualifier ====
First round
Alt	(Australia) Ellen Perez	7^{7}	7^{9}
(Australia) Arina Rodionova	6^{4}	6^{7}
(Turkey) Başak Eraydın	3	6	0
7	(United Kingdom) Harriet Dart	6	2	6

Qualifying competition
Alt	(Australia) Ellen Perez	2	6	6
7	(United Kingdom) Harriet Dart	6	1	3

==== Third qualifier ====
First round
Alt	(Serbia) Dejana Radanović	6	6
(Netherlands) Indy de Vroome	4	1
(Serbia) Olga Danilović	6	6
Alt	(Romania) Laura Ioana Paar	1	1

Qualifying competition
Alt	(Serbia) Dejana Radanović	2	0
(Serbia) Olga Danilović	6	6

==== Fourth qualifier ====
First round
4	(Czech Republic) Tereza Martincová	4
WC	(Turkey) Zeynep Sönmez	1^{r}
(Netherlands) Bibiane Schoofs	1	7^{7}	5
6	(Italy) Elisabetta Cocciaretto	6	6^{3}	7

Qualifying competition
4	(Czech Republic) Tereza Martincová	5	7	6
6	(Italy) Elisabetta Cocciaretto	7	5	3
