= 2012 Qatar Airways Tournament of Champions =

- Date: 30 October – 4 November
- Edition: 4th
- Category: WTA Tournament of Champions
- Surface: Hard / indoor
- Location: Sofia, Bulgaria

Champions

Singles
- (Russia) Nadia Petrova
- WTA Tournament of Champions

The 2012 Qatar Airways Tournament of Champions was a singles-only tennis tournament that was played on indoor hard courts in Sofia. It was the fourth edition of the tournament and was part of the 2012 WTA Tour. The 2012 edition was the first held in Sofia, having been relocated from Bali, where the tournament was held for the previous three years and called the Commonwealth Bank Tournament of Champions. The tournament was played between October 30 and November 4. Ana Ivanovic did not defend her title this year for two reasons: She did not win, or reach, a single final this year in order to gain direct acceptance, and she did not receive a wild card due to her participation in the 2012 Fed Cup finals.

== Tournament ==
The 2012 WTA Tournament of Champions was the fourth edition of the event and the first in Sofia. The tournament was run by the Women's Tennis Association (WTA) and was part of the 2012 WTA Tour. It was the season ending championships for players who have won one of the WTA International tournaments but have not qualified for the WTA Championships. The singles draw saw eight women qualify from the year, and began as a round robin event, split into two groups of four, with the top four ranked players seeded. Over the first four days of competition, each player met the other three players in their group, with the top two in each group advancing to the semifinals. The first-placed player in one group met the second-placed player in the other group, and vice versa. The winners of each semifinal met in the championship match.

== Prize money and points ==
The total prize money for the 2012 Qatar Airways Tournament of Champions was US$750,000.

Stage	Singles	Points ^{1}
Champion	RR^{2} + 190,000	RR^{2} + 195
Runner-up	RR^{2} + 65,000	RR^{2} + 75
Semifinalist	RR^{2} + 10,000	RR^{2}
Round Robin (3 wins)	80,000	180
Round Robin (2 wins)	65,000	145
Round Robin (1 win)	50,000	110
Round Robin (0 wins)	35,000	75

- ^{1} for every match played in the round robin a player gets 25 points automatically, and for each round robin win they get 35 additional points
- ^{2} RR means Prize money or Points won in the Round Robin Round.
- ^{3} Alternates receive $7,500 in prize money, even if they do not participate.

== Qualifying ==
The six highest-ranked players who have captured at least one International tournament during the year and who are not participating in singles at the year-end WTA Championships in Istanbul or the finals of the Fed Cup will automatically qualify for the event. The last two players are wildcards. The wildcards were awarded to Tsvetana Pironkova and Maria Kirilenko.

=== 2012 WTA International tournaments champions ===
Player	Nationality	Tournament/s Won
Zheng Jie	CHN	(New Zealand) Auckland
Mona Barthel	GER	(Australia) Hobart
Daniela Hantuchová	SVK	(Thailand) Pattaya City
Lara Arruabarrena-Vecino	ESP	(Colombia) Bogotá
Sofia Arvidsson	SWE	(United States) Memphis
Tímea Babos	HUN	(Mexico) Monterrey
Hsieh Su-wei	TPE	(Malaysia) Kuala Lumpur (China) Guangzhou
Angelique Kerber	GER	(Denmark) Copenhagen
Kiki Bertens	NED	(Morocco) Fes
Kaia Kanepi	EST	(Portugal) Estoril
Francesca Schiavone	ITA	(France) Strasbourg
Alizé Cornet	FRA	(Austria) Bad Gastein
Melanie Oudin	USA	(United Kingdom) Birmingham
Nadia Petrova	RUS	(Netherlands) 's-Hertogenbosch
Sara Errani	ITA	(Mexico) Acapulco (Spain) Barcelona (Hungary) Budapest (Italy) Palermo
Polona Hercog	SLO	(Sweden) Båstad
Bojana Jovanovski	SRB	(Azerbaijan) Baku
Magdaléna Rybáriková	SVK	(United States) Washington, D.C.
Roberta Vinci	ITA	(United States) Dallas
Irina-Camelia Begu	ROU	(Uzbekistan) Tashkent
Kirsten Flipkens	BEL	(Canada) Quebec City
Caroline Wozniacki	DEN	(South Korea) Seoul
Heather Watson	GBR	(Japan) Osaka
Victoria Azarenka	BLR	(Austria) Linz
Venus Williams	USA	Luxembourg

=== Qualifiers ===
WTA-Race Singles rankings (22 October 2012)
Sd	Player	Rk	Won
1	(Denmark) Caroline Wozniacki	11	(South Korea) Seoul
2	(Russia) Nadia Petrova	13	(Netherlands) 's-Hertogenbosch
3	(Russia) Maria Kirilenko	15	Wildcard
4	(Italy) Roberta Vinci	16	(United States) Dallas
	(Estonia) Kaia Kanepi	19	(Portugal) Estoril
	(United States) Venus Williams	24	Luxembourg
5	(Chinese Taipei) Hsieh Su-wei	25	(Malaysia) Kuala Lumpur (China) Guangzhou
6	(China) Zheng Jie	29	(New Zealand) Auckland
7	(Slovakia) Daniela Hantuchová	32	(Thailand) Pattaya City
8	(Bulgaria) Tsvetana Pironkova	44	Wildcard

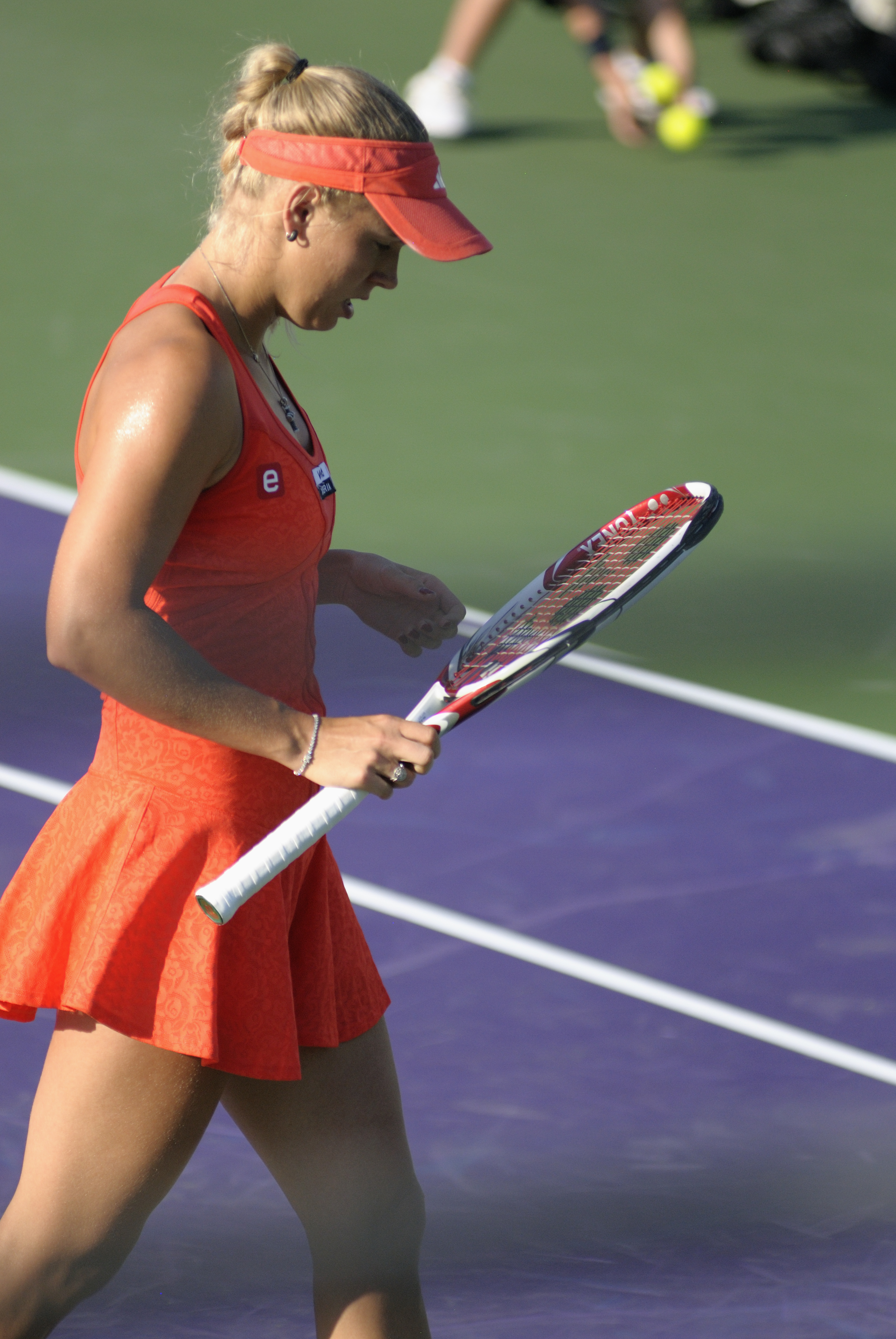
Caroline Wozniacki won in Seoul.

Caroline Wozniacki

Wozniacki began the year as the world no. 1; she lost her top ranking after the Australian Open after losing in the quarterfinals to Kim Clijsters 3-6, 6-7^{(4–7)}. She did not reach a final until the e-Boks Open, where she was the two-time defending champion but lost to Angelique Kerber 4–6, 4–6. At the French Open, she lost to Kaia Kanepi 1-6, 7-6^{(7–3)}, 3-6. At Wimbledon, she was upset by Tamira Paszek 7-5, 6-7^{(4–7)}, 4-6 in the first round. At the US Open, after reaching the semifinals the previous year, she lost in the first round 2-6, 2-6, which dropped her ranking out of the top 10 for the first time since 2009. She won her first title of the year at KDB Korea Open, defeating Kaia Kanepi 6-1, 6-0. A few weeks later, she continued her good form and won the title at Kremlin Cup, claiming victory over Samantha Stosur 6–2, 4–6, 7–5, coming back from 1–4 in the final set. She is making her debut to the event.

Nadia Petrova
Petrova was competing for the second time, having reached the semifinals the previous year. She qualified for the event by winning the UNICEF Open, her first grass title defeating Urszula Radwańska 6-4, 6-3 in the final. She won her second title of the year at the Toray Pan Pacific Open, her first Premier 5 title since its inception, defeating defending champion Agnieszka Radwańska 6–0, 1–6, 6–3. At the slams, she reached the second round of the Australian Open, losing to Sara Errani 2-6, 2-6. She then lost in the third rounds of Wimbledon to Samantha Stosur 3-6, 3-6 and French Open to Camila Giorgi 3-6, 6-7^{(6-8)}. At the US Open, she reached the fourth round, falling to Maria Sharapova 1-6, 6-4, 4-6. She had huge top ten wins over Samantha Stosur and Sara Errani.

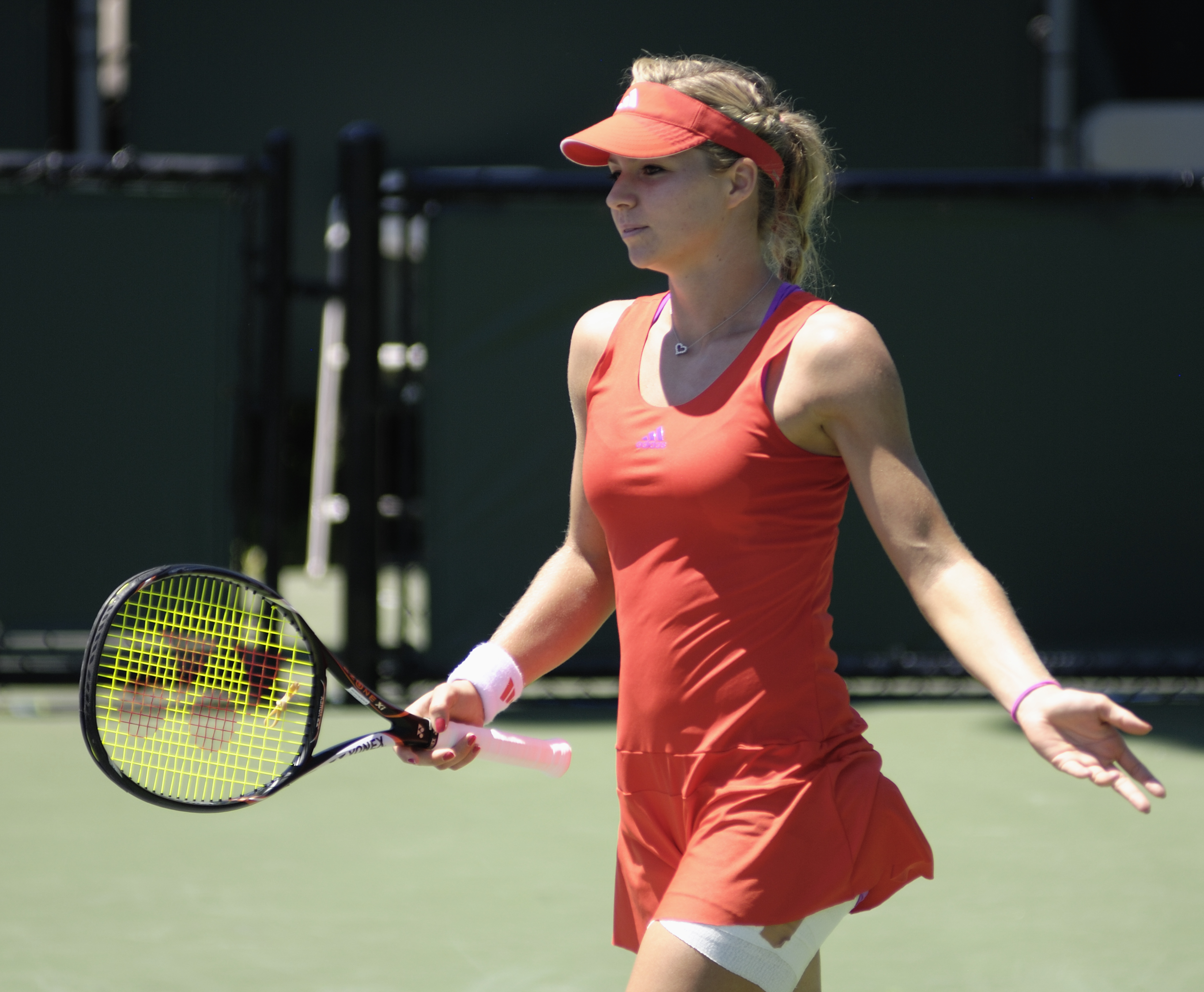
Maria Kirilenko competing for the first time

Maria Kirilenko
Kirilenko was one of the two wild card recipients in the event. Kirilenko did not win a title in the year. However, she was able to reach two finals in the year the first of which was in the Pattaya City, losing to Daniela Hantuchová 7-6^{(7-4)}, 3-6, 3-6. She reached her second final at the New Haven Open at Yale losing to Petra Kvitová 6-7^{(9-11)}, 5-7, despite leading 5-2 in the second set. She was able to reach the quarterfinals of Wimbledon losing to Agnieszka Radwańska 5-7, 6-4, 5-7 in a rain delayed match. At the Olympics she ended 4th place losing the Bronze Medal Match to Victoria Azarenka 3-6, 4-6. At the other slams, she lost in the third rounds of the Australian Open retiring against Kvitová 0-6, 0-1 and of the US Open losing to Andrea Hlaváčková 7-5, 4-6, 4-6. She also reached the second round of the French Open losing to Klára Zakopalová 4-6, 6-3, 3-6. Her biggest win came in the quarterfinals of the Olympics over Kvitová.

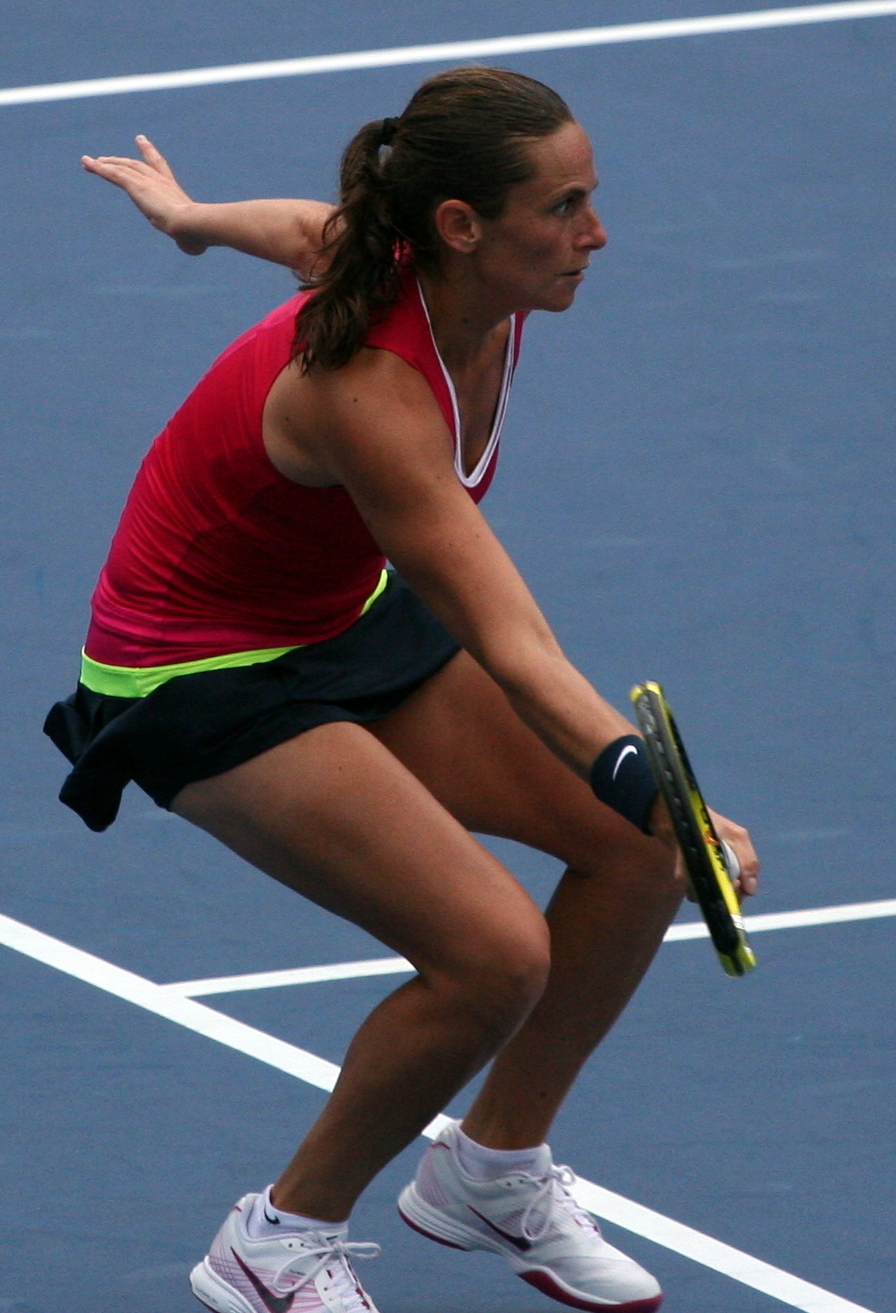
Roberta Vinci reached no. 1 in doubles

Roberta Vinci
Vinci is participating for the second time after 2011. She qualified to the event by winning the Texas Tennis Open defeating Jelena Janković 7-5, 6-3 in the final and without dropping a set in the tournament. She then reached her first slam quarterfinal at the US Open after defeating world no. 2Agnieszka Radwańska 6-1, 6-4 before losing to doubles partner Sara Errani 2-6, 4-6. In the other slams, she lost in the second round of the Australian Open to Zheng Jie 4-6, 2-6, first round of the French Open losing to Sofia Arvidsson 2-6, 6-4, 3-6, and the fourth round of Wimbledon losing to Tamira Paszek 2-6, 2-6. She earned another top ten win over world no. 7 Angelique Kerber 6-2, 7-6^{(9-7)}.

Hsieh Su-wei
Hsieh is having a breakthrough season, she started out of the top 100. She won her first ever WTA Tour singles title in the Malaysian Open as a qualifier over Petra Martić after Martić retired when Hsieh was leading 2-6 7-5 4-1 due to fatigue from playing 3 hours earlier in the day. This made her eligible to qualify for the event She also won the Guangzhou International Women's Open defeating Britain's Laura Robson 6-3, 5-7, 6-4, after coming back from 0-3 in the deciding set. She also won 3 ITF titles in the year. In the slams, she lost in the first rounds of the French Open to Flavia Pennetta 7-6^{(7-3)}, 4-6, 2-6, and of the US Open to Magdaléna Rybáriková 3-6, 6-2, 3-6, she also advanced to the third round of Wimbledon before losing to World No. 1 Maria Sharapova 1-6, 4-6.

Zheng Jie
Zheng had a stellar start of the year by winning the ASB Classic over Flavia Pennetta after the Italian retired while Zheng was leading 2-6, 6-3, 2-0. This win made her viable to qualify for the event. She continued to have a good form coming into the Australian Open upsetting then world no. 9 Marion Bartoli 6-3, 6-3 in the third round before losing to Sara Errani 2-6, 1-6 in the following round. At the other slams, she lost in the second round to Aleksandra Wozniak in the French Open 2-6, 4-6. She also lost in the third rounds of Wimbledon to Serena Williams 7-6^{(7-5)}, 2-6, 7-9 and of the French Open to world no. 1 Victoria Azarenka 0-6, 1-6. Zheng was able to participate because of the earlier injury-induced withdrawal of qualifier Kaia Kanepi, who was higher ranked.

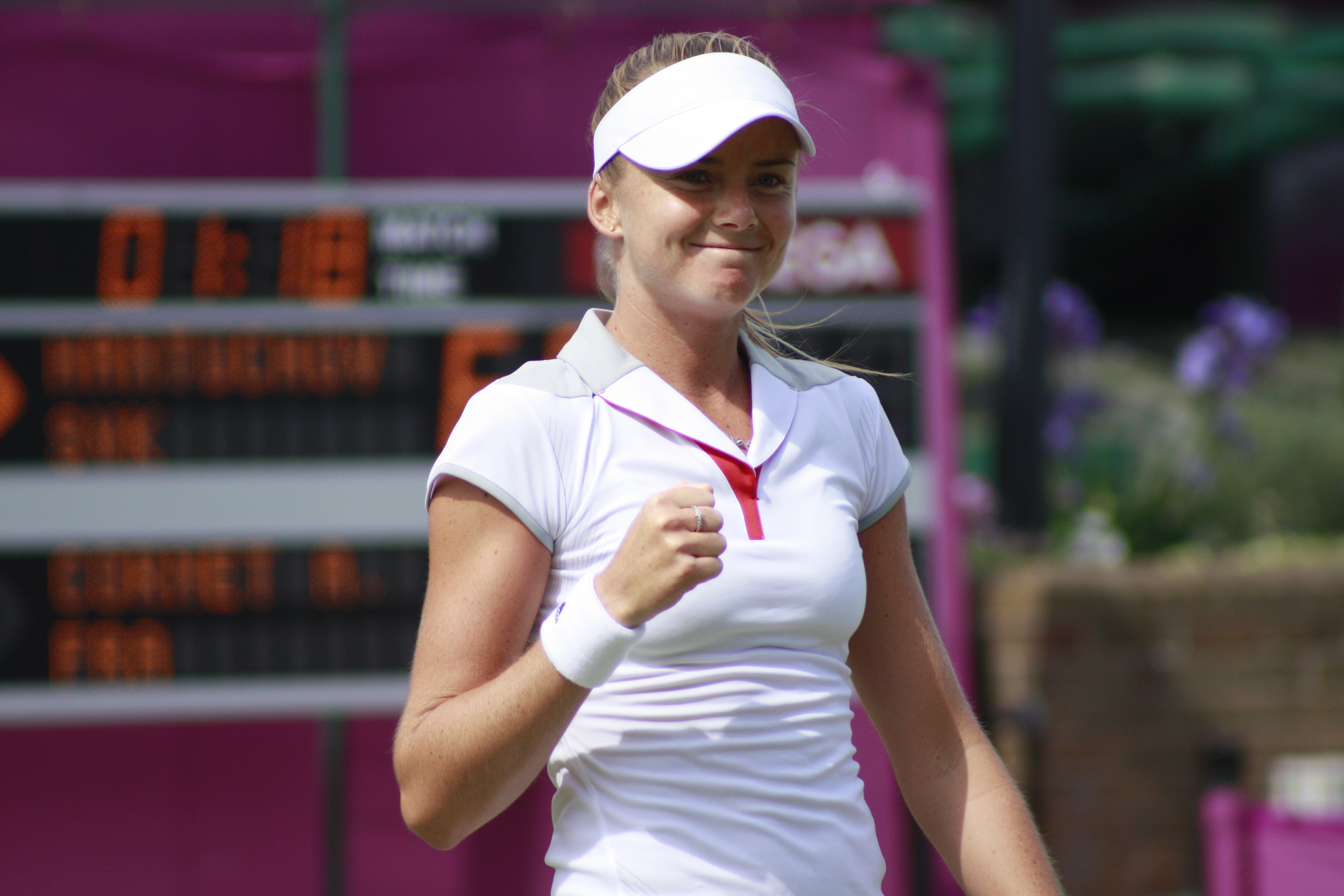
Daniela Hantuchová successfully defended her title in Pattaya

Daniela Hantuchová
Hantuchová went into a great start of the season by reaching the final of the Brisbane International, where she lost to Kaia Kanepi 2-6, 1-6. At the Australian Open, she reached the third round losing to Kim Clijsters 3-6, 2-6. She then defended her title at the PTT Pattaya Open defeating Maria Kirilenko 6-7^{(4-7)}, 6-3, 6-3 in the final She then withdrew from the entire clay season including the French Open due to a left foot injury. She then lost in the first rounds of Wimbledon 4-6, 6-7^{(1-7)} to Jamie Hampton and the US Open to Anastasia Pavlyuchenkova 4-6, 6-7^{(1-7)}. Her best win in the season was against then world no. 11 Li Na. Hantuchová was the last player to gain direct acceptance to Sofia after qualifier Venus Williams decided not to participate due to other commitments.

Tsvetana Pironkova
Pironkova is one of the wild card recipients, being a native of Bulgaria. Her best results are two quarterfinals. However, she was able to earn two top-ten wins over then world no. 9 Li Na at the Open GDF Suez, winning after Li retired 7-6^{(7–5)}, 3-2 and over then world no. 3 Agnieszka Radwańska at the Aegon International 6–2, 6–4. At the slams, she reached the fourth round of the US Open, losing to Ana Ivanovic 0-6, 4-6. She lost in the second round of the other slams, losing to Galina Voskoboeva 4-6, 4-6 at the Australian Open, to Francesca Schiavone 6-2, 3-6, 1-6 at the French Open and to Maria Sharapova at Wimbledon 6–7^{(3–7)}, 7–6^{(7–3)}, 0–6.

== Groupings ==
The 2012 edition of the Tournament of Champion, the competitors were divided into two groups the Sredets and Serdika, which are districts in Sofia. The Serdika Group consists of no. 1 seed Caroline Wozniacki, no. 4 seed Roberta Vinci, no. 5 seed Hsieh Su-wei, and no. 7 seed Daniela Hantuchová. The Sredets Groups are composed by no. 2 seed Nadia Petrova, no. 3 seed Maria Kirilenko, no. 6 seed Zheng Jie, and no. 8 seed Tsvetana Pironkova. The alternates are Sofia Arvidsson and Alizé Cornet.

In the Serdika group, in their respective head-to-heads, Caroline Wozniacki was 7-2, Roberta Vinci was 4-2, Hsieh Su-wei was 0-4, and Daniela Hantuchová was 4-7. Leading the group Wozniacki is down in her head-to-head against Vinci 0-1, losing their only encounter at the 2011 Rogers Cup 6-4, 7-5. Against Hsieh, the Danish has a perfect record of 2-0 winning their last encounter at the China Open 6-7^{(5-7)}, 7-6^{(7-3)}, 6-0. Wozniacki also has a good record against Hantuchová, as she led 5-1, with her beating the Slovak twice in the year, with the latest win coming at the 2012 Toray Pan Pacific Open 7-6^{(7-3)}, 6-1. Vinci on the other hand has a 1-0 record against Hsieh, with the win coming in the 2012 Dallas Tennis Classic 6-2, 6-2. Against Hantuchová, she is tied at 2-2, with Hantuchová winning their last encounter at the 2012 Brisbane International 7-5, 6-2. In the final head-to-head of the group between Hantuchová and Hsieh, the Slovak leads 1-0 with the win coming in the 2012 PTT Pattaya Open 6-4, 6-1.

In the Sredets group, in their head-to-heads with players within their group, Nadia Petrova was 12-6, Maria Kirilenko was 7-9, Zheng Jie was 8-11, and Tsvetana Pironkova is 1-2. Petrova's head-to-head in her group is mixed, she is 4-4 against compatriot Kirilenko, with Kirilenko winning their last match at the 2012 BNP Paribas Open 6-1, 5-7, 6-2. She then has a very good record against Zheng compiling an 8-1, with Petrova winning the first 5 meetings and their last meeting at the 2012 Summer Olympics 6-4, 7-6^{(9-7)}. She is however 0-1 against Pironkova, with the Bulgarian winning at the 2012 Brussels Open 6-3, 6-2. Kirilenko on the other hand is 3-5 down against Zheng in their head-to-head, however she won their last 2 meeting both in 2012, with the latest encounter at the 2012 Mutua Madrid Open 6-2, 7-5. Kirilenko and Pironkova will meet for the first time in the event. In the match-up between Zheng and Pironkova, Zheng lead 2-0 winning their most recent match at the 2012 New Haven Open at Yale 7-5, 6-2.

== Player head-to-head ==
Below are the head-to-head records as they approached the tournament.

		Wozniacki	Petrova	Kirilenko	Vinci	Hsieh	Zheng	Hantuchová	Pironkova	Overall	YTD
1	(Denmark) Caroline Wozniacki		4–1	5–1	0–1	2–0	1–3	5–1	3–0	20–7	46–20
2	(Russia) Nadia Petrova	1–4		4–4	2–2	1–0	8–1	4–3	0–1	23–15	34–19
3	(Russia) Maria Kirilenko	1–5	4–4		3–2	1–0	3–5	2–5	0–0	14–21	32–22
4	(Italy) Roberta Vinci	1–0	2–2	2–3		1–0	1–3	2–2	3–0	12–10	42–26
5	(Chinese Taipei) Hsieh Su-wei	0–2	0–1	0–1	0–1		1–0	0–1	0–0	1–6	46–18
6	(China) Zheng Jie	3–1	1–8	5–3	3–1	0–1		0–6	2–0	14–20	27–22
7	(Slovakia) Daniela Hantuchová	1–5	3–4	5–2	2–2	1–0	6–0		1–0	19–13	26–21
8	(Bulgaria) Tsvetana Pironkova	0–3	1–0	0–0	0–3	0–0	0–2	0–1		1–9	19–22

== Champions ==
=== Singles ===
- (Russia) Nadia Petrova def. (Denmark) Caroline Wozniacki, 6–2, 6–1

== See also ==
- WTA Tournament of Champions
- 2012 WTA Tour
