= 2019 İstanbul Cup – Doubles =

Doubles
- 2019 İstanbul Cup

Final
- Champions: (Hungary) Tímea Babos (France) Kristina Mladenovic
- Runners-up: (Chile) Alexa Guarachi (United States) Sabrina Santamaria
- Score: 6–1, 6–0

Details
- Draw: 16
- Seeds: 4

Events
Singles	Doubles
← 2018 ·	İstanbul Cup	· 2020 →

Liang Chen and Zhang Shuai were the defending champions, but chose not to participate this year.

Tímea Babos and Kristina Mladenovic won the title, defeating Alexa Guarachi and Sabrina Santamaria in the final, 6–1, 6–0.

== Seeds ==
1. (Hungary) Tímea Babos / (France) Kristina Mladenovic (champions)
2. (Belgium) Kirsten Flipkens / (Sweden) Johanna Larsson (first round)
3. (Romania) Irina Bara / (Romania) Mihaela Buzărnescu (first round)
4. (Russia) Veronika Kudermetova / (Kazakhstan) Galina Voskoboeva (first round)

== Draw ==
Key

- Q = Qualifier
- WC = Wild card
- LL = Lucky loser
- Alt = Alternate
- ITF = ITF entry
- PR = Protected ranking
- SR = Special ranking
- SE = Special exempt
- JE = Junior exempt
- JR = Junior Accelerator Programme entrant
- CO = College Accelerator Programme entrant
- NG = Next Gen Accelerator Program entrant
- w/o = Walkover
- r = Retired
- d = Defaulted

=== Draw ===
First round
1	(Hungary) T Babos (France) K Mladenovic	6	6
WC	(Turkey) Ç Büyükakçay (Turkey) P Özgen	2	4
(Romania) A Mitu (Russia) A Panova	6	6
(India) P Thombare (Netherlands) E Wacanno	2	2
3	(Romania) I Bara (Romania) M Buzărnescu	6	4	[7]
(Sweden) C Lister (Czech Republic) R Voráčová	3	6	[10]
(Kazakhstan) A Danilina (Russia) Y Sizikova	5	6	[8]
(Russia) M Gasparyan (Greece) M Sakkari	7	3	[10]
WC	(Turkey) M Sezer (Turkey) İ Soylu	6^{5}	6	[9]
(Australia) M Adamczak (Australia) J Moore	7^{7}	2	[11]
(Czech Republic) B Strýcová (Czech Republic) M Vondroušová	6	6
4	(Russia) V Kudermetova (Kazakhstan) G Voskoboeva	3	1
(United States) D Krawczyk (Mexico) G Olmos	5	7^{7}	[10]
(Chile) A Guarachi (United States) S Santamaria	7	6^{2}	[12]
(Switzerland) X Knoll (Hungary) F Stollár	6	7
2	(Belgium) K Flipkens (Sweden) J Larsson	2	5

Quarterfinals
1	(Hungary) T Babos (France) K Mladenovic	6^{6}	6	[10]
(Romania) A Mitu (Russia) A Panova	7^{8}	3	[6]
(Sweden) C Lister (Czech Republic) R Voráčová	6	6
(Russia) M Gasparyan (Greece) M Sakkari	1	4
(Australia) M Adamczak (Australia) J Moore	w/o
(Czech Republic) B Strýcová (Czech Republic) M Vondroušová
(Chile) A Guarachi (United States) S Santamaria	4	6	[10]
(Switzerland) X Knoll (Hungary) F Stollár	6	4	[4]

Semifinals
1	(Hungary) T Babos (France) K Mladenovic	6	6
(Sweden) C Lister (Czech Republic) R Voráčová	2	2
(Australia) M Adamczak (Australia) J Moore	3	4
(Chile) A Guarachi (United States) S Santamaria	6	6

Final
1	(Hungary) T Babos (France) K Mladenovic	6	6
(Chile) A Guarachi (United States) S Santamaria	1	0
