= 2012 Malaysian Open – Doubles =

Doubles
- 2012 Malaysian Open

Final
- Champions: (Chinese Taipei) Chang Kai-chen (Chinese Taipei) Chuang Chia-jung
- Runners-up: (Chinese Taipei) Chan Hao-ching (Japan) Rika Fujiwara
- Score: 7–5, 6–4

Details
- Draw: 16
- Seeds: 4

Events
Singles	Doubles
- Malaysian Open

Dinara Safina and Galina Voskoboeva were the defending champions, but both players chose not to participate.
Chang Kai-chen and Chuang Chia-jung won the title after defeating Chan Hao-ching and Rika Fujiwara 7–5, 6–4 in the final.

== Seeds ==
1. (Australia) Casey Dellacqua / (Australia) Jarmila Gajdošová (semifinals)
2. (Croatia) Petra Martić / (France) Kristina Mladenovic (first round)
3. (Chinese Taipei) Chan Hao-ching / (Japan) Rika Fujiwara (final)
4. (Japan) Shuko Aoyama / (Chinese Taipei) Chan Chin-wei (first round)

== Draw ==
Key

- Q = Qualifier
- WC = Wild card
- LL = Lucky loser
- Alt = Alternate
- ITF = ITF entry
- PR = Protected ranking
- SR = Special ranking
- SE = Special exempt
- JE = Junior exempt
- JR = Junior Accelerator Programme entrant
- CO = College Accelerator Programme entrant
- NG = Next Gen Accelerator Program entrant
- w/o = Walkover
- r = Retired
- d = Defaulted

=== Draw ===
First round
1	(Australia) C Dellacqua (Australia) J Gajdošová	6	3	[11]
(France) I Brémond (China) S Zheng	1	6	[9]
(Japan) E Sema (Germany) K Wörle	3	6	[6]
(Russia) E Bovina (United Kingdom) A Keothavong	6	1	[10]
4	(Japan) S Aoyama (Chinese Taipei) C-w Chan	6	2	[8]
(Chinese Taipei) K-c Chang (Chinese Taipei) C-j Chuang	3	6	[10]
(Australia) D Jeflea (Australia) O Rogowska	6	5	[5]
(Japan) Y Sema (Thailand) V Wongteanchai	3	7	[10]
WC	(Bulgaria) E Kostova (Luxembourg) A Kremer	1	2
(Romania) E Bogdan (Thailand) N Lertcheewakarn	6	6
WC	(Chinese Taipei) S-y Hsieh (Chinese Taipei) S-w Hsieh	4	6	[8]
3	(Chinese Taipei) H-c Chan (Japan) R Fujiwara	6	2	[10]
(Chinese Taipei) W-h Hsu (China) J Lu	1	3
(China) W Liu (China) Y Xu	6	6
(Czech Republic) Ka Plíšková (Czech Republic) Kr Plíšková	6	6
2	(Croatia) P Martić (France) K Mladenovic	4	3

Quarterfinals
1	(Australia) C Dellacqua (Australia) J Gajdošová	6	6
(Russia) E Bovina (United Kingdom) A Keothavong	2	4
(Chinese Taipei) K-c Chang (Chinese Taipei) C-j Chuang	6	6
(Japan) Y Sema (Thailand) V Wongteanchai	2	4
(Romania) E Bogdan (Thailand) N Lertcheewakarn	4	1
3	(Chinese Taipei) H-c Chan (Japan) R Fujiwara	6	6
(China) W Liu (China) Y Xu	5	3
(Czech Republic) Ka Plíšková (Czech Republic) Kr Plíšková	7	6

Semifinals
1	(Australia) C Dellacqua (Australia) J Gajdošová	4	0
(Chinese Taipei) K-c Chang (Chinese Taipei) C-j Chuang	6	6
3	(Chinese Taipei) H-c Chan (Japan) R Fujiwara	5	6	[11]
(Czech Republic) Ka Plíšková (Czech Republic) Kr Plíšková	7	2	[9]

Final
(Chinese Taipei) K-c Chang (Chinese Taipei) C-j Chuang	7	6
3	(Chinese Taipei) H-c Chan (Japan) R Fujiwara	5	4
