= 2019 İstanbul Cup =

- Date: 22–28 April
- Edition: 12th
- Category: WTA International
- Draw: 32S / 16D
- Prize money: $250,000
- Surface: Clay
- Location: Istanbul, Turkey

Champions

Singles
- (Croatia) Petra Martić

Doubles
- (Hungary) Tímea Babos / (France) Kristina Mladenovic
| ← 2018 · | İstanbul Cup | · 2020 → |

The 2019 İstanbul Cup (also known as the TEB BNP Paribas İstanbul Cup for sponsorship reasons) was a tennis tournament played on outdoor clay courts. It was the 12th edition of the İstanbul Cup, and part of the WTA International tournaments of the 2019 WTA Tour. It took place in Istanbul, Turkey, from 22 through 28 April 2019.

== Finals ==
=== Singles ===
(Croatia) Petra Martić defeated (Czech Republic) Markéta Vondroušová, 1–6, 6–4, 6–1

- It was Martić's only singles title of the year and the 1st of her career.

=== Doubles ===
(Hungary) Tímea Babos / (France) Kristina Mladenovic defeated (Chile) Alexa Guarachi / (United States) Sabrina Santamaria, 6–1, 6–0

== Points and prize money ==
| Event | W | F | SF | QF | Round of 16 | Round of 32 | Q | Q2 | Q1 |
| Singles | 280 | 180 | 110 | 60 | 30 | 1 | 18 | 12 | 1 |
| Doubles | 280 | 180 | 110 | 60 | 1 | — | — | — | — |

=== Prize money ===
| Event | W | F | SF | QF | Round of 16 | Round of 32 | Q2 | Q1 |
| Singles | $43,000 | $21,400 | $11,500 | $6,175 | $3,400 | $2,100 | $1,020 | $600 |
| Doubles | $12,300 | $6,400 | $3,435 | $1,820 | $960 | — | — | — |

== Singles main-draw entrants ==
=== Seeds ===
| Country | Player | Rank^{1} | Seed |
|---|---|---|---|
| ESP | Carla Suárez Navarro | 27 | 1 |
| ROU | Mihaela Buzărnescu | 30 | 2 |
| ~~ITA~~ | ~~Camila Giorgi~~ | ~~31~~ | ~~3~~ |
| UKR | Dayana Yastremska | 37 | 4 |
| AUS | Ajla Tomljanović | 39 | 5 |
| CRO | Petra Martić | 40 | 6 |
| CZE | Kateřina Siniaková | 41 | 7 |
| GRE | Maria Sakkari | 44 | 8 |
| SVK | Viktória Kužmová | 45 | 9 |

- Rankings are as of April 15, 2019.

=== Other entrants ===
The following players received wildcards into the singles main draw:

- (Turkey) Çağla Büyükakçay
- (Russia) Svetlana Kuznetsova
- (Turkey) Pemra Özgen

The following players received entry from the qualifying draw:

- (Romania) Irina Bara
- (Romania) Ana Bogdan
- (Serbia) Ivana Jorović
- (Ukraine) Kateryna Kozlova
- (Russia) Veronika Kudermetova
- (Kazakhstan) Elena Rybakina

The following players received entry as lucky losers:

- (Hungary) Tímea Babos
- (Israel) Julia Glushko

=== Withdrawals ===
Before the tournament

- (Romania) Irina-Camelia Begu → replaced by (Hungary) Tímea Babos
- (Italy) Camila Giorgi → replaced by (Israel) Julia Glushko
- (Tunisia) Ons Jabeur → replaced by (Russia) Margarita Gasparyan
- (Germany) Tatjana Maria → replaced by (Spain) Lara Arruabarrena
- (Slovakia) Anna Karolína Schmiedlová → replaced by (Sweden) Johanna Larsson

=== Retirements ===
- (Belgium) Kirsten Flipkens (lower right pelvis injury)
- (Russia) Margarita Gasparyan (dizziness)
- (Russia) Anastasia Potapova (gastrointestinal)

== Doubles main-draw entrants ==
=== Seeds ===
| Country | Player | Country | Player | Rank^{1} | Seed |
|---|---|---|---|---|---|
| HUN | Tímea Babos | FRA | Kristina Mladenovic | 6 | 1 |
| BEL | Kirsten Flipkens | SWE | Johanna Larsson | 74 | 2 |
| ROU | Irina Bara | ROU | Mihaela Buzărnescu | 94 | 3 |
| RUS | Veronika Kudermetova | KAZ | Galina Voskoboeva | 100 | 4 |

- ^{1} Rankings as of April 15, 2019.

=== Other entrants ===
The following pairs received wildcards into the doubles main draw:

- (Turkey) Çağla Büyükakçay / (Turkey) Pemra Özgen
- (Turkey) Melis Sezer / (Turkey) İpek Soylu

=== Withdrawals ===
During the tournament

- (Czech Republic) Barbora Strýcová (back injury)
