= 2020 İstanbul Cup =

- Date: 8–13 September
- Edition: 13th
- Category: WTA International
- Draw: 32S / 16D
- Prize money: $225,500
- Surface: Clay
- Location: Istanbul, Turkey
- Venue: Istanbul Tennis Center

Champions

Singles
- (Romania) Patricia Maria Țig

Doubles
- (Chile) Alexa Guarachi / (United States) Desirae Krawczyk
| ← 2019 · | İstanbul Cup | · 2021 → |

The 2020 İstanbul Cup (also known as the TEB BNP Paribas Tennis Championship İstanbul for sponsorship reasons) was a women's tennis tournament played on outdoor clay courts. It was the 13th edition of the İstanbul Cup, and part of the WTA International tournaments category of the 2020 WTA Tour. It took place in Istanbul, Turkey, from 8 September through 13 September 2020. Unseeded Patricia Maria Țig won the singles title.

== Finals ==
=== Singles ===
(Romania) Patricia Maria Țig defeated (Canada) Eugenie Bouchard 2–6, 6–1, 7–6^{(7–4)}

- It was Țig's only singles title of the year and the 1st of her career.

=== Doubles ===
- (Chile) Alexa Guarachi / (United States) Desirae Krawczyk defeated (Australia) Ellen Perez / (Australia) Storm Sanders, 6–1, 6–3

== Points and prize money ==
| Event | W | F | SF | QF | Round of 16 | Round of 32 | Q | Q2 | Q1 |
| Singles | 280 | 180 | 110 | 60 | 30 | 1 | 18 | 12 | 1 |
| Doubles | 280 | 180 | 110 | 60 | 1 | — | — | — | — |

=== Prize money ===
| Event | W | F | SF | QF | Round of 16 | Round of 32 | Q2 | Q1 |
| Singles | $25,000 | $14,000 | $8,401 | $5,006 | $3,430 | $2,600 | $2,251 | $1,630 |
| Doubles | $9,000 | $5,000 | $3,230 | $1,980 | $1,520 | — | — | — |

== Singles main-draw entrants ==
=== Seeds ===
| Country | Player | Rank^{1} | Seed |
|---|---|---|---|
| RUS | Svetlana Kuznetsova | 34 | 1 |
| SWE | Rebecca Peterson | 48 | 2 |
| SLO | Polona Hercog | 49 | 3 |
| FRA | Caroline Garcia | 50 | 4 |
| GBR | Heather Watson | 54 | 5 |
| BEL | Alison Van Uytvanck | 60 | 6 |
| KAZ | Zarina Diyas | 69 | 7 |
| JPN | Misaki Doi | 81 | 8 |

- Rankings are as of August 31, 2020.

=== Other entrants ===
The following players received wildcards into the singles main draw:

- (Turkey) Çağla Büyükakçay
- (Turkey) Berfu Cengiz
- (Turkey) Pemra Özgen

The following players received entry using a protected ranking into the singles main draw:

- (Ukraine) Kateryna Bondarenko
- (Slovakia) Anna Karolína Schmiedlová

The following players received entry from the qualifying draw:

- (Canada) Eugenie Bouchard
- (Serbia) Olga Danilović
- (Czech Republic) Tereza Martincová
- (Australia) Ellen Perez

=== Withdrawals ===
Before the tournament

- (Czech Republic) Marie Bouzková → replaced by (Ukraine) Kateryna Bondarenko
- (Romania) Sorana Cîrstea → replaced by (Belgium) Greet Minnen
- (Chinese Taipei) Hsieh Su-wei → replaced by (Romania) Patricia Maria Țig
- (Russia) Veronika Kudermetova → replaced by (Russia) Margarita Gasparyan
- (Poland) Magda Linette → replaced by (Belarus) Aliaksandra Sasnovich
- (Belgium) Elise Mertens → replaced by (Ukraine) Katarina Zavatska
- (France) Kristina Mladenovic → replaced by (Italy) Jasmine Paolini
- (Latvia) Jeļena Ostapenko → replaced by (Slovakia) Viktória Kužmová
- (Kazakhstan) Yulia Putintseva → replaced by (Switzerland) Stefanie Vögele
- (Latvia) Anastasija Sevastova → replaced by (Slovenia) Kaja Juvan
- (Germany) Laura Siegemund → replaced by (Bulgaria) Viktoriya Tomova
- (Australia) Ajla Tomljanović → replaced by (Montenegro) Danka Kovinić
- (Slovenia) Tamara Zidanšek → replaced by (Slovakia) Anna Karolína Schmiedlová

== Doubles main-draw entrants ==
=== Seeds ===
| Country | Player | Country | Player | Rank^{1} | Seed |
|---|---|---|---|---|---|
| CHI | Alexa Guarachi | USA | Desirae Krawczyk | 76 | 1 |
| AUS | Ellen Perez | AUS | Storm Sanders | 104 | 2 |
| USA | Kaitlyn Christian | MEX | Giuliana Olmos | 128 | 3 |
| UKR | Kateryna Bondarenko | CAN | Sharon Fichman | 182 | 4 |

- ^{1} Rankings as of August 31, 2020.

=== Other entrants ===
The following pairs received wildcards into the doubles main draw:

- (Turkey) Ayla Aksu / (Turkey) İpek Öz
- (Canada) Eugenie Bouchard / (Turkey) Başak Eraydın

The following pair received entry as alternates:

- (Slovakia) Anna Karolína Schmiedlová / (Ukraine) Katarina Zavatska

=== Withdrawals ===
Before the tournament

- (United Kingdom) Heather Watson
