= 2012 Qatar Airways Tournament of Champions – Singles =

Singles
- 2012 Qatar Airways Tournament of Champions

Final
- Champion: (Russia) Nadia Petrova
- Runner-up: (Denmark) Caroline Wozniacki
- Score: 6–2, 6–1

Details
- Draw: 8

Events
Singles
- WTA Tournament of Champions

Ana Ivanovic was the two-time defending champion, but did not qualify and was not able to compete as a wildcard due to playing in the Fed Cup.

Second seed Nadia Petrova won the title, defeating top seed Caroline Wozniacki in the final. This was Petrova's 13th and final WTA singles title before announcing her retirement in January 2017 (she played her last tournament in April 2014).

== Players ==
1. (Denmark) Caroline Wozniacki (final)
2. (Russia) Nadia Petrova (champion)
3. (Russia) Maria Kirilenko (round robin, withdrew)
4. (Italy) Roberta Vinci (semifinals)
5. (Chinese Taipei) Hsieh Su-wei (round robin)
6. (China) Zheng Jie (round robin, Retired)
7. (Slovakia) Daniela Hantuchová (round robin)
8. (Bulgaria) Tsvetana Pironkova (semifinals)

== Alternates ==
1. (Sweden) Sofia Arvidsson (round robin, Replaced Kirilenko)
2. (France) Alizé Cornet (Not Used)

== Draw ==
The eight players have been drawn into two groups – "Serdika" and "Sredets" – which are the ancient names of the city of Sofia during the thracian and medieval periods, respectively, of Bulgarian history. Key

- Q = Qualifier
- WC = Wild card
- LL = Lucky loser
- Alt = Alternate
- ITF = ITF entry
- PR = Protected ranking
- SR = Special ranking
- SE = Special exempt
- JE = Junior exempt
- JR = Junior Accelerator Programme entrant
- CO = College Accelerator Programme entrant
- NG = Next Gen Accelerator Program entrant
- w/o = Walkover
- r = Retired
- d = Defaulted

=== Finals ===
Semifinals
1	(Denmark) Caroline Wozniacki	6	6
8/WC	(Bulgaria) Tsvetana Pironkova	4	1
2	(Russia) Nadia Petrova	6^{6}	6	6
4	(Italy) Roberta Vinci	7^{8}	1	4

Final
1	(Denmark) Caroline Wozniacki	2	1
2	(Russia) Nadia Petrova	6	6

=== Serdika group ===
		(Denmark) Wozniacki	(Italy) Vinci	(Chinese Taipei) Hsieh	(Slovakia) Hantuchová	RR W–L	Set W–L	Game W–L	Standings
1	(Denmark) Caroline Wozniacki		6–3, 6–1	6–2, 6–2	3–6, 7–6^{(7–4)}, 6–4	3–0	6–1 (85.7%)	40–24 (62.5%)	1
4	(Italy) Roberta Vinci	3–6, 1–6		6–1, 6–2	6–1, 6–2	2–1	4–2 (66.7%)	28–18 (60.9%)	2
5	(Chinese Taipei) Hsieh Su-wei	2–6, 2–6	1–6, 2–6		6–1, 0–6, 6–4	1–2	2–5 (28.6%)	19–35 (35.2%)	3
7	(Slovakia) Daniela Hantuchová	6–3, 6–7^{(4–7)}, 4–6	1–6, 2–6	1–6, 6–0, 4–6		0–3	2–6 (25%)	30–40 (42.9%)	4

Standings are determined by: 1. number of wins; 2. number of matches; 3. in two-players-ties, head-to-head records; 4. in three-players-ties, percentage of sets won, or of games won; 5. steering-committee decision.

=== Sredets group ===
		(Russia) Petrova	(Russia) Kirilenko (Sweden) Arvidsson	(China) Zheng	(Bulgaria) Pironkova	RR W–L	Set W–L	Game W–L	Standings
2	(Russia) Nadia Petrova		3–6, 7–6^{(7–4)}, 6–3 (w/ Kirilenko)	6–3, 6–3	5–7, 6–1, 6–3	3–0	6–2 (75%)	45–32 (58.4%)	1
3/WC; Alt	(Russia) Maria Kirilenko (Sweden) Sofia Arvidsson	6–3, 6–7^{(4–7)}, 3–6 (w/ Kirilenko)		(w/ Arvidsson); 5–1^{r}	6–1, 6–4 (w/ Kirilenko)	1–1; 1–0	3–2 (60%); 0–0 (0%)	27–21 (56%); 5–1 (83.3%)	X 3
6	(China) Zheng Jie	3–6, 3–6	1^{r}–5 (w/ Arvidsson)		6–2, 4–6, 6–7^{(4–7)}	0–3	1–4 (20%)	23–32 (41.8%)	4
8/WC	(Bulgaria) Tsvetana Pironkova	7–5, 1–6, 3–6	1–6, 4–6 (w/ Kirilenko)	2–6, 6–4, 7–6^{(7–4)}		1–2	3–5 (37.5%)	31–45 (40.8%)	2

Standings are determined by: 1. number of wins; 2. number of matches; 3. in two-players-ties, head-to-head records; 4. in three-players-ties, percentage of sets won, or of games won; 5. steering-committee decision.
