= 2012 Malaysian Open – Singles =

Singles
- 2012 Malaysian Open

Final
- Champion: (Chinese Taipei) Hsieh Su-wei
- Runner-up: (Croatia) Petra Martić
- Score: 2–6, 7–5, 4–1^{r}

Details
- Draw: 32
- Seeds: 8

Events
Singles	Doubles
- Malaysian Open

Jelena Dokić was the defending champion, but lost in the second round to compatriot Olivia Rogowska.

Hsieh Su-wei took the title by defeating No.5 seed Petra Martić in the final 2–6, 7–5, 4–1. Martić retired due to fatigue and cramping after playing a three-hour semifinal match earlier in the day.

== Seeds ==
1. (Poland) Agnieszka Radwańska (quarterfinals, withdrew due to a right elbow injury)
2. (Serbia) Jelena Janković (semifinals)
3. (China) Peng Shuai (quarterfinals)
4. (Australia) Jarmila Gajdošová (second round)
5. (Croatia) Petra Martić (final, retired due to fatigue and cramping)
6. (Japan) Ayumi Morita (quarterfinals, withdrew due to a right shoulder injury)
7. (Australia) Jelena Dokić (second round)
8. (United Kingdom) Anne Keothavong (first round)

== Draw ==
Key

- Q = Qualifier
- WC = Wild card
- LL = Lucky loser
- Alt = Alternate
- ITF = ITF entry
- PR = Protected ranking
- SR = Special ranking
- SE = Special exempt
- JE = Junior exempt
- JR = Junior Accelerator Programme entrant
- CO = College Accelerator Programme entrant
- NG = Next Gen Accelerator Program entrant
- w/o = Walkover
- r = Retired
- d = Defaulted

=== Finals ===
Semifinals
Q	(Chinese Taipei) Hsieh Su-wei	6	4	6
(Greece) Eleni Daniilidou	0	6	1
5	(Croatia) Petra Martić	6^{5}	7	7^{7}
2/WC	(Serbia) Jelena Janković	7^{7}	5	6^{5}

Final
Q	(Chinese Taipei) Hsieh Su-wei	2	7	4
5	(Croatia) Petra Martić	6	5	1^{r}

=== Top half ===
First round
1/WC	(Poland) A Radwańska	6	6
(Uzbekistan) A Amanmuradova	2	4
Q	(Czech Republic) Ka Plíšková	6	6
(Chinese Taipei) K-c Chang	3	2
(Australia) C Dellacqua	6	6
(Serbia) B Jovanovski	0	2
Q	(Chinese Taipei) S-w Hsieh	6	7
8	(United Kingdom) A Keothavong	4	5
4/WC	(Australia) J Gajdošová	1	7^{7}	7
(Germany) K Wörle	6	6^{2}	5
(Greece) E Daniilidou	6	1	6
(India) S Mirza	2	6	4
(Australia) O Rogowska	6	6
(Bulgaria) E Kostova	4	0
(France) K Mladenovic	3	1
7	(Australia) J Dokić	6	6

Second round
1/WC	(Poland) A Radwańska	6	6
Q	(Czech Republic) Ka Plíšková	4	4
(Australia) C Dellacqua	1	5
Q	(Chinese Taipei) S-w Hsieh	6	7
4/WC	(Australia) J Gajdošová	4	0
(Greece) E Daniilidou	6	6
(Australia) O Rogowska	3	6	7^{7}
7	(Australia) J Dokić	6	4	6^{2}

Quarterfinals
1/WC	(Poland) A Radwańska
Q	(Chinese Taipei) S-w Hsieh	w/o
(Greece) E Daniilidou	6	3	6
(Australia) O Rogowska	2	6	2

Semifinals
Q	(Chinese Taipei) S-w Hsieh	6	4	6
(Greece) E Daniilidou	0	6	1

=== Bottom half ===
First round
5	(Croatia) P Martić	4	6	7
(Japan) E Sema	6	4	5
(Japan) K Nara	6	6
(Thailand) N Lertcheewakarn	4	3
Q	(Czech Republic) Kr Plíšková	6	6
(France) I Brémond	0	2
(Austria) Y Meusburger	1	6	2
3	(China) S Peng	6	4	6
6	(Japan) A Morita	6	6
Q	(Thailand) N Luangnam	4	0
WC	(Russia) O Puchkova	6	1	2
(Japan) M Doi	4	6	6
(United States) J Craybas	6	1	6
(Japan) Y Sema	4	6	4
(France) C Garcia	6^{7}	6	6^{2}
2/WC	(Serbia) J Janković	7^{9}	4	7^{7}

Second round
5	(Croatia) P Martić	6	3	6
(Japan) K Nara	2	6	0
Q	(Czech Republic) Kr Plíšková	6	1	4
3	(China) S Peng	2	6	6
6	(Japan) A Morita	7^{8}	6
(Japan) M Doi	6^{6}	2
(United States) J Craybas	2	0
2/WC	(Serbia) J Janković	6	6

Quarterfinals
5	(Croatia) P Martić	4	7^{7}	6
3	(China) S Peng	6	6^{3}	4
6	(Japan) A Morita
2/WC	(Serbia) J Janković	w/o

Semifinals
5	(Croatia) P Martić	6^{5}	7	7^{7}
2/WC	(Serbia) J Janković	7^{7}	5	6^{5}

== Qualifying ==
=== Seeds ===
The top seed received a bye into the second round (of the qualifying).

1. (Chinese Taipei) Hsieh Su-wei (qualified)
2. (Czech Republic) Karolína Plíšková (qualified)
3. (Czech Republic) Kristýna Plíšková (qualified)
4. (Japan) Rika Fujiwara (second round)
5. (Romania) Elena Bogdan (qualifying competition)
6. (Thailand) Varatchaya Wongteanchai (first round)
7. (Hong Kong) Zhang Ling (first round)
8. (Indonesia) Ayu Fani Damayanti (qualifying competition)

=== Qualifiers ===
1. (Chinese Taipei) Hsieh Su-wei
2. (Czech Republic) Karolína Plíšková
3. (Czech Republic) Kristýna Plíšková
4. (Thailand) Nudnida Luangnam

=== Draw ===
==== First qualifier ====
First round
(Australia) Daniella Jeflea	4	6	4
(China) Xu Yifan	6	3	6
(China) Zhao Yijing	2	4
(China) Zheng Saisai	6	6
(China) Zhou Yimiao	6^{4}	3
8	(Indonesia) Ayu Fani Damayanti	7^{7}	6

Second round
1	(Chinese Taipei) Hsieh Su-wei	7	6
(China) Xu Yifan	5	2
(China) Zheng Saisai	3	6	6^{6}
8	(Indonesia) Ayu Fani Damayanti	6	4	7^{8}

Qualifying competition
1	(Chinese Taipei) Hsieh Su-wei	7^{8}	6
8	(Indonesia) Ayu Fani Damayanti	6^{6}	0

==== Second qualifier ====
First round
2	(Czech Republic) Karolína Plíšková	6	6
(Japan) Junri Namigata	0	1
WC	(Malaysia) Choo Lyn Yuen	0	2
(Ukraine) Tetyana Arefyeva	6	6
(Finland) Piia Suomalainen	4	1
(Chinese Taipei) Chan Chin-wei	6	6
(Austria) Nicole Rottmann	4	1
5	(Romania) Elena Bogdan	6	6

Second round
2	(Czech Republic) Karolína Plíšková	7^{7}	6
(Ukraine) Tetyana Arefyeva	6^{3}	0
(Chinese Taipei) Chan Chin-wei	2	6	5
5	(Romania) Elena Bogdan	6	2	7

Qualifying competition
2	(Czech Republic) Karolína Plíšková	6	7
5	(Romania) Elena Bogdan	1	5

==== Third qualifier ====
First round
3	(Czech Republic) Kristýna Plíšková	3	6	6
(Slovenia) Tadeja Majerič	6	4	3
(Japan) Shuko Aoyama	6	4	6
WC	(Malaysia) Jawairiah Noordin	4	6	3
(Chinese Taipei) Hsu Wen-hsin	6^{2}	4
(China) Wang Qiang	7^{7}	6
(Thailand) Luksika Kumkhum	6	6
7	(Hong Kong) Zhang Ling	3	4

Second round
3	(Czech Republic) Kristýna Plíšková	6	7
(Japan) Shuko Aoyama	1	5
(China) Wang Qiang	1	2
(Thailand) Luksika Kumkhum	6	6

Qualifying competition
3	(Czech Republic) Kristýna Plíšková	6	6
(Thailand) Luksika Kumkhum	3	4

==== Fourth qualifier ====
First round
4	(Japan) Rika Fujiwara	6	7
(China) Lu Jingjing	3	5
(Thailand) Nudnida Luangnam	1	6	7
(Croatia) Donna Vekić	6	4	5
(Bosnia and Herzegovina) Jasmina Tinjić	3	3
(Luxembourg) Anne Kremer	6	6
(Russia) Elena Bovina	6	3	6
6	(Thailand) Varatchaya Wongteanchai	4	6	2

Second round
4	(Japan) Rika Fujiwara	3	2
(Thailand) Nudnida Luangnam	6	6
(Luxembourg) Anne Kremer	6	6^{4}	3
(Russia) Elena Bovina	3	7^{7}	6

Qualifying competition
(Thailand) Nudnida Luangnam	6	6
(Russia) Elena Bovina	2	4
