= 2020 İstanbul Cup – Doubles =

Doubles
- 2020 İstanbul Cup

Final
- Champions: (Chile) Alexa Guarachi (United States) Desirae Krawczyk
- Runners-up: (Australia) Ellen Perez (Australia) Storm Sanders
- Score: 6–1, 6–3

Details
- Draw: 16
- Seeds: 4

Events
Singles	Doubles
- İstanbul Cup

Tímea Babos and Kristina Mladenovic were the defending champions, but chose not to participate this year.

The first-seeded team of Alexa Guarachi and Desirae Krawczyk won the title, defeating Ellen Perez and Storm Sanders in the final, 6–1, 6–3.

== Seeds ==
1. (Chile) Alexa Guarachi / (United States) Desirae Krawczyk (champions)
2. (Australia) Ellen Perez / (Australia) Storm Sanders (final)
3. (United States) Kaitlyn Christian / (Mexico) Giuliana Olmos (semifinals)
4. (Ukraine) Kateryna Bondarenko / (Canada) Sharon Fichman (first round)

== Draw ==
Key

- Q = Qualifier
- WC = Wild card
- LL = Lucky loser
- Alt = Alternate
- ITF = ITF entry
- PR = Protected ranking
- SR = Special ranking
- SE = Special exempt
- JE = Junior exempt
- JR = Junior Accelerator Programme entrant
- CO = College Accelerator Programme entrant
- NG = Next Gen Accelerator Program entrant
- w/o = Walkover
- r = Retired
- d = Defaulted

=== Draw ===
First round
1	(Chile) A Guarachi (United States) D Krawczyk	4	6	[10]
(Belarus) L Marozava (Romania) A Mitu	6	1	[8]
(France) E Lechemia (United States) I Neel	6	6
(Germany) V Heisen (United Kingdom) E Webley-Smith	4	2
3	(United States) K Christian (Mexico) G Olmos	6	3	[10]
(Netherlands) B Schoofs (Netherlands) R van der Hoek	4	6	[7]
(Russia) N Dzalamidze (Japan) M Kato	3^{r}
(Belgium) G Minnen (Belgium) A Van Uytvanck	4
WC	(Turkey) A Aksu (Turkey) İ Öz	6	3	[3]
(Kazakhstan) A Danilina (Russia) Y Sizikova	4	6	[10]
Alt	(Slovakia) AK Schmiedlová (Ukraine) K Zavatska	6	7^{7}
4	(Ukraine) K Bondarenko (Canada) S Fichman	3	6^{4}
WC	(Canada) E Bouchard (Turkey) B Eraydın	4	3
(United Kingdom) N Broady (New Zealand) E Routliffe	6	6
(Romania) LI Paar (Germany) J Wachaczyk	5	1
2	(Australia) E Perez (Australia) S Sanders	7	6

Quarterfinals
1	(Chile) A Guarachi (United States) D Krawczyk	6	6
(France) E Lechemia (United States) I Neel	4	4
3	(United States) K Christian (Mexico) G Olmos	6	4	[10]
(Belgium) G Minnen (Belgium) A Van Uytvanck	3	6	[8]
(Kazakhstan) A Danilina (Russia) Y Sizikova	2	2
Alt	(Slovakia) AK Schmiedlová (Ukraine) K Zavatska	6	6
(United Kingdom) N Broady (New Zealand) E Routliffe	2	2
2	(Australia) E Perez (Australia) S Sanders	6	6

Semifinals
1	(Chile) A Guarachi (United States) D Krawczyk	6	7
3	(United States) K Christian (Mexico) G Olmos	3	5
Alt	(Slovakia) AK Schmiedlová (Ukraine) K Zavatska	5	3
2	(Australia) E Perez (Australia) S Sanders	7	6

Final
1	(Chile) A Guarachi (United States) D Krawczyk	6	6
2	(Australia) E Perez (Australia) S Sanders	1	3
