= 2012 Malaysian Open =

- Date: 27 February – 4 March
- Edition: 3rd
- Category: International tournament
- Draw: 32S / 16D
- Prize money: $220,000
- Surface: Hard / outdoor
- Location: Kuala Lumpur, Malaysia

Champions

Singles
- (Chinese Taipei) Hsieh Su-wei

Doubles
- (Chinese Taipei) Chang Kai-chen / (Chinese Taipei) Chuang Chia-jung
- Malaysian Open

The 2012 BMW Malaysian Open was a women's tennis tournament played on outdoor hard courts. It was the third edition of the Malaysian Open and was an International tournament on the 2012 WTA Tour. The tournament took place from 27 February to 4 March at the Bukit Kiara Equestrian and Country Resort. Unseeded Hsieh Su-wei, who entered the main draw as a qualifier, won the singles title.

== Finals ==
=== Singles ===
(Chinese Taipei) Hsieh Su-wei defeated (Croatia) Petra Martić 2–6, 7–5, 4–1 ret.

- It was Hsieh's 1st singles title of her career.

=== Doubles ===
(Chinese Taipei) Chang Kai-chen / (Chinese Taipei) Chuang Chia-jung defeated (Chinese Taipei) Chan Hao-ching / (Japan) Rika Fujiwara 7–5, 6–4

== Singles main draw entrants ==
=== Seeds ===
Country	Player	Ranking^{1}	Seeds
POL	Agnieszka Radwańska	6	1
SRB	Jelena Janković	14	2
CHN	Peng Shuai	17	3
AUS	Jarmila Gajdošová	43	4
CRO	Petra Martić	66	5
JPN	Ayumi Morita	69	6
AUS	Jelena Dokić	74	7
GBR	Anne Keothavong	77	8

- ^{1} Rankings are as of February 20, 2012

=== Other entrants ===
The following players received wildcards into the main draw:

- (Australia) Jarmila Gajdošová
- (Serbia) Jelena Janković
- (Russia) Olga Puchkova
- (Poland) Agnieszka Radwańska

The following players received entry from the qualifying draw:

- (Chinese Taipei) Hsieh Su-wei
- (Thailand) Nudnida Luangnam
- (Czech Republic) Karolína Plíšková
- (Czech Republic) Kristýna Plíšková

=== Retirements ===
- (Croatia) Petra Martić (fatigue and cramping)
- (Japan) Ayumi Morita (right shoulder injury)
- (Poland) Agnieszka Radwańska (right elbow injury)

== Doubles main draw entrants ==
=== Seeds ===
Country	Player	Country	Player	Rank^{1}	Seed
AUS	Casey Dellacqua	AUS	Jarmila Gajdošová	98	1
CRO	Petra Martić	FRA	Kristina Mladenovic	130	2
TPE	Chan Hao-ching	JPN	Rika Fujiwara	158	3
JPN	Shuko Aoyama	TPE	Chan Chin-wei	202	4

- ^{1} Rankings are as of February 20, 2012

=== Other entrants ===
The following pairs received wildcards into the doubles main draw:

- (Bulgaria) Elitsa Kostova / (Luxembourg) Anne Kremer
- (Chinese Taipei) Hsieh Shu-ying / (Chinese Taipei) Hsieh Su-wei
