= 2019 İstanbul Cup – Singles =

Singles
- 2019 İstanbul Cup

Final
- Champion: (Croatia) Petra Martić
- Runner-up: (Czech Republic) Markéta Vondroušová
- Score: 1–6, 6–4, 6–1

Details
- Draw: 32
- Seeds: 8

Events
Singles	Doubles
- İstanbul Cup

Pauline Parmentier was the defending champion, but lost in the second round to Elena Rybakina.

Petra Martić won her first WTA Tour title, defeating Markéta Vondroušová in the final, 1–6, 6–4, 6–1.

== Seeds ==
1. (Spain) Carla Suárez Navarro (first round)
2. (Romania) Mihaela Buzărnescu (second round)
3. (Italy) Camila Giorgi (withdrew)
4. (Ukraine) Dayana Yastremska (first round)
5. (Australia) Ajla Tomljanović (first round)
6. (Croatia) Petra Martić (champion)
7. (Czech Republic) Kateřina Siniaková (first round)
8. (Greece) Maria Sakkari (first round)
9. (Slovakia) Viktória Kužmová (first round)

== Draw ==
Key

- Q = Qualifier
- WC = Wild card
- LL = Lucky loser
- Alt = Alternate
- ITF = ITF entry
- PR = Protected ranking
- SR = Special ranking
- SE = Special exempt
- JE = Junior exempt
- JR = Junior Accelerator Programme entrant
- CO = College Accelerator Programme entrant
- NG = Next Gen Accelerator Program entrant
- w/o = Walkover
- r = Retired
- d = Defaulted

=== Finals ===
Semifinals
(Czech Republic) Markéta Vondroušová	6	6
(Czech Republic) Barbora Strýcová	2	1
6	(Croatia) Petra Martić	6	0
(Russia) Margarita Gasparyan	1	0^{r}

Final
(Czech Republic) Markéta Vondroušová	6	4	1
6	(Croatia) Petra Martić	1	6	6

=== Top half ===
First round
1	(Spain) C Suárez Navarro	4	5
(Spain) L Arruabarrena	6	7
(Sweden) R Peterson	6	2	6
WC	(Turkey) P Özgen	1	6	0
WC	(Turkey) Ç Büyükakçay	3	6^{4}
WC	(Russia) S Kuznetsova	6	7^{7}
(Czech Republic) M Vondroušová	6	6
5	(Australia) A Tomljanović	3	3
9	(Slovakia) V Kužmová	7	5	4
(Czech Republic) B Strýcová	5	7	6
(Romania) S Cîrstea	2	6	6
Q	(Romania) I Bara	6	0	0
(France) P Parmentier	6	6
(Russia) E Rodina	1	1
Q	(Kazakhstan) E Rybakina	3	6	6
7	(Czech Republic) K Siniaková	6	2	4

Second round
(Spain) L Arruabarrena	6	6
(Sweden) R Peterson	3	2
WC	(Russia) S Kuznetsova	4	3
(Czech Republic) M Vondroušová	6	6
(Czech Republic) B Strýcová	6	1	6
(Romania) S Cîrstea	2	6	3
(France) P Parmentier	0	4
Q	(Kazakhstan) E Rybakina	6	6

Quarterfinals
(Spain) L Arruabarrena	1	2
(Czech Republic) M Vondroušová	6	6
(Czech Republic) B Strýcová	0	7^{8}	6
Q	(Kazakhstan) E Rybakina	6	6^{6}	0

Semifinals
(Czech Republic) M Vondroušová	6	6
(Czech Republic) B Strýcová	2	1

=== Bottom half ===
First round
6	(Croatia) P Martić	3	6	6
(Slovenia) T Zidanšek	6	1	3
(Belgium) K Flipkens	1	0^{r}
Q	(Romania) A Bogdan	6	1
Q	(Ukraine) K Kozlova	6	1
(Russia) A Potapova	3	0^{r}
(France) K Mladenovic	6	6
4	(Ukraine) D Yastremska	3	4
8	(Greece) M Sakkari	3	4
Q	(Russia) V Kudermetova	6	6
LL	(Hungary) T Babos	6	6
Q	(Serbia) I Jorović	4	4
(Sweden) J Larsson	6^{6}	6	3
(Russia) M Gasparyan	7^{8}	4	6
LL	(Israel) J Glushko	4	4
2	(Romania) M Buzărnescu	6	6

Second round
6	(Croatia) P Martić	4	7	6
Q	(Romania) A Bogdan	6	5	3
Q	(Ukraine) K Kozlova	1	2
(France) K Mladenovic	6	6
Q	(Russia) V Kudermetova	6	7^{7}
LL	(Hungary) T Babos	0	6^{4}
(Russia) M Gasparyan	1	6	7
2	(Romania) M Buzărnescu	6	4	5

Quarterfinals
6	(Croatia) P Martić	7^{7}	4	7^{7}
(France) K Mladenovic	6^{4}	6	6^{2}
Q	(Russia) V Kudermetova	5	4
(Russia) M Gasparyan	7	6

Semifinals
6	(Croatia) P Martić	6	0
(Russia) M Gasparyan	1	0^{r}

== Qualifying ==
=== Seeds ===
1. (Russia) Veronika Kudermetova (qualified)
2. (Ukraine) Kateryna Kozlova (qualified)
3. (Serbia) Ivana Jorović (qualified)
4. (Israel) Julia Glushko (qualifying competition, lucky loser)
5. (Hungary) Tímea Babos (qualifying competition, retired, lucky loser)
6. (Hungary) Fanny Stollár (first round)
7. (Romania) Ana Bogdan (qualified)
8. (Bulgaria) Viktoriya Tomova (first round)
9. (Montenegro) Danka Kovinić (first round, retired)
10. (Kazakhstan) Elena Rybakina (qualified)
11. (Romania) Alexandra Dulgheru (qualifying competition)
12. (Australia) Arina Rodionova (first round)

=== Qualifiers ===
1. (Russia) Veronika Kudermetova
2. (Ukraine) Kateryna Kozlova
3. (Serbia) Ivana Jorović
4. (Romania) Irina Bara
5. (Kazakhstan) Elena Rybakina
6. (Romania) Ana Bogdan

=== Lucky losers ===
1. (Israel) Julia Glushko
2. (Hungary) Tímea Babos

=== Draw ===
==== First qualifier ====
First round
1	(Russia) Veronika Kudermetova	7^{9}	6
(Mexico) Giuliana Olmos	6^{7}	1
(Italy) Martina Di Giuseppe	6	6
8	(Bulgaria) Viktoriya Tomova	3	2

Qualifying competition
1	(Russia) Veronika Kudermetova	6	6
(Italy) Martina Di Giuseppe	4	1

==== Second qualifier ====
First round
2	(Ukraine) Kateryna Kozlova	6	6
WC	(Turkey) Berfu Cengiz	0	2
(Croatia) Tereza Mrdeža	6	2	3
11	(Romania) Alexandra Dulgheru	3	6	6

Qualifying competition
2	(Ukraine) Kateryna Kozlova	6	6
11	(Romania) Alexandra Dulgheru	2	4

==== Third qualifier ====
First round
3	(Serbia) Ivana Jorović	6	3	6
WC	(Turkey) İpek Soylu	1	6	2
(Russia) Yana Sizikova	6	1
9	(Montenegro) Danka Kovinić	3	2^{r}

Qualifying competition
3	(Serbia) Ivana Jorović	6	6
(Russia) Yana Sizikova	1	2

==== Fourth qualifier ====
First round
4	(Israel) Julia Glushko	6	6
WC	(Turkey) Zeynep Sönmez	3	2
(Romania) Irina Bara	6	6
12	(Australia) Arina Rodionova	1	1

Qualifying competition
4	(Israel) Julia Glushko	6	4	2
(Romania) Irina Bara	2	6	6

==== Fifth qualifier ====
First round
5	(Hungary) Tímea Babos	7	6^{4}	6
(Austria) Barbara Haas	5	7^{7}	1
(Russia) Valentina Ivakhnenko	1	0^{r}
10	(Kazakhstan) Elena Rybakina	6	1

Qualifying competition
5	(Hungary) Tímea Babos	4	0^{r}
10	(Kazakhstan) Elena Rybakina	6	3

==== Sixth qualifier ====
First round
6	(Hungary) Fanny Stollár	3	1
WC	(Turkey) İpek Öz	6	6
(Hungary) Anna Bondár	6	3	3
7	(Romania) Ana Bogdan	2	6	6

Qualifying competition
WC	(Turkey) İpek Öz	0	2
7	(Romania) Ana Bogdan	6	6
