= Petra Martić =

Croatian tennis player (born 1991)

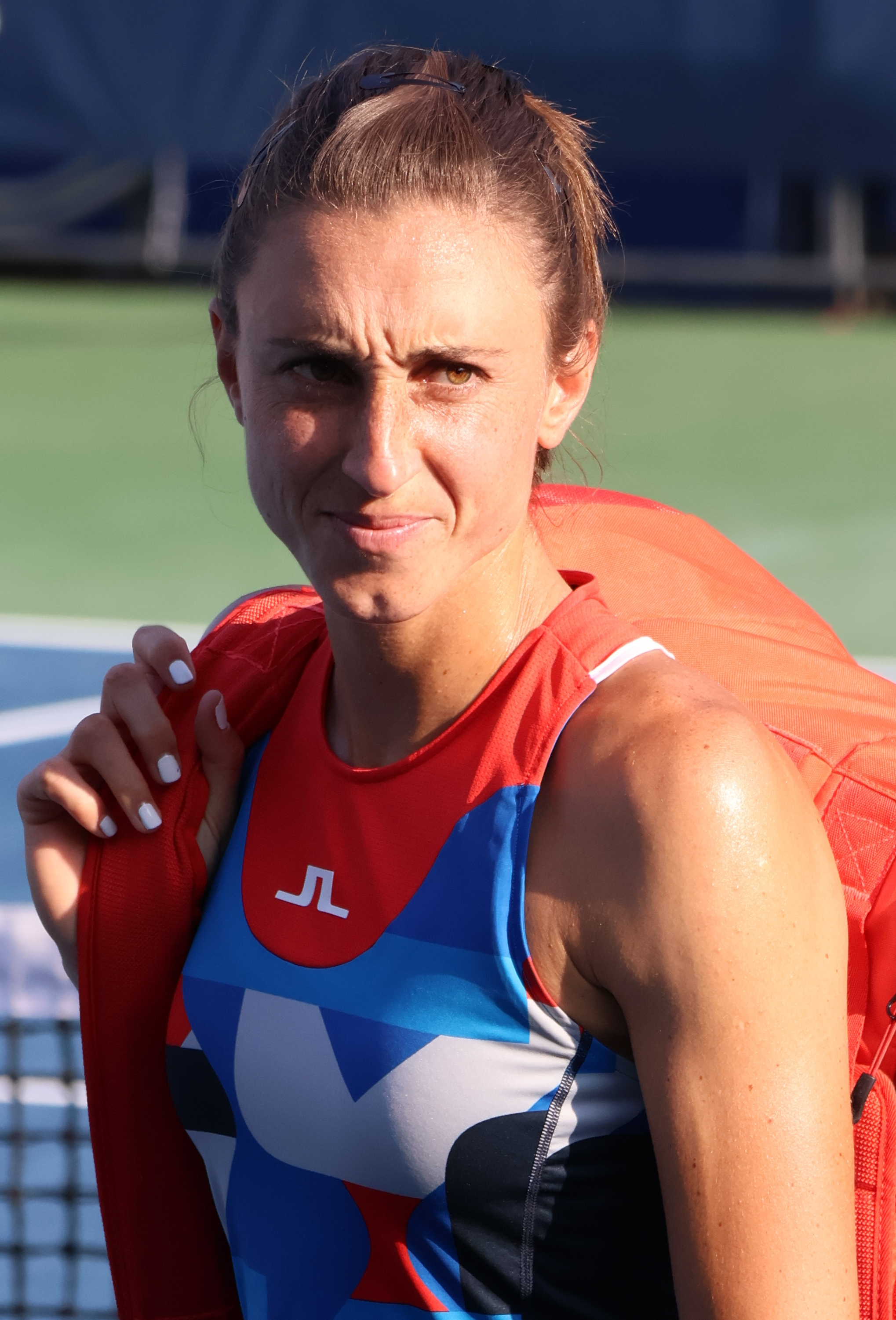
- Martić at the 2023 Washington Open
- Country (sports): Croatia
- Residence: Freeport, The Bahamas
- Born: 19 January 1991 (age 35) Split, Croatia, SFR Yugoslavia
- Height: 1.81 m (5 ft 11 in)
- Turned pro: July 2008
- Plays: Right-handed (two-handed backhand)
- Coach: Michael Geserer (2021–2024) Izo Zunic (2024–)
- Prize money: US$ 9,220,466

Singles
- Career record: 457–345
- Career titles: 2 WTA, 1 WTA Challenger
- Highest ranking: No. 14 (13 January 2020)

Grand Slam singles results
- Australian Open: 4R (2018)
- French Open: QF (2019)
- Wimbledon: 4R (2017, 2019, 2022)
- US Open: 4R (2019, 2020)

Other tournaments
- Olympic Games: 1R (2024)

Doubles
- Career record: 136–130
- Career titles: 1 WTA Challenger
- Highest ranking: No. 49 (21 February 2022)

Grand Slam doubles results
- Australian Open: QF (2022)
- French Open: QF (2021)
- Wimbledon: 3R (2012, 2013, 2019)
- US Open: 3R (2010)

Team competitions
- Fed Cup: 13–11
- Last updated on: 15 September 2026.

Petra Martić (Croatian pronunciation: [pêtra mâːrtitɕ]; born 19 January 1991) is a Croatian professional inactive tennis player. She has a career-high singles ranking of world No. 14, achieved in January 2020. Martić has won two singles titles on the WTA Tour, one singles and one doubles tournament on the WTA Challenger Tour, plus four singles and five doubles titles on the ITF Circuit.

== Early and personal life ==
Petra Martić was born in Split, Croatia, SFR Yugoslavia to Nenad (father) and Sandra (mother). She grew up in the village of Duće, 30 km from Split, and moved to Split at the age of ten. Her father died in a car accident when Petra was five. Petra is quoted as saying that her mother is a hero to her for managing to go through all this and raising Petra by herself, and that this motivates her to excel in tennis and bring joy to her family.

== Career highlights ==
=== 2006–2009: Early years ===
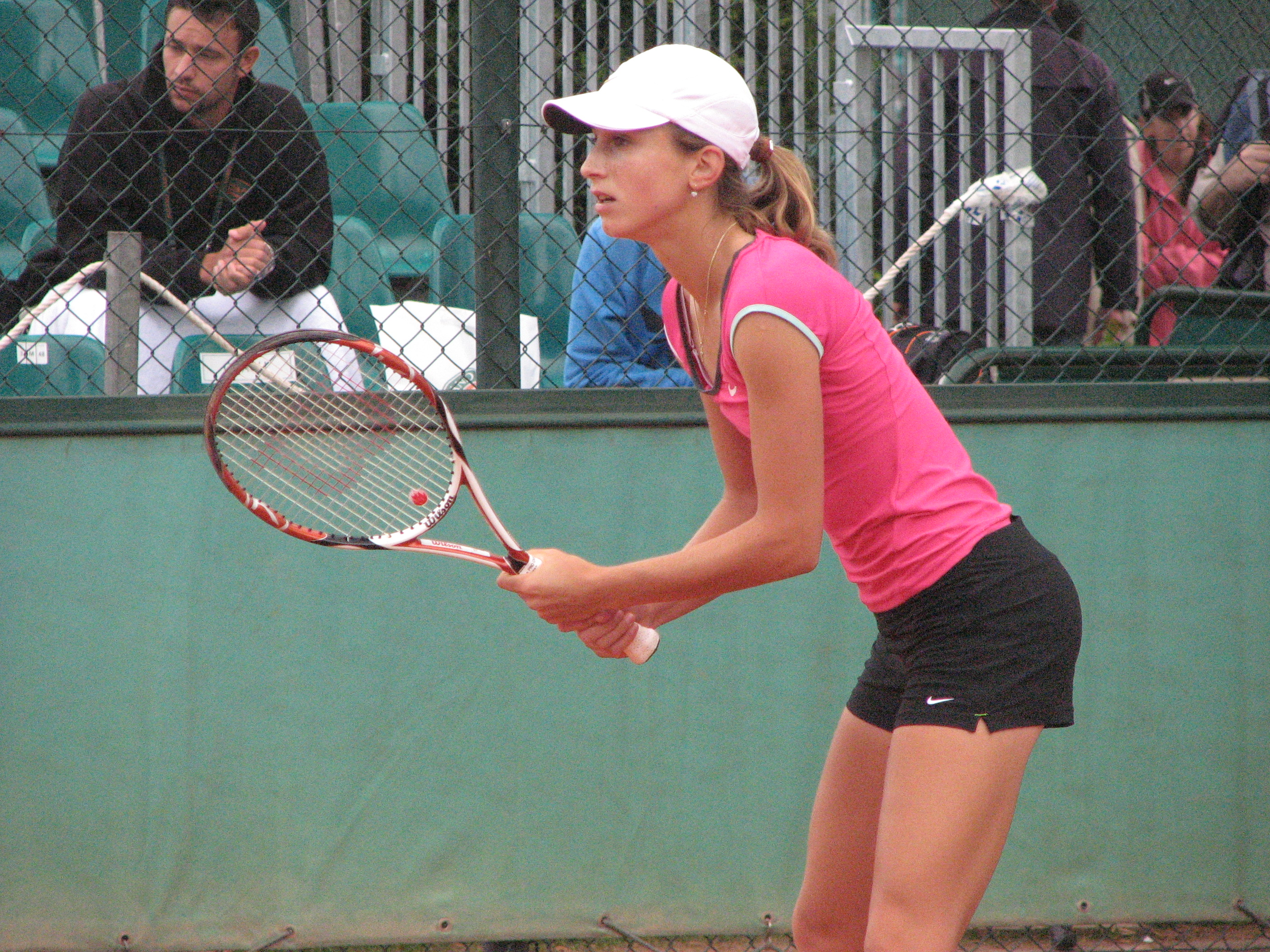
Martić at the 2009 French Open

The best result in her junior career was the quarterfinals in 2006 US Open. She played her first WTA Tour main draw match as a wildcard at Miami Open 2007, losing in the first round to Russian Alina Jidkova. In 2008, Martić won the Zagreb Ladies Open, defeating Yvonne Meusburger in the final, and then made it to the quarterfinals of the WTA Slovenia Open, losing to Julia Görges.

She qualified for the 2009 French Open and lost in the second round to 21-year-old Aleksandra Wozniak. She then made it to another Portorož Open quarterfinal, losing to Sara Errani. In September 2009, at the age of 18 years and 8 months, Martić entered top 100 for the first time (year-end ranking of 82).

=== 2010: First top-20 victory ===
Martić began the season by falling in the qualifying stages of the Auckland Open (lost to Chanelle Scheepers) and the Sydney International (lost to Kimiko Date-Krumm). She lost in the first round of the Australian Open, falling to Sabine Lisicki.

In February, she beat Yanina Wickmayer in the first round of the Open GdF Suez in Paris, then lost in the next round to Ágnes Szávay. Martić qualified for the Indian Wells Open where she lost in the second round to Jelena Janković. She also scored another big win at the Miami Open as she defeated Aravane Rezaï in the second round in three sets. She then lost to Yanina Wickmayer.

She lost in the first round of her next three tournaments, Andalucia Tennis Experience (lost to Estrella Cabeza Candela), Morocco Open (to Alizé Cornet ) and Portugal Open (to Kimiko Date-Krumm).

She was forced to retire in her first-round match of the Madrid Open whilst 4–6, 2–1 down. Her next tournament was the Warsaw Open where she lost in three sets to Gréta Arn, in the first round.

Martić was drawn against Elena Dementieva in the first round of the French Open, losing 6–1, 6–1. She next participated in the ITF tournament in Marseilles where she reached the quarterfinals, losing to Johanna Larsson in three sets.

Martić only played one grass-court tournament in the 2010 season at Wimbledon. There, she beat Elena Baltacha in the first round. She was due to play against Marion Bartoli in the second round; but she retired before the match.

At the hardcourt tournaments, she lost in the first round of Slovenia Open to Katarina Srebotnik and in the first round of İstanbul Cup to Vera Dushevina. Martić lost to Caroline Wozniacki in the first edition of the Danish Open.

=== 2011: First top-50 finish ===
Martić qualified for the Australian Open, where she lost to Agnieszka Radwańska in the second round. Martić also made it to the semifinals of Bogotá (lost to Domínguez Lino) and Copenhagen (lost to Hradecká) and beat Vesnina and Vickmayer to reach the third round of Cincinnati. She finished the year ranked inside the top 50 (at no. 49) for the first time in her career.

=== 2012: First WTA Tour final ===
Martić started the 2012 season losing in the first rounds of several tournaments including the Australian Open, Doha, and Dubai.

She reached her first WTA final at the Malaysian Open where she upset Peng Shuai in the quarterfinals and Jelena Janković in the semifinals. However, she retired in the final against Hsieh Su-wei at 4–1 down in the third set due to fatigue and severe cramping, which she was suffering due to having defeated Janković just that morning in a marathon match that lasted over three hours.

After falling in the first rounds of Indian Wells and Miami, Martić made the semifinals of the Danish Open, losing to Caroline Wozniacki, and the quarterfinals of the Budapest Grand Prix, losing to Elena Vesnina.

Martić achieved a major breakthrough at the French Open. After defeating Michaëlla Krajicek in the first round, she recorded the biggest win of her career in the second round, upsetting Marion Bartoli in three sets. This was Martić's first win against a top 10 player and the first time she advanced beyond the second round at any Grand Slam tournament. She lost in the fourth round to Angelique Kerber. Her performance in Paris helped lift her to a career-high ranking of 42.

At both Wimbledon and the US Open, Martić struggled with being drawn against unfavorable first-round opponents. She drew grass court phenom Sabine Lisicki in the first round of Wimbledon, losing 6–4, 6–2, and at the US Open, she lost to defending champion Samantha Stosur. She bounced back at the Pan Pacific Open, upsetting Petra Kvitová in the second round. It was the first meeting between the two and the second top-10 victory of the year for Martić.

=== 2013–2016: Struggling with injuries ===
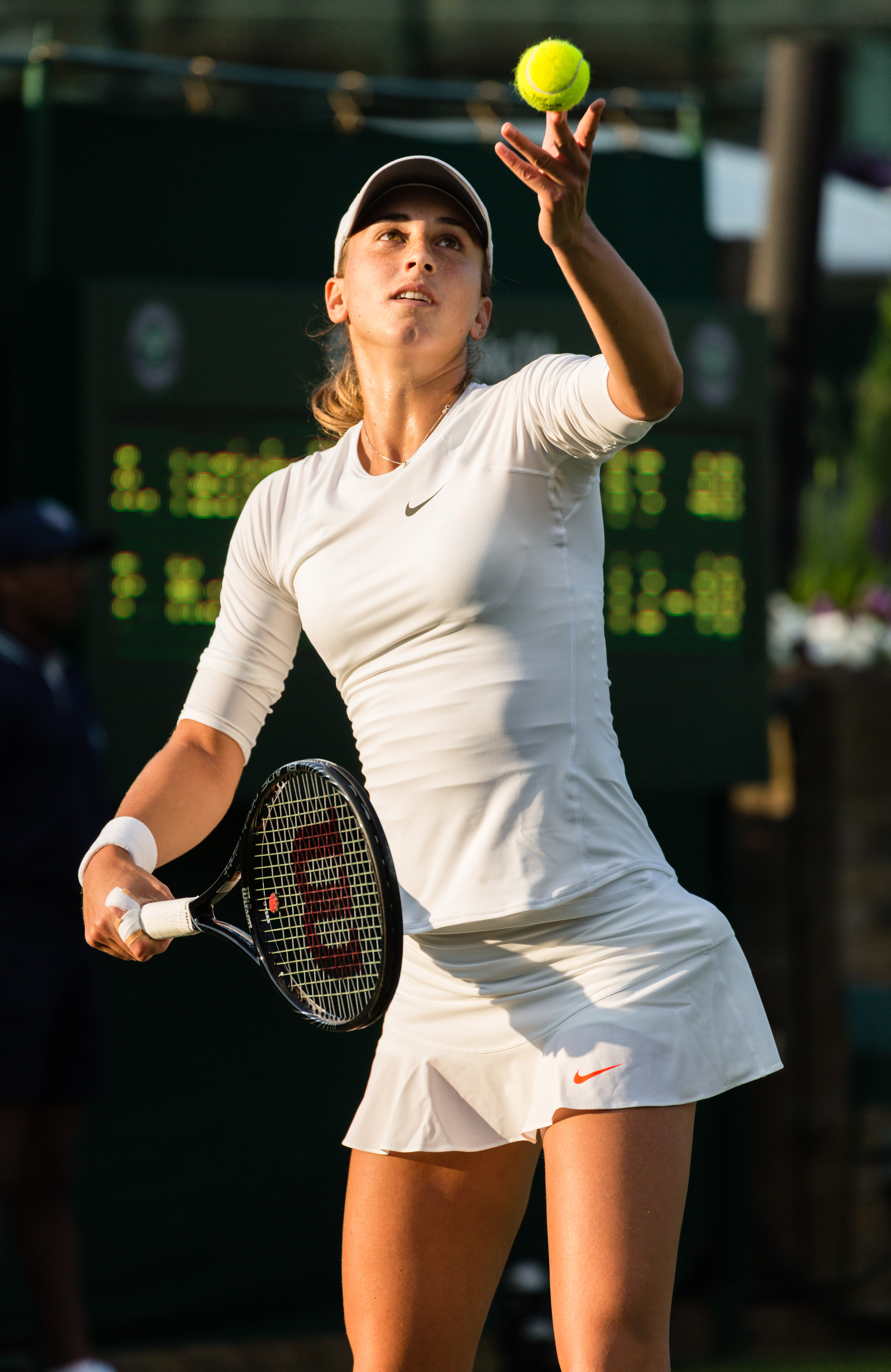
Martić at the 2013 Wimbledon Championships

The next four years of her career were plagued by injuries and poor form. In 2013, Martić made it to the third round of a WTA tournament only twice (at Katowice and Wimbledon). She also won the 2013 Nottingham Trophy (def. Karolina Plíšková in the final), but fel from the top 100 by the end of the year. In 2014, she scored only one WTA Tour main-draw victory, against Sorana Cîrstea in Guangzhou in September. In 2015, Martić mostly played at ITF and WTA 125 tournaments, with moderate success. The only notable result was qualifying for the Australian Open (losing to Sharapova). She finished 2015 season in October, not scoring a single victory at a WTA Tour main draw and only two top-100 victories during the year. She was ranked no. 148 at the end of the year.

In February 2016, she made it to the semifinals of a WTA event for the first time in four years at Rio de Janeiro in February, defeating Teliana Pereira and then losing to Francesca Schiavone), and she did not play from February to May. The last match she played was at Wimbledon in June, where she lost to Ursula Radwańska in the first round of qualifying. In September, she dropped out of the top 200.

=== 2017–2018: Comeback ===
Suffering from a major back injury (disc protrusion in her lower back), Martić was not sure if she would play competitive tennis again.

After a ten-month injury lay-off, she made a come-back at 25k event at Santa Margherita di Pula. Ranked no. 659, Martić went through qualifying, and she eventually won the tournament (def. von Deichmann in the final). She then went on a 17–3 run leading up to 2017 French Open, reaching the final of three more ITF tournaments. Martić then qualified to her first Grand Slam main draw in two years (despite being down a match point in the final round of qualifying against Maryna Zanevska). She recorded her first Grand Slam main-draw win since Wimbledon 2013 by defeating Kateryna Bondarenko in straight sets. She then upset Madison Keys in the second round (her first victory over any player inside the top 20 since September 2012) in a three-set comeback win, then defeated Anastasija Sevastova, then lost to Elina Svitolina in the fourth round after having a 5–2 lead in the third set. However, her resurgence at the French Open brought her back inside the top 150, cutting her ranking by more than half from 290th to 129th. Seeded 16th (and given another protected ranking) for the qualifying rounds at Wimbledon, Martić qualified for her second consecutive major main draw, defeating Aleksandra Krunić in her final match. She continued her resurgence by upsetting Daria Gavrilova in the first round, winning 10–8 in the third set. She then recorded straight-set wins over Denisa Allertová and Zarina Diyas to advance to her second consecutive major fourth-round appearance (third overall and first outside the French Open), where she was defeated by Magdaléna Rybáriková. This result brought her back inside the top 100 for the first time since April 2014. After Wimbledon, Martić played only four more tournaments, going 2–4, but finished the year inside the top 100 (at no. 89) for the first time since 2012.

Continuing her success from 2017, Martić made it to the fourth round of the 2018 Australian Open (her third consecutive major fourth round, and first on hardcourts), losing to Elise Mertens in straight sets, and reached her first quarterfinal at a Premier Mandatory event in Indian Wells (defeating Jeļena Ostapenko en route) and then losing to Simona Halep in three sets. She made it to the final of the Bucharest Open, her first WTA final in six years, but lost to Sevastova. Despite losing in the second round of the French Open, and the first round of Wimbledon and the US Open, Martić won the biggest title of her career in September by defeating Mona Barthel at the Chicago Challenger, her first WTA 125 title. She finished the year ranked no. 32 in the world, her best year-end ranking to date and the second top-50 finish of her career.

=== 2019: First WTA Tour title, major quarterfinal and top 15 year-end ranking ===
Martić had a slow start to the year. Outside of a solid showing at the Australian Open (where she was seeded 31st, her first time being seeded at a major event, and advanced to the third round, losing to Sloane Stephens), Martić lost four of five matches in the first three months of the year. She regrouped and reached the semifinals of the Charleston Open in April, defeating former top-10 player Belinda Bencic. At her next event, the İstanbul Cup, she reached her third career final, coming back from a set down in her first two matches as well as defeating Kristina Mladenovic in the quarterfinals. She then recorded another come-from-behind victory, defeating Markéta Vondroušová in the final to win her first career WTA singles title. Martić then made it to the quarterfinals of the Madrid Open, defeating Garbiñe Muguruza and compatriot Donna Vekić along the way, and then losing to Sloane Stephens. In April, she was nominated for the WTA Player of the Month. On 13 May, she entered the top 30 for the first time in her career – seven years, seven months and 18 days after first entering the top 50.

Seeded 31st at the French Open, Martić defeated Ons Jabeur and Mladenovic to reach the third round where she upset Karolína Plíšková in straight sets. This win was her first over a top three-ranked player. She then defeated six-time Grand Slam quarterfinalist Kaia Kanepi in the fourth round to reach her first major quarterfinal, becoming the first Croatian female tennis player to do so since Iva Majoli in 1998. There, she was defeated by Vondroušová in a rematch of the Istanbul final. This result lifted her into the top 25 for the first time.

Following the French Open, Martić then reached her first grass-court semifinal at the Birmingham Classic, saving five match points against Ostapenko in her quarterfinal match, then losing to Julia Görges. Seeded 24th at Wimbledon, she matched her best result at this tournament by reaching the fourth round for the second time (recording three set wins over Jennifer Brady, Anastasia Potapova, and Australian Open semifinalist Danielle Collins) where she lost to Svitolina. Following Wimbledon, she broke into the top 20 for the first time.

However, Martić lost her opening-round matches in Toronto and Cincinnati, but rebounded at the US Open, where she was seeded 22nd. After beating Tamara Zidanšek and Ana Bogdan to advance to the third round for the first time, she then upset the Anastasija Sevastova (who was carrying a streak of three straight US Open quarterfinal appearances), to reach the second week of a major for the third consecutive time. She lost to Serena Williams in the fourth round in straight sets. Martić carried her momentum to the start of the Asian hardcourt swing. In Zhengzhou, she reached her first Premier-level final, after beating Aryna Sabalenka in the quarterfinals and Mladenovic in the semifinals to face Plíšková for the first time since upsetting her at the French Open. However, she was unable to repeat that result, as she was defeated in straight sets. She also reached quarterfinals at the Premier-5 level Wuhan Open losing to Ashleigh Barty. Following this, she climbed to a new career-high ranking of no. 17 in the world. Martić's strong performances all season helped qualify her to the WTA Elite Trophy for the first time in her career. Seeded fifth and drawn into the Orchid Group, she beat wildcard Zheng Saisai, but lost to Madison Keys in straight sets. Despite all three group members finishing with an identical win–loss record and identical set win–loss record, Zheng advanced to the semifinals on a second tiebreaker, ending Martić's season. Nonetheless, she finished the year with a career-high ranking of world no. 15.

=== 2020: Two WTA Tour semifinals, US Open 4th round ===
Martić had another slow start to the year losing in the second round of the Auckland Open and the Australian Open (which ended her streak of reaching the second week of majors), as well as being upset in the opening round of Hua Hin. Still, on 13 January she reached her singles career-high ranking of no. 14 in the world. Then she made an impressive run into the semifinals of Dubai Championships without dropping, and then lost to Elena Rybakina in two tie-break sets. However, she was upset by Barbora Strýcová in the first round of the Qatar Ladies Open.

After the resumption of the WTA Tour in August, Martić reached her second semifinal of the year at the Palermo Ladies Open, losing to Anett Kontaveit in straight sets. She then participated in the Prague Open where she beat Varvara Gracheva in straight sets, then losing to Kristýna Plíšková. Seeded eighth at the 2020 US Open, she lost in the fourth round to Yulia Putintseva. She finished the year ranked No 18. in the world, her second year-end top 20 finish.

=== 2021: WTA 1000 SF, French and Australian Open QFs in doubles ===
2021 season was a year marred with injuries and inconsistencies for Martić. She lost to qualifier Olga Danilović, in the first round of the Australian Open. Martić did not make it past the first round in nine other tournaments. However, she reached her first semifinal of a WTA 1000 tournament in her career at the Italian Open defeating Jessica Pegula. By the end of the year, Martić dropped out of the top 50 for the first time since April 2019.

In doubles, she reached the quarterfinals of the French Open with partner Shelby Rogers. The pair also reached the quarterfinals at the Madrid Open.

=== 2022: Return to top 50, second career singles title ===
Partnering Shelby Rogers at the Australian Open, the duo was beaten again in the quarterfinals. After two consecutive first-round losses, Martić scored her first WTA Tour match win of the season against Kamilla Rakhimova at the St. Petersburg Ladies' Trophy in February.

She bounced back at the Indian Wells Open when she scored four consecutive victories (three against top-30 players) to reach the quarterfinals where she lost to Simona Halep. In Rome, she beat Anett Kontaveit in the second round for her first top-5 victory since 2019 French Open. She also reached her third Wimbledon fourth round, beating Jessica Pegula and losing to the eventual champion Elena Rybakina, 5–7, 3–6. In July, she won her second career singles title at the Ladies Open Lausanne, beating Belinda Bencic in the quarterfinal, Caroline Garcia in the semifinal, and qualifier Olga Danilović in the final. At the US Open, Martić reached the third round by defeating Paula Badosa in three sets, and then losing to Victoria Azarenka. At the Pan Pacific Open in September, she beat Karolina Plíšková, then lost to Zhang Shuai in the quarterfinals.

=== 2023–24: Return to top 30, second Madrid QF ===
At the 2023 Madrid Open, she reached her second quarterfinal at this tournament defeating Barbora Krejčíková. As a result, she was ranked as world No. 28 on 8 May 2023.

She fell out of the top 100 on 19 August 2024 but reached the round of 16 at the WTA 500 Monterrey Open and returned into the top 100 a week later before the US Open.

=== 2025: Linz quarterfinal ===
Martić qualified for the main draw at the Linz Open and defeated wildcard entrant Eva Lys and Elina Avanesyan to reach the quarterfinals, in which she lost to Ekaterina Alexandrova.

== Playing style ==
Martić employs an aggressive all-court game that exemplifies her variety. Her groundstrokes are powerful, and she is able to hit both her forehand and her backhand flat and with topspin. She is also proficient at hitting her backhand with slice and incorporates the drop shot effectively into points. As a result, she continually disrupts baseline rallies, creating opportunities to hit winners, or forcing opponents to commit errors. Her serve is powerful, being recorded as high as 120 mph (190 km/h) while having minimal double faults. Her return of serve is also a major weapon, ranking consistently within the top 100 of the WTA for return games won. She is a strong volleyer, due to her doubles experience. She is capable of extending rallies, acting more like a counterpuncher, to draw unforced errors out of highly aggressive players, possessing a complete defensive game. She is proficient at playing on all surfaces, and the majority of her success has come on clay courts.

== Performance timelines ==
Key
W	F	SF	QF	#R	RR	Q#	P#	DNQ	A	Z#	PO	G	S	B	NMS	NTI	P	NH

(W) winner; (F) finalist; (SF) semifinalist; (QF) quarterfinalist; (#R) rounds 4, 3, 2, 1; (RR) round-robin stage; (Q#) qualification round; (P#) preliminary round; (DNQ) did not qualify; (A) absent; (Z#) Davis/Fed Cup Zonal Group (with number indication) or (PO) play-off; (G) gold, (S) silver or (B) bronze Olympic/Paralympic medal; (NMS) not a Masters tournament; (NTI) not a Tier I tournament; (P) postponed; (NH) not held; (SR) strike rate (events won / competed); (W–L) win–loss record.
To avoid confusion and double counting, these charts are updated at the conclusion of a tournament or when the player's participation has ended.

Only main-draw results in WTA Tour, Grand Slam tournaments, Fed Cup/Billie Jean King Cup and Olympic Games are included in win–loss records.

=== Singles ===
Current through the 2025 WTA Tour.

Tournament	2007	2008	2009	2010	2011	2012	2013	2014	2015	2016	2017	2018	2019	2020	2021	2022	2023	2024	2025	SR	W–L	Win %
Grand Slam tournaments
Australian Open	A	A	Q1	1R	2R	1R	1R	1R	1R	Q1	A	4R	3R	2R	1R	1R	2R	1R	1R	0 / 14	8–14	36%
French Open	A	A	2R	1R	Q1	4R	1R	1R	1R	Q2	4R	2R	QF	3R	1R	1R	2R	2R	Q1	0 / 14	16–14	53%
Wimbledon	A	A	A	2R	2R	1R	3R	1R	Q1	Q1	4R	1R	4R	NH	2R	4R	3R	2R	1R	0 / 13	17–13	57%
US Open	A	Q1	2R	1R	2R	1R	A	Q1	Q3	A	1R	1R	4R	4R	2R	3R	2R	1R	Q2	0 / 13	12–12	50%
Win–loss	0–0	0–0	2–2	1–4	3–3	3–4	2–3	0–3	0–2	0–0	6–3	4–4	12–4	6–3	2–4	5–4	5–4	2–4	0–2	0 / 53	53–53	50%
Year-end championships
WTA Elite Trophy (Note: WTA Tournament of Champions was held from 2009 to 2014, when WTA Elite Trophy replaced it.)	DNQ												RR	NH			DNQ	NH		0 / 1	1–1	50%
Olympics
Olympics	NH	A	NH			A	NH			A	NH				A	NH		1R	NH	0 / 1	0–1	0%
WTA 1000
Qatar Open (Note: The first Premier 5 event of the year has switched back and forth between the Dubai Tennis Championships and the Qatar Ladies Open since 2009. Dubai was classified as a Premier 5 event from 2009 to 2011, and then it was succeeded by Doha for the 2012–2014 period. In 2015, Dubai regained its Premier 5 status, and Doha was demoted to Premier status. The Premier 5 tournaments were reclassified as WTA 1000 tournaments in 2021.)	NMS	A	NMS			1R	A	1R	NMS	A	NMS	A	NMS	1R	NMS	A	NMS	2R	A	0 / 4	1–4	20%
Dubai	NMS		A	A	A	NMS			A	NMS	A	NMS	1R	NMS	1R	NMS	1R	2R	A	0 / 4	1–4	20%
Indian Wells Open	A	A	1R	2R	Q2	1R	1R	Q1	A	A	A	QF	1R	NH	2R	QF	2R	1R	Q1	0 / 10	11–10	52%
Miami Open	1R	A	Q1	3R	2R	1R	1R	Q1	A	A	A	3R	2R	NH	2R	Q1	3R	1R	Q1	0 / 10	7–10	41%
Madrid Open	NH		A	Q1	A	1R	A	A	A	A	A	2R	QF (Note: Martić's walkover victory in the second round does not count as a win.)	NH	1R	2R	QF	A	A	0 / 6	7–6	54%
Italian Open	A	A	A	A	A	Q1	Q1	A	A	A	A	2R	A	2R	SF	3R	2R	1R	A	0 / 6	6–6	50%
Canadian Open	A	A	A	A	2R	A	1R	Q1	A	A	A	A	1R	NH	1R	A	2R	A	A	0 / 5	2–5	29%
Cincinnati Open	NMS		A	A	3R	A	1R	A	A	A	Q2	2R	1R	A	1R	1R	2R	A	A	0 / 7	4–7	36%
Pan Pacific / Wuhan Open (Note: In 2014, the Pan Pacific Open was downgraded to a Premier event and replaced by the Wuhan Open. The Premier 5 tournaments were reclassified as WTA 1000 tournaments in 2021.)	A	A	A	A	A	3R	A	A	A	A	A	A		QF	NH				A	0 / 2	5–2	71%
China Open	NMS		A	A	Q1	Q1	Q1	A	A	A	A	2R	1R	NH			2R	A	A	0 / 3	2–3	40%
Guadalajara Open	NH															A	A	NMS		0 / 0	0–0	–
Career statistics
Tournaments	1	1	7	14	14	18	12	8	8	2	4	17	18	11	20	18	9	19	4	Career total: 205		
Titles	0	0	0	0	0	0	0	0	0	0	0	0	1	0	0	1	0	0	0	Career total: 2		
Finals	0	0	0	0	0	1	0	0	0	0	0	1	2	0	0	1	1	0	0	Career total: 6		
Hard win–loss	0–1	2–1	3–4	4–8	11–9	13–13	1–6	1–5	0–4	0–1	0–2	18–10	14–12	8–7	7–12	11–9	12–12	5–11	3–3	0 / 125	109–127	46%
Clay win–loss	0–0	0–0	3–3	0–5	4–3	5–4	4–5	0–2	0–4	3–1	3–1	7–5	15–3	6–4	6–5	12–5	4–4	4–7	0–0	2 / 62	76–60	56%
Grass win–loss	0–0	0–0	0–0	1–0	1–1	0–1	2–1	0–1	0–0	0–0	3–1	1–2	6–2	0–0	2–3	3–3	2–1	1–2	0–1	0 / 21	22–19	54%
Overall win–loss	0–1	2–1	6–7	5–13	16–13	18–18	7–12	1–8	0–8	3–2	6–4	26–17	35–17	14–11	15–20	26–17	18–17	10–20	3–4	2 / 208	210–209	50%
Win (%)	0%	67%	46%	28%	55%	50%	37%	11%	0%	60%	60%	60%	67%	56%	43%	60%	51%	33%	43%	Career total: 50%		
Year-end ranking	325	214	84	144	49	59	116	179	144	266	89	32	15	18	54	39	40	123	211	$7,250,018		

=== Doubles ===
Tournament	2009	2010	2011	2012	2013	2014	2015	2016	2017	2018	2019	2020	2021	2022	2023	SR	W–L	Win%
Grand Slam tournaments
Australian Open	A	1R	1R	3R	1R	3R	1R	A	A	A	3R	A	A	QF	A	0 / 8	9–8	53%
French Open	A	2R	1R	2R	1R	A	1R	A	A	1R	2R	A	QF	1R	A	0 / 9	6–9	40%
Wimbledon	A	2R	A	3R	3R	A	1R	A	A	2R	3R	NH	2R	A	A	0 / 7	9–7	56%
US Open	A	3R	1R	1R	1R	A	A	A	1R	1R	A	A	2R	A	A	0 / 7	3–7	30%
Win–loss	0–0	4–4	0–3	5–4	2–4	2–1	0–3	0–0	0–1	1–3	5–3	0–0	5–3	3–2	0–0	0 / 31	27–31	47%
WTA 1000
Dubai / Qatar Open	A	A	A	A	A	1R	A	A	A	A	A	A	A	A		0 / 1	0–1	0%
Indian Wells Open	A	A	A	A	A	2R	A	A	A	A	A	NH	A	1R		0 / 2	1–2	33%
Miami Open	2R	A	1R	2R	2R	1R	A	A	A	A	A	NH	2R	A		0 / 6	4–6	40%
Madrid Open	A	A	A	A	A	A	A	A	A	A	A	NH	QF	A		0 / 1	2–1	67%
Italian Open	A	A	A	1R	QF	A	A	A	A	A	A	A	1R	A		0 / 2	2–2	50%
Canadian Open	A	A	A	A	1R	A	A	A	A	A	A	NH	A	A		0 / 1	0–1	0%
Cincinnati Open	A	A	A	A	A	A	A	A	A	A	1R	A	1R	1R		0 / 3	0–3	0%
Pan Pacific / Wuhan Open	A	A	A	A	A	A	A	A	A	A	A	NH				0 / 0	0–0	–
China Open	A	A	A	1R	A	A	A	A	A	2R	A	NH				0 / 2	1–2	33%
Mexican Open	NMS/NH													A		0 / 0	0–0	–
Career statistics
Tournaments	2	10	13	14	13	10	12	2	1	4	5	0	9	4		Career total: 99		
Overall win–loss																0 / 99		

== WTA Tour finals ==
=== Singles: 6 (2 titles, 4 runner-ups) ===
Legend WTA 500 (0–1) WTA 250 (2–3)	Finals by surface Hard (0–3) Clay (2–1)	Finals by setting Outdoor (2–3) Indoor (0–1)

Result	W–L	Date	Tournament	Tier	Surface	Opponent	Score
Loss	0–1	Mar 2012	Malaysian Open, Malaysia	International (Note: The WTA International tournaments were reclassified as WTA 250 tournaments in 2021.)	Hard	(Chinese Taipei) Hsieh Su-wei	6–2, 5–7, 1–4 ret.
Loss	0–2	Jul 2018	Bucharest Open, Romania	International	Clay	(Latvia) Anastasija Sevastova	6–7^{(4–7)}, 2–6
Win	1–2	Apr 2019	İstanbul Cup, Turkey	International	Clay	(Czech Republic) Markéta Vondroušová	1–6, 6–4, 6–1
Loss	1–3	Sep 2019	Zhengzhou Open, China	Premier (Note: The WTA Premier tournaments were reclassified as WTA 500 tournaments in 2021.)	Hard	(Czech Republic) Karolína Plíšková	3–6, 2–6
Win	2–3	Jul 2022	Ladies Open Lausanne, Switzerland	WTA 250	Clay	(Serbia) Olga Danilović	6–4, 6–2
Loss	2–4	Feb 2023	Linz Open, Austria	WTA 250	Hard (i)	Anastasia Potapova	3–6, 1–6

=== Doubles: 4 (4 runner-ups) ===
Legend WTA 500 (0–1) WTA 250 (0–3)	Finals by surface Hard (0–2) Clay (0–2)	Finals by setting Outdoor (0–3) Indoor (0–1)

Result	W–L	Date	Tournament	Tier	Surface	Partner	Opponents	Score
Loss	0–1	Feb 2012	Open GDF Suez, France	Premier	Hard (i)	(Germany) Anna-Lena Grönefeld	(United States) Liezel Huber (United States) Lisa Raymond	6–7^{(3–7)}, 1–6
Loss	0–2	Jun 2012	Austrian Open, Austria	International	Clay	(Germany) Anna-Lena Grönefeld	(United States) Jill Craybas (Germany) Julia Görges	7–6^{(7–4)}, 4–6, [9–11]
Loss	0–3	Apr 2013	Marrakesh Grand Prix, Morocco	International	Clay	(France) Kristina Mladenovic	(Hungary) Tímea Babos (Luxembourg) Mandy Minella	3–6, 1–6
Loss	0–4	Mar 2016	Monterrey Open, Mexico	International	Hard	(United States) Maria Sanchez	(Spain) Anabel Medina Garrigues (Spain) Arantxa Parra Santonja	6–4, 5–7, [7–10]

== WTA 125 finals ==
=== Singles: 1 (title) ===
Result	W–L	Date	Tournament	Surface	Opponent	Score
Win	1–0	Sep 2018	Chicago Challenger, United States	Hard	(Germany) Mona Barthel	6–4, 6–1

=== Doubles: 1 (title) ===
Result	W–L	Date	Tournament	Surface	Partner	Opponents	Score
Win	1–0	May 2016	Bol Ladies Open, Croatia	Clay	(Switzerland) Xenia Knoll	(Romania) Raluca Olaru (Turkey) İpek Soylu	6–3, 6–2

== ITF Circuit finals ==
Legend
$100,000 tournaments
$75,000 tournaments
$50,000 tournaments
$25,000 tournaments

=== Singles: 7 (4 titles, 3 runner-ups) ===
Result	W–L	Date	Tournament	Tier	Surface	Opponent	Score
Loss	0–1	Oct 2007	ITF Jersey, United Kingdom	25,000	Hard	(Germany) Sabine Lisicki	3–6, 4–6
Win	1–1	Jul 2008	Zagreb Ladies Open, Croatia	75,000	Clay	(Austria) Yvonne Meusburger	6–2, 2–6, 6–2
Win	2–1	Sep 2009	ITF Biella, Italy	100,000	Clay	(Canada) Sharon Fichman	7–5, 6–4
Win	3–1	Jun 2013	Nottingham Trophy, UK	75,000	Grass	(Czech Republic) Karolína Plíšková	6–3, 6–3
Loss	3–2	Nov 2014	South Seas Island Classic, United States	50,000	Hard	(Romania) Edina Gallovits-Hall	2–6, 2–6
Win	4–2	Apr 2017	ITF Pula, Italy	25,000	Clay	(Liechtenstein) Kathinka von Deichmann	6–4, 7–5
Loss	4–3	May 2017	Wiesbaden Open, Germany	25,000	Clay	(Liechtenstein) Kathinka von Deichmann	4–6, 6–4, 6–7^{(7)}

=== Doubles: 8 (5 titles, 3 runner-ups) ===
Result	W–L	Date	Tournament	Tier	Surface	Partner	Opponents	Score
Win	1–0	May 2009	Zagreb Ladies Open, Croatia	50,000	Clay	(Croatia) Ajla Tomljanović	(Belarus) Ksenia Milevskaya (Russia) Anastasia Pivovarova	6–3, 6–7^{(4)}, [10–5]
Loss	1–1	Sep 2009	Sofia Cup, Bulgaria	100,000	Clay	(Slovenia) Polona Hercog	(Switzerland) Timea Bacsinszky (Italy) Tathiana Garbin	2–6, 6–7^{(4)}
Loss	1–2	Oct 2010	ITF Athens, Greece	50,000	Hard	(Greece) Eleni Daniilidou	(Russia) Vitalia Diatchenko (Turkey) İpek Şenoğlu	w/o
Win	2–2	Dec 2010	Dubai Tennis Challenge, UAE	75,000	Hard	(Germany) Julia Görges	(India) Sania Mirza (Czech Republic) Vladimíra Uhlířová	6–4, 7–6^{(7)}
Win	3–2	May 2011	Open de Cagnes-sur-Mer, France	100,000	Clay	(Germany) Anna-Lena Grönefeld	(Croatia) Darija Jurak (Czech Republic) Renata Voráčová	1–6, 6–2, [11–9]
Win	4–2	Oct 2014	Abierto Tampico, Mexico	50,000	Hard	(United States) Maria Sanchez	(Russia) Valeria Savinykh (Ukraine) Kateryna Bondarenko	3–6, 6–3, [10–2]
Win	5–2	Feb 2015	Burnie International, Australia	50,000	Hard	(United States) Irina Falconi	(China) Han Xinyun (Japan) Junri Namigata	6–2, 6–4
Loss	5–3	May 2015	Empire Slovak Open, Slovakia	100,000	Clay	(Serbia) Aleksandra Krunić	(Ukraine) Yuliya Beygelzimer (Russia) Margarita Gasparyan	3–6, 2–6

== WTA Tour career earnings ==
Current through the 2023 Wimbledon Championships.

Year	Grand Slam titles	WTA titles	Total titles	Earnings ($)	Money list rank
2010	0	0	0	182,922	98
2011	0	0	0	220,227	94
2012	0	0	0	367,866	60
2013	0	0	0	279,881	93
2014	0	0	0	185,345	130
2015	0	0	0	156,506	154
2016	0	0	0	40,510	275
2017	0	0	0	477,469	76
2018	0	0	0	846,742	44
2019	0	1	1	1,891,881	21
2020	0	0	0	729,576	21
2021	0	0	0	684,143	50
2022	0	1	1	1,009,913	38
2023	0	0	0	795,881	34
Career	0	2	2	8,045,899	90

== Career Grand Slam statistics ==
=== Seedings ===
The tournaments won by Martić are in boldface, and advanced into finals by Martić are in italics.

Year	Australian Open	French Open	Wimbledon	US Open
2008	absent	absent	absent	did not qualify
2009	did not qualify	qualifier	absent	qualifier
2010	not seeded	not seeded	not seeded	not seeded
2011	qualifier	did not qualify	not seeded	not seeded
2012	not seeded	not seeded	not seeded	not seeded
2013	not seeded	not seeded	not seeded	absent
2014	not seeded	not seeded	not seeded	did not qualify
2015	qualifier	qualifier	did not qualify	did not qualify
2016	did not qualify	did not qualify	did not qualify	absent
2017	absent	qualifier	qualifier	not seeded
2018	not seeded	not seeded	not seeded	not seeded
2019	31st	31st	24th	22nd
2020	13th	13th	cancelled	8th
2021	16th	22nd	26th	30th
2022	not seeded	not seeded	not seeded	not seeded
2023	not seeded	not seeded	30th	not seeded
2024	not seeded	not seeded	not seeded	not seeded

== Top-10 wins ==
- Martić has a 8–30 record against players who were, at the time the match was played, ranked in the top 10.

Season	2012	...	2018	2019	...	2022	2023	Total
Wins	2		1	1		3	1	8

#	Player	Rank	Event	Surface	Rd	Score	PMR
2012
1.	(France) Marion Bartoli	No. 8	French Open	Clay	2R	6–2, 3–6, 6–3	No. 50
2.	(Czech Republic) Petra Kvitová	No. 5	Pan Pacific Open, Japan	Hard	2R	6–4, 6–4	No. 73
2018
3.	(Latvia) Jeļena Ostapenko	No. 6	Indian Wells Open, US	Hard	3R	6–3, 6–3	No. 51
2019
4.	(Czech Republic) Karolína Plíšková	No. 2	French Open	Clay	3R	6–3, 6–3	No. 31
2022
5.	(Estonia) Anett Kontaveit	No. 5	Italian Open	Clay	2R	6–2, 6–3	No. 47
6.	(United States) Jessica Pegula	No. 9	Wimbledon, UK	Grass	3R	6–2, 7–6^{(7–5)}	No. 80
7.	(Spain) Paula Badosa	No. 4	US Open, United States	Hard	2R	6–7^{(5–7)}, 6–1, 6–2	No. 54
2023
8.	(Greece) Maria Sakkari	No. 7	Linz Open, Austria	Hard (i)	SF	3–6, 6–3, 6–4	No. 34
