= 2016 ASB Classic – Women's singles =

Women's singles
- 2016 ASB Classic

Final
- Champion: (United States) Sloane Stephens
- Runner-up: (Germany) Julia Görges
- Score: 7–5, 6–2

Details
- Draw: 32 (4 Q / 3 WC )
- Seeds: 8

Events
Singles	men	women
Doubles	men	women
← 2015 ·	ASB Classic	· 2017 →

Venus Williams was the defending champion, but lost in the first round to Daria Kasatkina.

Sloane Stephens won the title, defeating Julia Görges in the final, 7–5, 6–2.

== Seeds ==
1. (United States) Venus Williams (first round)
2. (Serbia) Ana Ivanovic (first round)
3. (Denmark) Caroline Wozniacki (semifinals)
4. (Russia) Svetlana Kuznetsova (second round)
5. (United States) Sloane Stephens (champion)
6. (United States) Coco Vandeweghe (first round)
7. (Czech Republic) Barbora Strýcová (second round)
8. (Belgium) Alison Van Uytvanck (first round)

== Draw ==
=== Key ===
- Q = Qualifier
- WC = Wild card
- LL = Lucky loser
- Alt = Alternate
- ITF = ITF entry
- PR = Protected ranking
- SR = Special ranking
- SE = Special exempt
- JE = Junior exempt
- JR = Junior Accelerator Programme entrant
- CO = College Accelerator Programme entrant
- NG = Next Gen Accelerator Program entrant
- w/o = Walkover
- r = Retired
- d = Defaulted

=== Finals ===
Semifinals
(Germany) Julia Görges	6	6
Q	(Austria) Tamira Paszek	4	2
3	(Denmark) Caroline Wozniacki	2	6^{3}
5	(United States) Sloane Stephens	6	7^{7}

Final
(Germany) Julia Görges	5	2
5	(United States) Sloane Stephens	7	6

=== Top half ===
First round
1	(United States) V Williams	7^{7}	3	3
(Russia) D Kasatkina	6^{4}	6	6
(Colombia) M Duque Mariño	2	6	5
(Japan) N Hibino	6	2	7
(Czech Republic) L Hradecká	0	3
(Germany) J Görges	6	6
Q	(Netherlands) K Bertens	2	4
7	(Czech Republic) B Strýcová	6	6
4	(Russia) S Kuznetsova	6	1
(Germany) M Barthel	2	1^{r}
WC	(Italy) F Schiavone	6^{3}	6	3
Q	(Austria) T Paszek	7^{7}	4	6
Q	(Belgium) K Flipkens	3	6	6
(United States) B Mattek-Sands	6	4	3
(United States) I Falconi	5	6	6
6	(United States) C Vandeweghe	7	4	3

Second round
(Russia) D Kasatkina	5	6	5
(Japan) N Hibino	7	2	7
(Germany) J Görges	6	7^{9}
7	(Czech Republic) B Strýcová	4	6^{7}
4	(Russia) S Kuznetsova	2	3
Q	(Austria) T Paszek	6	6
Q	(Belgium) K Flipkens	6	4	6
(United States) I Falconi	1	6	2

Quarterfinals
(Japan) N Hibino	7^{7}	2	4
(Germany) J Görges	6^{3}	6	6
Q	(Austria) T Paszek	6	6^{3}	6
Q	(Belgium) K Flipkens	4	7^{7}	3

Semifinals
(Germany) J Görges	6	6
Q	(Austria) T Paszek	4	2

=== Bottom half ===
First round
8	(Belgium) A Van Uytvanck	6	2	4
(Romania) A Dulgheru	1	6	6
(Kazakhstan) Y Putintseva	6^{2}	6^{3}
WC	(New Zealand) M Erakovic	7^{7}	7^{7}
(Japan) M Doi	2	4
(United States) C McHale	6	6
(Montenegro) D Kovinić	4	4
3	(Denmark) C Wozniacki	6	6
5	(United States) S Stephens	6	6
(Slovenia) P Hercog	3	3
(Germany) C Witthöft	6	7^{7}
(Germany) T Maria	2	6^{3}
(Sweden) J Larsson	1	5
WC	(Latvia) J Ostapenko	6	7
Q	(United Kingdom) N Broady	7	6
2	(Serbia) A Ivanovic	5	4

Second round
(Romania) A Dulgheru	7^{7}	6
WC	(New Zealand) M Erakovic	6^{4}	3
(United States) C McHale	0	2
3	(Denmark) C Wozniacki	6	6
5	(United States) S Stephens	3	6	6
(Germany) C Witthöft	6	1	3
WC	(Latvia) J Ostapenko	6	6^{4}	5
Q	(United Kingdom) N Broady	4	7^{7}	7

Quarterfinals
(Romania) A Dulgheru	1	0
3	(Denmark) C Wozniacki	6	6
5	(United States) S Stephens	7^{8}	6
Q	(United Kingdom) N Broady	6^{6}	3

Semifinals
3	(Denmark) C Wozniacki	2	6^{3}
5	(United States) S Stephens	6	7^{7}

== Qualifying ==
=== Seeds ===
1. (Slovakia) Magdaléna Rybáriková (qualifying competition)
2. (Japan) Kurumi Nara (qualifying competition)
3. (Belgium) Kirsten Flipkens (qualified)
4. (United States) Lauren Davis (qualifying competition)
5. (Puerto Rico) Monica Puig (second round)
6. (Germany) Laura Siegemund (first round)
7. (United States) Anna Tatishvili (first round)
8. (Netherlands) Kiki Bertens (qualified)

=== Qualifiers ===
1. (United Kingdom) Naomi Broady
2. (Austria) Tamira Paszek
3. (Belgium) Kirsten Flipkens
4. (Netherlands) Kiki Bertens

=== Qualifying draw ===
==== First qualifier ====
First round
1	(Slovakia) Magdaléna Rybáriková	6	7
(Chinese Taipei) Chang Kai-chen	4	5
(Belgium) Elise Mertens	6	6
(United States) Katerina Stewart	2	1
(Spain) Sílvia Soler Espinosa	0	7^{11}	4
(Ukraine) Kateryna Kozlova	6	6^{9}	6
(United Kingdom) Naomi Broady	6	6
6	(Germany) Laura Siegemund	1	3

Second round
1	(Slovakia) Magdaléna Rybáriková	6	6
(Belgium) Elise Mertens	4	2
(Ukraine) Kateryna Kozlova	2	4
(United Kingdom) Naomi Broady	6	6

Qualifying competition
1	(Slovakia) Magdaléna Rybáriková	3	6	6^{6}
(United Kingdom) Naomi Broady	6	1	7^{8}

==== Second qualifier ====
First round
2	(Japan) Kurumi Nara	6	6
WC	(Slovakia) Tereza Mihalíková	3	2
(Czech Republic) Andrea Hlaváčková	6	6
WC	(New Zealand) Joanna Carswell	0	4
(Luxembourg) Mandy Minella	3	3
(Austria) Tamira Paszek	6	6
(Japan) Misa Eguchi	4	4
5	(Puerto Rico) Monica Puig	6	6

Second round
2	(Japan) Kurumi Nara	6	3	6
(Czech Republic) Andrea Hlaváčková	3	6	3
(Austria) Tamira Paszek	7^{7}	6
5	(Puerto Rico) Monica Puig	6^{2}	3

Qualifying competition
2	(Japan) Kurumi Nara	6^{7}	1
(Austria) Tamira Paszek	7^{9}	6

==== Third qualifier ====
First round
3	(Belgium) Kirsten Flipkens	3	6	6
(Poland) Paula Kania	6	2	2
(Croatia) Petra Martić	0	1
(Israel) Julia Glushko	6	6
(China) Zhu Lin	7^{7}	1	2
(Turkey) İpek Soylu	6^{5}	6	6
(Czech Republic) Tereza Martincová	6	6
7	(United States) Anna Tatishvili	3	2

Second round
3	(Belgium) Kirsten Flipkens	7^{7}	6
(Israel) Julia Glushko	6^{3}	0
(Turkey) İpek Soylu	4	3
(Czech Republic) Tereza Martincová	6	6

Qualifying competition
3	(Belgium) Kirsten Flipkens	6	6
(Czech Republic) Tereza Martincová	4	3

==== Fourth qualifier ====
First round
4	(United States) Lauren Davis	4	6	6
WC	(New Zealand) Jade Lewis	6	1	4
(United States) Sachia Vickery	6	7
(Belgium) An-Sophie Mestach	0	5
(Netherlands) Richèl Hogenkamp	7^{7}	2	6
WC	(New Zealand) Rosie Cheng	6^{5}	6	2
(Sweden) Rebecca Peterson	4	4
8	(Netherlands) Kiki Bertens	6	6

Second round
4	(United States) Lauren Davis	7	6
(United States) Sachia Vickery	5	2
(Netherlands) Richèl Hogenkamp	3	2
8	(Netherlands) Kiki Bertens	6	6

Qualifying competition
4	(United States) Lauren Davis	4	2
8	(Netherlands) Kiki Bertens	6	6
