= 2016 ASB Classic – Women's doubles =

Women's doubles
- 2016 ASB Classic

Final
- Champions: (Belgium) Elise Mertens (Belgium) An-Sophie Mestach
- Runners-up: (Montenegro) Danka Kovinić (Czech Republic) Barbora Strýcová
- Score: 2–6, 6–3, [10–5]

Details
- Draw: 16
- Seeds: 4

Events
| Singles | men | women |
| Doubles | men | women |
| ← 2015 · | WTA Auckland Open | · 2017 → |

Sara Errani and Roberta Vinci were the defending champions, but chose not to participate this year.
Elise Mertens and An-Sophie Mestach won the title, defeating Danka Kovinić and Barbora Strýcová in the final, 2–6, 6–3, [10–5].

== Seeds ==
1. (Czech Republic) Andrea Hlaváčková / (Czech Republic) Lucie Hradecká (first round)
2. (Germany) Julia Görges / (Slovenia) Katarina Srebotnik (quarterfinals)
3. (Germany) Anna-Lena Grönefeld / (United States) Coco Vandeweghe (quarterfinals)
4. (Poland) Klaudia Jans-Ignacik / (Poland) Paula Kania (first round)

== Draw ==
=== Key ===
- Q = Qualifier
- WC = Wild card
- LL = Lucky loser
- Alt = Alternate
- SE = Special exempt
- PR = Protected ranking
- ITF = ITF entry
- JE = Junior exempt
- w/o = Walkover
- r = Retired
- d = Defaulted
- SR = Special ranking

First round
1 | (Czech Republic) A Hlaváčková (Czech Republic) L Hradecká | 6 | 4 | [3]
WC | (Belgium) K Flipkens (Serbia) A Ivanovic | 4 | 6 | [10]
(Croatia) P Martić (Luxembourg) M Minella | 6 | 3 | [6]
(Belgium) E Mertens (Belgium) A-S Mestach | 4 | 6 | [10]
4 | (Poland) K Jans-Ignacik (Poland) P Kania | 4 | 6 | [4]
(Argentina) M Irigoyen (Czech Republic) B Krejčíková | 6 | 4 | [10]
(United Kingdom) J Rae (United Kingdom) A Smith | 3 | 3
(Ukraine) L Kichenok (Ukraine) N Kichenok | 6 | 6
(Montenegro) D Kovinić (Czech Republic) B Strýcová | 7^{7} | 6
(Germany) T Maria (Germany) L Siegemund | 6^{4} | 2
(Sweden) J Larsson (Belgium) A Van Uytvanck | 5 | 1
3 | (Germany) A-L Grönefeld (United States) C Vandeweghe | 7 | 6
(New Zealand) M Erakovic (Spain) S Soler Espinosa | 6 | 7^{7}
WC | (New Zealand) R Cheng (Australia) S Jones | 2 | 6^{1}
(Croatia) D Jurak (United States) N Melichar | 6 | 4 | [12]
2 | (Germany) J Görges (Slovenia) K Srebotnik | 4 | 6 | [14]

Quarterfinals
WC | (Belgium) K Flipkens (Serbia) A Ivanovic
(Belgium) E Mertens (Belgium) A-S Mestach | w/o
(Argentina) M Irigoyen (Czech Republic) B Krejčíková | 7 | 6
(Ukraine) L Kichenok (Ukraine) N Kichenok | 5 | 3
(Montenegro) D Kovinić (Czech Republic) B Strýcová | 7^{7} | 3 | [10]
3 | (Germany) A-L Grönefeld (United States) C Vandeweghe | 6^{5} | 6 | [6]
(New Zealand) M Erakovic (Spain) S Soler Espinosa | 6 | 4 | [10]
2 | (Germany) J Görges (Slovenia) K Srebotnik | 4 | 6 | [7]

Semifinals
(Belgium) E Mertens (Belgium) A-S Mestach | 6 | 7^{8}
(Argentina) M Irigoyen (Czech Republic) B Krejčíková | 3 | 6^{6}
(Montenegro) D Kovinić (Czech Republic) B Strýcová | 6 | 6
(New Zealand) M Erakovic (Spain) S Soler Espinosa | 4 | 4

Final
(Belgium) E Mertens (Belgium) A-S Mestach | 2 | 6 | [10]
(Montenegro) D Kovinić (Czech Republic) B Strýcová | 6 | 3 | [5]
