= 2015 ASB Classic – Doubles =

Doubles
- 2015 ASB Classic

Final
- Champions: (Italy) Sara Errani (Italy) Roberta Vinci
- Runners-up: (Japan) Shuko Aoyama (Czech Republic) Renata Voráčová
- Score: 6–2, 6–1

Details
- Draw: 16
- Seeds: 4

Events
Singles	Doubles
← 2014 ·	WTA Auckland Open	· 2016 →

Sharon Fichman and Maria Sanchez are the defending champions, but they lost in the first round to Shuko Aoyama and Renata Voráčová.
Sara Errani and Roberta Vinci won the title, defeating Aoyama and Voráčová in the final, 6–2, 6–1.

== Seeds ==
1. (Italy) Sara Errani / (Italy) Roberta Vinci (champions)
2. (Czech Republic) Andrea Hlaváčková / (Czech Republic) Lucie Hradecká (semifinals)
3. (Germany) Julia Görges / (Germany) Anna-Lena Grönefeld (semifinals)
4. (Japan) Shuko Aoyama / (Czech Republic) Renata Voráčová (final)

== Draw ==
=== Key ===
- Q = Qualifier
- WC = Wild card
- LL = Lucky loser
- Alt = Alternate
- SE = Special exempt
- PR = Protected ranking
- ITF = ITF entry
- JE = Junior exempt
- w/o = Walkover
- r = Retired
- d = Defaulted
- SR = Special ranking

First round
1	(Italy) S Errani (Italy) R Vinci	2	6	[10]
(Ukraine) Y Beygelzimer (Czech Republic) E Hrdinová	6	2	[1]
(Canada) G Dabrowski (Poland) A Rosolska	4	6	[9]
(United States) N Melichar (Germany) L Siegemund	6	4	[11]
3	(Germany) J Görges (Germany) A-L Grönefeld	7^{7}	4	[10]
(Ukraine) K Bondarenko (Ukraine) O Savchuk	6^{3}	6	[5]
(Croatia) P Martić (United States) A Tatishvili	6	6
WC	(New Zealand) R Cheng (New Zealand) K Westbury	0	2
(Germany) M Barthel (Luxembourg) M Minella	3	7^{7}	[5]
(Croatia) D Jurak (United States) M Moulton-Levy	6	6^{3}	[10]
(Canada) S Fichman (United States) M Sanchez	6^{4}	2
4	(Japan) S Aoyama (Czech Republic) R Voráčová	7^{7}	6
WC	(New Zealand) M Erakovic (Puerto Rico) M Puig	6	6^{5}	[11]
(Argentina) M Irigoyen (Czech Republic) B Krejčíková	4	7^{7}	[9]
(Slovakia) D Hantuchová (Italy) F Schiavone	4	4
2	(Czech Republic) A Hlaváčková (Czech Republic) L Hradecká	6	6

Quarterfinals
1	(Italy) S Errani (Italy) R Vinci	3	7^{7}	[10]
(United States) N Melichar (Germany) L Siegemund	6	6^{3}	[5]
3	(Germany) J Görges (Germany) A-L Grönefeld	7	6
(Croatia) P Martić (United States) A Tatishvili	5	4
(Croatia) D Jurak (United States) M Moulton-Levy	3	2
4	(Japan) S Aoyama (Czech Republic) R Voráčová	6	6
WC	(New Zealand) M Erakovic (Puerto Rico) M Puig	6^{4}	6	[5]
2	(Czech Republic) A Hlaváčková (Czech Republic) L Hradecká	7^{7}	3	[10]

Semifinals
1	(Italy) S Errani (Italy) R Vinci	6	6
3	(Germany) J Görges (Germany) A-L Grönefeld	3	4
4	(Japan) S Aoyama (Czech Republic) R Voráčová	6	6
2	(Czech Republic) A Hlaváčková (Czech Republic) L Hradecká	3	3

Final
1	(Italy) S Errani (Italy) R Vinci	6	6
4	(Japan) S Aoyama (Czech Republic) R Voráčová	2	1
