= 2017 ASB Classic – Women's singles =

Women's singles
- 2017 ASB Classic

Final
- Champion: (United States) Lauren Davis
- Runner-up: (Croatia) Ana Konjuh
- Score: 6–3, 6–1

Details
- Draw: 32 (4 Q / 3 WC )
- Seeds: 8

Events
Singles	men	women
Doubles	men	women
← 2016 ·	ASB Classic	· 2018 →

Sloane Stephens was the defending champion, but withdrew before the tournament began.

Lauren Davis won her first WTA title, defeating Ana Konjuh in the final, 6–3, 6–1.

== Seeds ==
1. (United States) Serena Williams (second round)
2. (United States) Venus Williams (second round, withdrew due to right arm injury)
3. (Denmark) Caroline Wozniacki (quarterfinals)
4. (Czech Republic) Barbora Strýcová (quarterfinals)
5. (Netherlands) Kiki Bertens (first round)
6. (Russia) Anastasia Pavlyuchenkova (first round)
7. (Latvia) Jeļena Ostapenko (semifinals, retired)
8. (Croatia) Ana Konjuh (final)

== Draw ==
=== Finals ===
Semifinals
7	(Latvia) Jeļena Ostapenko	6	4	1^{r}
(United States) Lauren Davis	4	6	4
(Germany) Julia Görges	3	6	3
8	(Croatia) Ana Konjuh	6	4	6

Final
(United States) Lauren Davis	6	6
8	(Croatia) Ana Konjuh	3	1

=== Top half ===
First round
1	(United States) S Williams	6	6
(France) P Parmentier	3	4
Q	(United States) J Loeb	4	6^{5}
(United States) M Brengle	6	7^{7}
Q	(Germany) M Barthel	3	6	3
(Croatia) M Lučić-Baroni	6	3	6
WC	(New Zealand) M Erakovic	1	2
7	(Latvia) J Ostapenko	6	6
4	(Czech Republic) B Strýcová	6	6
Q	(Czech Republic) B Štefková	4	3
(Czech Republic) L Šafářová	6	6
(Czech Republic) D Allertová	1	2
(Japan) K Nara	6	6
WC	(Germany) A Lottner	2	2
(United States) L Davis	7^{7}	6
5	(Netherlands) K Bertens	6^{3}	4

Second round
1	(United States) S Williams	4	7^{7}	4
(United States) M Brengle	6	6^{3}	6
(Croatia) M Lučić-Baroni	2	6^{3}
7	(Latvia) J Ostapenko	6	7^{7}
4	(Czech Republic) B Strýcová	7	3	7^{7}
(Czech Republic) L Šafářová	5	6	6^{4}
(Japan) K Nara	3	3
(United States) L Davis	6	6

Quarterfinals
(United States) M Brengle	5	3
7	(Latvia) J Ostapenko	7	6
4	(Czech Republic) B Strýcová	1	6^{4}
(United States) L Davis	6	7^{7}

Semifinals
7	(Latvia) J Ostapenko	6	4	1^{r}
(United States) L Davis	4	6	4

=== Bottom half ===
First round
6	(Russia) A Pavlyuchenkova	3	4
(Germany) J Görges	6	6
(United Kingdom) N Broady	7^{7}	6
(Montenegro) D Kovinić	6^{5}	3
Q	(Australia) Ar Rodionova	3	4
(United States) V Lepchenko	6	6
(United States) N Gibbs	1	0
3	(Denmark) C Wozniacki	6	6
8	(Croatia) A Konjuh	6	3	6
(Belgium) K Flipkens	4	6	3
(Belgium) Y Wickmayer	6	6
(Sweden) J Larsson	1	2
(Germany) A Beck	2	4
(Japan) N Osaka	6	6
WC	(New Zealand) J Lewis	6^{2}	2
2	(United States) V Williams	7^{7}	6

Second round
(Germany) J Görges	7	6
(United Kingdom) N Broady	5	4
(United States) V Lepchenko	3	3
3	(Denmark) C Wozniacki	6	6
8	(Croatia) A Konjuh	6	6
(Belgium) Y Wickmayer	1	2
(Japan) N Osaka	w/o
2	(United States) V Williams

Quarterfinals
(Germany) J Görges	1	6	6
3	(Denmark) C Wozniacki	6	3	4
8	(Croatia) A Konjuh	3
(Japan) N Osaka	0^{r}

Semifinals
(Germany) J Görges	3	6	3
8	(Croatia) A Konjuh	6	4	6

== Qualifying ==
=== Seeds ===
1. (Japan) Nao Hibino (qualifying competition)
2. (Poland) Magda Linette (first round)
3. (Luxembourg) Mandy Minella (second round)
4. (Germany) Tatjana Maria (first round)
5. (Spain) Sílvia Soler Espinosa (second round)
6. (United States) Taylor Townsend (qualifying competition)
7. (Russia) Elizaveta Kulichkova (second round)
8. (Slovenia) Dalila Jakupović (qualifying competition)

=== Qualifiers ===
1. (Australia) Arina Rodionova
2. (Germany) Mona Barthel
3. (Czech Republic) Barbora Štefková
4. (United States) Jamie Loeb

=== Qualifying draw ===
==== First qualifier ====
First round
1	(Japan) Nao Hibino	6	6
(Japan) Makoto Ninomiya	2	2
(United States) Jacqueline Cako	0	4
(Turkey) İpek Soylu	6	6
WC	(New Zealand) Paige Mary Hourigan	2	2
(Australia) Arina Rodionova	6	6
(Japan) Miyu Kato	1	2
7	(Russia) Elizaveta Kulichkova	6	6

Second round
1	(Japan) Nao Hibino	6^{4}	6	6
(Turkey) İpek Soylu	7^{7}	4	1
(Australia) Arina Rodionova	7^{7}	4	6
7	(Russia) Elizaveta Kulichkova	6^{4}	6	2

Qualifying competition
1	(Japan) Nao Hibino	3	7^{7}	4
(Australia) Arina Rodionova	6	6^{3}	6

==== Second qualifier ====
First round
2	(Poland) Magda Linette	2	6	4
(Germany) Mona Barthel	6	4	6
WC	(New Zealand) Joanna Carswell	6	4	6
WC	(New Zealand) Claudia Williams	3	6	2
(Japan) Shuko Aoyama	5	6	6
(France) Virginie Razzano	7	3	0
WC	(Canada) Erin Routliffe	3	7^{7}	3
8	(Slovenia) Dalila Jakupović	6	6^{4}	6

Second round
(Germany) Mona Barthel	6	6
WC	(New Zealand) Joanna Carswell	1	1
(Japan) Shuko Aoyama	4	2
8	(Slovenia) Dalila Jakupović	6	6

Qualifying competition
(Germany) Mona Barthel	6	6
8	(Slovenia) Dalila Jakupović	2	1

==== Third qualifier ====
First round
3	(Luxembourg) Mandy Minella	6	1
(Canada) Françoise Abanda	4	0^{r}
(Czech Republic) Barbora Štefková	6	6
(Brazil) Paula Cristina Gonçalves	1	3
(Czech Republic) Tereza Martincová	6	5	7^{10}
(United Kingdom) Laura Robson	3	7	6^{8}
(Argentina) Catalina Pella	3	4
5	(Spain) Sílvia Soler Espinosa	6	6

Second round
3	(Luxembourg) Mandy Minella	3	6	3
(Czech Republic) Barbora Štefková	6	3	6
(Czech Republic) Tereza Martincová	2	6	6
5	(Spain) Sílvia Soler Espinosa	6	1	2

Qualifying competition
(Czech Republic) Barbora Štefková	6	6
(Czech Republic) Tereza Martincová	1	3

==== Fourth qualifier ====
First round
4	(Germany) Tatjana Maria	4	5
(United States) Jamie Loeb	6	7
(Israel) Julia Glushko	2	1
(China) Yang Zhaoxuan	6	6
(Hungary) Dalma Gálfi	4	6	4
(Russia) Anna Blinkova	6	1	6
(Canada) Gabriela Dabrowski	6^{5}	6^{5}
6	(United States) Taylor Townsend	7^{7}	7^{7}

Second round
(United States) Jamie Loeb	6	6
(China) Yang Zhaoxuan	2	2
(Russia) Anna Blinkova	2	6	3
6	(United States) Taylor Townsend	6	4	6

Qualifying competition
(United States) Jamie Loeb	7^{7}	6
6	(United States) Taylor Townsend	6^{3}	1
