= 2015 ASB Classic – Singles =

Singles
- 2015 ASB Classic

Final
- Champion: (United States) Venus Williams
- Runner-up: (Denmark) Caroline Wozniacki
- Score: 2–6, 6–3, 6–3

Details
- Draw: 32 (4 Q / 1 WC )
- Seeds: 8

Events
Singles	Doubles
← 2014 ·	ASB Classic	· 2016 →

Ana Ivanovic was the defending champion, but she chose to participate at the Brisbane International instead.

Venus Williams made her second straight ASB Classic final and won the title, defeating Caroline Wozniacki 2–6, 6–3, 6–3.

== Seeds ==
1. (Denmark) Caroline Wozniacki (final)
2. (Italy) Sara Errani (first round)
3. (United States) Venus Williams (champion)
4. (Czech Republic) Barbora Záhlavová-Strýcová (semifinals)
5. (Russia) Svetlana Kuznetsova (first round)
6. (United States) Sloane Stephens (second round)
7. (United States) Coco Vandeweghe (quarterfinals)
8. (Germany) Mona Barthel (first round)

== Draw ==
=== Finals ===
Semifinals
1	(Denmark) Caroline Wozniacki	4	6	6
4	(Czech Republic) Barbora Záhlavová-Strýcová	6	3	4
3	(United States) Venus Williams	6	6
(United States) Lauren Davis	0	3

Final
1	(Denmark) Caroline Wozniacki	6	3	3
3	(United States) Venus Williams	2	6	6

=== Top half ===
First round
1	(Denmark) C Wozniacki	6	6
Q	(Israel) J Glushko	3	2
(Belgium) Y Wickmayer	5	6	0
WC	(United States) T Townsend	7	3	6
(Germany) J Görges	6	6
Q	(United States) A Tatishvili	1	4
Q	(Czech Republic) L Hradecká	3	7^{8}	6
5	(Russia) S Kuznetsova	6	6^{6}	4
4	(Czech Republic) B Záhlavová-Strýcová	6	3	6
(South Africa) C Scheepers	1	6	2
(Puerto Rico) M Puig	5	6	4
(New Zealand) M Erakovic	7	2	6
(Belgium) K Flipkens	7^{7}	1	7^{7}
(Sweden) J Larsson	6^{1}	6	6^{3}
(Italy) R Vinci	7	2	3
7	(United States) C Vandeweghe	5	6	6

Second round
1	(Denmark) C Wozniacki	6	7^{7}
WC	(United States) T Townsend	1	6^{4}
(Germany) J Görges	6	7
Q	(Czech Republic) L Hradecká	3	5
4	(Czech Republic) B Záhlavová-Strýcová	6	2	6
(New Zealand) M Erakovic	0	6	4
(Belgium) K Flipkens	1	7^{7}	5
7	(United States) C Vandeweghe	6	6^{5}	7

Quarterfinals
1	(Denmark) C Wozniacki	6	6
(Germany) J Görges	4	4
4	(Czech Republic) B Záhlavová-Strýcová	6	7
7	(United States) C Vandeweghe	4	5

Semifinals
1	(Denmark) C Wozniacki	4	6	6
4	(Czech Republic) B Záhlavová-Strýcová	6	3	4

=== Bottom half ===
First round
8	(Germany) M Barthel	2	1
(Croatia) A Konjuh	6	6
(Russia) E Vesnina	7^{7}	6
(France) K Mladenovic	6^{5}	2
(Netherlands) K Bertens	3	2
(Japan) K Nara	6	6
(Slovakia) J Čepelová	1	0
3	(United States) V Williams	6	6
6	(United States) S Stephens	6	6
(Spain) S Soler Espinosa	3	1
(United States) S Rogers	6	4	3
(United States) L Davis	1	6	6
Q	(Poland) U Radwańska	6	7
(Italy) F Schiavone	4	5
(Slovakia) D Hantuchová	6	6
2	(Italy) S Errani	3	2

Second round
(Croatia) A Konjuh	3	1
(Russia) E Vesnina	6	6
(Japan) K Nara	4	1
3	(United States) V Williams	6	6
6	(United States) S Stephens	6	4	1
(United States) L Davis	1	6	6
Q	(Poland) U Radwańska	1	6	6
(Slovakia) D Hantuchová	6	3	1

Quarterfinals
(Russia) E Vesnina	2	4
3	(United States) V Williams	6	6
(United States) L Davis	2	6	6
Q	(Poland) U Radwańska	6	2	1

Semifinals
3	(United States) V Williams	6	6
(United States) L Davis	0	3

== Qualifying ==
=== Seeds ===
1. (United States) Nicole Gibbs (first round)
2. (Belgium) An-Sophie Mestach (second round)
3. (United States) Grace Min (first round)
4. (Belgium) Alison Van Uytvanck (second round)
5. (Kazakhstan) Yulia Putintseva (first round)
6. (Canada) Sharon Fichman (second round)
7. (Japan) Misa Eguchi (qualifying competition)
8. (Germany) Laura Siegemund (second round)

=== Qualifiers ===
1. (Poland) Urszula Radwańska
2. (United States) Anna Tatishvili
3. (Israel) Julia Glushko
4. (Czech Republic) Lucie Hradecká

=== Qualifying draw ===
==== First qualifier ====
First round
1	(United States) Nicole Gibbs	2	6	2
(Ukraine) Yuliya Beygelzimer	6	4	6
(Japan) Shuko Aoyama	3	3
(Bulgaria) Sesil Karatantcheva	6	6
(Estonia) Anett Kontaveit	5	6	2
(Poland) Urszula Radwańska	7	3	6
WC	(New Zealand) Jade Lewis	2	0
8	(Germany) Laura Siegemund	6	6

Second round
(Ukraine) Yuliya Beygelzimer	2	6	5
(Bulgaria) Sesil Karatantcheva	6	3	7
(Poland) Urszula Radwańska	6	6
8	(Germany) Laura Siegemund	1	3

Qualifying competition
(Bulgaria) Sesil Karatantcheva	2	4
(Poland) Urszula Radwańska	6	6

==== Second qualifier ====
First round
2	(Belgium) An-Sophie Mestach	6	6
WC	(Australia) Sacha Jones	3	0
(United States) Louisa Chirico	4	3
(United States) Anna Tatishvili	6	6
(Luxembourg) Mandy Minella	3	6	7
(Czech Republic) Barbora Krejčíková	6	3	5
(Czech Republic) Andrea Hlaváčková	3	6	3
6	(Canada) Sharon Fichman	6	3	6

Second round
2	(Belgium) An-Sophie Mestach	7^{7}	0	2
(United States) Anna Tatishvili	6^{3}	6	6
(Luxembourg) Mandy Minella	7^{7}	6
6	(Canada) Sharon Fichman	6^{3}	3

Qualifying competition
(United States) Anna Tatishvili	4	6	6
(Luxembourg) Mandy Minella	6	0	0

==== Third qualifier ====
First round
3	(United States) Grace Min	1	2
(Croatia) Petra Martić	6	6
(Tunisia) Ons Jabeur	3	3
(France) Claire Feuerstein	6	6
(United Kingdom) Naomi Broady	1	4
(Ukraine) Kateryna Kozlova	6	6
(Israel) Julia Glushko	6	6
5	(Kazakhstan) Yulia Putintseva	1	3

Second round
(Croatia) Petra Martić	6^{1}	6	4
(France) Claire Feuerstein	7^{7}	2	6
(Ukraine) Kateryna Kozlova	3	4
(Israel) Julia Glushko	6	6

Qualifying competition
(France) Claire Feuerstein	1^{r}
(Israel) Julia Glushko	4

==== Fourth qualifier ====
First round
4	(Belgium) Alison Van Uytvanck	7^{9}	7^{8}
(Czech Republic) Renata Voráčová	6^{7}	6^{6}
WC	(New Zealand) Katherine Westbury	7^{7}	2	2
(Czech Republic) Lucie Hradecká	6^{5}	6	6
PR	(United States) Alexa Glatch	6	6
(Argentina) María Irigoyen	2	3
WC	(New Zealand) Rosie Cheng	5	4
7	(Japan) Misa Eguchi	7	6

Second round
4	(Belgium) Alison Van Uytvanck	6	3	5
(Czech Republic) Lucie Hradecká	2	6	7
PR	(United States) Alexa Glatch	6	5	4
7	(Japan) Misa Eguchi	3	7	6

Qualifying competition
(Czech Republic) Lucie Hradecká	6	1	7^{7}
7	(Japan) Misa Eguchi	3	6	6^{4}
