= 2015 ASB Classic =

Women's tennis tournament

- Date: 5–10 January
- Edition: 30th
- Category: WTA International
- Draw: 32S / 16D
- Prize money: $250,000
- Surface: Hard
- Location: Auckland, New Zealand
- Venue: ASB Tennis Centre

Champions

Singles
- (United States) Venus Williams

Doubles
- (Italy) Sara Errani / (Italy) Roberta Vinci
| ← 2014 · | WTA Auckland Open | · 2016 → |

The 2015 ASB Classic was a women's tennis tournament played on outdoor hard courts. It was the 30th edition of the ASB Classic, and part of the WTA International tournaments category of the 2015 WTA Tour. It took place at the ASB Tennis Centre in Auckland, New Zealand, from 5 January until 10 January 2015. Third-seeded Venus Williams won the singles title.

== Finals ==
=== Singles ===
- (United States) Venus Williams defeated (Denmark) Caroline Wozniacki, 2–6, 6–3, 6–3

=== Doubles ===
- (Italy) Sara Errani / (Italy) Roberta Vinci defeated (Japan) Shuko Aoyama / (Czech Republic) Renata Voráčová, 6–2, 6–1

== Points and prize money ==
=== Point distribution ===
| Event | W | F | SF | QF | Round of 16 | Round of 32 | Q | Q3 | Q2 | Q1 |
| Singles | 280 | 180 | 110 | 60 | 30 | 1 | 18 | 14 | 10 | 1 |
| Doubles | 280 | 180 | 110 | 60 | 1 | — | — | — | — | — |

=== Prize money ===
| Event | W | F | SF | QF | Round of 16 | Round of 32^{1} | Q3 | Q2 | Q1 |
| Singles | $43,000 | $21,400 | $11,300 | $5,900 | $3,310 | $1,925 | $1,005 | $730 | $530 |
| Doubles * | $12,300 | $6,400 | $3,435 | $1,820 | $960 | — | — | — | — |

_{^{1} Qualifiers' prize money is also the Round of 32 prize money}
_{* per team}

== Singles entrants ==
=== Seeds ===
| Country | Player | Rank^{1} | Seed |
|---|---|---|---|
| DEN | Caroline Wozniacki | 8 | 1 |
| ITA | Sara Errani | 14 | 2 |
| USA | Venus Williams | 19 | 3 |
| RUS | Svetlana Kuznetsova | 25 | 4 |
| CZE | Barbora Záhlavová-Strýcová | 26 | 5 |
| USA | Sloane Stephens | 35 | 6 |
| USA | Coco Vandeweghe | 38 | 7 |
| GER | Mona Barthel | 41 | 8 |

- ^{1} Rankings as of 5 January 2015.

=== Other entrants ===
The following players received wildcards into the singles main draw:

- (United States) Taylor Townsend

The following players received entry from the qualifying draw:

- (Israel) Julia Glushko
- (Czech Republic) Lucie Hradecká
- (Poland) Urszula Radwańska
- (United States) Anna Tatishvili

== Doubles entrants ==
=== Seeds ===
| Country | Player | Country | Player | Rank^{1} | Seed |
|---|---|---|---|---|---|
| ITA | Sara Errani | ITA | Roberta Vinci | 2 | 1 |
| CZE | Andrea Hlaváčková | CZE | Lucie Hradecká | 37 | 2 |
| GER | Julia Görges | GER | Anna-Lena Grönefeld | 76 | 3 |
| JPN | Shuko Aoyama | CZE | Renata Voráčová | 108 | 4 |

- ^{1} Rankings as of 29 December 2014

=== Other entrants ===
The following pairs received wildcards into the doubles main draw:

- (New Zealand) Rosie Cheng / (New Zealand) Katherine Westbury
- (New Zealand) Marina Erakovic / (Puerto Rico) Monica Puig

== See also ==
- 2015 Heineken Open – men's tournament
