= 2017 Serena Williams tennis season =

- Full name: Serena Jameka Williams
- Country: United States
- Calendar prize money: $2,704,680

Singles
- Season record: 8–1
- Calendar titles: 1
- Current ranking: No. 22
- Ranking change from previous year: ▼20

Grand Slam & significant results
- Australian Open: W
- French Open: A
- Wimbledon: A
- US Open: A

Doubles
- Current ranking: NR

Grand Slam doubles results
- Australian Open: A
- French Open: A
- Wimbledon: A
- US Open: A
- Last updated on: 29 January 2017.

The 2017 Serena Williams tennis season officially began on 5 January with the start of the 2017 ASB Classic. Williams entered the season as the number two ranked player.

On January 28, 2017, Williams set a record for the most slams in the Open Era when she claimed her 23rd slam at the 2017 Australian Open. On April 19, she announced that she was pregnant with her first child and would not participate in any further tournaments for the rest of the year.

== Singles matches ==
Tournament	Match	Round	Opponent	Rank	Result	Score
Auckland Open; Auckland, New Zealand; WTA International; Hard; 2–8 January 2017	905	1R	(France) Pauline Parmentier	#69	Win	6–3, 6–4
Auckland Open; Auckland, New Zealand; WTA International; Hard; 2–8 January 2017	906	2R	(United States) Madison Brengle	#72	Loss	4–6, 7–6^{(7–3)}, 4–6
Australian Open; Melbourne, Australia; Grand Slam; Hard, outdoor 16–29 January 2017	907	1R	(Switzerland) Belinda Bencic	#59	Win	6–4, 6–3
Australian Open; Melbourne, Australia; Grand Slam; Hard, outdoor 16–29 January 2017	908	2R	(Czech Republic) Lucie Šafářová	#61	Win	6–3, 6–4
Australian Open; Melbourne, Australia; Grand Slam; Hard, outdoor 16–29 January 2017	909	3R	(United States) Nicole Gibbs	#92	Win	6–1, 6–3
Australian Open; Melbourne, Australia; Grand Slam; Hard, outdoor 16–29 January 2017	910	4R	(Czech Republic) Barbora Strýcová	#16	Win	7–5, 6–4
Australian Open; Melbourne, Australia; Grand Slam; Hard, outdoor 16–29 January 2017	911	QF	(United Kingdom) Johanna Konta	#9	Win	6–2, 6–3
Australian Open; Melbourne, Australia; Grand Slam; Hard, outdoor 16–29 January 2017	912	SF	(Croatia) Mirjana Lučić-Baroni	#79	Win	6–2, 6–1
Australian Open; Melbourne, Australia; Grand Slam; Hard, outdoor 16–29 January 2017	913	F	(United States) Venus Williams	#17	Win(1)	6–4, 6–4

== Tournament schedule ==
=== Singles schedule ===
Williams' 2017 singles tournament schedule is as follows:

Date	Championship	Location	Category	Surface	2016 result	2016 points	2017 points	Outcome
2 January – 8 January	Auckland Open	(New Zealand) Auckland	WTA International	Hard	N/A	0	30	Second round lost to (United States) Madison Brengle, 4–6, 7-6^{(7-3)}, 4–6
16 January – 29 January	Australian Open	(Australia) Melbourne	Grand Slam	Hard	F	1300	2000	Winner defeated (United States) Venus Williams, 6–4, 6–4
Total year-end points						7050	2030	

== Yearly records ==
=== Head-to-head matchups ===
Ordered by percentage of wins

- (Switzerland) Belinda Bencic 1–0
- (United States) Nicole Gibbs 1–0
- (United Kingdom) Johanna Konta 1–0
- (Croatia) Mirjana Lučić-Baroni 1–0
- (France) Pauline Parmentier 1–0
- (Czech Republic) Lucie Šafářová 1–0
- (Czech Republic) Barbora Strýcová 1–0
- (United States) Venus Williams 1–0
- (United States) Madison Brengle 0–1

=== Finals ===
==== Singles ====
Legend Grand Slams (1–0) WTA Tour Championships (0–0) WTA Premier Mandatory (0–0) WTA Premier 5 (0–0) WTA Premier (0–0) WTA International (0–0)	Finals by surface Hard (1-0) Clay (0–0) Grass (0–0)	Finals by venue Outdoors (1–0) Indoors (0–0)

Outcome	No.	Date	Championship	Surface	Opponent in the final	Score in the final
Winner	72.	January 28, 2017	Australian Open, Melbourne, Australia	Hard	(United States) Venus Williams	6–4, 6–4

=== Earnings ===
#	Event	Prize money	Year-to-date
1	Auckland Open	$3,310	$3,310
2	Australian Open	A$3,700,000	$2,704,680
			$2,707,990

== See also ==
- 2017 WTA Tour
- Serena Williams career statistics

Sporting positions
Preceded by Venus Williams; Angelique Kerber	World No. 1 First stint: July 8, 2002 – August 10, 2003; Last stint: April 24, 2017 – May 14, 2017	Succeeded by Kim Clijsters; Angelique Kerber
Preceded by Jennifer Capriati; Justine Henin; Petra Kvitová	Year-end World No. 1; 2002; 2008, 2009; 2012 – 2015	Succeeded by Justine Henin; Kim Clijsters; Angelique Kerber
Awards
Preceded by Jennifer Capriati; Jelena Janković; Petra Kvitová	ITF Women's Singles World Champion; 2002; 2009; 2012 – 2015	Succeeded by Justine Henin; Caroline Wozniacki; Angelique Kerber
Preceded by Martina Hingis & Anna Kournikova; Cara Black & Liezel Huber	WTA Doubles Team of the Year; 2000 (with Venus Williams); 2009 (with Venus Williams)	Succeeded by Lisa Raymond & Rennae Stubbs; Gisela Dulko & Flavia Pennetta
Preceded by Cara Black & Liezel Huber	ITF Women's Doubles World Champion; 2009 (with Venus Williams)	Succeeded by Gisela Dulko & Flavia Pennetta
