= 2016 ASB Classic – Men's doubles =

Men's doubles
- 2016 ASB Classic

Final
- Champions: (Croatia) Mate Pavić (New Zealand) Michael Venus
- Runners-up: (United States) Eric Butorac (United States) Scott Lipsky
- Score: 7–5, 6–4

Details
- Draw: 16
- Seeds: 4

Events
Singles	men	women
Doubles	men	women
← 2015 ·	ATP Auckland Open	· 2017 →

Raven Klaasen and Leander Paes were the defending champions, but Klaasen chose not to compete this year and Paes chose to participate in Sydney instead.

Mate Pavić and Michael Venus won the title, defeating Eric Butorac and Scott Lipsky in the final, 7–5, 6–4.

== Seeds ==
1. (Colombia) Juan Sebastián Cabal / (Colombia) Robert Farah (first round)
2. (Philippines) Treat Huey / (Belarus) Max Mirnyi (first round)
3. (Germany) Philipp Petzschner / (Austria) Alexander Peya (quarterfinals)
4. (United States) Eric Butorac / (United States) Scott Lipsky (final)

== Draw ==
=== Key ===
- Q = Qualifier
- WC = Wild card
- LL = Lucky loser
- Alt = Alternate
- SE = Special exempt
- PR = Protected ranking
- ITF = ITF entry
- JE = Junior exempt
- w/o = Walkover
- r = Retired
- d = Defaulted
- SR = Special ranking

=== Draw ===
First round
1	(Colombia) JS Cabal (Colombia) R Farah	2	6^{6}
WC	(New Zealand) M Daniell (New Zealand) A Sitak	6	7^{8}
(Spain) P Andújar (Italy) F Fognini	3	4
(United States) S Johnson (United States) S Querrey	6	6
3	(Germany) P Petzschner (Austria) A Peya	7^{7}	6
(Spain) G García-López (Spain) D Marrero	6^{3}	3
(Australia) C Guccione (Brazil) A Sá	4	2
(Croatia) M Pavić (New Zealand) M Venus	6	6
WC	(New Zealand) F Tearney (New Zealand) W Whitehouse	5	2
(United States) N Monroe (United States) D Young	7	6
(United Kingdom) J Marray (Pakistan) A-u-H Qureshi	4	6	[11]
4	(United States) E Butorac (United States) S Lipsky	6	3	[13]
Alt	(Dominican Republic) V Estrella Burgos (Spain) A Ramos-Viñolas	6^{6}	4
(Austria) J Knowle (Austria) O Marach	7^{8}	6
(United States) J Isner (Czech Republic) L Rosol	4	6	[10]
2	(Philippines) T Huey (Belarus) M Mirnyi	6	3	[5]

Quarterfinals
WC	(New Zealand) M Daniell (New Zealand) A Sitak	w/o
(United States) S Johnson (United States) S Querrey
3	(Germany) P Petzschner (Austria) A Peya	3	4
(Croatia) M Pavić (New Zealand) M Venus	6	6
(United States) N Monroe (United States) D Young	2	6	[5]
4	(United States) E Butorac (United States) S Lipsky	6	4	[10]
(Austria) J Knowle (Austria) O Marach	w/o
(United States) J Isner (Czech Republic) L Rosol

Semifinals
WC	(New Zealand) M Daniell (New Zealand) A Sitak	2	3
(Croatia) M Pavić (New Zealand) M Venus	6	6
4	(United States) E Butorac (United States) S Lipsky	6	6
(Austria) J Knowle (Austria) O Marach	1	4

Final
(Croatia) M Pavić (New Zealand) M Venus	7	6
4	(United States) E Butorac (United States) S Lipsky	5	4
