= 2016 ASB Classic – Men's singles =

Men's singles
- 2016 ASB Classic

Final
- Champion: (Spain) Roberto Bautista Agut
- Runner-up: (United States) Jack Sock
- Score: 6–1, 1–0, ret.

Details
- Draw: 28 (4 Q / 2 WC )
- Seeds: 8

Events
Singles	men	women
Doubles	men	women
← 2015 ·	ATP Auckland Open	· 2017 →

Jiří Veselý was the defending champion, but lost in the first round to Roberto Bautista Agut.
Bautista Agut went on to win the title, defeating Jack Sock in the final, 6–1, 1–0, ret.

== Seeds ==
The top four seeds received a bye into the second round.

1. (Spain) David Ferrer (semifinals)
2. (France) Jo-Wilfried Tsonga (semifinals)
3. (United States) John Isner (quarterfinals)
4. (South Africa) Kevin Anderson (quarterfinals)
5. (France) Benoît Paire (second round)
6. (Italy) Fabio Fognini (quarterfinals)
7. (Croatia) Ivo Karlović (first round)
8. (Spain) Roberto Bautista Agut (champion)

== Draw ==
=== Key ===
- Q = Qualifier
- WC = Wild card
- LL = Lucky loser
- Alt = Alternate
- SE = Special exempt
- PR = Protected ranking
- ITF = ITF entry
- JE = Junior exempt
- w/o = Walkover
- r = Retired
- d = Defaulted
- SR = Special ranking

=== Finals ===
Semifinals
1/WC	(Spain) David Ferrer	6	1	2
(United States) Jack Sock	3	6	6
8	(Spain) Roberto Bautista Agut	3	7^{7}	6
2	(France) Jo-Wilfried Tsonga	6	6^{3}	4

Final
(United States) Jack Sock	1	0^{r}
8	(Spain) Roberto Bautista Agut	6	1

=== Top half ===
First round
(United States) S Johnson	3	6	3
Q	(Australia) M Barton	6	3	6
(Czech Republic) L Rosol	7^{7}	6
(Spain) G García López	6^{5}	4
WC	(New Zealand) M Venus	4	6^{4}
5	(France) B Paire	6	7^{7}
Q	(Netherlands) R Haase	6	6
(Spain) P Andújar	4	1
(Dominican Republic) V Estrella Burgos	0	4
(United States) J Sock	6	6
(Canada) V Pospisil	7^{7}	7
7	(Croatia) I Karlović	6^{4}	5

Second round
1/WC	(Spain) D Ferrer	6	6
Q	(Australia) M Barton	2	4
(Czech Republic) L Rosol	6	7^{7}
5	(France) B Paire	4	6^{5}
4	(South Africa) K Anderson	7^{10}	7^{7}
Q	(Netherlands) R Haase	6^{8}	6^{5}
(United States) J Sock	6	6
(Canada) V Pospisil	2	4

Quarterfinals
1/WC	(Spain) D Ferrer	6	6
(Czech Republic) L Rosol	3	4
4	(South Africa) K Anderson	6	4	4
(United States) J Sock	1	6	6

Semifinals
1/WC	(Spain) D Ferrer	6	1	2
(United States) J Sock	3	6	6

=== Bottom half ===
First round
8	(Spain) R Bautista Agut	6	7
(Czech Republic) J Veselý	3	5
(United States) D Young	6	6
WC	(New Zealand) F Tearney	2	3
(United Kingdom) A Bedene	7^{7}	6^{10}	1^{r}
(United States) S Querrey	6^{5}	7^{12}	2
6	(Italy) F Fognini	6	2	7^{7}
(Portugal) J Sousa	4	6	6^{3}
Q	(Netherlands) T de Bakker	6	6
(Spain) A Ramos Viñolas	3	4
(Germany) P Kohlschreiber	7^{10}	6
Q	(Germany) B Becker	6^{8}	3

Second round
8	(Spain) R Bautista Agut	6	7^{7}
(United States) D Young	4	6^{3}
(United States) S Querrey	6^{8}	7^{7}	4
3	(United States) J Isner	7^{10}	6^{4}	6
6	(Italy) F Fognini	6	6
Q	(Netherlands) T de Bakker	1	1
(Germany) P Kohlschreiber	3	4
2	(France) J-W Tsonga	6	6

Quarterfinals
8	(Spain) R Bautista Agut	7	2	6
3	(United States) J Isner	5	6	3
6	(Italy) F Fognini	5	6^{4}
2	(France) J-W Tsonga	7	7^{7}

Semifinals
8	(Spain) R Bautista Agut	3	7^{7}	6
2	(France) J-W Tsonga	6	6^{3}	4

== Qualifying ==
=== Seeds ===
1. (Netherlands) Robin Haase (qualified)
2. (United States) Denis Kudla (qualifying competition)
3. (Germany) Benjamin Becker (qualified)
4. (Netherlands) Thiemo de Bakker (qualified)
5. (South Korea) Lee Duck-hee (qualifying competition)
6. (Australia) Matthew Barton (qualified)
7. (Croatia) Mate Pavić (qualifying competition)
8. (United Kingdom) Cameron Norrie (qualifying competition)

=== Qualifiers ===
1. (Netherlands) Robin Haase
2. (Australia) Matthew Barton
3. (Germany) Benjamin Becker
4. (Netherlands) Thiemo de Bakker

=== Qualifying draw ===
==== First qualifier ====
First round
1	(Netherlands) Robin Haase	6	7
Alt	(United States) Eric Butorac	4	5
Alt	(Colombia) Robert Farah	1	2
5	(South Korea) Lee Duck-hee	6	6

Qualifying competition
1	(Netherlands) Robin Haase	6	6
5	(South Korea) Lee Duck-hee	1	3

==== Second qualifier ====
First round
2	(United States) Denis Kudla	6	6
Alt	(Philippines) Treat Huey	4	2
WC	(New Zealand) Artem Sitak	6^{8}	0
6	(Australia) Matthew Barton	7^{10}	6

Qualifying competition
2	(United States) Denis Kudla	2	0
6	(Australia) Matthew Barton	6	6

==== Third qualifier ====
First round
3	(Germany) Benjamin Becker	6	6
Alt	(United States) Scott Lipsky	3	1
(South Korea) Woo Chung-hyo	1	2
8/WC	(United Kingdom) Cameron Norrie	6	6

Qualifying competition
3	(Germany) Benjamin Becker	6	6
8/WC	(United Kingdom) Cameron Norrie	1	2

==== Fourth qualifier ====
First round
4	(Netherlands) Thiemo de Bakker	6	6
(Australia) Greg Jones	2	2
Alt	(Colombia) Juan Sebastián Cabal	2	4
7	(Croatia) Mate Pavić	6	6

Qualifying competition
4	(Netherlands) Thiemo de Bakker	4	6	6
7	(Croatia) Mate Pavić	6	2	3
