= 2017 ASB Classic – Men's singles =

Men's singles
- 2017 ASB Classic

Final
- Champion: (United States) Jack Sock
- Runner-up: (Portugal) João Sousa
- Score: 6–3, 5–7, 6–3

Details
- Draw: 28 (4 Q / 3 WC )
- Seeds: 8

Events
Singles	men	women
Doubles	men	women
← 2016 ·	ATP Auckland Open	· 2018 →

Roberto Bautista Agut was the defending champion, but withdrew due to a stomach virus.

Jack Sock won the title, defeating João Sousa in the final, 6–3, 5–7, 6–3.

== Seeds ==
The top four seeds received a bye into the second round.

1. (Spain) Roberto Bautista Agut (withdrew due to a stomach virus)
2. (United States) John Isner (quarterfinals)
3. (Spain) David Ferrer (second round)
4. (United States) Jack Sock (champion)
5. (Spain) Albert Ramos Viñolas (first round)
6. (Spain) Feliciano López (second round, withdrew)
7. (United States) Steve Johnson (semifinals)
8. (Cyprus) Marcos Baghdatis (semifinals)

== Draw ==
=== Key ===
- Q = Qualifier
- WC = Wild card
- LL = Lucky loser
- Alt = Alternate
- SE = Special exempt
- PR = Protected ranking
- ITF = ITF entry
- JE = Junior exempt
- w/o = Walkover
- r = Retired
- d = Defaulted
- SR = Special ranking

=== Finals ===
Semifinals
8	(Cyprus) Marcos Baghdatis	1	5
(Portugal) João Sousa	6	7
4	(United States) Jack Sock	6	6
7	(United States) Steve Johnson	4	3

Final
(Portugal) João Sousa	3	7	3
4	(United States) Jack Sock	6	5	6

=== Top half ===
First round
(Argentina) H Zeballos	4	3
(Czech Republic) J Veselý	6	6
Q	(United States) M Mmoh	6^{4}	6	4
WC	(Germany) D Brown	7^{7}	3	6
(France) A Mannarino	4	4
8	(Cyprus) M Baghdatis	6	6
Q	(New Zealand) F Tearney	4	5
(Netherlands) R Haase	6	7
(Argentina) F Bagnis	1	7^{8}	6^{3}
Q	(United Kingdom) B Klein	6	6^{6}	7^{7}
(Portugal) J Sousa	6	7
5	(Spain) A Ramos Viñolas	1	5

Second round
LL	(New Zealand) J Statham	7^{8}	5	3
(Czech Republic) J Veselý	6^{6}	7	6
WC	(Germany) D Brown	6	6^{4}	4
8	(Cyprus) M Baghdatis	4	7^{7}	6
3	(Spain) D Ferrer	6	4	6^{4}
(Netherlands) R Haase	2	6	7^{7}
Q	(United Kingdom) B Klein	3	4
(Portugal) J Sousa	6	6

Quarterfinals
(Czech Republic) J Veselý	2	4
8	(Cyprus) M Baghdatis	6	6
(Netherlands) R Haase	3	2
(Portugal) J Sousa	6	6

Semifinals
8	(Cyprus) M Baghdatis	1	5
(Portugal) J Sousa	6	7

=== Bottom half ===
First round
6	(Spain) F López	3	6	6
WC	(New Zealand) M Venus	6	4	3
WC	(New Zealand) A Sitak	4	2
(France) J Chardy	6	6
Q	(United States) R Harrison	6	6
(Spain) G García López	1	2
7	(United States) S Johnson	6	6
(France) S Robert	4	3
(Chinese Taipei) Y-h Lu	4	7^{7}	7^{11}
(Russia) K Khachanov	6	6^{5}	6^{9}
(Tunisia) M Jaziri	7^{7}	6
(Argentina) D Schwartzman	6^{1}	3

Second round
6	(Spain) F López
(France) J Chardy	w/o
Q	(United States) R Harrison	6^{5}	6	1
4	(United States) J Sock	7^{7}	4	6
7	(United States) S Johnson	6	7^{7}
(Chinese Taipei) Y-h Lu	4	6^{4}
(Tunisia) M Jaziri	3	6	6^{6}
2	(United States) J Isner	6	3	7^{8}

Quarterfinals
(France) J Chardy	7	4	3
4	(United States) J Sock	5	6	6
7	(United States) S Johnson	6	5	7^{7}
2	(United States) J Isner	3	7	6^{3}

Semifinals
4	(United States) J Sock	6	6
7	(United States) S Johnson	4	3

== Qualifying ==
=== Seeds ===
1. (United States) Ryan Harrison (qualified)
2. (Canada) Steven Diez (qualifying competition)
3. (United States) Michael Mmoh (qualified)
4. (United Kingdom) Cameron Norrie (qualifying competition)
5. (Poland) Jerzy Janowicz (qualifying competition)
6. (United Kingdom) Brydan Klein (qualified)
7. (New Zealand) Jose Statham (qualifying competition, lucky loser)
8. (New Zealand) Finn Tearney (qualified)

=== Qualifiers ===
1. (United States) Ryan Harrison
2. (United Kingdom) Brydan Klein
3. (United States) Michael Mmoh
4. (New Zealand) Finn Tearney

=== Lucky loser ===
1. (New Zealand) Jose Statham

=== Qualifying draw ===
==== First qualifier ====
First round
1	(United States) Ryan Harrison	6	6
Alt	(Poland) Marcin Matkowski	4	4
Alt	(United Kingdom) Rhett Purcell	6^{2}	0
7/WC	(New Zealand) Jose Statham	7^{7}	6

Qualifying competition
1	(United States) Ryan Harrison	6	6
7/WC	(New Zealand) Jose Statham	4	1

==== Second qualifier ====
First round
2	(Canada) Steven Diez	7	6
Alt	(Philippines) Treat Huey	5	2
(Japan) Masato Shiga	4	2
6	(United Kingdom) Brydan Klein	6	6

Qualifying competition
2	(Canada) Steven Diez	6	4	4
6	(United Kingdom) Brydan Klein	3	6	6

==== Third qualifier ====
First round
3	(United States) Michael Mmoh	6	6
(Australia) Greg Jones	1	1
Alt	(Latvia) Krišjānis Stabiņš	4	4
5	(Poland) Jerzy Janowicz	6	6

Qualifying competition
3	(United States) Michael Mmoh	7^{7}	6
5	(Poland) Jerzy Janowicz	6^{3}	3

==== Fourth qualifier ====
First round
4	(United Kingdom) Cameron Norrie	6	6
(Brazil) Marcelo Demoliner	4	2
Alt	(Pakistan) Aisam-ul-Haq Qureshi	6	5	0^{r}
8/WC	(New Zealand) Finn Tearney	4	7	0

Qualifying competition
4	(United Kingdom) Cameron Norrie	1	3
8/WC	(New Zealand) Finn Tearney	6	6
