= 2017 ASB Classic – Women's doubles =

Women's doubles
- 2017 ASB Classic

Final
- Champions: (Netherlands) Kiki Bertens (Sweden) Johanna Larsson
- Runners-up: (Netherlands) Demi Schuurs (Czech Republic) Renata Voráčová
- Score: 6–2, 6–2

Details
- Draw: 16
- Seeds: 4

Events
Singles	men	women
Doubles	men	women
- WTA Auckland Open

Elise Mertens and An-Sophie Mestach were the defending champions, but Mestach chose not to participate this year and Mertens chose to compete in Brisbane instead.

Kiki Bertens and Johanna Larsson won the title, defeating Demi Schuurs and Renata Voráčová in the final, 6–2, 6–2.

== Seeds ==
1. (Czech Republic) Lucie Šafářová / (Czech Republic) Barbora Strýcová (quarterfinals, withdrew)
2. (Chinese Taipei) Chan Hao-ching / (Chinese Taipei) Chan Yung-jan (first round)
3. (Netherlands) Kiki Bertens / (Sweden) Johanna Larsson (champions)
4. (Canada) Gabriela Dabrowski / (China) Yang Zhaoxuan (semifinals)

== Draw ==
Key

- Q = Qualifier
- WC = Wild card
- LL = Lucky loser
- Alt = Alternate
- ITF = ITF entry
- PR = Protected ranking
- SR = Special ranking
- SE = Special exempt
- JE = Junior exempt
- JR = Junior Accelerator Programme entrant
- CO = College Accelerator Programme entrant
- NG = Next Gen Accelerator Program entrant
- w/o = Walkover
- r = Retired
- d = Defaulted

First round
1	(Czech Republic) L Šafářová (Czech Republic) B Strýcová	w/o
(Germany) A Beck (Germany) J Görges
(Germany) T Maria (United States) N Melichar	6	4	[7]
(Netherlands) D Schuurs (Czech Republic) R Voráčová	4	6	[10]
4	(Canada) G Dabrowski (China) Z Yang	7	6
(United Kingdom) J Rae (United Kingdom) A Smith	5	2
(Argentina) M Irigoyen (Turkey) İ Soylu	6	7^{7}
(Japan) M Kato (Australia) Ar Rodionova	2	6^{2}
(Poland) A Rosolska (United States) T Townsend	1	5
WC	(New Zealand) M Erakovic (United Kingdom) L Robson	6	7
(Russia) A Pavlyuchenkova (Belgium) Y Wickmayer	6^{5}	3
3	(Netherlands) K Bertens (Sweden) J Larsson	7^{7}	6
WC	(New Zealand) J Lewis (Canada) E Routliffe	4	3
(Japan) S Aoyama (Japan) M Ninomiya	6	6
(Belgium) K Flipkens (Latvia) J Ostapenko	7	3	[10]
2	(Chinese Taipei) H-c Chan (Chinese Taipei) Y-j Chan	5	6	[5]

Quarterfinals
1	(Czech Republic) L Šafářová (Czech Republic) B Strýcová
(Netherlands) D Schuurs (Czech Republic) R Voráčová	w/o
4	(Canada) G Dabrowski (China) Z Yang	6	6
(Argentina) M Irigoyen (Turkey) İ Soylu	2	3
WC	(New Zealand) M Erakovic (United Kingdom) L Robson	3	4
3	(Netherlands) K Bertens (Sweden) J Larsson	6	6
(Japan) S Aoyama (Japan) M Ninomiya	2	6	[7]
(Belgium) K Flipkens (Latvia) J Ostapenko	6	1	[10]

Semifinals
(Netherlands) D Schuurs (Czech Republic) R Voráčová	7	6
4	(Canada) G Dabrowski (China) Z Yang	5	2
3	(Netherlands) K Bertens (Sweden) J Larsson	w/o
(Belgium) K Flipkens (Latvia) J Ostapenko

Final
(Netherlands) D Schuurs (Czech Republic) R Voráčová	2	2
3	(Netherlands) K Bertens (Sweden) J Larsson	6	6
