= 2016 ASB Classic =

Coordinates: 36.853742°S 174.773507°E

- Date: 4–9 January (women); 11–16 January (men)
- Edition: 31st (women); 40th (men)
- Category: WTA International; ATP 250
- Draw: 32S / 16D (women); 28S / 16D (men)
- Prize money: $250,000 (women) $ (men)
- Surface: Hard
- Location: Auckland, New Zealand
- Venue: ASB Tennis Centre

Champions

Men's singles
- (Spain) Roberto Bautista Agut

Women's singles
- (United States) Sloane Stephens

Men's doubles
- (Croatia) Mate Pavić / (New Zealand) Michael Venus

Women's doubles
- (Belgium) Elise Mertens / (Belgium) An-Sophie Mestach
- ASB Classic

The 2016 Auckland Open, also known by its sponsored name ASB Classic, was a joint 2016 ATP World Tour and 2016 WTA Tour tennis tournament. Played on outdoor hard courts, it was the 31st edition of the women's event, and the 40th edition of the men's event. It took place at the ASB Tennis Centre in Auckland, New Zealand, from 4 to 9 January 2016 for the women, and from 11 to 16 January 2016 for the men.

== Finals ==
=== Men's singles ===
- (Spain) Roberto Bautista Agut defeated (United States) Jack Sock, 6–1, 1–0, ret.

=== Women's singles ===
- (United States) Sloane Stephens defeated (Germany) Julia Görges, 7–5, 6–2

=== Men's doubles ===
- (Croatia) Mate Pavić / (New Zealand) Michael Venus defeated (United States) Eric Butorac / (United States) Scott Lipsky, 7–5, 6–4

=== Women's doubles ===
- (Belgium) Elise Mertens / (Belgium) An-Sophie Mestach defeated (Montenegro) Danka Kovinić / (Czech Republic) Barbora Strýcová, 2–6, 6–3, [10–5]

== Points and prize money ==
=== Point distribution ===
Event	W	F	SF	QF	Round of 16	Round of 32	Q	Q3	Q2	Q1
Men's singles	250	150	90	45	20	0	12	6	0	—N/a
Men's doubles	250	150	90	45	0	—N/a	—N/a	—N/a	—N/a	—N/a
Women's singles	280	180	110	60	30	1	18	14	10	1
Women's doubles	280	180	110	60	1	—N/a	—N/a	—N/a	—N/a	—N/a

=== Prize money ===
Event	W	F	SF	QF	Round of 16	Round of 32^{1}	Q3	Q2	Q1
Men's singles	$83,450	$43,430	$23,525	$13,400	$7,900	$4,680	$2,105	$1,055	—N/a
Men's doubles *	$25,070	$13,170	$7,140	$4,080	$2,390	—N/a	—N/a	—N/a	—N/a
Women's singles	$43,000	$21,400	$11,300	$5,900	$3,310	$1,925	$1,005	$730	$530
Women's doubles *	$12,300	$6,400	$3,435	$1,820	$960	—N/a	—N/a	—N/a	—N/a

_{^{1} Qualifiers' prize money is also the Round of 32 prize money}
_{* per team}

== ATP singles main-draw entrants ==
=== Seeds ===
Country	Player	Rank^{1}	Seed
ESP	David Ferrer	7	1
FRA	Jo-Wilfried Tsonga	10	2
USA	John Isner	11	3
RSA	Kevin Anderson	12	4
FRA	Benoît Paire	19	5
ITA	Fabio Fognini	21	6
CRO	Ivo Karlović	23	7
ESP	Roberto Bautista Agut	25	8

- ^{1} Rankings as of 4 January 2016

=== Other entrants ===
The following players received wildcards into the singles main draw:

- (Spain) David Ferrer
- (New Zealand) Finn Tearney
- (New Zealand) Michael Venus

The following players received entry from the qualifying draw:

- (Australia) Matthew Barton
- (Germany) Benjamin Becker
- (Netherlands) Thiemo de Bakker
- (Netherlands) Robin Haase

=== Retirements ===
- (United Kingdom) Aljaž Bedene (leg injury)
- (United States) Jack Sock (illness)

== ATP doubles main-draw entrants ==
=== Seeds ===
Country	Player	Country	Player	Rank^{1}	Seed
COL	Juan Sebastián Cabal	COL	Robert Farah	52	1
PHI	Treat Huey	BLR	Max Mirnyi	61	2
GER	Philipp Petzschner	AUT	Alexander Peya	74	3
USA	Eric Butorac	USA	Scott Lipsky	85	4

- ^{1} Rankings as of 4 January 2016

=== Other entrants ===
The following pairs received wildcards into the doubles main draw:

- (New Zealand) Marcus Daniell / (New Zealand) Artem Sitak
- (New Zealand) Finn Tearney / (New Zealand) Wesley Whitehouse

The following pair received entry as alternates:

- (Dominican Republic) Víctor Estrella Burgos / (Spain) Albert Ramos Viñolas

=== Withdrawals ===
Before the tournament

- (United Kingdom) Aljaž Bedene (leg injury)

During the tournament

- (United States) John Isner (knee injury)
- (United States) Sam Querrey (tiredness & knee injury)

== WTA singles main-draw entrants ==
=== Seeds ===
Country	Player	Rank^{1}	Seed
USA	Venus Williams	7	1
SRB	Ana Ivanovic	16	2
DEN	Caroline Wozniacki	17	3
RUS	Svetlana Kuznetsova	25	4
USA	Sloane Stephens	30	5
USA	CoCo Vandeweghe	37	6
CZE	Barbora Strýcová	42	7
BEL	Alison Van Uytvanck	44	8

- ^{1} Rankings as of 28 December 2015.

=== Other entrants ===
The following players received wildcards into the singles main draw:

- (New Zealand) Marina Erakovic
- (Latvia) Jeļena Ostapenko
- (Italy) Francesca Schiavone

The following players received entry from the qualifying draw:

- (Netherlands) Kiki Bertens
- (United Kingdom) Naomi Broady
- (Belgium) Kirsten Flipkens
- (Austria) Tamira Paszek

=== Retirements ===
- (Germany) Mona Barthel (illness)

== WTA doubles main-draw entrants ==
=== Seeds ===
Country	Player	Country	Player	Rank^{1}	Seed
CZE	Andrea Hlaváčková	CZE	Lucie Hradecká	37	1
GER	Julia Görges	SLO	Katarina Srebotnik	38	2
GER	Anna-Lena Grönefeld	USA	CoCo Vandeweghe	78	3
POL	Klaudia Jans-Ignacik	POL	Paula Kania	112	4

- ^{1} Rankings as of 28 December 2015.

=== Other entrants ===
The following pairs received wildcards into the doubles main draw:

- (New Zealand) Rosie Cheng / (Australia) Sacha Jones
- (Belgium) Kirsten Flipkens / (Serbia) Ana Ivanovic

=== Withdrawals ===
During the tournament

- (Serbia) Ana Ivanovic (dizziness)
