= 2017 ASB Classic – Men's doubles =

Men's doubles
- 2017 ASB Classic

Final
- Champions: (Poland) Marcin Matkowski (Pakistan) Aisam-ul-Haq Qureshi
- Runners-up: (Israel) Jonathan Erlich (United States) Scott Lipsky
- Score: 1–6, 6–2, [10–3]

Details
- Draw: 16
- Seeds: 4

Events
Singles	men	women
Doubles	men	women
← 2016 ·	ATP Auckland Open	· 2018 →

Mate Pavić and Michael Venus were the defending champions, but Pavić chose to compete in Sydney instead. Venus played alongside Robert Lindstedt, but lost in the first round to Nicholas Monroe and Artem Sitak.

Marcin Matkowski and Aisam-ul-Haq Qureshi won the title, defeating Jonathan Erlich and Scott Lipsky in the final, 1–6, 6–2, [10–3].

== Seeds ==
1. (Philippines) Treat Huey / (Belarus) Max Mirnyi (first round)
2. (United Kingdom) Dominic Inglot / (Romania) Florin Mergea (quarterfinals)
3. (Sweden) Robert Lindstedt / (New Zealand) Michael Venus (first round)
4. (Poland) Marcin Matkowski / (Pakistan) Aisam-ul-Haq Qureshi (champions)

== Draw ==
=== Key ===
- Q = Qualifier
- WC = Wild card
- LL = Lucky loser
- Alt = Alternate
- SE = Special exempt
- PR = Protected ranking
- ITF = ITF entry
- JE = Junior exempt
- w/o = Walkover
- r = Retired
- d = Defaulted
- SR = Special ranking

=== Draw ===
First round
1	(Philippines) T Huey (Belarus) M Mirnyi	6^{3}	3
(India) L Paes (Brazil) A Sá	7^{7}	6
WC	(New Zealand) M Daniell (Brazil) M Demoliner	6	6
(Argentina) G Durán (Portugal) J Sousa	4	4
4	(Poland) M Matkowski (Pakistan) A-u-H Qureshi	7^{7}	6
(United States) R Harrison (United States) J Isner	6^{4}	1
(Tunisia) M Jaziri (France) S Robert	6^{7}	4
(Mexico) S González (Spain) D Marrero	7^{9}	6
(Argentina) F Bagnis (Argentina) D Schwartzman	6	6^{5}	[10]
(Spain) A Ramos Viñolas (Czech Republic) J Veselý	3	7^{7}	[7]
(United States) N Monroe (New Zealand) A Sitak	6	3	[10]
3	(Sweden) R Lindstedt (New Zealand) M Venus	3	6	[8]
(Chile) J Peralta (Argentina) H Zeballos	3	4
(Israel) J Erlich (United States) S Lipsky	6	6
WC	(New Zealand) J Statham (New Zealand) F Tearney	5	5
2	(United Kingdom) D Inglot (Romania) F Mergea	7	7

Quarterfinals
(India) L Paes (Brazil) A Sá	3	6^{4}
WC	(New Zealand) M Daniell (Brazil) M Demoliner	6	7^{7}
4	(Poland) M Matkowski (Pakistan) A-u-H Qureshi	6	3	[11]
(Mexico) S González (Spain) D Marrero	4	6	[9]
(Argentina) F Bagnis (Argentina) D Schwartzman	6	6^{5}	[9]
(United States) N Monroe (New Zealand) A Sitak	3	7^{7}	[11]
(Israel) J Erlich (United States) S Lipsky	6	7^{8}
2	(United Kingdom) D Inglot (Romania) F Mergea	3	6^{6}

Semifinals
WC	(New Zealand) M Daniell (Brazil) M Demoliner	4	4
4	(Poland) M Matkowski (Pakistan) A-u-H Qureshi	6	6
(United States) N Monroe (New Zealand) A Sitak	4	4
(Israel) J Erlich (United States) S Lipsky	6	6

Final
4	(Poland) M Matkowski (Pakistan) A-u-H Qureshi	1	6	[10]
(Israel) J Erlich (United States) S Lipsky	6	2	[3]
