= 2017 ASB Classic =

Coordinates: 36.853742°S 174.773507°E

- Date: 2–7 January (women); 9–14 January (men)
- Edition: 32nd (women); 41st (men)
- Category: WTA International; ATP 250
- Draw: 32S / 16D (women); 28S / 16D (men)
- Prize money: $226,750 (women) $450,110 (men)
- Surface: Hard
- Location: Auckland, New Zealand
- Venue: ASB Tennis Centre

Champions

Men's singles
- (United States) Jack Sock

Women's singles
- (United States) Lauren Davis

Men's doubles
- (Poland) Marcin Matkowski / (Pakistan) Aisam-ul-Haq Qureshi

Women's doubles
- (Netherlands) Kiki Bertens / (Sweden) Johanna Larsson
- Auckland Open

The 2017 Auckland Open, also known by its sponsored name ASB Classic, was a joint 2017 ATP World Tour and 2017 WTA Tour tennis tournament, played on outdoor hard courts. It was the 32nd edition of the women's event, and the 41st edition of the men's event. It took place at the ASB Tennis Centre in Auckland, New Zealand, from 2 to 7 January 2017 for the women, and from 9 to 14 January 2017 for the men.

== Finals ==
=== Men's singles ===
- (United States) Jack Sock defeated (Portugal) João Sousa, 6–3, 5–7, 6–3

=== Women's singles ===
- (United States) Lauren Davis defeated (Croatia) Ana Konjuh, 6–3, 6–1

=== Men's doubles ===
- (Poland) Marcin Matkowski / (Pakistan) Aisam-ul-Haq Qureshi defeated (Israel) Jonathan Erlich / (United States) Scott Lipsky, 1–6, 6–2, [10–3]

=== Women's doubles ===
- (Netherlands) Kiki Bertens / (Sweden) Johanna Larsson defeated (Netherlands) Demi Schuurs / (Czech Republic) Renata Voráčová, 6–2, 6–2

== Points and prize money ==
=== Point distribution ===
Event	W	F	SF	QF	Round of 16	Round of 32	Q	Q3	Q2	Q1
Men's singles	250	150	90	45	20	0	12	6	0	—N/a
Men's doubles	250	150	90	45	0	—N/a	—N/a	—N/a	—N/a	—N/a
Women's singles	280	180	110	60	30	1	18	14	10	1
Women's doubles	280	180	110	60	1	—N/a	—N/a	—N/a	—N/a	—N/a

=== Prize money ===
Event	W	F	SF	QF	Round of 16	Round of 32^{1}	Q3	Q2	Q1
Men's singles	$80,250	$42,265	$22.895	$13,040	$7,685	$4,555	$2,050	$1,025	—N/a
Men's doubles *	$24,380	$12,820	$6,940	$3,970	$2,330	—N/a	—N/a	—N/a	—N/a
Women's singles	$43,000	$21,400	$11,300	$5,900	$3,310	$1,925	$1,005	$730	$530
Women's doubles *	$12,300	$6,400	$3,435	$1,820	$960	—N/a	—N/a	—N/a	—N/a

_{^{1} Qualifiers' prize money is also the Round of 32 prize money}
_{* per team}

== ATP singles main-draw entrants ==
=== Seeds ===
Country	Player	Rank^{1}	Seed
~~ESP~~	~~Roberto Bautista Agut~~	~~14~~	~~1~~
USA	John Isner	19	2
ESP	David Ferrer	21	3
USA	Jack Sock	23	4
ESP	Albert Ramos Viñolas	27	5
ESP	Feliciano López	28	6
USA	Steve Johnson	33	7
CYP	Marcos Baghdatis	36	8

- ^{1} Rankings as of 2 January 2017.

=== Other entrants ===
The following players received wildcards into the singles main draw:

- (Germany) Dustin Brown
- (New Zealand) Artem Sitak
- (New Zealand) Michael Venus

The following players received entry from the qualifying draw:

- (United States) Ryan Harrison
- (United Kingdom) Brydan Klein
- (United States) Michael Mmoh
- (New Zealand) Finn Tearney

The following player received entry as a lucky loser:

- (New Zealand) Jose Statham

=== Withdrawals ===
Before the tournament

- (Spain) Roberto Bautista Agut (stomach virus) → replaced by (New Zealand) Jose Statham
- (Spain) Tommy Robredo → replaced by (France) Jérémy Chardy
- (Argentina) Juan Martín del Potro → replaced by (Chinese Taipei) Lu Yen-hsun

== ATP doubles main-draw entrants ==
=== Seeds ===
Country	Player	Country	Player	Rank^{1}	Seed
PHI	Treat Huey	BLR	Max Mirnyi	43	1
GBR	Dominic Inglot	ROM	Florin Mergea	69	2
SWE	Robert Lindstedt	NZL	Michael Venus	71	3
POL	Marcin Matkowski	PAK	Aisam-ul-Haq Qureshi	76	4

- ^{1} Rankings as of 2 January 2017.

=== Other entrants ===
The following pairs received wildcards into the doubles main draw:

- (New Zealand) Marcus Daniell / (Brazil) Marcelo Demoliner
- (New Zealand) Jose Statham / (New Zealand) Finn Tearney

== WTA singles main-draw entrants ==
=== Seeds ===
Country	Player	Rank^{1}	Seed
USA	Serena Williams	2	1
USA	Venus Williams	17	2
DEN	Caroline Wozniacki	19	3
CZE	Barbora Strýcová	20	4
NED	Kiki Bertens	22	5
RUS	Anastasia Pavlyuchenkova	27	6
LAT	Jeļena Ostapenko	44	7
CRO	Ana Konjuh	47	8

- ^{1} Rankings as of 26 December 2016.

=== Other entrants ===
The following players received wildcards into the singles main draw:

- (New Zealand) Marina Erakovic
- (New Zealand) Jade Lewis
- (Germany) Antonia Lottner

The following players received entry from the qualifying draw:

- (Germany) Mona Barthel
- (United States) Jamie Loeb
- (Australia) Arina Rodionova
- (Czech Republic) Barbora Štefková

=== Withdrawals ===
Before the tournament

- (Serbia) Ana Ivanovic (retirement) → replaced by (United States) Varvara Lepchenko
- (United States) Sloane Stephens → replaced by (United Kingdom) Naomi Broady

== WTA doubles main-draw entrants ==
=== Seeds ===
Country	Player	Country	Player	Rank^{1}	Seed
CZE	Lucie Šafářová	CZE	Barbora Strýcová	24	1
TPE	Chan Hao-ching	TPE	Chan Yung-jan	24	2
NED	Kiki Bertens	SWE	Johanna Larsson	63	3
CAN	Gabriela Dabrowski	CHN	Yang Zhaoxuan	99	4

- ^{1} Rankings as of 26 December 2016.

=== Other entrants ===
The following pairs received wildcards into the doubles main draw:

- (New Zealand) Marina Erakovic / (United Kingdom) Laura Robson
- (New Zealand) Jade Lewis / (Canada) Erin Routliffe
