= ASB Classic =

The ASB Classic could refer to several tennis tournaments held in Auckland:

- The women's WTA Auckland Open
- The men's ATP Auckland Open
