= Marina Erakovic =

New Zealand tennis player

Marina Eraković
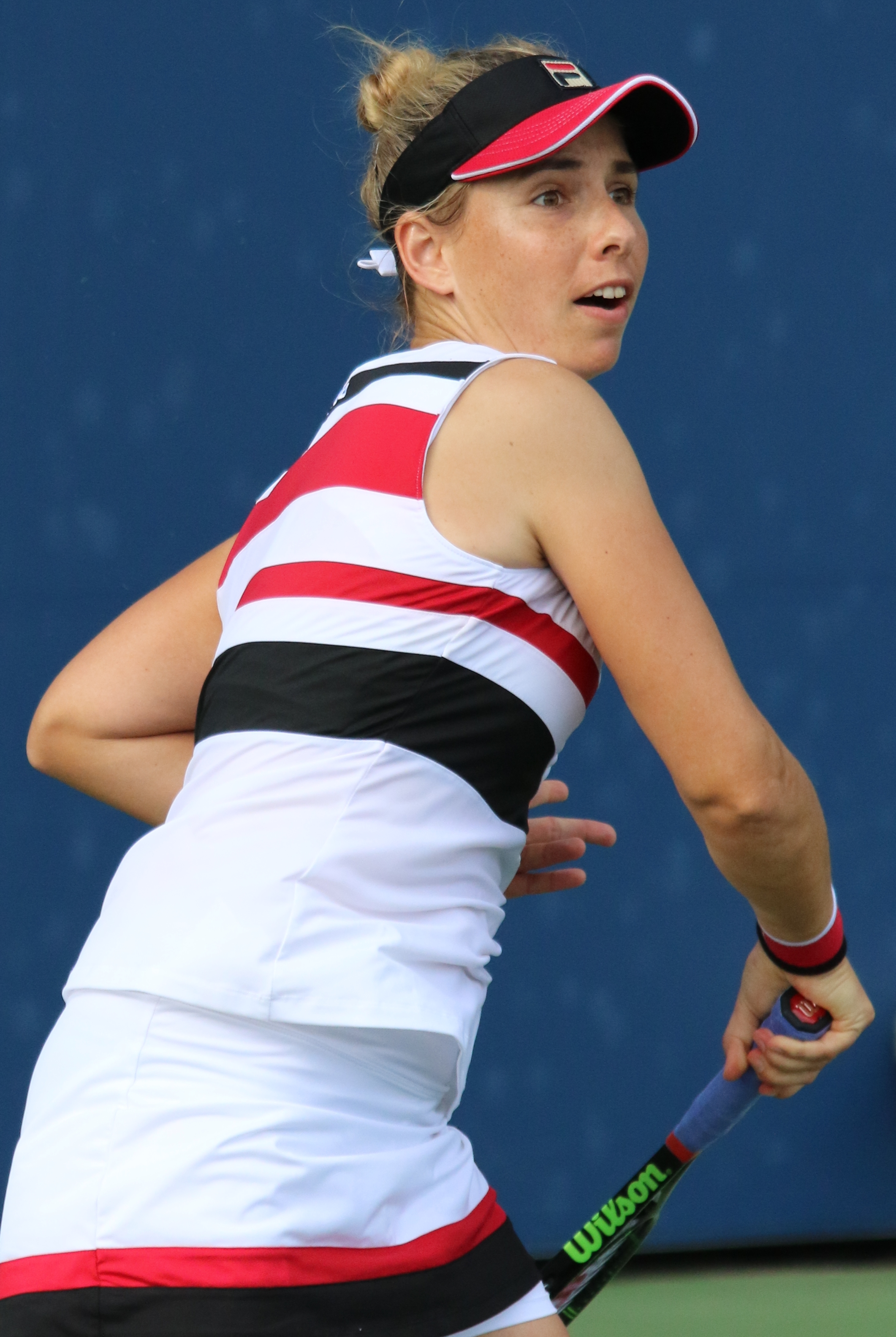
- Erakovic at the 2016 US Open
- Country (sports): New Zealand
- Residence: Auckland, New Zealand
- Born: 6 March 1988 (age 38) Split, SFR Yugoslavia (now Croatia)
- Height: 1.74 m (5 ft 9 in)
- Turned pro: 2005
- Retired: 11 December 2018
- Plays: Right-handed (two-handed backhand)
- Prize money: US$ 2,605,983

Singles
- Career record: 367–250
- Career titles: 1
- Highest ranking: No. 39 (7 May 2012)

Grand Slam singles results
- Australian Open: 2R (2009, 2012, 2014)
- French Open: 3R (2013)
- Wimbledon: 3R (2008, 2013, 2016)
- US Open: 2R (2014)

Doubles
- Career record: 185–143
- Career titles: 8
- Highest ranking: No. 25 (24 June 2013)

Grand Slam doubles results
- Australian Open: 1R (2009, 2010, 2011, 2012, 2013, 2014, 2015)
- French Open: QF (2013, 2014)
- Wimbledon: SF (2011)
- US Open: QF (2008)

Team competitions
- Fed Cup: 26–12 (singles 18-7)

Marina Erakovic (/məˈrɪnə ɪˈrækəvɪtʃ/ mə-RIN-ə ih-RAK-ə-vitch; Croatian: Marina Eraković [marǐːna erǎːkoʋitɕ]; born 6 March 1988) is a former tennis player from New Zealand. She achieved career-high rankings of 39 in singles and 25 in doubles, and won a singles title (at Memphis in February 2013) and eight doubles titles on the WTA Tour.

== Personal life ==
Born in Split, Croatia (then part of Yugoslavia), Erakovic emigrated with her family to Auckland, New Zealand, in 1994 at the age of six. She attended St Thomas's Primary School and Glendowie College in Auckland.

== Junior years ==
Erakovic and Monica Niculescu were the runners-up to Victoria Azarenka and Olga Govortsova in the 2004 Wimbledon girls' doubles, before Erakovic teamed with Michaëlla Krajicek to win the US Open title three months later, beating Niculescu and her Romanian teammate Mădălina Gojnea. Erakovic became the first player from New Zealand to win a Grand Slam title (singles or doubles) since James Greenhalgh and Steven Downs won the boys' doubles in 1993 at the French Open and Wimbledon. Erakovic then partnered Azarenka to an easy win in the 2005 Australian Open over Nikola Fraňková and Ágnes Szávay, and reunited with Niculescu to be runners-up at Wimbledon, defeated this time by Azarenka and Szávay.

== Professional ==
=== 2005–2007: New Zealand's No. 1 ===
In 2005 and 2006, Erakovic won five singles titles on the ITF Women's Circuit. She was a wildcard entrant at the 2005 Auckland Open and lost in the second round. She lost also in the second round of qualifying at the 2006 French Open.

In 2007, she lost in the second round of qualifying at the Australian Open, the first round of qualifying for the French Open, the first round of qualifying in Wimbledon, and the third round of qualifying at the US Open. She again received a wildcard entry for the Auckland Open and was defeated once again in the second round.

At the end of 2007, aged 19, Erakovic became New Zealand's number one, ranked No. 153 in the WTA rankings.

=== 2008–2009: Top 70; after injury out of the top 200 ===
In 2008, Erakovic made significant progress in her tennis career. At the Auckland Open, she reached the semifinals, marking the first time a New Zealander had advanced this far in the event since 1990. She also made her debut in the Grand Slam tournaments, reaching the second round at the Australian Open and the third round in Wimbledon, the latter being the first time for a New Zealand player since 1988. Erakovic's performance at Wimbledon helped her for a year-end ranking of world No. 66. Her season, however, was impacted by a hip injury, causing her to miss the French Open and withdraw from Wimbledon. By the end of the year, her ranking was outside the top 200.

=== 2010–2011: More setback; reborn – top 70 again ===
Erakovic competed in singles and doubles at the Auckland Open, losing in the first round in both draws. She then competed at the Australian Open, losing to eventual semifinalist Li Na in the first round. In doubles, she and partner Casey Dellacqua lost to 11th seeded Russian pair of Alla Kudryavtseva and Ekaterina Makarova, in the first round.

Erakovic's next tournament was the Pattaya Open where she again lost in the singles in the first round; however, she and partner Tamarine Tanasugarn won the doubles title, Erakovic's fourth.

She started the year with the Auckland Open where she again received a wildcard entry, and lost in the first round against Elena Vesnina. She then decided to compete on the ITF Circuit where she won three titles.

In the Australian Open, she defeated Irena Pavlovic in the first round of the qualifying draw, but then lost to Kurumi Nara.

Erakovic competed at the French Open where she won three straight matches in the qualifying draw against Ajla Tomljanović, Kurumi Nara and Petra Cetkovská. In the first round of the main draw, she lost to Arantxa Rus.

She made the qualification for Wimbledon, where she beat Chang Kai-chen in the first round, her first singles major match win since the Australian Open in 2009. However, she lost to Daniela Hantuchová in the second.

At Stanford, Erakovic recorded the biggest win of her singles career, defeating top-seed and then-world No. 4, Victoria Azarenka, in the second round to reach the quarterfinals.

In the US Open, she was defeated in the first round by Mirjana Lučić, after three rounds of qualification.

Erakovic advanced to her first WTA Tour final at the Challenge Bell in Quebec City. En route to the final, she defeated Caroline Garcia, Irina Falconi, top seed Daniela Hantuchová and defending champion Tamira Paszek. In the final, she lost to Barbora Záhlavová-Strýcová.

Her good results made her climb back to No. 61 in the rankings.

=== 2012: Top 40 & next injury ===
At the Australian Open, Erakovic beat Irena Pavlovic in the first round and lost to Christina McHale in the second, in three sets. In the doubles, she and her partner Chuang Chia-jung were eliminated in the first round.

In May at the Italian Open, Erakovic had another big wins in her singles career, defeating world No. 13, Sabine Lisicki, in the first round. Earlier, she had lost in the semifinals to Elena Vesnina at the Budapest Grand Prix in Hungary. This helped her recording a new career high of No. 39, on 7 May 2012.

She reached the second round of the Carlsbad Open, losing to Dominika Cibulková.

She missed all 2012 tournaments after the US Open due to a right hip injury. At the end of the year, she was world No. 67.

=== 2013: Re-advance to top 50 ===
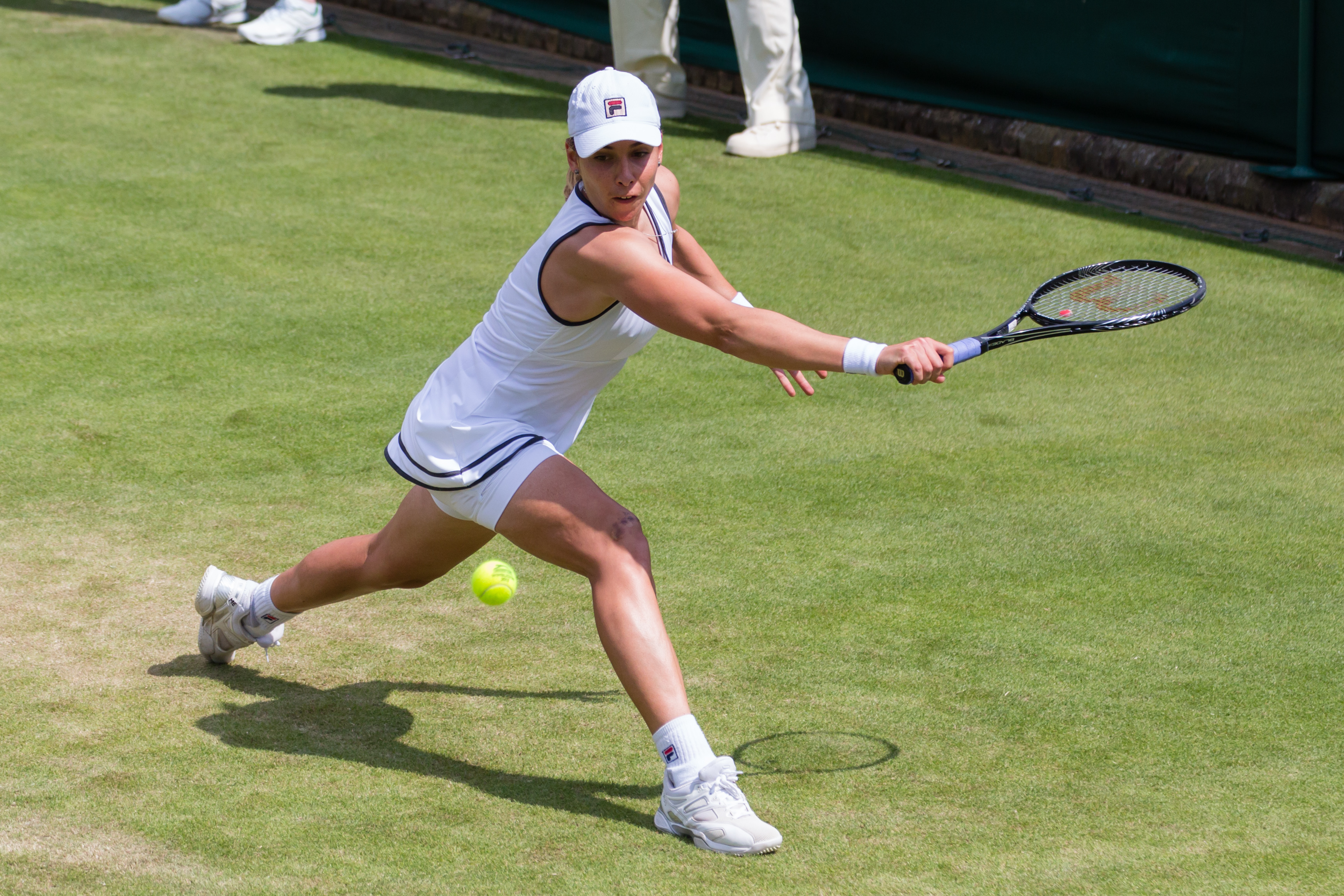
Erakovic at the 2013 Wimbledon Championships

Erakovic began the season at the Auckland Open, where she was defeated by Jamie Hampton in the second round, and with Heather Watson as her partner, was defeated in the quarterfinals of the doubles.

Erakovic lost in the first round of the Australian Open to Alizé Cornet. In February, she won her first WTA Tour singles tournament at the National Indoor Championships in Memphis. In doing so, she became the first New Zealander to win a WTA Tour singles title since Belinda Cordwell won the 1989 Singapore Open. It was to be the last time the tournament was played. Then Erakovic teamed up with former world No. 1, Cara Black, and they had immediate success together, reaching the finals of three European tournaments.

At the French Open, Erakovic upset 16th seed Dominika Cibulková in the second round, before losing to 17th seed Sloane Stephens in the third round, thus missing out on a fourth-round match against defending champion Maria Sharapova. She and Black made it to the quarterfinals of the doubles, losing in three sets to second seeds Andrea Hlaváčková and Lucie Hradecká.

She was beaten by Laura Robson in the third round at Wimbledon, after being a set up and serving for the match. Seeded 11th, she and Black were beaten in the second round by Eugenie Bouchard and Petra Martić, 7–6, 7–6.

At the US Open, Erakovic lost her first-round singles match to María Teresa Torró Flor 0–6, 4–6, while she and Black, seeded 13th, lost in a marathon third-round doubles match, again to the second seeds (this time Makarova and Vesnina). Seeded sixth, she reached the final of the Challenge Bell for the second time, defeating Mallory Burdette, Barbora Záhlavová-Strýcová, Ajla Tomljanović and Christina McHale before losing in straight sets to Lucie Šafářová.

Erakovic lost in qualifying in both the Pan Pacific Open in Tokyo and the China Open in Beijing. Her doubles partnership with Black had ended, as Black joined forces with Sania Mirza to win both those tournaments and announced that the new partners intended to stay together through 2014. Although Erakovic was drawn to play doubles in Beijing with Elena Vesnina, she withdrew from that competition and all tournaments for the remainder of the year after the death of her grandmother.

The end of the year found her as 46th ranked player.

=== 2014: Regress to top 80 ===
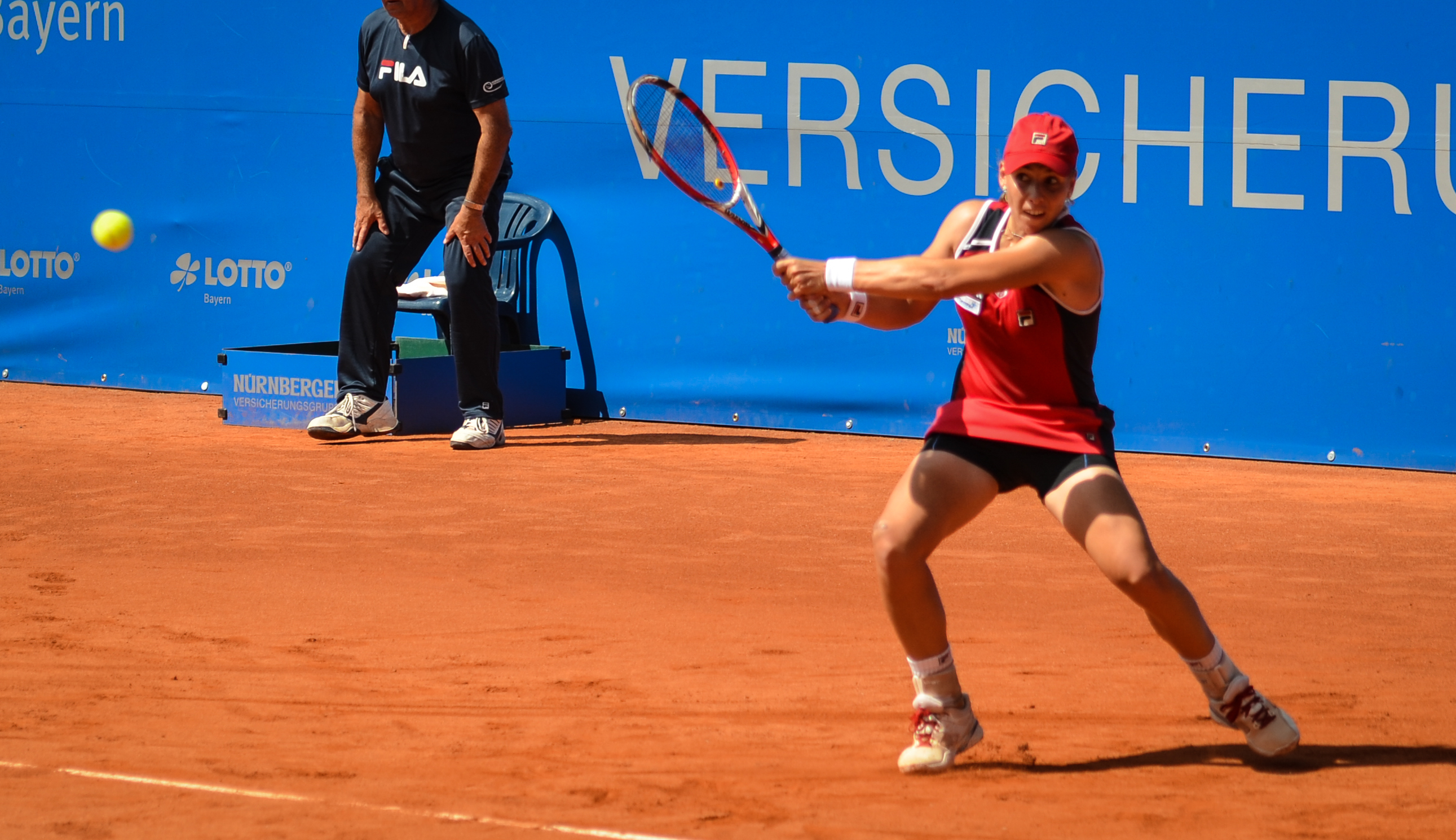
Erakovic at the 2014 Nürnberger Versicherungscup

In 2014, Marina Erakovic experienced mixed results in various tournaments. She began at the Auckland Open, facing early exits in both singles and doubles, the latter with partner Zheng Jie. At the Australian Open, Erakovic achieved a notable first-round win but was eliminated in the second round. Her doubles efforts alongside Zheng also ended in the first round. Erakovic's early-season struggles continued with first-round losses in both singles and doubles at indoor events in Paris and the Qatar.

Erakovic's performance improved at the Mexican Open, where she advanced to the quarterfinals in singles. However, her doubles campaign, this time with Ashleigh Barty, was cut short due to Barty's withdrawal. At Indian Wells and the Miami Open, she had limited success in doubles with Petra Martić and faced early singles exits.

Erakovic's clay-court season was highlighted by a win against Nadia Petrova at the Charleston Open, but she experienced early losses in subsequent tournaments. Another hip injury affected her performance, leading to a first-round defeat at the French Open.

The grass-court season was challenging with early exits at the Birmingham Classic and in Wimbledon. However, she achieved success at the Rosmalen Open, winning the doubles title with Arantxa Parra Santonja.

Erakovic ended her season with a series of tournaments across the globe, including the US Open, where she recorded her first singles win at the event. However, she faced early defeats in other tournaments, including the Pan Pacific Open in Tokyo and the China Open.

Throughout the year, Erakovic experienced changes in coaching and partnered with different players in doubles. Despite some high points, her ranking fell outside the top 100 by the end of the year."

=== 2015: Slow regress and out of top 100 ===
Erakovic started the new year, as usual, in the Auckland Open, still with Eduardo Nicolás as her coach, but with a new doubles partner in Monica Puig. They made a shaky start to their career together, needing a super tie-break to win their first match, and then went down to second seeds Andrea Hlaváčková and Lucie Hradecká, again through a super tie-break, in the second round (quarterfinals). Drawn against each other in the singles, it was Erakovic who prevailed in three sets, and was then defeated by eventual semi-finalist Záhlavová-Strýcová, again in three sets.

She won her first singles qualifying match at the Sydney International, but lost her second to defending doubles champion, Tímea Babos, in straight sets. Reunited with Arantxa Parra Santonja in the doubles, the partnership went out in the first round to Bethanie Mattek-Sands and Sania Mirza, losing in straight sets in under an hour. The following week saw the start of the first major event of the year, the Australian Open. Drawn against 24th seed Garbiñe Muguruza in the first round, she lost in straight sets. Reunited with Puig in the doubles, they were drawn against 13th seeds Krajicek and Záhlavová-Strýcová, again losing, by 7–6, 6–7, 3–6.

Her run at this tournament had exactly the same consequences for Erakovic as her experience in Washington the year before – she was unable to compete in the qualifying rounds of the next tournament, the Dubai Championships. She was, however, able to sign up for doubles, partnered this time with Heather Watson. They defeated the Chan sisters in the first round 13–11 in a super tie-break. In the second round they faced seventh seeds Caroline Garcia and Katarina Srebotnik. Watson dropped both her service games in the first set, and they each dropped one in the second set. Despite saving three match points on Srebotnik's serve at 2–5 in the second set, and winning the game, Erakovic and Watson were unable to prevent Garcia from serving out her last game to love to win the match 6–3, 6–4.

Erakovic stayed in the Persian Gulf to compete the following week's Premier tournament in Doha, but retired due to a viral illness in her first singles qualifying match, when down 3–6, 0–3 against Tímea Babos. It was not a memorable end to her 500th singles match on the professional tour. The illness may have been more severe than Erakovic first thought, as several other players also pulled out of the tournament with the same complaint. Luckily her first doubles match, with new partner Gabriela Dabrowski, was not scheduled until two days later, and they beat the Ukrainian pair of Yuliya Beygelzimer and Olga Savchuk 10–8 in the super tie-break. They didn't fare so well in the second round (quarterfinal), when beaten 6–3, 6–2 by Chan Hao-ching and Casey Dellacqua, managing to win only five service points in the second set.

Erakovic missed the next week of tournaments, opting for additional practice ahead of the first Premier Mandatory tournament of the year, the Indian Wells Open. For the first time ever, she progressed past the first round. After a scrappy win over wildcard entry Grace Min, she came up against 27th seed Timea Bacsinszky, who had won her two previous tournaments in Mexico. Erakovic got the only break of service to take the first set, but from there on her second service let her down. Unable to gain even one break point in the second set, she was unable to convert either of the two she received in the third set, the final score being 4–6, 6–3, 6–2 to Bacsinszky. In the doubles, she was reunited with Arantxa Parra Santonja, but once again they came up against high seeds in the first round. This time the stumbling blocks were the Spanish fifth seeds in Garbiñe Muguruza and Carla Suárez Navarro, who overpowered the lower-ranked pair 6–1, 6–4, in just over an hour. Once again, the second service was the bogey, as they won only four out of 19 during the match.

Next, at the Premier Mandatory Miami Open, Erakovic served superbly in the first qualifying round to beat Alexandra Panova, then not quite so well against Lourdes Domínguez Lino, but won both matches in straight sets to progress to. Up against wildcard Daria Gavrilova in the main draw, with a second-round match against Maria Sharapova at stake, she injured her left ankle during the first set and had to retire while trailing 1–5. Although her first-round match (with new partner Andrea Petkovic) was not until two days later, the injury was severe enough to force Erakovic's withdrawal.

At the first clay-court tournament for the year, the Charleston Open, her first-round match against South African Chanelle Scheepers was a topsy-turvy affair. Erakovic dropped her serve three times in the first set, breaking Scheepers only once, but broke her twice in the second set while holding her own throughout. The final set saw plenty of chances go begging for both players. Erakovic dropped her second and fourth service games, the latter ending with consecutive double faults, to be down 2–5. She broke Scheepers in the next game, then held her own service to be down 4–5. Scheepers double-faulted twice on match point but held service at her third attempt to run out the winner 6–2, 2–6, 6–4 in 2 hours and 9 minutes. She has now won all three of her matches against Erakovic. Finally able to take the court with Petkovic as her doubles partner, they won their first two matches in straight sets, demolishing the fourth seeds, Tímea Babos and Anna-Lena Grönefeld, 6–1, 6–2, in the quarterfinal. The semifinal saw Casey Dellacqua and Darija Jurak take the first set 6–4 in a see-saw affair, and then Erakovic and Petkovic raced through the second set to win it 6–1. Although Petkovic served an ace during the super tie-break, she also finished with a double-fault to hand the deciding set to Dellacqua and Jurak 5–10.

Erakovic skipped the following tournament in Stuttgart, choosing instead to wait a further week until the only African stop on the WTA Tour, the Morocco Open at Marrakesh. Playing only singles, she faced Kristina Mladenovic in the first round. She lost her opening service game, and despite several chances in Mladenovic's first two long service games, could not break back, instead being broken again to lose the first set 2–6. Mladenovic then dropped service twice in the second set, to Erakovic's once, the latter taking the set 6–3. Erakovic dropped her service to love in both her second and third service games in the deciding set and, although she broke back to 2–5, and saved two match points in the last game, Mladenovic eventually triumphed 6–3. Although Erakovic's first serve went well, the biggest difference between the players was again the second service, where Erakovic was able to win only eight points in the match, out of 29 attempts, compared with 22 from 44 for Mladenovic.

==== Mid-year: Back to Europe ====
At the Madrid Open, she drew Kateryna Bondarenko in her first-round qualifying singles match. Erakovic opened with a hard-fought three-set win. Three hours later she was back on court for her second qualifying match, against Monica Niculescu, eventually taking the match 2–6, 7–6, 6–3. Her first-round proper was against her new doubles partner, Julia Görges, the final score being 6–1, 0–6, 6–4. In their first-round doubles match they came up against the wildcard pair of Lisa Raymond and Madison Keys, to whom they lost 5–7, 6–3, [6–10].

Next stop was in Rome for the Italian Open, where Erakovic lost her first-round qualifying singles match to Christina McHale in straight sets and did not enter the doubles. She skipped the following week's tournaments, despite originally entering the Nuremberg event, and waited until the next stop on the tour – at Stade Roland Garros.

Erakovic's terrible luck with the draw in major tournaments continued in Paris, as she started her campaign against fourth seed Petra Kvitová, victor in all four of their previous encounters (including the second round of this event a year earlier). For the very first time in a major, Erakovic had a singles match on the Centre Court (Philippe Chatrier). Starting a red-hot favourite with bookmakers, Kvitová survived a break point in her first service game, and three more in her second, before dropping her third in a game which included an ace and two double-faults. Erakovic held serve to lead 4–2 but couldn't maintain the momentum as Kvitová broke back twice to take the set 6–4, her final service game being the only one where she did not offer a break point. Despite an excessive number of unforced errors, Kvitová was able to pull out the big points when it mattered most. Although Erakovic served well, her returns were not as consistent as they needed to be, and resulted in a disastrous eight unforced errors as she served the final game of the set.

The second set again had too many unforced errors, but this time it was Kvitová who was broken three times to Erakovic's once, the New Zealander winning the set 6–3. In contrast to the first two sets, where there had been 14 and 11 deuces respectively, the third and deciding set had only two, in Erakovic's first and fourth service games. Kvitová broke in the third game of the set, but immediately dropped her own service to love. They both also dropped their fourth service games, but Erakovic was broken in her next as well to be down 4–5. There were no worries for Kvitová as she served out to love, taking the match 6–4, 3–6, 6–4.

As if the singles draw wasn't bad enough, Erakovic and Heather Watson started their doubles run against the third seeds Tímea Babos and Kristina Mladenovic. Dropping serve twice in the first set, and only breaking the seeds' service once, the first set was over in not much more than half an hour. The second set, however, was a different story. Each team lost one service game, leading to a tie-break with the score at 6–all. After winning their first serve, and splitting the first pair of points against them, Erakovic and Watson had to watch as Babos and Mladenovic won six straight points to take the set and the match 6–4, 7–6.

The grass-court season began the following week, with Erakovic choosing to play again at the Rosmalen Open. She did not defend her doubles title, however, playing only singles. In the first round she beat Carina Witthöft in straight sets. Having missed out on four break points to win the match at 5–4 in the second set, she had to wait a further 20 minutes until she won in a tie-break. In the second round, she met Yaroslava Shvedova who had beaten top-seed Eugenie Bouchard in the first round. Erakovic started badly, dropping serve in the first and fifth games before breaking Shvedova to pull back to 3–5, but both then held serve for the Kazakhstani representative to win 6–4. In the second set Erakovic was broken in her third service game and, despite surviving three match points in the final game, could not break Shvedova, the final score being 6–4, 6–4.

Next stop was Erakovic's first English tournament of the year, the Premier level Birmingham Classic, and again she competed only in the singles. Placed in the qualifying draw, she started with a 6–1, 6–2 win over Alla Kudryavtseva in just over an hour, which included three consecutive aces to win her second service game. The match could not be completed before nightfall on the first day, but Erakovic wrapped it up in just nine minutes on the second morning. Starting just two hours later, her second-round match was a titanic struggle against Belgian Kirsten Flipkens. Erakovic dropped one service game in the first set; they each dropped one in the second, forcing a tiebreaker which Erakovic won comfortably 7–1; and they both held serve through the third set until the rain came with Flipkens leading 6–5. After a break of more than an hour, the players returned to see Erakovic hold her nerve, and her serve, to set up another tiebreaker. She prevailed again, the final score being 4–6, 7–6, 7–6.

Into the main draw, her first match was against Petra Cetkovská, whom she beat 6–4, 6–2, to remain unbeaten in their four meetings. Next up was another meeting with Hantuchová, who had beaten Erakovic in the semifinal in Pattaya, and this was yet another match affected by weather. Rain came after 25 minutes, with the score at 3–3, and Hantuchová promptly dropped her service on the resumption. She broke Erakovic's serve three games later, however, and they went to a tiebreaker. Erakovic held a set point at 6–5 but couldn't convert, whereas Hantuchová converted her first set point to take the tie-break 8–6 after an hour's play. Erakovic then dropped the first game of the second set. There were no other breaks of service, although Hantuchová had one more opportunity, and eventually the Slovak ran out the winner 7–6, 6–4.

The final Premier-level English tournament is the Eastbourne International. Erakovic again started in the qualifying singles draw, where she began with a comfortable win over Lesia Tsurenko in just over an hour. The only time she dropped her service was when broken to love in the first game of the second set, but she broke Tsurenko's serve in the fourth and eight games before serving out to love. Her second match, against top-seed Daria Gavrilova, was a very different story. She broke the young Russian's serve in the first and fifth games to lead 4–1, but then lost four in a row before eventually holding her last two service games and forcing a tiebreaker. Erakovic dropped two set points before prevailing in just under an hour. The second set started the opposite way to the first, with Erakovic the player down 4–1. Although she held her next service game, Gavrilova served out to take the set 6–2. Unable to convert a break point in Gavrilova's first service game of the deciding set, Erakovic then lost her own serve before breaking back in the eighth game to level at 4–4. She held her own serve, then broke Gavrilova to take the set and the match, 7–6, 2–6, 6–4, in 2 hours and 35 minutes.

Gavrilova also ended up going into the main draw, however, as the highest-ranked loser. She took top seed Petra Kvitová's spot, and won her way to the quarterfinals before withdrawing due to an abdominal muscle injury. Erakovic, meanwhile, faced Bulgarian Tsvetana Pironkova in the first round, a match which was all over in just 55 minutes. Erakovic dropped her last two service games in both sets, with Pironkova winning 6–2, 6–2. Scheduled to play doubles for the first time since the French Open, Erakovic was denied the chance when her first-time partner Eugenie Bouchard suffered an abdominal strain in her singles match against eventual title winner Belinda Bencic, just two hours before their doubles match was due to begin.

Erakovic began her campaign at the Wimbledon Championships with a singles match against 95th-ranked Yulia Putintseva. In one of the longest sets she had ever played, only three games had been completed after 26 minutes. The first two took six and eight minutes, and then Erakovic took 12 minutes to serve her second and fourth games (20 and 18 points respectively) as every game went with serve through to six-all after an hour and 11 minutes. The tie-break took a further nine minutes, with Erakovic taking a 5–2 lead before Putintseva stormed back with five successive points to win the set. With Putintseva serving first, the second set also went with serve for the first eleven games. Erakovic then blew a 30–15 lead with three backhand unforced errors to lose the set and the match 6–7, 5–7. She had committed 43 unforced errors, as well as serving five double faults, compared with 29 unforced errors and no double-faults from her opponent.

In the doubles she was again partnered by Watson, and their first match was against Bojana Jovanovski and Nadiia Kichenok. Dropping their second service game, then trailing 1–4, they won the next five games to take the first set in 32 minutes. They broke service again in the third game of the second set, and had a match break point at 5–3 but couldn't convert. They then dropped their own serve to be level at 5–5 after being two points from victory. Eventually they went to a tie-break where, from 3–all at the first change of ends, they lost only one more point, the final score being 6–4, 7–6.

Their second-round match was against the 16th seeded pair of Medina Garrigues and Erakovic's former partner, Parra Santonja. Breaking the Spaniards' serve twice, they raced to a 4–1 lead, but Erakovic and Watson then each dropped their own service game to bring the match back to parity. Games then went with serve to yet another tie-break, where they were only able to win two points. On the right end of three service breaks in the second set, Erakovic and Watson were eventually able to serve out for the win on their fourth set point. The deciding set, however, was in complete contrast to the first two, as Medina Garrigues and Parra Santonja raced through in just 25 minutes without losing a game. The final score in favour of the seeded pair was 7–6, 3–6, 6–0.

Erakovic injured a knee at Eastbourne and, although she continued on to play at Wimbledon, she then returned home to Auckland for six weeks' rest and rehabilitation.

==== Back to the U.S. – and injury ends her year ====
Playing singles only, Erakovic returned to the tour at the Cincinnati Open where, in a scrappy first-round qualifying match that saw more service breaks than holds, she lost to Kurumi Nara, 4–6, 3–6. She also played singles only at the Connecticut Open. She beat Lucie Hradecká in the first round of qualifying, Erakovic winning the first set 6–4, and losing the second 3–6. They had a service break each early in the third set, then held serve until the tenth game of the set, when Erakovic broke to win the match 6–4, 3–6, 6–4. She had identical scorelines for the first two sets against Olga Savchuk in the second round of qualifying, then broke Savchuk's first service game of the third set to lead 3–0. However, she dropped her own service when leading 4–2, and games then went with service until Erakovic was broken to love to make the score 6–5 in favour of Savchuk. The latter then served out to love to win the match 4–6, 6–3, 7–5.

At the US Open, Erakovic was drawn against second seed Simona Halep in the first round. Serving first, she started with three consecutive backhand unforced errors, dropping both that and her fourth service game as Halep took the first set 6–2 in 32 minutes. After receiving treatment on her troublesome knee during the break between sets, Erakovic was broken in her first two service games to be down 0–3, and retired from the match. Scheduled to play doubles with Watson against Krajicek and Strýcová the following day, she was forced to default.

Two weeks later, having returned home, she announced that she would not be playing again in 2015 to allow her knee time to fully recover. She finished the year with a singles ranking at 135, rather higher than the first estimate of "below 160".

=== 2016 ===
==== Auckland, then Australia ====
Feeling well-rested and hopefully injury-free, although obviously rusty from lack of match fitness, Erakovic returned to the tour with a wildcard entry into her home tournament, the Auckland Open. Drawn against Yulia Putintseva, the pair battled hard for two hours, through two tie-breakers, before Erakovic prevailed 7–6, 7–6. She converted only two of seven break points in the first set, and was unable to win even a solitary point on her second serve. The second set, however, showed a marked improvement in the latter, as she picked up 10 points from her 13-second serves. Her second-round match, against Alexandra Dulgheru, again featured a tie-break, but this time the New Zealander lost 4–7. They traded service breaks to start the second set, but Dulgheru finished much the stronger to run out the winner 7–6, 6–3.

In the doubles, Erakovic teamed up with Sílvia Soler Espinosa for the first time in close to ten years. In the first round, they were drawn against local wildcards Sacha Jones and Rosie Cheng. After losing the first two games they won the next six, and the set. The second set was closer, eventually going to a tie-break, but the far more experienced pair prevailed comfortably in the finish, the final score being 6–2, 7–6. Their second round (quarterfinal) was against the second seeds Görges and Srebotnik. The first three service games were all lost, and it was Soler Espinosa holding serve that saw them eventually take the first set. She dropped both her second and third service games in the second set, however, as the seeds bounced back to level the match. Erakovic and Soler Espinosa raced away to a 6–1 lead in the match tie-break, losing only two points on their own service as they eventually won 6–4, 4–6, [10–7].

The semi-final was against Danka Kovinić and Barbora Strýcová, and an inability to convert break points cost Erakovic and Soler Espinosa dearly. They missed three in the very first game, eventually gaining only two of the ten offered. Kovinić and Strýcová fared slightly better, claiming three of eight break points to take the set 6–4. With only one service break apiece, the second set was much tighter. With Erakovic serving to stay in the match at 4–5, she was 15–30 down when rain forced a halt, the match resuming the following day. Kovinić and Strýcová took only a couple of minutes to get the two points they needed to win the match, 6–4, 6–4.

At the Australian Open, Erakovic was drawn in the first round of qualifying against Michelle Larcher de Brito, and took the first set 6–0 in 26 minutes. Although her first service game had three deuces, Larcher de Brito's set was full of unforced errors. The second set was more even, with both players making more mistakes than winners, until Erakovic dropped her serve for the third time in the set, meaning that Larcher de Brito levelled the set count at one-all. The third set saw more of the same before Larcher de Brito, having held one match point at 4–5, was able to break Erakovic's serve again at 5–6 to win the match 0–6, 6–4, 7–5. With her doubles ranking having also tumbled during her time out, and despite having made the semifinals at Auckland, Erakovic was unable to find a partner ranked high enough to get her into the doubles draw for the first major of the year.

==== Rio and Rabat ====
Erakovic resumed in the Rio Open, where she teamed up again with Soler Espinosa in the doubles. Seeded second, they started with a comfortable 6–2, 6–2 win over Carolina Alves and Heidi El Tabakh, but the second round match was far tougher. Their opponents, Tara Moore and Conny Perrin, broke Soler Espinosa's first service game, but the seeds broke back to level at four all. Erakovic and Soler Espinosa were unable to convert either of two break points at 6–5 to take the set, and a tie-break followed. Down 2–4 at the first changeover, Moor and Perrin then picked up five consecutive points to take the set. In total contrast, Erakovic and Soler Espinosa raced through the second set to win 6–0 in just 27 minutes, a rain break halfway through doing nothing to stop their progress. The match tie-break saw them battle back from 2–5 down to lead 8–7, but Moore and Perrin were able to take the next three points to complete an upset result, 7–6, 0–6, [10–8].

In the singles, Erakovic started with an epic three-hour marathon against María Teresa Torró Flor. Breaking the Spaniard's serve twice and holding three set points on her own serve at 5–2, 40–0, Erakovic served three consecutive double faults as she dropped that game, and her next, before Torró Flor won a 14-point game to go ahead 6–5. Erakovic held serve to force the tie-break where, despite dropping four of her own serves in a row, she finally prevailed 10–8. It was a similar story in the second set as both players dropped serve twice on the way to another tie-break. Between them, the pair won only three of their service points as Torró Flor, having held three set points, eventually won 7–5. The third set was rather more straightforward as Erakovic broke Torró Flor's serve twice on the way to a final score of 7–6, 6–7, 6–2. Her second-round match against Petra Martić was half an hour shorter, again featuring a first set tie-break. Five double faults at inopportune times through the set saw Martić eventually take the tie-break 7–2, but it was a different story in the second set. Erakovic served much better and was able to take the only service break in the set. Martić was much the stronger in the deciding set, however, breaking Erakovic twice to run out the winner 7–6, 5–7, 6–2.

The highlight of Erakovic's clay-court season was the tournament in Rabat, Morocco, where she played three rounds of qualifying, then went all the way through the main draw to the final before losing 2–6, 1–6 to world No. 15, Timea Bacsinszky, having beaten subsequent Nürnberg singles and doubles winner Kiki Bertens in three sets in the semifinal. She played eight games in eight days – perhaps it wasn't surprising that she had had enough by the time she reached the final.

Beaten in the first round of qualifying for the French Open, she had far more success at Wimbledon. Winning her three qualifying matches, she beat Irina Falconi and 22nd seed Jelena Janković in the first two rounds, before bowing out to 12th seed Carla Suárez Navarro in the third. It was her best result in a major tournament since losing at the same stage at Wimbledon three years earlier. While her singles ranking jumped more than 40 places to 115, her doubles ranking plummeted more than sixty places to 255. She had not played doubles since her first-round win with Karin Knapp in Katowice at the beginning of April (they had to default the second round after Knapp was injured playing singles).

After Wimbledon, she played in the Croatian and Swedish Opens on clay, then returned to New Zealand for an extended break before the US Open.

==== USA and Asia ====
At Flushing Meadows, she lost in the first round of singles qualifying to Wang Yafan. Surprisingly, she teamed up again with Parra Santonja to play doubles, winning the first-round match against Aleksandra Krunić and Andreea Mitu, but losing their second to 11th seeds Xu Yifang and Zheng Saisai. This was followed by losses in the first round at Seoul (to Patricia Maria Tig) and in the first qualifying round of the Premier tournament at Wuhan (to Louisa Chirico). She won both her qualifying singles matches in Hong Kong, but was beaten in a close match in the first round proper by Heather Watson, 7–5, 7–6. Partnered by local player Zhang Ling in the doubles, they won a tight first-round match before going down to the top-seeded Chan sisters from Taipei, the final score being 6–4, 6–3.

Erakovic then took a short break before heading to Taipei for her first WTA 125 tournament, where she reached the semifinals before losing to local player Chang Kai-chen. The final tournament of the year was in Honolulu, where she lost in the second round to Zhang Shuai. The points she earned from these last two tournaments lifted her singles ranking to 105, the mark she was hoping to reach to guarantee a main draw slot for the Australian Open.

=== 2017–18 ===
==== Start of the year ====
With her ranking being so low, Erakovic required a wildcard to enter the main draw of the first tournament of the year, the Auckland Open. Drawn against one of the leading juniors from 2016, Jeļena Ostapenko, who was to find fame a few months later as the winner of the French Open, she was never comfortable as the young Latvian raced through the match to win 6–1, 6–2.

She missed the Australian tournaments the following week, electing to go straight to Melbourne for the Australian Open. Drawn against seventh seed Garbiñe Muguruza, to whom she had lost at the same point two years earlier, she had a royal chance to reverse that result once it became clear that Muguruza was finding it uncomfortable to play with a hamstring strain incurred in her previous match in Brisbane. Erakovic held a set point on Muguruza's serve at 5–4, but couldn't convert, and then dropped her own serve as Muguruza went on to take the first set 7–5. A long medical time-out followed before Muguruza reappeared with her thigh heavily strapped. Erakovic broke service to lead 4–1, and was two points away from another break, with Muguruza moving very gingerly, when everything turned against the New Zealander. Muguruza managed to hold that serve, and then won the next four games in a row as Erakovic made a string of unforced errors. The final score was 7–5, 6–4. Once again, with her ranking so low, Erakovic was unable to find a partner to compete in the doubles.

Next stop for Erakovic was the Taiwan Open where, again only playing singles, she won her two qualifying matches as top seed, and then faced third seed Caroline Garcia in the main draw. Although the unforced error count on return strokes was quite even, Garcia was unstoppable when it came to hitting forehand winners, taking that part of the contest by 18 to 4. Erakovic broke Garcia's serve in the second set at the only opportunity she had, but was able to hold her own service only once in that set. She also served seven double faults through the match, and eventually lost 3–6, 2–6.

==== North America (1) ====
Erakovic then took a break for a month before resuming in the Mexican Open in Acapulco. She won her first qualifying match, but was well-beaten by Jamie Loeb in the second, going down 6–4, 6–0. The next stop on the tour was Indian Wells where, almost unbelievably, she was drawn in the first round of qualifying against Jamie Loeb again. While this match was closer, taking nearly two and a half hours and going to a third set, the result was the same, with Loeb taking the match 6–4, 6–7, 6–1 after five match points.

The tour then moved to the Miami Open, where Erakovic won through qualifying against Naomi Broady and Françoise Abanda before facing Shelby Rogers in the first round. After an epic three-set struggle lasting two hours and 39 minutes, Rogers prevailed 4–6, 6–3, 7–6. Erakovic's second serve let her down badly after the first set, her 13 double-faults costing her the match.

At the Premier-level Charleston Open, the only WTA tournament played on green clay, Erakovic was able to get into the main draw as the last direct acceptance, and faced Tunisian lucky loser Ons Jabeur in her first-round match. Erakovic appeared to strain her neck during the first set, and required a medical time-out as well as a couple of other treatments from the physio. Broken once in the first set, she faded badly in the second to eventually lose 4–6, 1–6.

She then dropped to the ITF Circuit the following week when, seeded fourth in singles, she lost in three sets in the first round at Indian Harbour Beach to Sesil Karatantcheva. She also played doubles, for the first time since Auckland, with Canadian Aleksandra Wozniak as her partner. After winning their first match very easily, they had to default their second. Erakovic then returned to Auckland for rest and treatment of her neck injury, having confirmed that she would be in the main draw at the French Open, although relegated to the qualifying tournament for Wimbledon.

==== Into Europe ====
Erakovic resumed tournament play at Nürnberg, losing in the first round of qualifying to Aleksandrina Naydenova, before moving to Paris. In the first round at Roland Garros, she drew her Miami nemesis, Shelby Rogers. Breaking Rogers' serve to lead 4–2, she promptly lost her own serve in the next game as they moved to a tie-break to decide the first set. Erakovic was up 4–1 before Rogers, with a mixture of winners and forced errors, took the next six points to win the tie-break 7–4. The second set went with service for the first nine games before Erakovic, serving at 30–all, committed two unforced errors to lose the game, and the match, 6–7, 4–6.

No longer required in Paris, Erakovic headed to London for the start of the grass-court season in the ITF Surbiton Trophy. Beaten in the second round of singles by Evgeniya Rodina, she went all the way to final of the doubles with her new partner, Chang Kai-chen of Chinese Taipei, where they lost in straight sets to the Australian pair of Monique Adamczak and Storm Sanders. The result, however, was enough to improve Erakovic's ranking by nearly 50 places, bringing her back inside the top 200. In the first round of singles at the next ITF event, the Manchester Trophy, Erakovic looked very comfortable in the early stages of her match against Aleksandra Krunić, jumping out to a 7–5, 3–0 lead. She then lost six games in a row to lose the second set and, although she held her first two service games in the third set, Krunić then won another four in a row to wrap up the match 7–5, 6–3, 6–2. It was a different story in the doubles, where Erakovic and Chang again went through to the final. In a match marred by copious unforced errors, they were again runners-up, this time to Magdalena Fręch and An-Sophie Mestach, with the final score being 4–6, 6–7.

Less than four hours later, Erakovic was more than a hundred kilometres away in Ilkley, West Yorkshire, to start the next tournament in the series. And, two and a half hours after that, she had won an exhausting first round singles qualifying match against American Alexandra Stevenson, 6–7, 7–5, 6–0. Playing singles only, she eventually went all the way to the semifinals, where she lost to Alison Van Uytvanck in straight sets, 4–6, 2–6. From there it was on to Roehampton, and a successful run through the qualifying rounds for Wimbledon, with an emphatic win over Australian teenager Destanee Aiava sealing her place in the main draw. Unfortunately she drew second seed Simona Halep as her opponent and, not playing as well as she had in the qualifying matches, lost in straight sets, 4–6, 1–6. The loss of the points from her success the year before meant that her ranking dropped 50 places to 179. She flew home for a short break, before heading to the US and an ITF tournament in California.

==== Back to North America ====
At the Sacramento tournament, after winning the first set in her opening match against Jennifer Elie, Erakovic dropped the second set and was forced to retire with an injury. Taking a few days off to recover, she moved to the Premier event at Stanford where, after a comfortable win over Raquel Atawo in the first round of qualifying, and a gruelling 2 hours and 40 minute match against American teenager Michaela Gordon, she was drawn to meet Ana Konjuh in the first round. Unfortunately her neck injury recurred, and she had to retire with the score at 6–3, 1–0 to Konjuh. Set to play WTA doubles for the first time since Auckland, she was paired with Ajla Tomljanović who also had to withdraw from her first-round singles through injury. The latter's problem with her right shoulder was what forced them to default the doubles match.

Next up was the US Open, and Erakovic's poor year continued, being beaten in the first round of singles qualifying by 18 year old Hungarian Fanny Stollár. Broken early in both sets, she lost in just over an hour. She had better luck at the Coupe Banque Nationale in Québec, where she won her first round singles match against Alla Kudryavtseva before losing to eventual champion Alison Van Uytvanck, in a match which was riddled with errors from both players. She also played doubles, with Julia Glushko, meeting the fourth seeds Naomi Broady and Asia Muhammad in the first round. The first set in this match was over very quickly as Erakovic and Glushko managed to hold serve only once, but the second was much tighter, with breaks of service traded before going to a tie-break. A double-fault at a crucial time cost them momentum when leading, and Broady and Muhammad eventually prevailed in two sets.

Possibly the lowest point of her recent career followed as she moved to an ITF tournament in Albuquerque, New Mexico. In the first round, she beat her doubles partner Laura Robson in three sets, and then met the world No. 511, wildcard American Sanaz Marand. In another three-setter which lasted over two hours, Marand raced away to win 6–4, 3–6, 6–1, as Erakovic served up 13 double-faults. She saved two match points in the final game, but that wasn't enough. To add further to her woes, she and Robson were bundled out in the first round of the doubles by Ulrikke Eikeri and An-Sophie Mestach, going down 6–10 in the match tie-break.

The following tournament, at Templeton in California, saw Erakovic beat Grace Min and Anna Karolína Schmiedlová in the first two rounds to make the quarterfinals, where she lost to Sachia Vickery, in straight sets. She then had four weeks off, before returning in an ITF tournament in Macon, Georgia. She lost in the first round in both singles and doubles, and followed that up with another first-round loss two weeks later in Waco, Texas, Eikeri again proving her nemesis.

In that year, her level dropped to such an extent that her poor run to end the North American ITF Circuit left her ranked outside the top 200 for the first time in seven years. Her doubles ranking had started the year on the back foot in any case, due to a lack of play in 2016. Unable to find a partner at any tournament until halfway through the year, where she and Chang Kai-chen went quite well in England, she again finished the year without a partner. Her ranking slid all the way to 290, the lowest it had been for eight years.

Injury again took its toll, ending her season prematurely and then causing her to miss her home tournament (the Auckland Open) for the first time since 2005. She subsequently would miss all of the 2018 season, and eventually announced her retirement on 11 December.

== Equipment and apparel ==
Erakovic used Wilson K Blade tennis rackets and wore Fila apparel.

== Performance timelines ==
Key
W	F	SF	QF	#R	RR	Q#	P#	DNQ	A	Z#	PO	G	S	B	NMS	NTI	P	NH

(W) winner; (F) finalist; (SF) semifinalist; (QF) quarterfinalist; (#R) rounds 4, 3, 2, 1; (RR) round-robin stage; (Q#) qualification round; (P#) preliminary round; (DNQ) did not qualify; (A) absent; (Z#) Davis/Fed Cup Zonal Group (with number indication) or (PO) play-off; (G) gold, (S) silver or (B) bronze Olympic/Paralympic medal; (NMS) not a Masters tournament; (NTI) not a Tier I tournament; (P) postponed; (NH) not held; (SR) strike rate (events won / competed); (W–L) win–loss record.
To avoid confusion and double counting, these charts are updated at the conclusion of a tournament or when the player's participation has ended.

=== Singles ===
Tournament	2005	2006	2007	2008	2009	2010	2011	2012	2013	2014	2015	2016	2017	W–L
Grand Slam tournaments
Australian Open	A	A	Q2	Q1	2R	1R	Q2	2R	1R	2R	1R	Q1	1R	3–7
French Open	A	Q2	Q1	2R	A	A	1R	1R	3R	2R	1R	Q1	1R	4–7
Wimbledon	A	A	Q1	3R	A	Q2	2R	2R	3R	1R	1R	3R	1R	8–8
US Open	Q3	A	Q3	1R	A	A	1R	1R	1R	2R	1R	Q1	Q1	1–6
Win–loss	0–0	0–0	0–0	3–3	1–1	0–1	1–3	2–4	4–4	3–4	0–4	2–1	0–3	16–28
National representation
Summer Olympics	NH			1R	NH			1R	NH			A	NH	0–2
Premier Mandatory & 5
Dubai / Qatar Open (Note: The first Premier 5 event of the year has switched back and forth between the Dubai Tennis Championships and the Qatar Ladies Open since 2009. Dubai was classified as a Premier 5 event from 2009 to 2011 before being succeeded by Doha for the 2012–2014 period. In 2015, Dubai regained its Premier 5 status while Doha was demoted to Premier status. The Premier 5 tournaments were reclassified as WTA 1000 tournaments in 2021.)	NMS			A	A	A	A	A	A	1R	A	A	A	0–1
Indian Wells Open	A	A	Q1	Q1	1R	A	A	1R	1R	1R	2R	A	Q1	1–5
Miami Open	A	A	A	3R	1R	A	A	2R	1R	1R	1R	A	1R	3–7
German / Madrid Open (Note: In 2009, the German Open was replaced by the Madrid Open. The Premier Mandatory tournaments were reclassified as WTA 1000 tournaments in 2021.)	NH				A	A	A	1R	Q1	A	1R	A	A	0–2
Italian Open	A	A	A	A	A	A	A	2R	A	Q1	Q1	A	A	1–1
Canadian Open	A	A	A	A	A	Q1	Q1	A	A	A	A	A	A	0–0
Cincinnati Open	NMS				A	A	A	A	2R	Q1	Q1	A	A	1–1
Pan Pacific / Wuhan Open (Note: In 2014, the Pan Pacific Open was downgraded to a Premier event and replaced by the Wuhan Open. The Premier 5 tournaments were reclassified as WTA 1000 tournaments in 2021.)	A	A	A	1R	A	A	A	A	Q2	1R	A	Q1	A	0–2
China Open	NMS				A	A	A	A	Q2	Q2	A	A	A	0–0
Career statistics
Year-end ranking	213	160	161	60	232	324	61	67	48	76	134	113	164	6–19

=== Doubles ===
Tournament	2005	2006	2007	2008	2009	2010	2011	2012	2013	2014	2015	2016	2017	W–L
Grand Slam tournaments
Australian Open	A	A	A	A	1R	1R	1R	1R	1R	1R	1R	A	A	0–7
French Open	A	A	A	1R	A	A	A	2R	QF	QF	1R	A	A	7–5
Wimbledon	A	A	A	1R	A	1R	SF	3R	2R	1R	2R	A	A	8–7
US Open	A	A	A	QF	A	A	1R	1R	3R	2R	A	2R	A	7–6
Win–loss	0–0	0–0	0–0	3–3	0–1	0–2	4–3	3–4	6–4	4–4	1–3	1–1	0–0	22–25
Premier M & 5
Dubai / Qatar Open	NMS			A	A	A	A	A	A	1R	2R	A	A	1–2
Indian Wells Open	A	A	A	A	A	A	A	2R	2R	2R	1R	A	A	3–4
Miami Open	A	A	A	A	A	A	A	1R	A	1R	A	A	A	0–2
German / Madrid Open	NH				A	A	A	2R	F	A	1R	A	A	5–3
Italian Open	A	A	A	A	A	A	A	1R	A	QF	A	A	A	2–2
Canadian Open	A	A	A	A	A	1R	2R	A	A	1R	A	A	A	1–3
Cincinnati Open	NMS				A	A	A	A	1R	2R	A	A	A	1–2
Pan Pacific / Wuhan Open	A	A	A	A	A	A	A	A	1R	1R	A	A	A	0–2
China Open	NMS				A	A	A	A	A	1R	A	A	A	0–1
Career statistics
Year-end ranking	677	274	258	43	351	82	48	54	28	42	110	159	276	13–21

== Significant finals ==
=== Premier Mandatory & Premier 5 tournaments ===
==== Doubles: 1 (runner-up) ====
Result	Year	Tournament	Surface	Partner	Opponents	Score
Loss	2013	Madrid Open	Clay	(Zimbabwe) Cara Black	(Russia) Anastasia Pavlyuchenkova (Czech Republic) Lucie Šafářová	2–6, 4–6

== WTA Tour finals ==
=== Singles: 5 (1 title, 4 runner-ups) ===
Legend
Grand Slam tournaments
Premier M & Premier 5
Premier
International (1–4)

Result	W–L	Date	Tournament	Tier	Surface	Opponent	Score
Loss	0–1	Sep 2011	Tournoi de Québec, Canada	International	Carpet (i)	(Czech Republic) Barbora Strýcová	6–4, 1–6, 0–6
Loss	0–2	Feb 2012	National Indoors, US	International	Hard (i)	(Sweden) Sofia Arvidsson	3–6, 4–6
Win	1–2	Feb 2013	National Indoors, US	International	Hard (i)	(Germany) Sabine Lisicki	6–1, ret.
Loss	1–3	Sep 2013	Tournoi de Québec, Canada	International	Carpet (i)	(Czech Republic) Lucie Šafářová	4–6, 3–6
Loss	1–4	Apr 2016	Morocco Open	International	Clay	(Switzerland) Timea Bacsinszky	2–6, 1–6

=== Doubles: 16 (8 titles, 8 runner-ups) ===
Legend
Grand Slam tournaments
Premier M & Premier 5 (0–1)
Premier (1–1)
International (7–6)

Result	W–L	Date	Tournament	Tier	Surface	Partner	Opponents	Score
Loss	0–1	May 2008	İstanbul Cup, Turkey	Tier III (Note: In 2009, the WTA Tier II tournaments were reclassified as WTA Premier tournaments, while the WTA Tier III tournaments, WTA Tier IV tournaments and WTA Tier V tournaments were reclassified as WTA International tournaments.)	Clay	(Slovenia) Polona Hercog	(United States) Jill Craybas (Belarus) Olga Govortsova	1–6, 2–6
Win	1–1	Jun 2008	Rosmalen Open, Netherlands	Tier III	Grass	(Netherlands) Michaëlla Krajicek	(Latvia) Līga Dekmeijere (Germany) Angelique Kerber	6–3, 6–2
Win	2–1	Oct 2008	Japan Open	Tier III	Hard	(United States) Jill Craybas	(Japan) Ayumi Morita (Japan) Aiko Nakamura	4–6, 7–5, [10–6]
Win	3–1	Oct 2008	Luxembourg Open	Tier III	Hard	(Romania) Sorana Cîrstea	(Russia) Vera Dushevina (Ukraine) Mariya Koryttseva	2–6, 6–3, [10–8]
Win	4–1	Feb 2010	Pattaya Open, Thailand	International	Hard	(Thailand) Tamarine Tanasugarn	(Russia) Anna Chakvetadze (Russia) Ksenia Pervak	7–5, 6–1
Loss	4–2	Jul 2010	Slovenia Open	International	Hard	(Russia) Anna Chakvetadze	(Russia) Maria Kondratieva (Czech Republic) Vladimíra Uhlířová	4–6, 6–2, [7–10]
Loss	4–3	Jan 2011	Auckland Open, New Zealand	International	Hard	(Sweden) Sofia Arvidsson	(Czech Republic) Květa Peschke (Slovenia) Katarina Srebotnik	3–6, 0–6
Win	5–3	Oct 2011	Linz Open, Austria	International	Hard (i)	(Russia) Elena Vesnina	(Germany) Julia Görges (Germany) Anna-Lena Grönefeld	7–5, 6–1
Loss	5–4	Jan 2012	Hobart International, Australia	International	Hard	(Chinese Taipei) Chuang Chia-jung	(Romania) Irina-Camelia Begu (Romania) Monica Niculescu	7–6^{(7–4)}, 6–7^{(4–7)}, [5–10]
Win	6–4	Jul 2012	Stanford Classic, United States	Premier	Hard	(United Kingdom) Heather Watson	(Australia) Jarmila Gajdošová (United States) Vania King	7–5, 7–6^{(9–7)}
Win	7–4	Aug 2012	Texas Open, United States	International	Hard	(United Kingdom) Heather Watson	(Latvia) Līga Dekmeijere (United States) Irina Falconi	6–3, 6–0
Loss	7–5	May 2013	Madrid Open, Spain	Premier M	Clay	(Zimbabwe) Cara Black	(Russia) Anastasia Pavlyuchenkova (Czech Republic) Lucie Šafářová	2–6, 4–6
Loss	7–6	May 2013	Internationaux de Strasbourg, France	International	Clay	(Zimbabwe) Cara Black	(Japan) Kimiko Date-Krumm (South Africa) Chanelle Scheepers	4–6, 6–3, [12–14]
Loss	7–7	Jun 2013	Birmingham Classic, UK	International	Grass	(Zimbabwe) Cara Black	(Australia) Ashleigh Barty (Australia) Casey Dellacqua	5–7, 4–6
Win	8–7	Jun 2014	Rosmalen Open, Netherlands	International	Grass	(Spain) Arantxa Parra Santonja	(Netherlands) Michaëlla Krajicek (France) Kristina Mladenovic	0–6, 7–6^{(7–5)}, [10–8]
Loss	8–8	Aug 2014	Connecticut Open, US	Premier	Hard	(Spain) Arantxa Parra Santonja	(Spain) Sílvia Soler Espinosa (Slovenia) Andreja Klepač	5–7, 6–4, [7–10]

== ITF Circuit finals ==
Legend
$100,000 tournaments
$75,000 tournaments
$50,000 tournaments
$25,000 tournaments
$10,000 tournaments

=== Singles: 17 (12 titles, 5 runner-ups) ===
Result	W–L	Date	Tournament	Tier	Surface	Opponent	Score
Win	1–0	Mar 2005	ITF Warrnambool, Australia	10,000	Grass	(Australia) Daniella Dominikovic	6–3, 4–6, 6–4
Loss	1–1	Mar 2005	ITF Benalla, Australia	10,000	Grass	(China) Yuan Meng	4–6, 4–6
Win	2–1	Mar 2005	ITF Yarrawonga, Australia	10,000	Grass	(Australia) Emily Hewson	6–3, 4–6, 6–4
Win	3–1	Sep 2006	ITF Alphen aan den Rijn, Netherlands	25,000	Clay	(Germany) Andrea Petkovic	4–6, 6–2, 7–5
Win	4–1	Oct 2006	ITF Melbourne, Australia	25,000	Hard	(Australia) Casey Dellacqua	6–1, 0–6, 6–4
Win	5–1	Oct 2006	Beijing Challenger, China	50,000	Hard	(Russia) Alla Kudryavtseva	6–2, 6–1
Loss	5–2	Jul 2007	ITF La Coruña, Spain	25,000	Hard	(Portugal) Neuza Silva	6–0, 5–7, 3–6
Loss	5–3	Aug 2007	ITF Vigo, Spain	25,000	Hard	(France) Olivia Sanchez	w/o
Win	6–3	Oct 2007	ITF Rockhampton, Australia	25,000	Hard	(Australia) Sophie Ferguson	7–6^{(5)}, 7–5
Win	7–3	Oct 2007	ITF Gympie, Australia	25,000	Hard	(Australia) Sophie Ferguson	6–4, 6–3
Win	8–3	Feb 2008	ITF Mildura, Australia	25,000	Grass	(Chinese Taipei) Chang Kai-chen	6–3, 6–1
Loss	8–4	Feb 2008	ITF Berri, Australia	25,000	Grass	(Australia) Nicole Kriz	4–6, 6–4, 6–7^{(3)}
Win	9–4	Jun 2008	Surbiton Trophy, England	50,000	Grass	(United Kingdom) Anne Keothavong	6–4, 6–2
Win	10–4	Mar 2011	ITF Irapuato, Mexico	25,000	Hard	(Slovenia) Andreja Klepač	7–5, 6–4
Win	11–4	Mar 2011	ITF Pelham, United States	25,000	Clay	(Czech Republic) Renata Voráčová	6–4, 2–6, 6–1
Win	12–4	Apr 2011	ITF Jackson, United States	25,000	Clay	(Croatia) Ajla Tomljanović	6–1, 6–2
Loss	12–5	Mar 2014	ITF Osprey, United States	50,000	Clay	(Slovakia) Anna Schmiedlová	2–6, 3–6

=== Doubles: 11 (6 titles, 5 runner-ups) ===
Result	W–L	Date	Tournament	Tier	Surface	Partner	Opponents	Score
Loss	0–1	Oct 2006	Beijing Challenger, China	50,000	Hard	(United States) Raquel Kops-Jones	(China) Ji Chunmei (China) Sun Shengnan	2–6, 2–6
Win	1–1	Jun 2007	ITF Padova, Italy	25,000	Clay	(Estonia) Maret Ani	(Germany) Vanessa Henke (Germany) Andrea Petkovic	6–4, 6–4
Win	2–1	Jul 2007	ITF La Coruña, Spain	25,000	Hard	(United Kingdom) Melanie South	(Czech Republic) Andrea Hlaváčková (Germany) Justine Ozga	6–1, 4–6, 6–4
Win	3–1	Dec 2007	Dubai Tennis Challenge, UAE	75,000	Hard	(Romania) Monica Niculescu	(Ukraine) Yuliana Fedak (Russia) Anna Lapushchenkova	7–6^{(1)}, 6–4
Win	4–1	Feb 2008	ITF Mildura, Australia	25,000	Grass	(Australia) Nicole Kriz	(Australia) Monique Adamczak (Australia) Christina Wheeler	6–4, 6–4
Win	5–1	Feb 2008	ITF Berri, Australia	25,000	Grass	(Australia) Nicole Kriz	(Australia) Shannon Golds; (Australia) Emelyn Starr	2–6, 7–6^{(4)}, [10–3]
Win	6–1	Nov 2009	Toyota World Challenge, Japan	75,000	Carpet (i)	(Thailand) Tamarine Tanasugarn	(Japan) Akari Inoue (Japan) Akiko Yonemura	6–1, 6–4
Loss	6–2	Apr 2010	Soweto Open, South Africa	100,000	Hard	(Thailand) Tamarine Tanasugarn	(Russia) Vitalia Diatchenko (Greece) Eirini Georgatou	3–6, 7–5, [14–16]
Loss	6–3	May 2010	Fukuoka International, Japan	50,000	Grass	(Russia) Alexandra Panova	(Japan) Misaki Doi (Japan) Kotomi Takahata	4–6, 4–6
Loss	6–4	Jun 2017	Surbiton Trophy, England	100,000	Grass	(Chinese Taipei) Chang Kai-chen	(Australia) Monique Adamczak (Australia) Storm Sanders	5–7, 4–6
Loss	6–5	Jun 2017	Manchester Trophy, England	100,000	Grass	(Chinese Taipei) Chang Kai-chen	(Poland) Magdalena Fręch (Belgium) An-Sophie Mestach	4–6, 6–7^{(5)}

== Junior Grand Slam finals ==
=== Doubles: 4 (2 titles, 2 runner-ups) ===
Result	Year	Tournament	Surface	Partner	Opponents	Score
Loss	2004	Wimbledon	Grass	(Romania) Monica Niculescu	(Belarus) Victoria Azarenka (Belarus) Volha Havartsova	4–6, 6–3, 4–6
Win	2004	US Open	Hard	(Netherlands) Michaëlla Krajicek	(Romania) Monica Niculescu (Romania) Mădălina Gojnea	7–6^{(7–4)}, 6–0
Win	2005	Australian Open	Hard	(Belarus) Victoria Azarenka	(Czech Republic) Nikola Fraňková (Hungary) Ágnes Szávay	6–0, 6–2
Loss	2005	Wimbledon	Grass	(Romania) Monica Niculescu	(Belarus) Victoria Azarenka (Hungary) Ágnes Szávay	7–6^{(7–5)}, 2–6, 0–6
