= Rosie Cheng =

New Zealand tennis player

Rosie Cheng 罗西 程
- Country (sports): New Zealand
- Born: 1 August 1998 (age 27); Auckland, New Zealand
- Plays: Right (two-handed backhand)
- Prize money: $2,020

Singles
- Career record: 0–5
- Career titles: 0

Doubles
- Career record: 0–2
- Career titles: 0

Rosie Cheng (Chinese: 罗西 程; born 1 August 1998) is a New Zealand former tennis player of Chinese descent.

Cheng made her WTA Tour debut at the 2015 ASB Classic, having received a wildcard into the doubles tournament with Katherine Westbury. They faced Petra Martić and Anna Tatishvili in the first round, and subsequently lost 0–6, 2–6. Additionally, Cheng made the Auckland Chess team and also was in the Westlake Girls High School orchestra.
