= 2011 ASB Classic =

- Date: 3–8 January
- Edition: 26th
- Category: WTA International
- Surface: Hard
- Location: Auckland, New Zealand
- Venue: ASB Tennis Centre

Champions

Singles
- (Hungary) Gréta Arn

Doubles
- (Czech Republic) Květa Peschke / (Slovenia) Katarina Srebotnik
← 2010 ·	WTA Auckland Open	· 2012 →

The 2011 ASB Classic was a women's tennis tournament played on outdoor hard courts. It was the 26th edition of the ASB Classic, and was part of the WTA International tournaments of the 2011 WTA Tour. It took place at the ASB Tennis Centre in Auckland, New Zealand, from 3 January until 8 January 2011. Unseeded Gréta Arn won the singles title.

== Finals ==
=== Singles ===
(Hungary) Gréta Arn defeated (Belgium) Yanina Wickmayer, 6–3, 6–3

- It was Arn's 1st title of the year and the 2nd of her career.

=== Doubles ===
(Czech Republic) Květa Peschke / (Slovenia) Katarina Srebotnik defeated (Sweden) Sofia Arvidsson / (New Zealand) Marina Erakovic, 6–3, 6–0

== Singles entrants ==
=== Seeds ===
Country	Player	Rank^{1}	Seed
RUS	Maria Sharapova	18	1
BEL	Yanina Wickmayer	23	2
RUS	Svetlana Kuznetsova	27	3
GER	Julia Görges	40	4
LAT	~~Anastasija Sevastova~~	~~45~~	~~5~~
JPN	Kimiko Date-Krumm	51	6
RUS	Elena Vesnina	52	7
SWE	Sofia Arvidsson	53	8
ESP	Carla Suárez Navarro	57	9

- Rankings as of 27 December 2010.

=== Other entrants ===
The following players received wildcards into the singles main draw:

- (Ukraine) Kateryna Bondarenko
- (New Zealand) Marina Erakovic
- (New Zealand) Sacha Jones

The following players received entry from the qualifying draw:

- (Thailand) Noppawan Lertcheewakarn
- (Germany) Sabine Lisicki
- (Argentina) Florencia Molinero
- (United Kingdom) Heather Watson

The following player received the lucky loser spot:

- (Italy) Alberta Brianti

The following pairs received wildcards into the doubles main draw:

- (New Zealand) Leela Beattie / (New Zealand) Emily Fanning

== See also ==
- 2011 Heineken Open – men's tournament
