= 2012 ASB Classic =

- Date: 2–8 January
- Edition: 27th
- Draw: 32S / 16D
- Prize money: $220,000
- Surface: Hard / outdoor
- Location: Auckland, New Zealand
- Venue: ASB Tennis Centre

Champions

Singles
- (China) Zheng Jie

Doubles
- (Czech Republic) Andrea Hlaváčková / (Czech Republic) Lucie Hradecká
← 2011 ·	WTA Auckland Open	· 2013 →

The 2012 ASB Classic was a women's tennis tournament played on outdoor hard courts. It was the 27th edition of the ASB Classic, and was part of the WTA International tournaments of the 2012 WTA Tour. It took place at the ASB Tennis Centre in Auckland, New Zealand, from 2 January until 8 January 2012. Unseeded Zheng Jie won the singles title.

== Finals ==
=== Singles ===
(China) Zheng Jie defeated (Italy) Flavia Pennetta, 2–6, 6–3, 2–0 retired

- It was Zheng's 1st title of the year and 4th of her career.

=== Doubles ===
(Czech Republic) Andrea Hlaváčková / (Czech Republic) Lucie Hradecká defeated (Germany) Julia Görges / (Italy) Flavia Pennetta 6–7^{(2–7)}, 6–2, [10–7]

== Singles main-draw entrants ==
=== Seeds ===
Country	Player	Rank	Seed
GER	Sabine Lisicki	15	1
CHN	Peng Shuai	17	2
RUS	Svetlana Kuznetsova	19	3
ITA	Flavia Pennetta	20	4
GER	Julia Görges	21	5
ITA	Roberta Vinci	23	6
BEL	Yanina Wickmayer	26	7
ROU	Monica Niculescu	30	8

- ^{1} Rankings as of 26 December 2011

=== Other entrants ===
The following players received wildcards into the singles main draw:

- (New Zealand) Sacha Jones
- (France) Virginie Razzano
- (Slovakia) Magdaléna Rybáriková

The following players received entry from the qualifying draw:

- (United States) Jamie Hampton
- (France) Aravane Rezaï
- (United States) Alison Riske
- (Czech Republic) Karolína Plíšková

=== Withdrawals ===
- (United States) Venus Williams (Sjögren's syndrome disease)

=== Retirements ===
- (Germany) Sabine Lisicki (left abdominal muscle injury)
- (Italy) Flavia Pennetta (back injury)

== Doubles main-draw entrants ==
=== Seeds ===
Country	Player	Country	Player	Rank^{1}	Seed
CZE	Květa Peschke	SLO	Katarina Srebotnik	4	1
IND	Sania Mirza	RUS	Elena Vesnina	21	2
CZE	Andrea Hlaváčková	CZE	Lucie Hradecká	29	3
GER	Julia Görges	ITA	Flavia Pennetta	48	4

- ^{1} Rankings are as of 26 December 2011

=== Other entrants ===
The following pairs received wildcards into the doubles main draw:

- (New Zealand) Marina Erakovic / (Canada) Rebecca Marino
- (New Zealand) Emily Fanning / (Russia) Regina Kulikova

=== Withdrawals ===
- (Germany) Sabine Lisicki (left abdominal muscle injury)

== Finals ==
=== Singles ===
(China) Zheng Jie defeated (Italy) Flavia Pennetta, 2–6, 6–3, 2–0 retired

- It was Zheng's 1st title of the year and 4th of her career.

=== Doubles ===
(Czech Republic) Andrea Hlaváčková / (Czech Republic) Lucie Hradecká defeated (Germany) Julia Görges / (Italy) Flavia Pennetta 6–7^{(2–7)}, 6–2, [10–7]

== See also ==
- 2012 Heineken Open – men's tournament
