= 2010 ASB Classic – Doubles =

Doubles
- 2010 ASB Classic

Final
- Champions: (Zimbabwe) Cara Black (United States) Liezel Huber
- Runners-up: (South Africa) Natalie Grandin (United States) Laura Granville
- Score: 7–6^{(7–4)}, 6–2

Details
- Draw: 16
- Seeds: 4

Events
Singles	Doubles
← 2009 ·	WTA Auckland Open	· 2011 →

Nathalie Dechy and Mara Santangelo were the defending champions, but Dechy retired from tennis before being able to defend the title, and Santangelo chose not to participate this year.

In the final, Cara Black and Liezel Huber defeated Natalie Grandin and Laura Granville, 7–6^{(7–4)}, 6–2.

== Seeds ==
1. (Zimbabwe) Cara Black / (United States) Liezel Huber (champions)
2. (India) Sania Mirza / (Spain) Virginia Ruano Pascual (first round)
3. (Italy) Flavia Pennetta / (Italy) Francesca Schiavone (semifinals)
4. (Russia) Elena Vesnina / (United States) Riza Zalameda (quarterfinals)

== Draw ==
=== Key ===
- Q = Qualifier
- WC = Wild card
- LL = Lucky loser
- Alt = Alternate
- SE = Special exempt
- PR = Protected ranking
- ITF = ITF entry
- JE = Junior exempt
- w/o = Walkover
- r = Retired
- d = Defaulted
- SR = Special ranking

=== Draw ===
First round
1	(Zimbabwe) C Black (United States) L Huber	6	7^{8}
WC	(New Zealand) M Erakovic (Slovenia) P Hercog	3	6^{6}
(Romania) M Niculescu (Romania) IR Olaru	7	7
(Spain) A Medina Garrigues (Spain) C Suárez Navarro	5	5
3	(Italy) F Pennetta (Italy) F Schiavone	7	2	[10]
(Romania) E Gallovits (Israel) S Pe'er	5	6	[3]
(Germany) J Görges (Germany) T Malek	6	2	[8]
(United Kingdom) S Borwell (United States) R Kops-Jones	4	6	[10]
(France) J Coin (Canada) M-È Pelletier	6	3	[4]
(Czech Republic) V Uhlířová (Czech Republic) R Voráčová	4	6	[10]
(United States) J Craybas (United States) A Spears	5	6	[10]
4	(Russia) E Vesnina (United States) R Zalameda	7	3	[12]
(South Africa) N Grandin (United States) L Granville	6	6
(Germany) K Barrois (Russia) M Kondratieva	3	2
WC	(Slovakia) D Cibulková (Belgium) Y Wickmayer	6	7^{8}
2	(India) S Mirza (Spain) V Ruano Pascual	1	6^{6}

Quarterfinals
1	(Zimbabwe) C Black (United States) L Huber	6	6
(Romania) M Niculescu (Romania) IR Olaru	3	2
3	(Italy) F Pennetta (Italy) F Schiavone	7^{7}	6
(United Kingdom) S Borwell (United States) R Kops-Jones	6^{5}	4
(Czech Republic) V Uhlířová (Czech Republic) R Voráčová	7^{15}	3	[16]
4	(Russia) E Vesnina (United States) R Zalameda	6^{13}	6	[14]
(South Africa) N Grandin (United States) L Granville	6	6
WC	(Slovakia) D Cibulková (Belgium) Y Wickmayer	3	1

Semifinals
1	(Zimbabwe) C Black (United States) L Huber	6	5	[10]
3	(Italy) F Pennetta (Italy) F Schiavone	1	7	[8]
(Czech Republic) V Uhlířová (Czech Republic) R Voráčová	2	6	[8]
(South Africa) N Grandin (United States) L Granville	6	3	[10]

Finals
1	(Zimbabwe) C Black (United States) L Huber	7^{7}	6
(South Africa) N Grandin (United States) L Granville	6^{4}	2
