= 2012 ASB Classic – Doubles =

Doubles
- 2012 ASB Classic

Final
- Champions: (Czech Republic) Andrea Hlaváčková (Czech Republic) Lucie Hradecká
- Runners-up: (Germany) Julia Görges (Italy) Flavia Pennetta
- Score: 6–7^{(2–7)}, 6–2, [10–7]

Details
- Draw: 16
- Seeds: 4

Events
Singles	Doubles
← 2011 ·	WTA Auckland Open	· 2013 →

Květa Peschke and Katarina Srebotnik were the defending champions but were defeated in the semifinals by Andrea Hlaváčková and Lucie Hradecká.

Hlaváčková and Hradecká went on to win the title, defeating Julia Görges and Flavia Pennetta in the final, 6–7^{(2–7)}, 6–2, [10–7].

== Seeds ==
1. (Czech Republic) Květa Peschke / (Slovenia) Katarina Srebotnik (semifinals)
2. (India) Sania Mirza / (Russia) Elena Vesnina (semifinals)
3. (Czech Republic) Andrea Hlaváčková / (Czech Republic) Lucie Hradecká (champions)
4. (Germany) Julia Görges / (Italy) Flavia Pennetta (final)

== Draw ==
=== Key ===
- Q = Qualifier
- WC = Wild card
- LL = Lucky loser
- Alt = Alternate
- SE = Special exempt
- PR = Protected ranking
- ITF = ITF entry
- JE = Junior exempt
- w/o = Walkover
- r = Retired
- d = Defaulted
- SR = Special ranking

First round
1	(Czech Republic) K Peschke (Slovenia) K Srebotnik	6	6
(Latvia) L Dekmeijere (United States) M Moulton-Levy	4	1
(United States) J Hampton (Germany) J Wöhr	6	6
(Czech Republic) E Birnerová (Italy) A Brianti	1	3
3	(Czech Republic) A Hlaváčková (Czech Republic) L Hradecká	6	6
(Sweden) S Arvidsson (Sweden) J Larsson	1	4
(Romania) S Cîrstea (Croatia) D Jurak	3	1
(Germany) K Barrois (Germany) A-L Grönefeld	6	6
(France) A Cornet (Romania) M Niculescu	6	6
(Romania) E Bogdan (Romania) A Dulgheru	3	4
WC	(New Zealand) E Fanning (Russia) R Kulikova	2	3
4	(Germany) J Görges (Italy) F Pennetta	6	6
(Italy) S Errani (Italy) R Vinci	2	3
(Germany) S Lisicki (China) S Peng	6	6
WC	(New Zealand) M Erakovic (Canada) R Marino	4	5
2	(India) S Mirza (Russia) E Vesnina	6	7

Quarterfinals
1	(Czech Republic) K Peschke (Slovenia) K Srebotnik	6	6
(United States) J Hampton (Germany) J Wöhr	3	4
3	(Czech Republic) A Hlaváčková (Czech Republic) L Hradecká	7	6
(Germany) K Barrois (Germany) A-L Grönefeld	5	4
(France) A Cornet (Romania) M Niculescu	6	5	[8]
4	(Germany) J Görges (Italy) F Pennetta	4	7	[10]
(Germany) S Lisicki (China) S Peng
2	(India) S Mirza (Russia) E Vesnina	w/o

Semifinals
1	(Czech Republic) K Peschke (Slovenia) K Srebotnik	4	0
3	(Czech Republic) A Hlaváčková (Czech Republic) L Hradecká	6	6
4	(Germany) J Görges (Italy) F Pennetta	2	7^{7}	[11]
2	(India) S Mirza (Russia) E Vesnina	6	6^{2}	[9]

Final
3	(Czech Republic) A Hlaváčková (Czech Republic) L Hradecká	6^{2}	6	[10]
4	(Germany) J Görges (Italy) F Pennetta	7^{7}	2	[7]
