= 2011 ASB Classic – Singles =

Singles
- 2011 ASB Classic

Final
- Champion: (Hungary) Gréta Arn
- Runner-up: (Belgium) Yanina Wickmayer
- Score: 6–3, 6–3

Details
- Draw: 32 (4 Q / 3 WC )
- Seeds: 9

Events
Singles	Doubles
← 2010 ·	ASB Classic	· 2012 →

Gréta Arn defeated defending champion Yanina Wickmayer 6–3, 6–3 in the final to win her second career title.

== Seeds ==
1. (Russia) Maria Sharapova (quarterfinals)
2. (Belgium) Yanina Wickmayer (final)
3. (Russia) Svetlana Kuznetsova (second round)
4. (Germany) Julia Görges (semifinals)
5. (Latvia) Anastasija Sevastova (withdrew due to a chest infection)
6. (Japan) Kimiko Date-Krumm (first round)
7. (Russia) Elena Vesnina (second round, retired)
8. (Sweden) Sofia Arvidsson (second round)
9. (Spain) Carla Suárez Navarro (second round)

== Draw ==
=== Key ===
- Q = Qualifier
- WC = Wild card
- LL = Lucky loser
- Alt = Alternate
- ITF = ITF entry
- PR = Protected ranking
- SR = Special ranking
- SE = Special exempt
- JE = Junior exempt
- JR = Junior Accelerator Programme entrant
- CO = College Accelerator Programme entrant
- NG = Next Gen Accelerator Program entrant
- w/o = Walkover
- r = Retired
- d = Defaulted

=== Finals ===
Semifinals
(Hungary) Gréta Arn	7	6
4	(Germany) Julia Görges	6^{3}	3
(China) Peng Shuai	6	6^{3}	5
2	(Belgium) Yanina Wickmayer	3	7	7

Final
(Hungary) Gréta Arn	6	6
2	(Belgium) Yanina Wickmayer	3	3

=== Top half ===
First round
1	(Russia) M Sharapova	6	6
LL	(Italy) A Brianti	2	3
(Spain) L Domínguez Lino	6	6^{8}	0
(Czech Republic) R Voráčová	4	7	6
(Czech Republic) Z Ondrášková	1	0
(Hungary) G Arn	6	6
(Austria) T Paszek	3	1
8	(Sweden) S Arvidsson	6	6
4	(Germany) J Görges	6	6
(Spain) A Medina Garrigues	4	0
(Czech Republic) S Záhlavová	6	5	0
(France) A Cornet	3	7	6
PR	(United Kingdom) A Keothavong	6^{4}	6	6
(Romania) E Gallovits-Hall	7	4	0
WC	(Ukraine) K Bondarenko	6	6
6	(Japan) K Date-Krumm	4	3

Second round
1	(Russia) M Sharapova	6	7
(Czech Republic) R Voráčová	3	5
(Hungary) G Arn	4	7	7
8	(Sweden) S Arvidsson	6	5	5
4	(Germany) J Görges	6	6
(France) A Cornet	2	4
PR	(United Kingdom) A Keothavong	5	3
WC	(Ukraine) K Bondarenko	7	6

Quarter Finals
1	(Russia) M Sharapova	2	5
(Hungary) G Arn	6	7
4	(Germany) J Görges	5	6	6
WC	(Ukraine) K Bondarenko	7	2	2

Semi Final
(Hungary) G Arn	7	6
4	(Germany) J Görges	6^{3}	3

=== Bottom half ===
First round
9	(Spain) C Suárez Navarro	6	7
(Italy) R Oprandi	3	6^{7}
Q	(United Kingdom) H Watson	6	6
Q	(Thailand) N Lertcheewakarn	1	1
(Sweden) J Larsson	1	3
(China) S Peng	6	6
WC	(New Zealand) S Jones	4	2
3	(Russia) S Kuznetsova	6	6
7	(Russia) E Vesnina	6	6
WC	(New Zealand) M Erakovic	2	2
(Romania) S Halep	6	7
(Japan) A Morita	0	6^{3}
Q	(Germany) S Lisicki	6	6
Q	(Argentina) F Molinero	1	3
(Russia) D Safina	3	7	1
2	(Belgium) Y Wickmayer	6	6^{2}	6

Second round
9	(Spain) C Suárez Navarro	6^{5}	1
Q	(United Kingdom) H Watson	7	6
(China) S Peng	2	6	6
3	(Russia) S Kuznetsova	6	4	4
7	(Russia) E Vesnina	6	4	0^{r}
(Romania) S Halep	2	6	4
Q	(Germany) S Lisicki	2	6	2
2	(Belgium) Y Wickmayer	6	3	6

Quarter Finals
Q	(United Kingdom) H Watson	4	5
(China) S Peng	6	7
(Romania) S Halep	0	2
2	(Belgium) Y Wickmayer	6	6

Semi Final
(China) S Peng	6	6^{3}	5
2	(Belgium) Y Wickmayer	3	7	7

== Qualifying ==
=== Seeds ===
1. (Italy) Alberta Brianti (qualifying competition, lucky loser)
2. (Croatia) Mirjana Lučić (second round)
3. (United States) Jill Craybas (second round)
4. (Japan) Junri Namigata (second round)
5. (France) Olivia Sanchez (second round, Retired)
6. (Japan) Kurumi Nara (second round)
7. (United States) Jamie Hampton (first round)
8. (Switzerland) Stefanie Vögele (first round)

=== Qualifiers ===
1. (United Kingdom) Heather Watson
2. (Germany) Sabine Lisicki
3. (Argentina) Florencia Molinero
4. (Thailand) Noppawan Lertcheewakarn

=== Lucky losers ===
1. (Italy) Alberta Brianti

=== Qualifying draw ===
==== First qualifier ====
First round
1	(Italy) Alberta Brianti	4	6	6
(Luxembourg) Mandy Minella	6	1	1
(Russia) Elena Bovina	6	6
(Japan) Aiko Nakamura	4	0
(Italy) Corinna Dentoni	6	6
WC	(New Zealand) Leela Beattie	2	4
(United Kingdom) Heather Watson	6	6
7	(United States) Jamie Hampton	1	2

Second round
1	(Italy) Alberta Brianti	6	6
(Russia) Elena Bovina	2	4
(Italy) Corinna Dentoni	5	4
(United Kingdom) Heather Watson	7	6

Qualifying competition
1	(Italy) Alberta Brianti	3	2
(United Kingdom) Heather Watson	6	6

==== Second qualifier ====
First round
2	(Croatia) Mirjana Lučić	6	6
(Argentina) María Irigoyen	1	4
(Canada) Stéphanie Dubois	6	4	0
(Germany) Sabine Lisicki	4	6	6
(Spain) Silvia Soler Espinosa	6	7
(Luxembourg) Anne Kremer	2	5
(India) Sania Mirza	6	6
8	(Switzerland) Stefanie Vögele	4	0

Second round
2	(Croatia) Mirjana Lučić	3	4
(Germany) Sabine Lisicki	6	6
(Spain) Silvia Soler Espinosa	2	2
(India) Sania Mirza	6	6

Qualifying competition
(Germany) Sabine Lisicki	6	6^{7}	7
(India) Sania Mirza	1	7	6^{5}

==== Third qualifier ====
First round
3	(United States) Jill Craybas	4	6	6
WC	(New Zealand) Katherine Westbury	6	4	0
WC	(Czech Republic) Vladimíra Uhlířová	4	4
(Germany) Anna-Lena Grönefeld	6	6
(Argentina) Florencia Molinero	6	6
(Czech Republic) Eva Birnerová	3	1
(Romania) Liana Ungur	1	2
5	(France) Olivia Sanchez	6	6

Second round
3	(United States) Jill Craybas	0	6	5
(Germany) Anna-Lena Grönefeld	6	1	7
(Argentina) Florencia Molinero	5
5	(France) Olivia Sanchez	0^{r}

Qualifying competition
(Germany) Anna-Lena Grönefeld	6	5	3
(Argentina) Florencia Molinero	1	7	6

==== Fourth qualifier ====
First round
4	(Japan) Junri Namigata	1	6	6
(United States) Sloane Stephens	6	2	4
(United Kingdom) Katie O'Brien	6	6
WC	(New Zealand) Emily Fanning	2	2
(Latvia) Līga Dekmeijere	6^{6}	1
(Thailand) Noppawan Lertcheewakarn	7	6
(South Africa) Natalie Grandin	3	1
6	(Japan) Kurumi Nara	6	6

Second round
4	(Japan) Junri Namigata	5	3
(United Kingdom) Katie O'Brien	7	6
(Thailand) Noppawan Lertcheewakarn	4	7	7
6	(Japan) Kurumi Nara	6	6^{8}	5

Qualifying competition
(United Kingdom) Katie O'Brien	0	3
(Thailand) Noppawan Lertcheewakarn	6	6
