= 2012 ASB Classic – Singles =

Singles
- 2012 ASB Classic

Final
- Champion: (China) Zheng Jie
- Runner-up: (Italy) Flavia Pennetta
- Score: 2–6, 6–3, 2–0 ret.

Details
- Draw: 32 (4 Q / 3 WC )
- Seeds: 8

Events
Singles	Doubles
← 2011 ·	ASB Classic	· 2013 →

Gréta Arn was the defending champion, but lost to Julia Görges in the first round.

Unseeded Zheng Jie won the tournament, after her opponent Flavia Pennetta retired in the final.

== Seeds ==
1. (Germany) Sabine Lisicki (quarterfinals, retired due to left abdominal muscle injury)
2. (China) Peng Shuai (second round)
3. (Russia) Svetlana Kuznetsova (semifinals)
4. (Italy) Flavia Pennetta (final, retired due to a back injury)
5. (Germany) Julia Görges (second round)
6. (Italy) Roberta Vinci (second round)
7. (Belgium) Yanina Wickmayer (second round)
8. (Romania) Monica Niculescu (second round)

== Draw ==
=== Key ===
- Q = Qualifier
- WC = Wild card
- LL = Lucky loser
- Alt = Alternate
- ITF = ITF entry
- PR = Protected ranking
- SR = Special ranking
- SE = Special exempt
- JE = Junior exempt
- JR = Junior Accelerator Programme entrant
- CO = College Accelerator Programme entrant
- NG = Next Gen Accelerator Program entrant
- w/o = Walkover
- r = Retired
- d = Defaulted

=== Finals ===
Semifinals
(Germany) Angelique Kerber	1	2
4	(Italy) Flavia Pennetta	6	6
3	(Russia) Svetlana Kuznetsova	6	3	3
(China) Zheng Jie	2	6	6

Final
4	(Italy) Flavia Pennetta	6	3	0^{r}
(China) Zheng Jie	2	6	2

=== Top half ===
First round
1	(Germany) S Lisicki	6	6
WC	(France) V Razzano	4	4
(Germany) M Barthel	7^{7}	6
(Australia) J Dokić	6^{5}	1
(New Zealand) M Erakovic	6	4	4
(Germany) A Kerber	4	6	6
(Hungary) G Arn	5	6	4
5	(Germany) J Görges	7	3	6
4	(Italy) F Pennetta	6	7^{7}
(Romania) S Cîrstea	4	6^{5}
WC	(New Zealand) S Jones	2	6	3
(United Kingdom) E Baltacha	6	4	6
WC	(Slovakia) M Rybáriková	3	2
(Russia) E Vesnina	6	6
(Canada) R Marino	5	4
6	(Italy) R Vinci	7	6

Second round
1	(Germany) S Lisicki	7^{7}	3	6
(Germany) M Barthel	6^{3}	6	3
(Germany) A Kerber	6	6
5	(Germany) J Görges	2	3
4	(Italy) F Pennetta	6	6
(United Kingdom) E Baltacha	4	2
(Russia) E Vesnina	6	6
6	(Italy) R Vinci	3	4

Quarterfinals
1	(Germany) S Lisicki	4	3^{r}
(Germany) A Kerber	6	4
4	(Italy) F Pennetta	6	6
(Russia) E Vesnina	2	1

Semifinals
(Germany) A Kerber	1	2
4	(Italy) F Pennetta	6	6

=== Bottom half ===
First round
7	(Belgium) Y Wickmayer	6	6
Q	(Czech Republic) Ka Plíšková	3	4
(Sweden) J Larsson	1	1
(Italy) S Errani	6	6
(United States) C McHale	6	6
(Romania) A Dulgheru	2	3
Q	(United States) A Riske	3	2
3	(Russia) S Kuznetsova	6	6
8	(Romania) M Niculescu	7^{7}	6
Q	(United States) J Hampton	6^{1}	1
(China) J Zheng	4	6	6
(Japan) A Morita	6	3	4
(Czech Republic) L Hradecká	6	3	6
(Italy) A Brianti	4	6	2
Q	(France) A Rezaï	6	3	4
2	(China) S Peng	4	6	6

Second round
7	(Belgium) Y Wickmayer	6	1	1
(Italy) S Errani	4	6	6
(United States) C McHale	1	1
3	(Russia) S Kuznetsova	6	6
8	(Romania) M Niculescu	0	2
(China) J Zheng	6	6
(Czech Republic) L Hradecká	6	6
2	(China) S Peng	4	3

Quarterfinals
(Italy) S Errani	4	3
3	(Russia) S Kuznetsova	6	6
(China) J Zheng	6	6
(Czech Republic) L Hradecká	2	3

Semifinals
3	(Russia) S Kuznetsova	6	3	3
(China) J Zheng	2	6	6

== Qualifying ==
=== Seeds ===
1. (United Kingdom) Anne Keothavong (qualifying competition)
2. (France) Pauline Parmentier (second round)
3. (France) Mathilde Johansson (first round)
4. (Sweden) Sofia Arvidsson (second round)
5. (Italy) Romina Oprandi (second round)
6. (United States) Irina Falconi (second round)
7. (France) Alizé Cornet (first round)
8. (Germany) Kristina Barrois (first round)

=== Qualifiers ===
1. (United States) Jamie Hampton
2. (France) Aravane Rezaï
3. (United States) Alison Riske
4. (Czech Republic) Karolína Plíšková

=== Qualifying draw ===
==== First qualifier ====
First round
1	(United Kingdom) Anne Keothavong	6	6
WC	(New Zealand) Emily Fanning	3	4
(United States) Varvara Lepchenko	6	7
WC	(Slovenia) Petra Rampre	2	5
(United States) Jamie Hampton	7	6
(Czech Republic) Andrea Hlaváčková	5	3
(Canada) Aleksandra Wozniak	1	4
6	(United States) Irina Falconi	6	6

Second round
1	(United Kingdom) Anne Keothavong	6	6
(United States) Varvara Lepchenko	3	3
(United States) Jamie Hampton	6	6
6	(United States) Irina Falconi	4	2

Qualifying competition
1	(United Kingdom) Anne Keothavong	1	4
(United States) Jamie Hampton	6	6

==== Second qualifier ====
First round
2	(France) Pauline Parmentier	6	0
(Canada) Sharon Fichman	2	0^{r}
(Thailand) Noppawan Lertcheewakarn	4	6	3
(France) Aravane Rezaï	6	1	6
(India) Sania Mirza	6	5	3
(United States) Coco Vandeweghe	1	7	6
(Bulgaria) Dia Evtimova	4	1
5	(Italy) Romina Oprandi	6	6

Second round
2	(France) Pauline Parmentier	4	4
(France) Aravane Rezaï	6	6
(United States) Coco Vandeweghe	7	6
5	(Italy) Romina Oprandi	5	2

Qualifying competition
(France) Aravane Rezaï	6	6
(United States) Coco Vandeweghe	4	4

==== Third qualifier ====
First round
3	(France) Mathilde Johansson	2	7^{7}	1
(Russia) Regina Kulikova	6	6^{3}	6
(France) Iryna Brémond	6^{4}	4
(Czech Republic) Kristýna Plíšková	7^{7}	6
(Japan) Erika Sema	4	7^{11}	0
(United States) Alison Riske	6	6^{9}	6
(Japan) Kurumi Nara	6	6
8	(Germany) Kristina Barrois	4	1

Second round
(Russia) Regina Kulikova	7^{10}	6
(Czech Republic) Kristýna Plíšková	6^{8}	1
(United States) Alison Riske	6	6
(Japan) Kurumi Nara	3	1

Qualifying competition
(Russia) Regina Kulikova	2	7^{7}	2
(United States) Alison Riske	6	6^{3}	6

==== Fourth qualifier ====
First round
4	(Sweden) Sofia Arvidsson	6	6
(Czech Republic) Eva Birnerová	0	2
(Netherlands) Bibiane Schoofs	6	6^{4}	3
WC	(Puerto Rico) Monica Puig	2	7^{7}	6
(United States) Jill Craybas	6^{4}	0
(Czech Republic) Karolína Plíšková	7^{7}	6
WC	(France) Claire Feuerstein	6	6
7	(France) Alizé Cornet	1	4

Second round
4	(Sweden) Sofia Arvidsson	3	1
WC	(Puerto Rico) Monica Puig	6	6
(Czech Republic) Karolína Plíšková	6	6
WC	(France) Claire Feuerstein	2	3

Qualifying competition
WC	(Puerto Rico) Monica Puig	3	3
(Czech Republic) Karolína Plíšková	6	6
