= 2011 ASB Classic – Doubles =

Doubles
- 2011 ASB Classic

Final
- Champions: (Czech Republic) Kveta Peschke (Slovenia) Katarina Srebotnik
- Runners-up: (New Zealand) Marina Erakovic (Sweden) Sofia Arvidsson
- Score: 6–3, 6–0

Details
- Draw: 16
- Seeds: 4

Events
Singles	Doubles
← 2010 ·	WTA Auckland Open	· 2012 →

Cara Black and Liezel Huber were the defending champions after defeating Natalie Grandin and Laura Granville in the 2010 final. However they did not defend the title together after splitting halfway through the 2010 season.

Květa Peschke and Katarina Srebotnik won in the final against Sofia Arvidsson and Marina Erakovic, 6–3, 6–0.

== Seeds ==
1. (Czech Republic) Květa Peschke / (Slovenia) Katarina Srebotnik (champions)
2. (South Africa) Natalie Grandin / (Czech Republic) Vladimíra Uhlířová (quarterfinals)
3. (India) Sania Mirza / (Czech Republic) Renata Voráčová (semifinals)
4. (Latvia) Līga Dekmeijere / (Germany) Anna-Lena Grönefeld (quarterfinals)

== Draw ==
=== Key ===
- Q = Qualifier
- WC = Wild card
- LL = Lucky loser
- Alt = Alternate
- SE = Special exempt
- PR = Protected ranking
- ITF = ITF entry
- JE = Junior exempt
- w/o = Walkover
- r = Retired
- d = Defaulted
- SR = Special ranking

=== Draw ===
First round
1	(Czech Republic) K Peschke (Slovenia) K Srebotnik	6	6
(Thailand) N Lertcheewakarn (Japan) A Nakamura	3	2
(Argentina) M Irigoyen (Argentina) F Molinero	6^{8}	4
(Japan) K Nara (United Kingdom) H Watson	7	6
3	(India) S Mirza (Czech Republic) R Voracova	6	6
(United Kingdom) S Borwell (Canada) M-È Pelletier	3	4
WC	(New Zealand) L Beattie (New Zealand) E Fanning	3	2
(Sweden) J Larsson (Germany) J Wöhr	6	6
(Spain) L Domínguez Lino (Spain) S Soler Espinosa	4	5
(France) A Cornet (Romania) E Gallovits-Hall	6	7
(Czech Republic) E Birnerová (United Kingdom) A Keothavong	5	6	[8]
4	(Latvia) L Dekmeijere (Germany) A-L Grönefeld	7	4	[10]
(Sweden) S Arvidsson (New Zealand) M Erakovic	6	6
(Romania) S Halep (Austria) T Paszek	2	1
(Italy) C Dentoni (Romania) L Ungur	3	4
2	(South Africa) N Grandin (Czech Republic) V Uhlířová	6	6

Quarterfinals
1	(Czech Republic) K Peschke (Slovenia) K Srebotnik	6	6
(Japan) K Nara (United Kingdom) H Watson	2	1
3	(India) S Mirza (Czech Republic) R Voracova	6	7
(Sweden) J Larsson (Germany) J Wöhr	2	6^{4}
(France) A Cornet (Romania) E Gallovits-Hall	6	6
4	(Latvia) L Dekmeijere (Germany) A-L Grönefeld	4	2
(Sweden) S Arvidsson (New Zealand) M Erakovic	7	6
2	(South Africa) N Grandin (Czech Republic) V Uhlířová	6^{6}	3

Semifinals
1	(Czech Republic) K Peschke (Slovenia) K Srebotnik	6	6
3	(India) S Mirza (Czech Republic) R Voracova	1	1
(France) A Cornet (Romania) E Gallovits-Hall	3	1
(Sweden) S Arvidsson (New Zealand) M Erakovic	6	6

Final
1	(Czech Republic) K Peschke (Slovenia) K Srebotnik	6	6
(Sweden) S Arvidsson (New Zealand) M Erakovic	3	0
