= 2010 ASB Classic – Singles =

Singles
- 2010 ASB Classic

Final
- Champion: (Belgium) Yanina Wickmayer
- Runner-up: (Italy) Flavia Pennetta
- Score: 6–3, 6–2

Details
- Draw: 32 (4 Q / 3 WC )
- Seeds: 8

Events
Singles	Doubles
← 2009 ·	ASB Classic	· 2011 →

Elena Dementieva was the defending champion, but chose not to participate this year.

In the final, Yanina Wickmayer defeated Flavia Pennetta, 6–3, 6–2.

== Seeds ==
1. (Italy) Flavia Pennetta (final)
2. (China) Li Na (first round)
3. (Belgium) Yanina Wickmayer (champion)
4. (Italy) Francesca Schiavone (semifinals)
5. (France) Virginie Razzano (second round)
6. (Russia) Elena Vesnina (second round)
7. (France) Aravane Rezaï (second round)
8. (Spain) Anabel Medina Garrigues (first round)

== Draw ==
=== Key ===
- Q = Qualifier
- WC = Wild card
- LL = Lucky loser
- Alt = Alternate
- ITF = ITF entry
- PR = Protected ranking
- SR = Special ranking
- SE = Special exempt
- JE = Junior exempt
- JR = Junior Accelerator Programme entrant
- CO = College Accelerator Programme entrant
- NG = Next Gen Accelerator Program entrant
- w/o = Walkover
- r = Retired
- d = Defaulted

=== Finals ===
Semifinals
1	(Italy) Flavia Pennetta	6	6
4	(Italy) Francesca Schiavone	3	0
3/WC	(Belgium) Yanina Wickmayer	6	7
(Israel) Shahar Pe'er	4	5

Final
1	(Italy) Flavia Pennetta	3	2
3/WC	(Belgium) Yanina Wickmayer	6	6

=== Top half ===
First round
1	(Italy) F Pennetta	6	6
(United States) J Craybas	2	4
(Spain) C Suárez Navarro	6	7
Q	(Romania) E Gallovits	4	5
(Romania) A Dulgheru	0	3
(Slovakia) D Cibulková	6	6
(France) J Coin	4	3
7	(France) A Rezaï	6	6
4	(Italy) F Schiavone	6	6
Q	(France) S Cohen-Aloro	2	3
(Switzerland) S Vögele	7	1	5
(India) S Mirza	5	6	7
(France) A Cornet	6	6
WC	(New Zealand) M Erakovic	4	3
(Italy) A Brianti	1	4
6	(Russia) E Vesnina	6	6

Second round
1	(Italy) F Pennetta	6	6
(Spain) C Suárez Navarro	2	2
(Slovakia) D Cibulková	6	6
7	(France) A Rezaï	3	4
4	(Italy) F Schiavone	6	6
(India) S Mirza	0	3
(France) A Cornet	6	6
6	(Russia) E Vesnina	1	1

Quarterfinals
1	(Italy) F Pennetta	6	6
(Slovakia) D Cibulková	1	2
4	(Italy) F Schiavone	6	6
(France) A Cornet	2	3

Semifinals
1	(Italy) F Pennetta	6	6
4	(Italy) F Schiavone	3	0

=== Bottom half ===
First round
5	(France) V Razzano	7	6
Q	(Romania) M Niculescu	5	4
(Russia) A Chakvetadze	1	2
WC	(Japan) K Date-Krumm	6	6
(Romania) IR Olaru	6	6
Q	(United Kingdom) E Baltacha	2	2
(Germany) J Görges	3	5
3/WC	(Belgium) Y Wickmayer	6	7
8	(Spain) A Medina Garrigues	2	3
(Slovakia) M Rybáriková	6	6
(Israel) S Pe'er	7	6
(Slovenia) P Hercog	5	3
(Germany) T Malek	2	3
(Russia) M Kirilenko	6	6
(Estonia) K Kanepi	6	6
2	(China) N Li	1	3

Second round
5	(France) V Razzano	6	3	2
WC	(Japan) K Date-Krumm	3	6	6
(Romania) IR Olaru	2	2
3/WC	(Belgium) Y Wickmayer	6	6
(Slovakia) M Rybáriková	1	0
(Israel) S Pe'er	6	6
(Russia) M Kirilenko	6	6
(Estonia) K Kanepi	2	3

Quarterfinals
WC	(Japan) K Date-Krumm	2	2
3/WC	(Belgium) Y Wickmayer	6	6
(Israel) S Pe'er	6	3	6
(Russia) M Kirilenko	0	6	1

Semifinals
3/WC	(Belgium) Y Wickmayer	6	7
(Israel) S Pe'er	4	5
