= 2010 ASB Classic =

- Date: 4–9 January
- Edition: 25th
- Category: WTA International
- Draw: 32S / 16D
- Prize money: $220,000
- Surface: Hard
- Location: Auckland, New Zealand
- Venue: ASB Tennis Centre

Champions

Singles
- (Belgium) Yanina Wickmayer

Doubles
- (Zimbabwe) Cara Black / (United States) Liezel Huber
← 2009 ·	WTA Auckland Open	· 2011 →

The 2010 ASB Classic was a women's tennis tournament played on outdoor hard courts. It was the 25th edition of the ASB Classic, and was part of the WTA International tournaments of the 2010 WTA Tour. It took place at the ASB Tennis Centre in Auckland, New Zealand, from 4 January through 9 January 2010. Third-seeded Yanina Wickmayer won the singles title.

== Finals ==
=== Singles ===
(Belgium) Yanina Wickmayer defeated (Italy) Flavia Pennetta, 6–3, 6–2.

- It was Wickmayer's first title of the year and third overall.

=== Doubles ===
(Zimbabwe) Cara Black / (United States) Liezel Huber defeated (South Africa) Natalie Grandin / (United States) Laura Granville, 7–6^{(7–4)}, 6–2.

== WTA entrants ==
=== Seeds ===
Country	Player	Rank^{1}	Seed
ITA	Flavia Pennetta	12	1
CHN	Li Na	15	2
BEL	Yanina Wickmayer	16	3
ITA	Francesca Schiavone	17	4
FRA	Virginie Razzano	19	5
RUS	Elena Vesnina	23	6
FRA	Aravane Rezaï	25	7
ESP	Anabel Medina Garrigues	27	8

- Rankings as of 28 December 2009.

=== Other entrants ===
The following players received wildcards into the singles main draw:

- (Japan) Kimiko Date-Krumm
- (New Zealand) Marina Erakovic
- (Belgium) Yanina Wickmayer

The following players received entry from the qualifying draw:

- (United Kingdom) Elena Baltacha
- (France) Stéphanie Cohen-Aloro
- (Romania) Edina Gallovits
- (Romania) Monica Niculescu

== See also ==
- 2010 Heineken Open – men's tournament
