= Auckland Championships =

Tournament information
- Tour: NZLTA (1886-1912); ILTF Circuit (1913, 42, 1961-77)
- Founded: 1886; 139 years ago 1954; 71 years ago
- Abolished: 1942; 83 years ago
- Location: Auckland; New Zealand

The Auckland Championships or Auckland Tennis Championships and later known as the Auckland City Championships or Auckland Lawn Tennis Championships is a combined men's and women's open grass court tennis tournament established in 1886 and was first played on tennis courts at the Old Government House, Auckland, New Zealand. The first tournament ran until 1942 when it was discontinued. In 1954 a second event was revived that is still held today.

== History ==
In 1886 the first open tournament held in Auckland was the Auckland Association Championships but was not always staged. In the 1920s major new tennis venues were built in Auckland for the Auckland Lawn Tennis Association (now called Tennis Auckland), as well as Wellington and Christchurch comprising both grass and hard courts.

In 1920 when the Auckland LTA was looking for a permanent base, the only available site was a tip on Stanley Street. Undeterred, the local clubs raised the-then enormous sum of 1,800 pounds to prepare the site and build new courts. For the next 30 years the Tennis Centre in Stanley Street was home to local tennis matches. In 1942 the Auckland Championships were discontinued.

In 1954 a second Auckland Championships tournament was revived. In 1956 Auckland hosted its first new permanent international tournament, known as the Auckland Invitation. From 1961 to 1977 this tournament continued as a separate tournament called the Auckland City Championships. The second version of championships however have survived till today. The tournament has been known at times as the Auckland Lawn tennis Championships. Though no longer part of the international tennis circuit as it once was, it remains more of a local regional tournament today.

== See also ==
For the history of the Auckland Invitation (f.1956) see:

- ATP Auckland Open successor tournament to first Auckland Championships (1886-1942)
- WTA Auckland Open (ditto)
