= ASB Tennis Centre =

Tennis courts in Auckland, New Zealand

Coordinates: 36.853742°S 174.773507°E

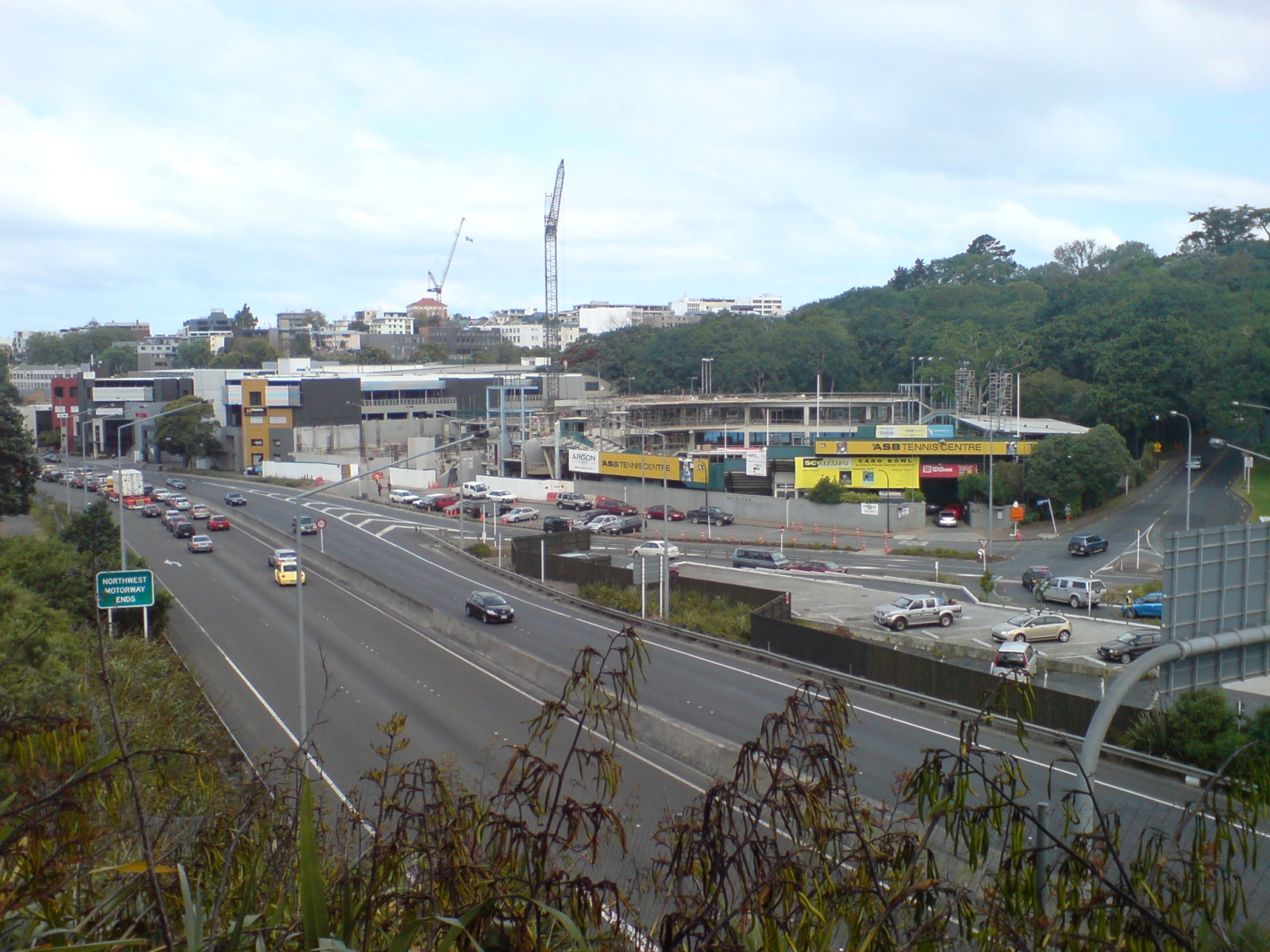
The new centre under construction in 2010.

The Manuka Doctor Arena (formerly ASB Tennis Centre) is a tennis facility located in the Parnell district of Auckland, New Zealand. The centre was opened on 18 November 1922 by the Auckland Lawn Tennis Association (now Tennis Auckland) on grounds leased from the Auckland City Council, that are a part of Pukekawa / Auckland Domain. Originally the centre had nine outdoor grass courts as well as a stand for 400 spectators. In 1977 the surface of the courts, 12 at the time, was changed to hardcourt. It currently hosts the ASB Classic for both men and women on consecutive weeks in January each year before the Australian Open. The centre is also a regular host of New Zealand Davis Cup team ties, including the 1975 and 1977 Eastern Zone finals. It is located on Stanley Street next to the Domain entrance.

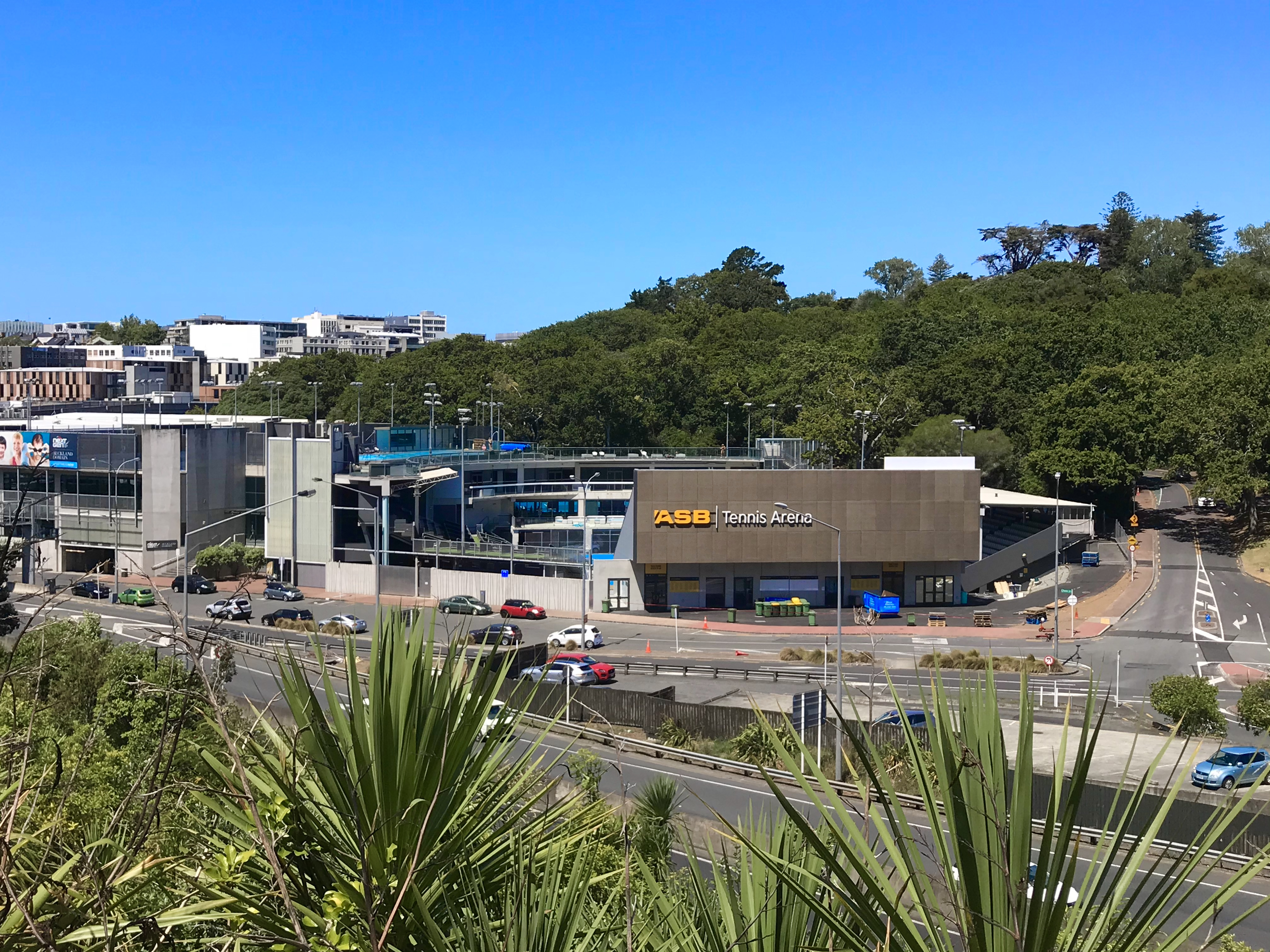
Manuka Doctor Arena. The new Yock stand is in the centre, pool and gym facilities to the left

The centre has twelve courts, all floodlit GreenSet hardcourts. Three are indoors and nine outdoors including the stadium court. As well as tennis, the centre court has hosted an International Beach Volleyball Tournament on the week after the ASB Classic.

The venue underwent redevelopment in 2010, adding advanced gym facilities, a rooftop swimming pool, a player lounge and bar, and reconfigured court layout. Plans were also made to add a retractable roof, but as of 2020 the roof project was awaiting government funding to proceed.

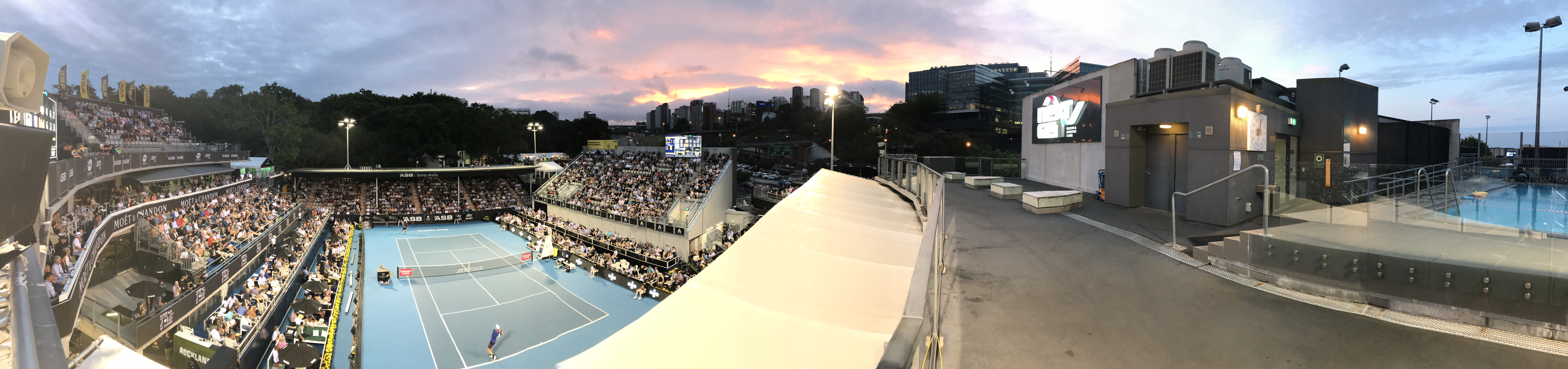
ASB Tennis Centre during ASB Classic 2020

== See also ==
- List of tennis stadiums by capacity
