= Julia Görges =

German tennis player (born 1988)

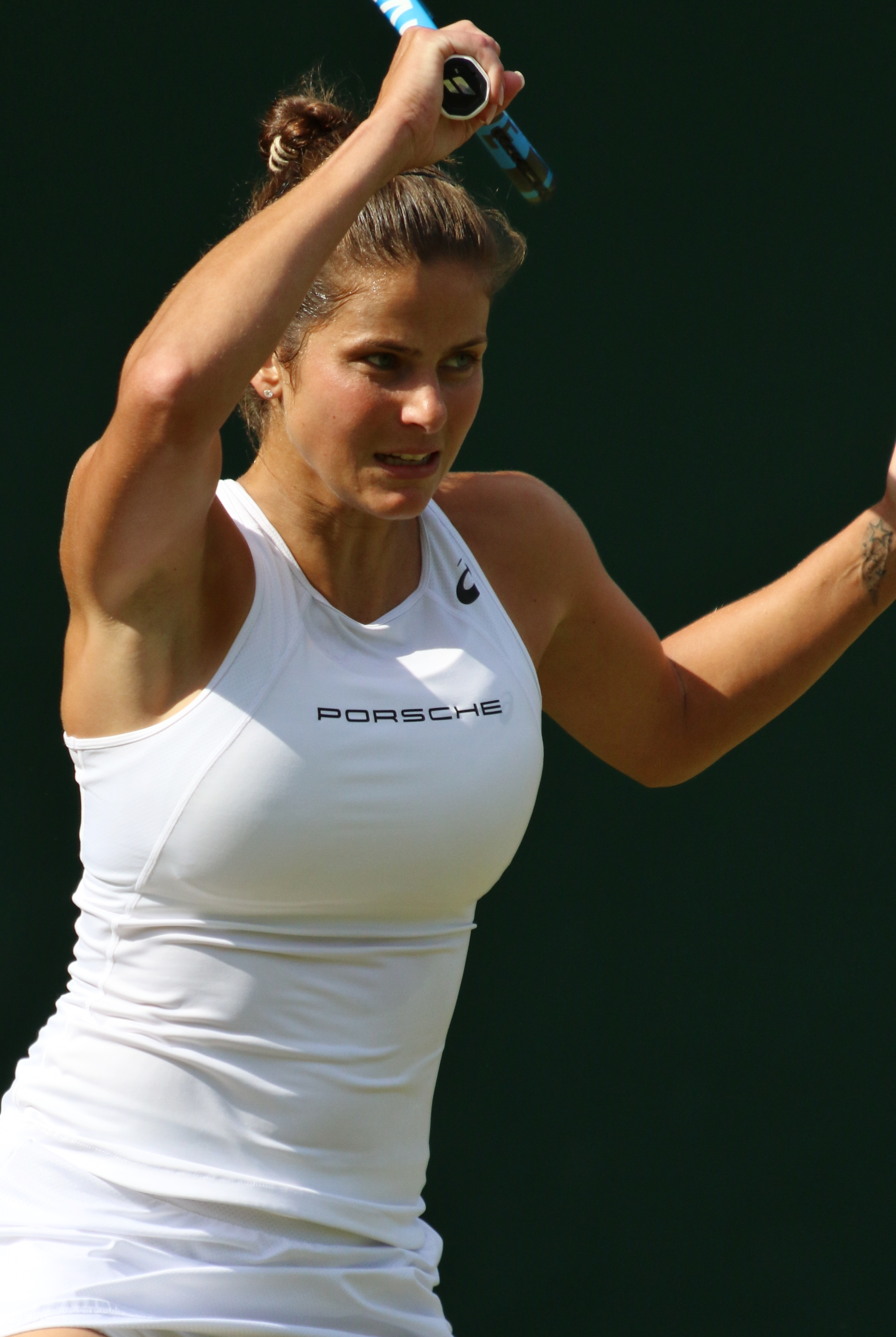
- Görges at the 2019 Wimbledon Championships
- ITF name: Julia Goerges
- Country (sports): Germany
- Residence: Bad Oldesloe, Germany; Regensburg, Germany
- Born: 2 November 1988 (age 38) Bad Oldesloe, West Germany
- Height: 1.80 m (5 ft 11 in)
- Turned pro: 2005
- Retired: 21 October 2020
- Plays: Right-handed (two-handed backhand)
- Coach: Sebastian Sachs; Michael Geserer
- Prize money: $9,913,954
- Official website: julia-goerges.com

Singles
- Career record: 479–337
- Career titles: 7
- Highest ranking: No. 9 (20 August 2018)

Grand Slam singles results
- Australian Open: 4R (2012, 2013, 2015)
- French Open: 4R (2015)
- Wimbledon: SF (2018)
- US Open: 4R (2017, 2019)

Other tournaments
- Olympic Games: 3R (2012)

Doubles
- Career record: 253–206
- Career titles: 5
- Highest ranking: No. 12 (22 August 2016)

Grand Slam doubles results
- Australian Open: SF (2015, 2016)
- French Open: 3R (2011)
- Wimbledon: SF (2016)
- US Open: QF (2012)

Other doubles tournaments
- Tour Finals: QF (2016)
- Olympic Games: 2R (2012)

Grand Slam mixed doubles results
- Australian Open: QF (2014)
- French Open: F (2014)
- Wimbledon: QF (2012)
- US Open: 2R (2015)

Team competitions
- Fed Cup: F (2014), record 13–12

Julia Görges (born 2 November 1988) is a German former professional tennis player. She was ranked as high as No. 9 in the world on 20 August 2018 and inside the top 15 in doubles, peaking at world No. 12 on 22 August 2016. She won seven singles and five doubles titles on the WTA Tour (her biggest title coming at the year-end 2017 WTA Elite Trophy), as well as six singles and six doubles titles on the ITF Circuit.

Görges turned professional in 2005, and first broke into the world's top 100 in June 2008. Prior to 2018, her best singles result in a Grand Slam tournament was reaching the fourth round five times. She broke into the top ten for the first time in February 2018, before going on to reach the semifinals at the 2018 Wimbledon Championships. She was also a two-time semifinalist in women's doubles at the Australian Open, and reached the finals in mixed doubles with Nenad Zimonjić at the 2014 French Open.

She announced her retirement from professional tennis on 21 October 2020, two weeks before her 32nd birthday.

== Personal life ==
Julia Görges was born in Bad Oldesloe to Klaus and Inge Görges, both of whom work in insurance. She has one elder maternal half-sister named Maike, who also works in insurance. She attended the Klaus-Groth-Schule and Theodor-Mommsen-Schule in Bad Oldesloe from 1995 to 2005, and completed the Mittlere Reife (middle-school diploma).

She began playing tennis around the age of five. Her tennis idol growing up was Martina Hingis, and she is also a fan of Roger Federer. She was coached by Sascha Nensel, former coach of fellow German player Nicolas Kiefer, until 2015. She preferred hard and grass courts, and her favorite tournament was the Australian Open.

Görges married former ATP Tour player Wesley Koolhof in December 2024 in Arnhem.

== Career ==
=== 2005–2008 ===
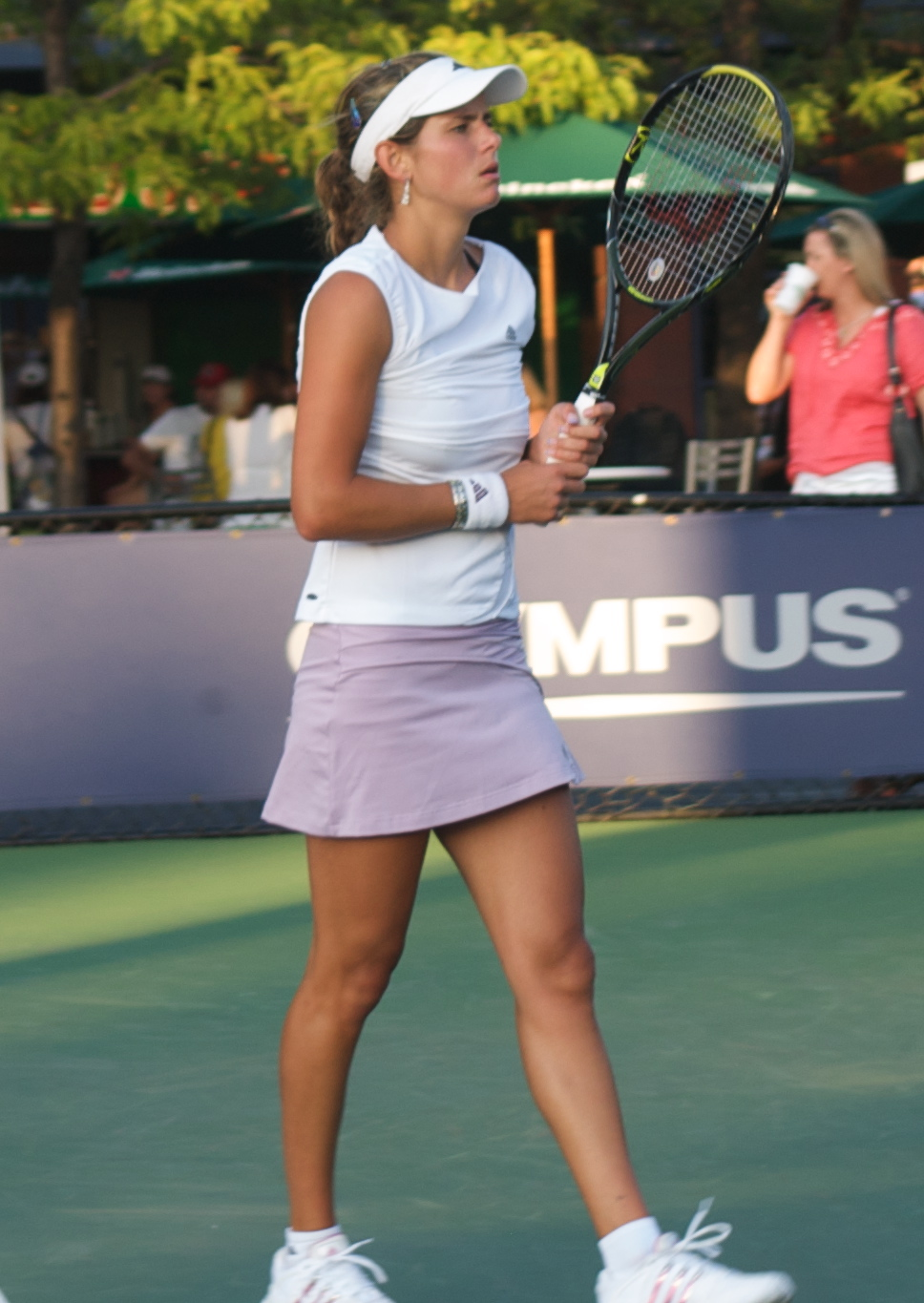
Görges at the 2008 US Open

In 2005, she began her career on the ITF Women's Circuit, playing in seven tournaments and losing in the first round in five of them. In 2006 and 2007 she continued to play mostly ITF tournaments. In 2006, she won the Wahlstedt and Bielefeld tournaments. In 2007, she won tournaments in Antalya and Bucharest and made her first WTA Tour main draw appearances, the highlight of which was a semifinal in Stockholm, where she lost to Vera Dushevina in three sets. Görges made her major main-draw debut at the US Open, losing to Justine Henin in the first round in straight sets. In 2008, Görges continued to play in a mix of ITF and WTA Tour events. Her best performances were reaching the semifinals of the Slovenia Open, where she lost to Anabel Medina Garrigues, and a quarterfinal-loss to Olga Govortsova in the Cellular South Cup.

She made her top-100 debut in the rankings after the French Open. She won her first major main-draw match at Wimbledon, where she upset the 23rd seed Katarina Srebotnik in a three-hour, 41-minute first-round match. However, she bowed out in the second round to Marina Erakovic, in straight sets.

=== 2009: Consistent top-100 ranking ===
In 2009, Görges began to play in tour events more regularly. It was the first season that she played in the main draw of all four Grand Slam tournaments. She began her season at the Brisbane International, where she lost in qualifying to Anna-Lena Grönefeld.

Görges competed at the Australian Open, the Open GdF Suez, and the Warsaw Open, losing before the third round in each. She retired in the first round of the French Open in a match against Iveta Benešová due to heat exhaustion.

Görges reached the third round of the Birmingham Classic, falling to Urszula Radwańska. She went on to play against Jelena Janković in the first round of Wimbledon, losing in straight sets. She lost prior to the third round at the Slovenia Open, the İstanbul Cup, and the US Open, where she faced Svetlana Kuznetsova.

At the Bell Challenge, she managed to reach the semifinals, before losing to Lucie Šafářová. She was defeated by Raluca Olaru in the second round of the Linz Open.

=== 2010: First WTA Tour title ===
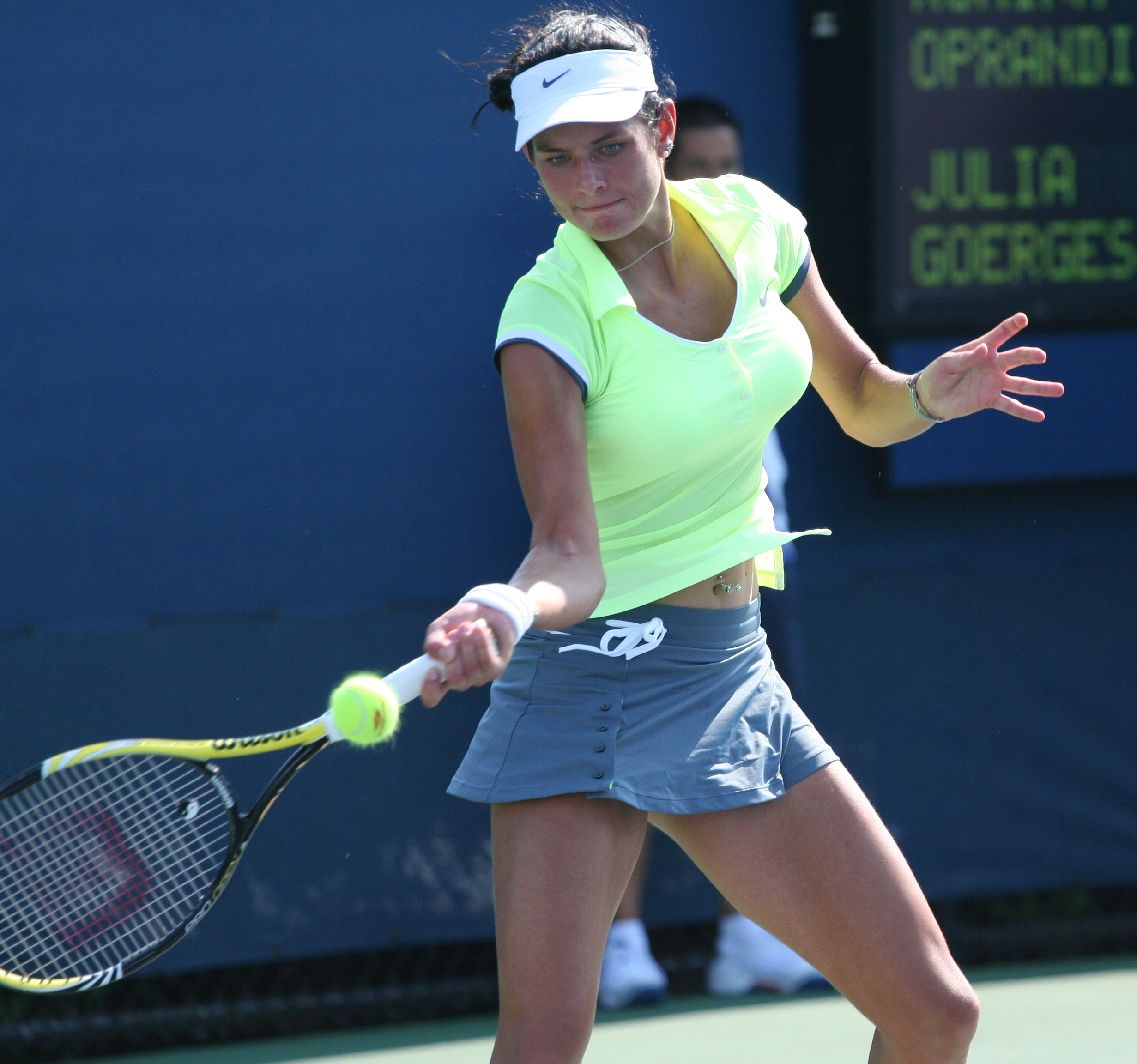
Görges at the 2010 US Open

Görges started the 2010 season at the Auckland Open, losing in the first round to Yanina Wickmayer. She went on to play at the Australian Open, where she beat Tamira Paszek, but then lost to Caroline Wozniacki in the second round.

Görges reached the quarterfinals of Strasbourg, losing to Maria Sharapova. Following a second round loss at the French Open and a first-round loss at Wimbledon, she reached the semifinals of Palermo losing to Flavia Pennetta.

At the Gastein Ladies, Görges won her first career singles title by defeating Timea Bacsinszky in the final in straight sets. She made her top-50 debut in the rankings afterward. At the Danish Open, she reached the quarterfinals, but was unable to take advantage of a 5–3 third-set lead over the top seed Wozniacki, eventually falling in a tiebreak.

Görges defeated Romina Oprandi in the first round of the US Open, before falling to the 15th seed Wickmayer in the second round. At the Japan Open, she scored her first win over a former No. 1 player by defeating Dinara Safina in the first round. In the second, she defeated the fourth seed Samantha Stosur for her first win over a current top-10 player, before losing to CoCo Vandeweghe in the quarterfinals.

At Linz, she reached the quarterfinals, but fell to the eventual champion Ana Ivanovic. In her final tournament of the season, the Luxembourg Open, she won a quarterfinal rematch with Ivanovic, defeating her in straight sets. She eventually reached her second WTA career final, losing to Roberta Vinci.

=== 2011: Second career title, breakthrough into top 25 ===
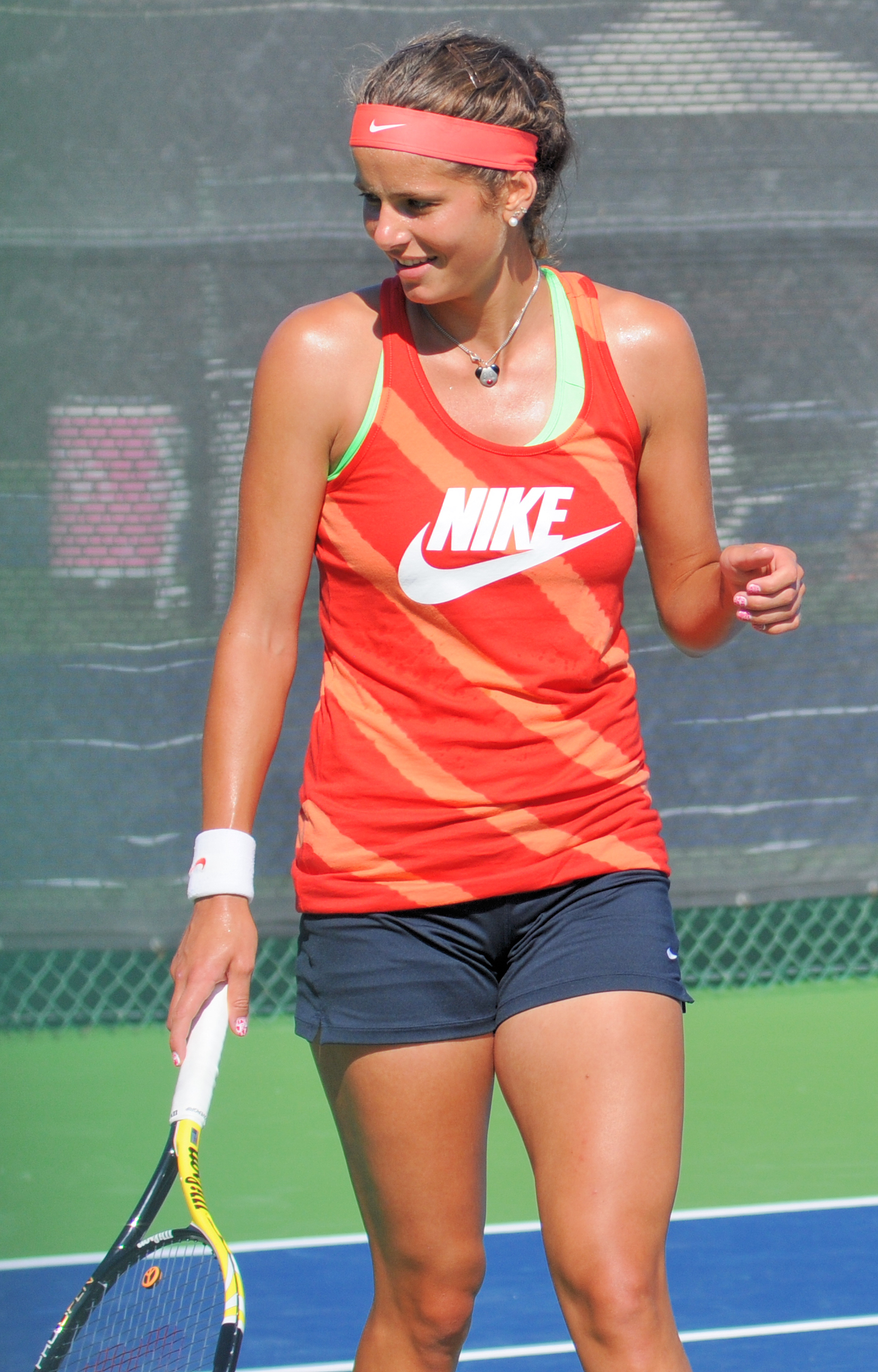
Görges practicing in San Diego in 2011

Beginning her season at the Auckland Open, Görges lost in the semifinals to the eventual champion Gréta Arn. In the second round of the Australian Open, she upset 20th seed Kaia Kanepi. Her third-round match against the 2008 champion Maria Sharapova was a three-set battle, which Görges finally lost. This marked her best performance in a Grand Slam tournament, and she was rewarded by achieving a career-high No. 34 singles ranking on 31 January 2011.

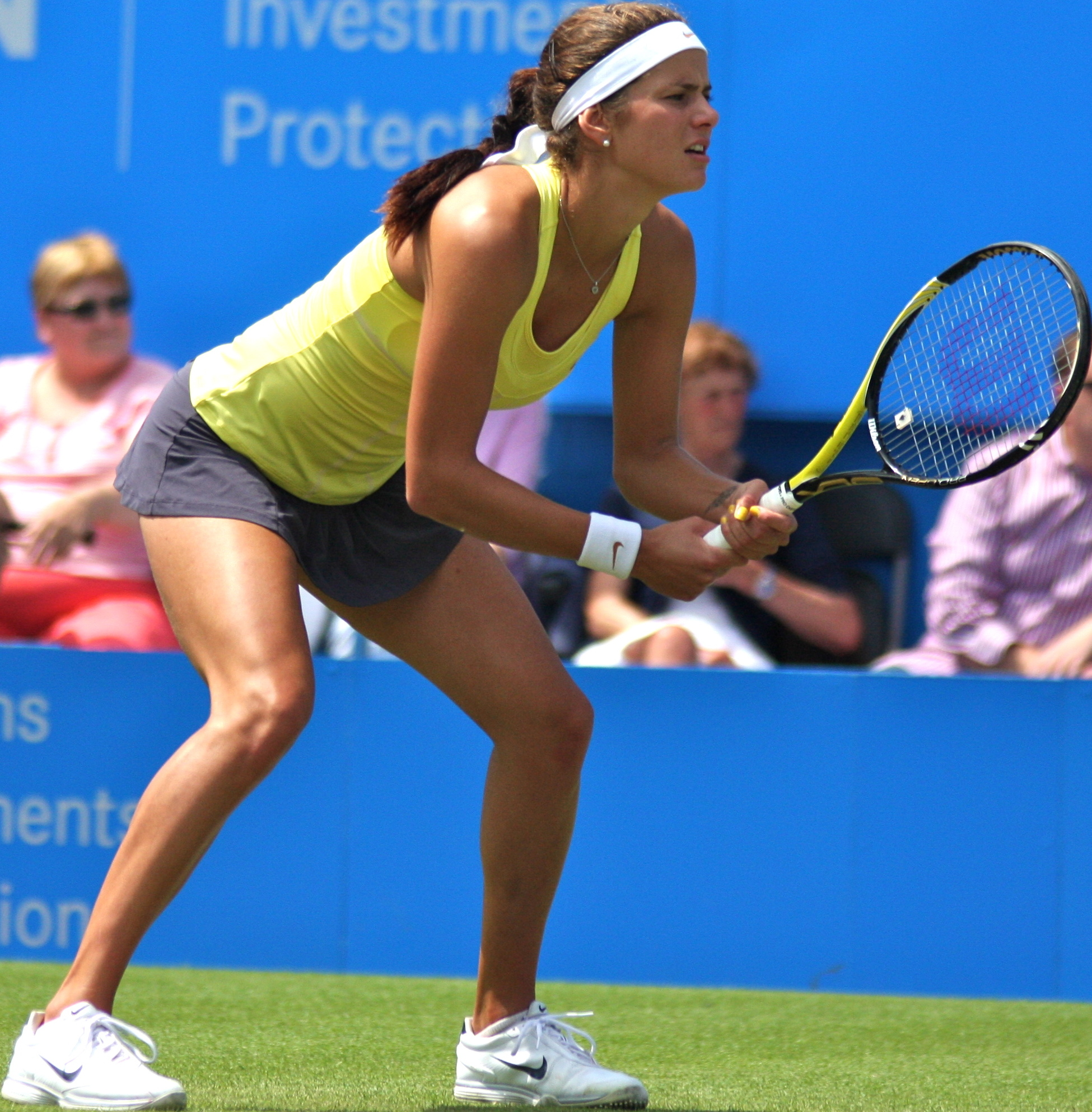
Görges at the 2011 Aegon International

In February, she helped Germany defeat Slovenia in the Fed Cup competition by clinching the tie with a straight-sets win over Maša Zec Peškirič, her first win in the Fed Cup. Switching to the hardcourt, she lost in the first round of Monterrey to Ksenia Pervak, and then continued to struggle at Indian Wells and Miami, losing in the second and first rounds, respectively. At the Family Circle Cup in Charleston, however, she made a quarterfinal appearance on the green clay, losing to Elena Vesnina in three sets.

In the Fed Cup in Stuttgart, Görges won a rubber for Germany against Melanie Oudin, who had defeated her in Miami. Staying there for the Stuttgart Grand Prix, she won her first Premier-level tournament and second WTA tournament, upsetting Samantha Stosur and benefitting from a retirement by Victoria Azarenka. In the final, Görges scored the biggest win of her career by defeating world No. 1, Caroline Wozniacki, in two sets, to become the first German to win the Porsche Tennis Grand Prix since Anke Huber in 1994.

Less than two weeks after winning in Stuttgart, Görges defeated Wozniacki once again at Madrid. She reached the semifinals, where she lost to Azarenka.

Görges was the 17th seed at the French Open, but fell to the 11th seed Marion Bartoli in three sets in the third round.

After a first round exit to Ana Ivanovic at the Eastbourne International, she reached the third round of Wimbledon where she fell to the 24th seed Dominika Cibulková in three sets.

Görges failed to advance past the second round at Bad Gastein, Stanford, Carlsbad, Toronto, Cincinnati or Dallas. As the 24th seed at the US Open, she fell to the 13th seed Peng Shuai in two close sets in the third round.

Taking part in the Asian part of the WTA Tour, she fell in the quarterfinals of the Korea Open, the third round of the Pan Pacific Open, and the first round of the China Open. She finished her 2011 season with a semifinal loss to Azarenka at the Luxembourg Open. She finished the year ranked 21st, accumulating a 38–25 singles record and a 22–18 doubles record.

=== 2012: Top-20 ranking, consistent form ===
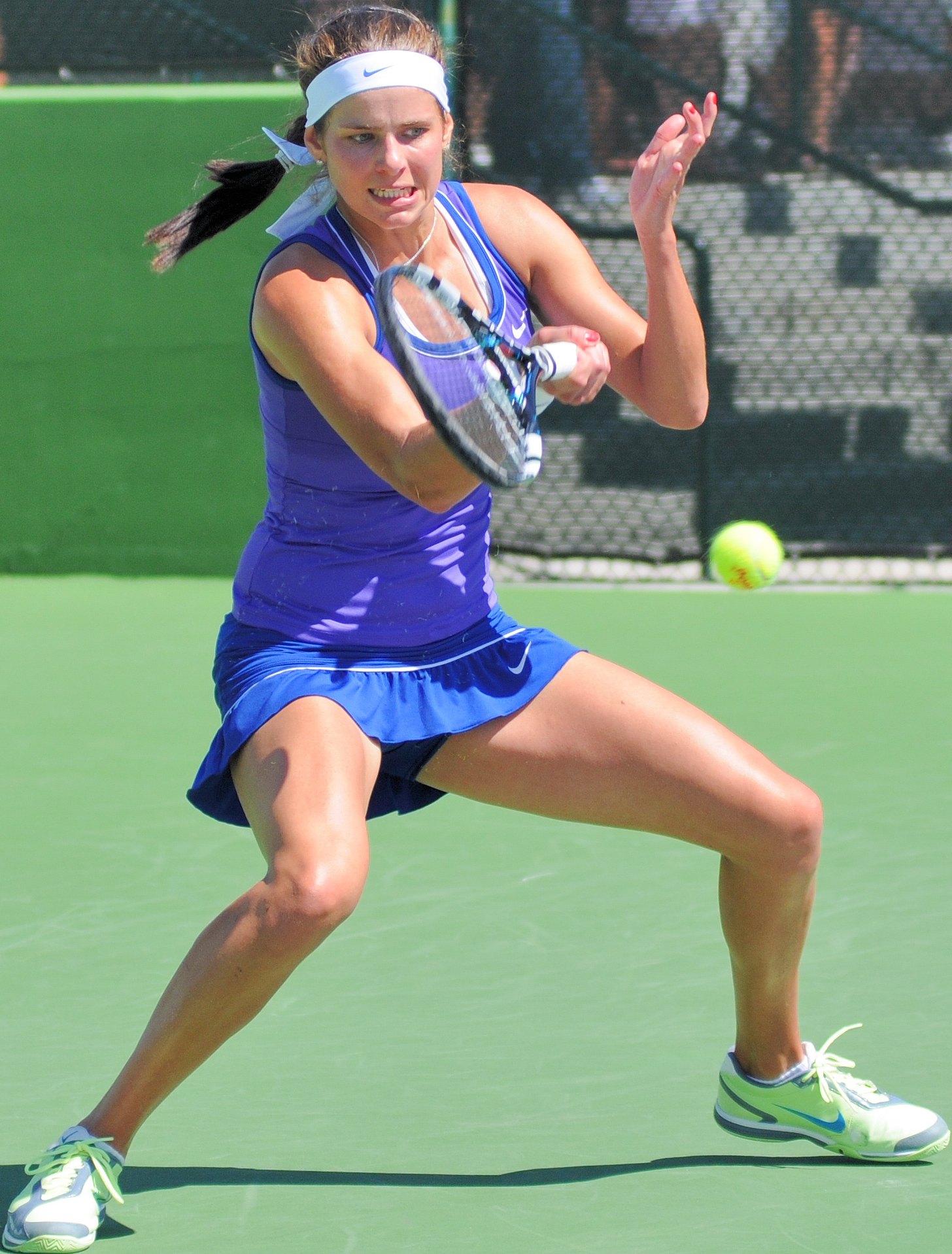
Görges at the 2012 Indian Wells

Seeded fifth at the Auckland Open, she defeated defending champion Gréta Arn, before falling to compatriot Angelique Kerber, in straight sets. Görges had more success in doubles reaching the final with Flavia Pennetta, before falling to the Czech duo of Andrea Hlaváčková and Lucie Hradecká in a third-set super tiebreak. After retiring in the first round of the Sydney International against Jelena Janković, she achieved her best Australian Open performance to date by reaching the fourth round. Görges defeated Polona Hercog, Eleni Daniilidou, and Romina Oprandi, before being dominated by the eighth seed, Agnieszka Radwańska. Playing in Fed Cup, she lost to Petra Kvitová in an extremely tight three-setter. Partnering Anna-Lena Grönefeld, she lost to Iveta Benešová and Barbora Záhlavová-Strýcová as the Czech Republic won the tie 4–1.

Ranked 21st and seeded sixth, she reached the quarterfinals of the Open GdF Suez, falling to Klára Zakopalová in three sets. Görges then lost in the second round in Qatar to Varvara Lepchenko, before reaching the final in Dubai. She defeated Svetlana Kuznetsova, Casey Dellacqua and Daniela Hantuchová, scored a two-set win over third seed Wozniacki, but then fell to Agnieszka Radwańska again. Her good result at Dubai helped her to achieve a career-high ranking of 15.

Seeded 14th at the Indian Wells Open, she advanced to the fourth round in straight sets, before becoming another victim of Azarenka. After receiving another bye into the second round in Miami, Görges was defeated by the four-time Grand Slam champion Kim Clijsters.

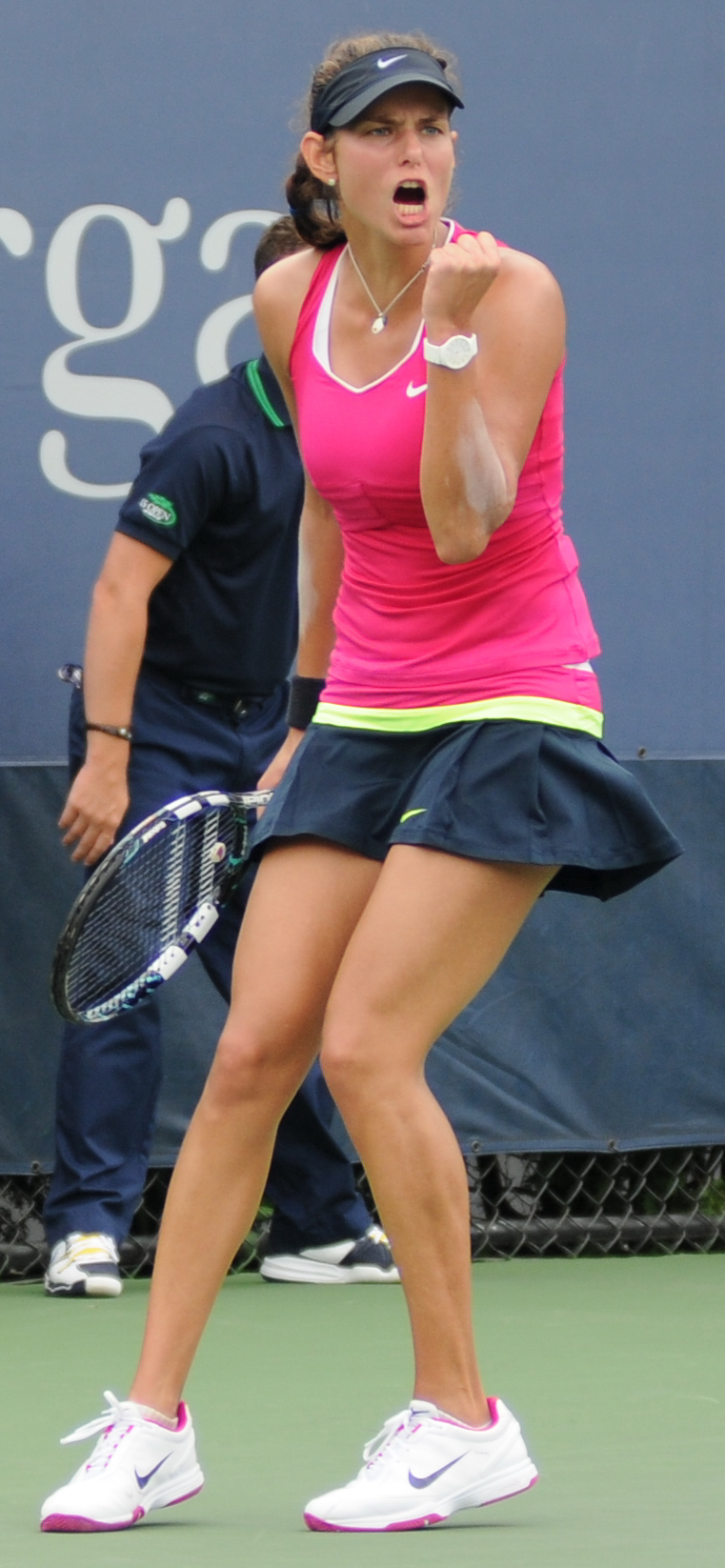
Görges at the 2012 US Open

At Roland Garros, Görges was seeded 25th. She reached the third round, beating Lucie Hradecká and Heather Watson along the way. She lost in the third round to Arantxa Rus, ending the match with two double faults. At the end of the third set Görges complained about the light, which was dismissed by the head supervisor. After this she asked for a medical time-out and asked again to suspend the match, which again was denied by the umpire. In the women's doubles, she lost in the first round with her partner Samantha Stosur.

She was the top seed in Bad Gastein but lost in three sets to the Dutch qualifier Richèl Hogenkamp, ranked 211, who won her first match on tour. At the same tournament, she won the doubles competition, partnering Jill Craybas. In the final they defeated Grönefeld and Petra Martić.

At Wimbledon, she lost in the third round to Ana Ivanovic, after defeating Shahar Pe'er and Anastasiya Yakimova in the first two rounds. In Palermo, Görges was defeated in the quarterfinals by Záhlavová-Strýcová. In the second round of the Swedish Open, she lost to the eventual champion Hercog in straight sets.

At the London Olympics, Görges surprisingly defeated second seed Agnieszka Radwańska in the first round. She also beat Lepchenko in round two, but in then lost to Maria Kirilenko in straight sets. In the doubles, she teamed with Grönefeld, and reached the second round.

In August, she lost in the first round at Montreal and reached the second round in Cincinnati. At the US Open she lost in the first round to Kristýna Plíšková. In September, she lost in the first round in Seoul. In Tokyo, she defeated Monica Niculescu but lost to Marion Bartoli in the second round.

At the China Open in Beijing, she defeated Vania King and eighth seed Stosur. In the third round, she again lost to the ninth seed Bartoli. She then played a fairly successful tournament in Linz, reaching the finals of both singles and doubles. In the singles final she lost to world No. 1 Azarenka. In doubles, she played alongside Záhlavová-Strýcová, and they were defeated by another German-Czech pair, Grönefeld and Květa Peschke. In Luxembourg, Görges reached the second round and lost to Niculescu, who went on to be defeated in the final by Venus Williams. She ended 2012 ranked as the world No. 18.

=== 2013: Loss of form ===
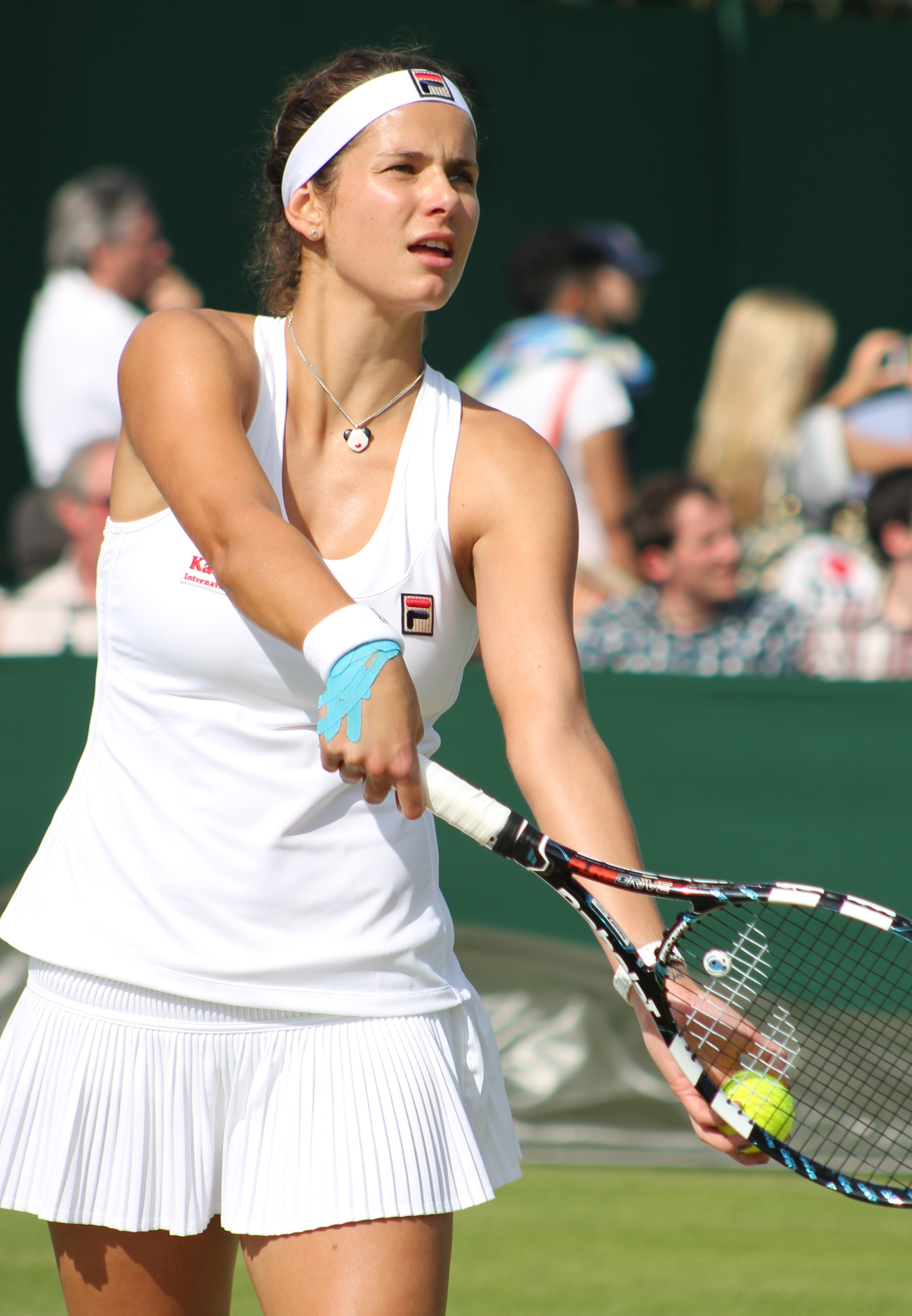
Görges at the 2013 Wimbledon Championships

Görges began her season at the Auckland Open. Seeded second, she lost in the second round to Johanna Larsson. In doubles, she and her partner, Yaroslava Shvedova, reached the final where they lost to Cara Black/Anastasia Rodionova. At the Sydney International, Görges was defeated in the first round by qualifier Svetlana Kuznetsova. Seeded 18th at the Australian Open, Görges advanced to the fourth round after wins over Vera Dushevina, Romina Oprandi, and Zheng Jie. She lost in her fourth-round match to sixth seed and eventual finalist, Li Na.

Seeded seventh at the Open GdF Suez, Görges was stunned in the first round by French wildcard Kristina Mladenovic. During the Fed Cup tie against France, Görges won both her matches defeating Kristina Mladenovic and Pauline Parmentier. Germany won 3–1 over France. At the Dubai Championships, Görges lost in the first round to fifth seed and eventual finalist Sara Errani. In March, Görges played at Indian Wells. As the 21st seed, she received a first-round bye, and defeated Sofia Arvidsson before she lost her third-round match to tenth seed Nadia Petrova. At the Miami Open, Görges was the 24th seed, and she received a first-round bye. She was defeated in the second round by Ajla Tomljanović.

Görges began her clay-court season at the Family Circle Cup. Seeded tenth, she reached the third round after wins over Yulia Putintseva and Olga Govortsova. She lost her third-round match to Stefanie Vögele. Seeded fourth at the first edition of the Katowice Open, Görges retired during her first-round match against qualifier Jill Craybas due to dizziness. At the Porsche Tennis Grand Prix, Görges was defeated in the second round by fifth seed Petra Kvitová. Seeded eighth at the Portugal Open, Görges suffered a first-round loss at the hands of Monica Puig.

In the Madrid Open, Görges defeated Bojana Jovanovski but withdrew from her second-round match against Varvara Lepchenko because of an infection. In Rome, Görges won her first-round match against Hlaváčková, before losing to the third seed Azarenka. In Brussels she reached the second round, after defeating CoCo Vandeweghe, but retired in the match against Romina Oprandi due to a right wrist injury.

At Roland Garros, she lost in the first round to Zuzana Kučová. She reached the second round in Nuremberg, losing to Andrea Petkovic. This result was followed by a series of first-round losses: against Mariana Duque at Wimbledon, against Olga Govortsova in Stanford, against Sesil Karatantcheva in Carlsbad, against Roberta Vinci in Toronto and Magdaléna Rybáriková in Cincinnati.

She was more successful in doubles during this part of season. Alongside Darija Jurak, she reached the final in Stanford, where they lost to the American pair Raquel Kops-Jones and Abigail Spears. In Cincinnati she paired with Barbora Záhlavová-Strýcová and they lost in the semifinals to the other Czech-German pairing of Grönefeld and Peschke. In New Haven, Görges won her first-round match against Bojana Jovanovski, but lost in the second round to the sixth seed Sloane Stephens. At the US Open she lost to the 21-year-old American Christina McHale in the first round.

Görges then participated in Seoul where she was the sixth seed. She defeated Misaki Doi before losing to Irina-Camelia Begu in the second round. She lost her openers in her final three tournaments of 2013; against Sorana Cîrstea in Tokyo, against Kaia Kanepi in Beijing and against the qualifier Camila Giorgi in Linz. She ended the year at No. 73.

=== 2014: Out of top 100, downfall ===
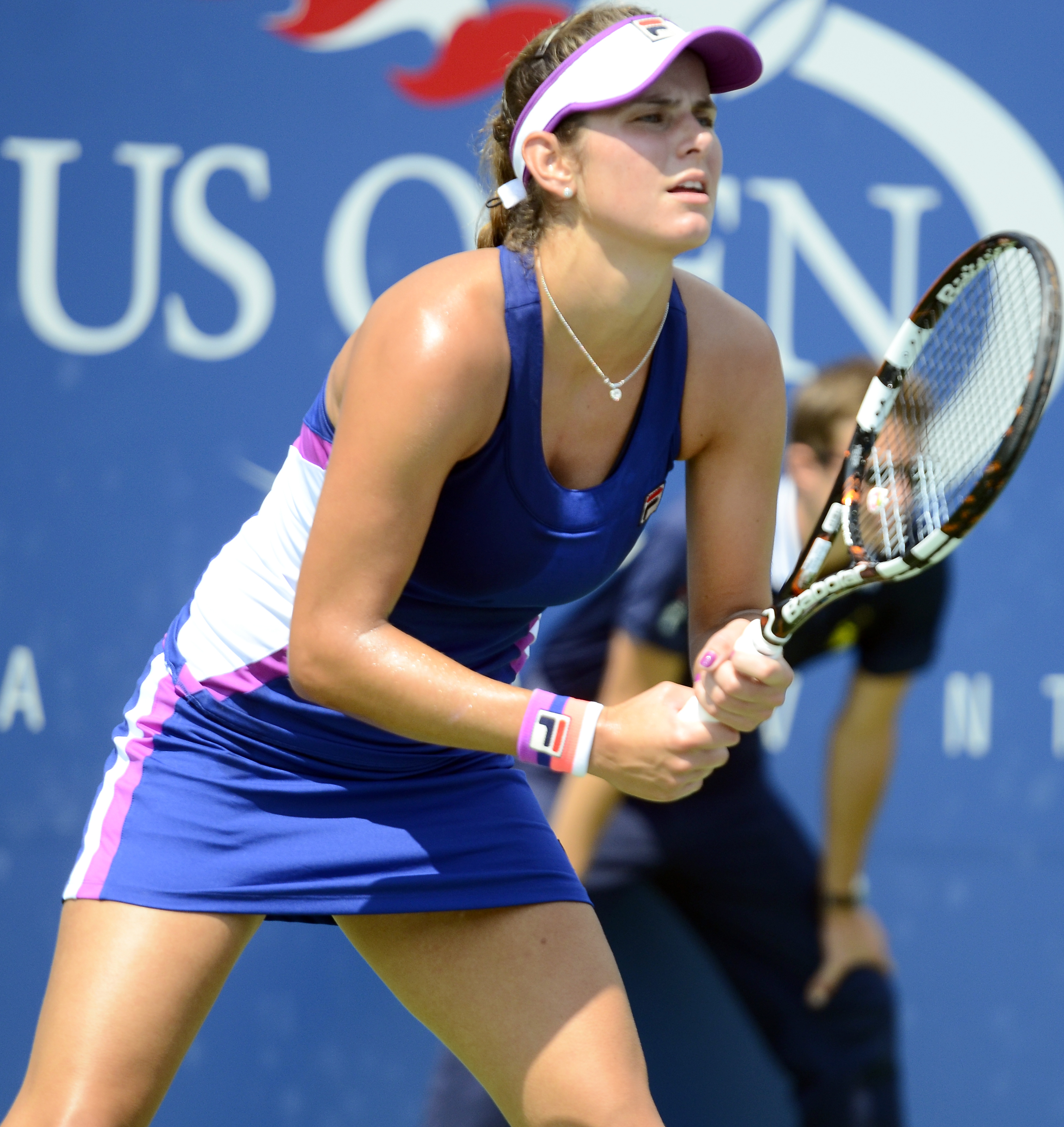
Görges at the 2014 US Open

To start the year, Görges played the Auckland Open making it to the second round, before losing to Sachie Ishizu in three sets. In Sydney, Görges retired in the final round of qualifying but was awarded a lucky loser spot in the main draw, where she lost to Wozniacki. At the Australian Open, Görges upset seventh seed Sara Errani in the first round, but lost to Lauren Davis in round two. In Pattaya, Görges reached the semifinals, losing to Karolína Plíšková. Having fallen out of the top 100 for one week, her success in Pattaya moved her back to world No. 88.

The following week, Görges competed in Acapulco where she defeated the Mexican wildcard Marcela Zacarías in the first round, before losing to Kaia Kanepi in three sets. She reached the second round at Indian Wells, where she lost to Maria Sharapova. She did not qualify for the Miami Open and lost to Virginie Razzano in the first round at the Family Circle Cup. In Stuttgart, she defeated Sorana Cîrstea before falling to Ana Ivanovic in three sets. Then she qualified for the Madrid Open, but lost her opener to fourth seed Simona Halep. She did not qualify for Rome but managed to reach the quarterfinals at Strasbourg the week before the French Open. She defeated the top seed Sloane Stephens and Lauren Davis, but lost to Madison Keys.

At the French Open, Görges lost in the second round to Eugenie Bouchard, in three sets. Partnering Anna-Lena Grönefeld in the doubles, she lost in the first round to the unseeded pair Dominika Cibulková and Kirsten Flipkens. However, in the mixed doubles partnering Nenad Zimonjić, Görges had a more successful run, reaching her first major final. The German-Serbian pair lost to the unseeded Grönefeld and Jean-Julien Rojer in three sets.

At Wimbledon, Görges lost in the first round to the eventual semifinalist Lucie Šafářová in two tie-breaks. In the doubles event, she partnered her fellow German, Grönefeld. The pair fell in the quarterfinals to Petkovic and Rybáriková. The following week, she competed at the Gastein Ladies where she lost to Stefanie Vögele in the first round. At the Swedish Open, Görges defeated the seventh seed María Teresa Torró Flor in the first round to book a second round clash with another Spaniard, Sílvia Soler Espinosa, losing in three sets. In doubles, Görges was the top seed alongside Katarzyna Piter, but they could only make the quarterfinals, losing to the British pairing of Jocelyn Rae and Anna Smith.

At the US Open in New York, Görges fought a spirited first-round match against the 11th-seeded Flavia Pennetta, losing in a three-setter. She then competed at the Coupe Banque Nationale in Québec where she was seeded fifth. She reached the quarterfinals, after defeating Stéphanie Dubois and Melanie Oudin. She then defeated Andrea Hlaváčková to face Mirjana Lučić-Baroni in the last four, but lost to the eventual tournament champion. Partnering Hlaváčková in the doubles, she made it to the final, but lost in straight sets to Lucie Hradecká and Lučić-Baroni.

=== 2015: Australian Open doubles semifinal ===
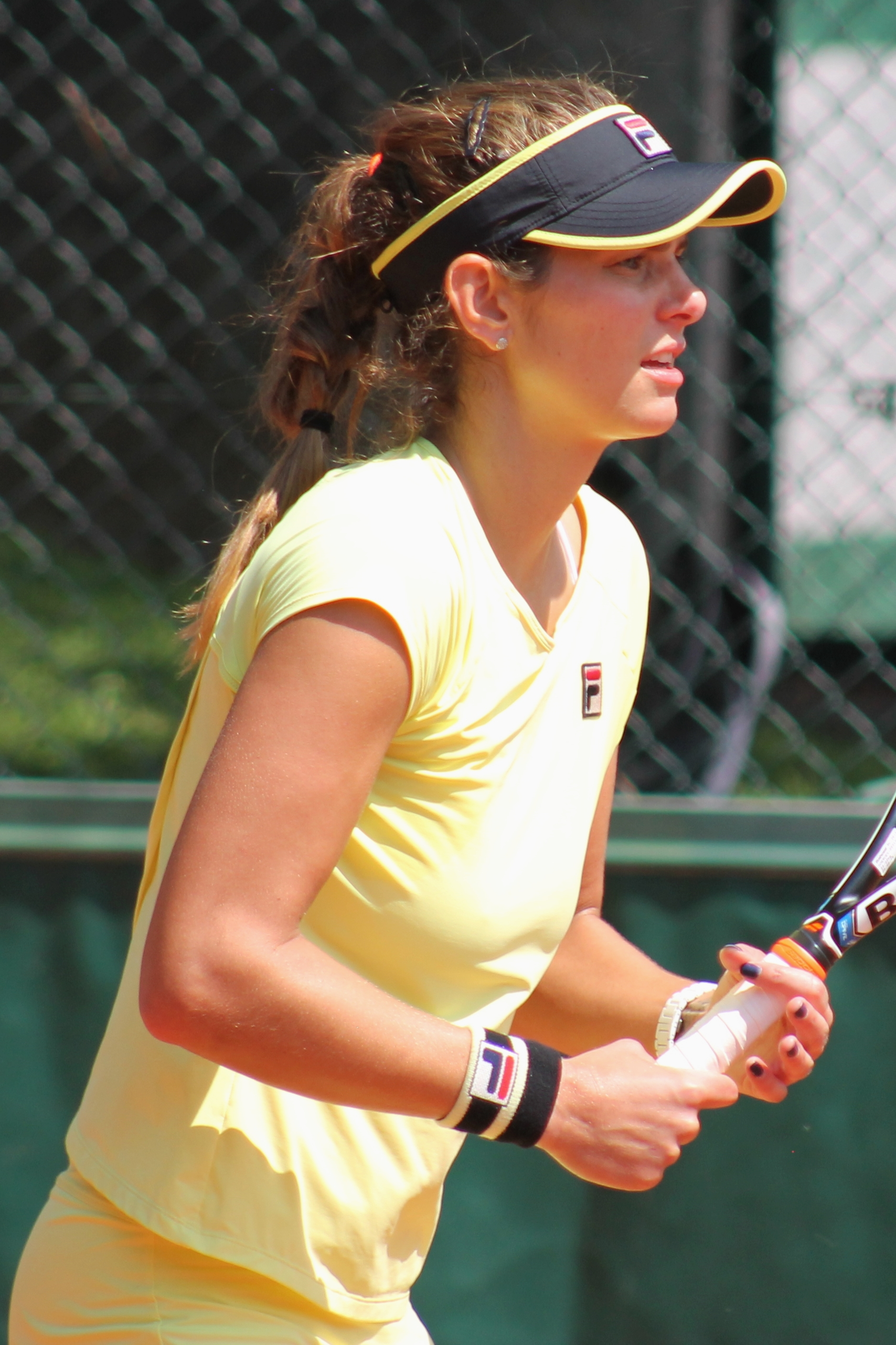
Görges at 2015 French Open

Görges reached the quarterfinals in Auckland, where she lost to the top seed Caroline Wozniacki. At the Australian Open she defeated Bencic, Koukalová and Hradecká, before losing in the fourth round to Ekaterina Makarova. She was also successful in the doubles, where together with Anna-Lena Grönefeld, she reached the semifinals.

Görges won a dead rubber playing in the doubles alongside Sabine Lisicki in the Fed Cup match against Australia. In March, she reached the quarterfinals in Kuala Lumpur where she lost to Alexandra Dulgheru in straight sets. In April, Görges played for Germany in the Fed Cup semifinals. She lost her singles match against Svetlana Kuznetsova and Germany lost to Russia 3–2.

At the French Open, Görges battled past CoCo Vandeweghe in three sets in the first round, before scoring an upset against the fifth seed Wozniacki in the second round in straight sets. She defeated Irina Falconi before losing to Sara Errani in round four. In the doubles she played alongside Barbora Krejčíková. They lost in the first round to Martina Hingis and Sania Mirza.

=== 2016: Two major semifinals in doubles ===
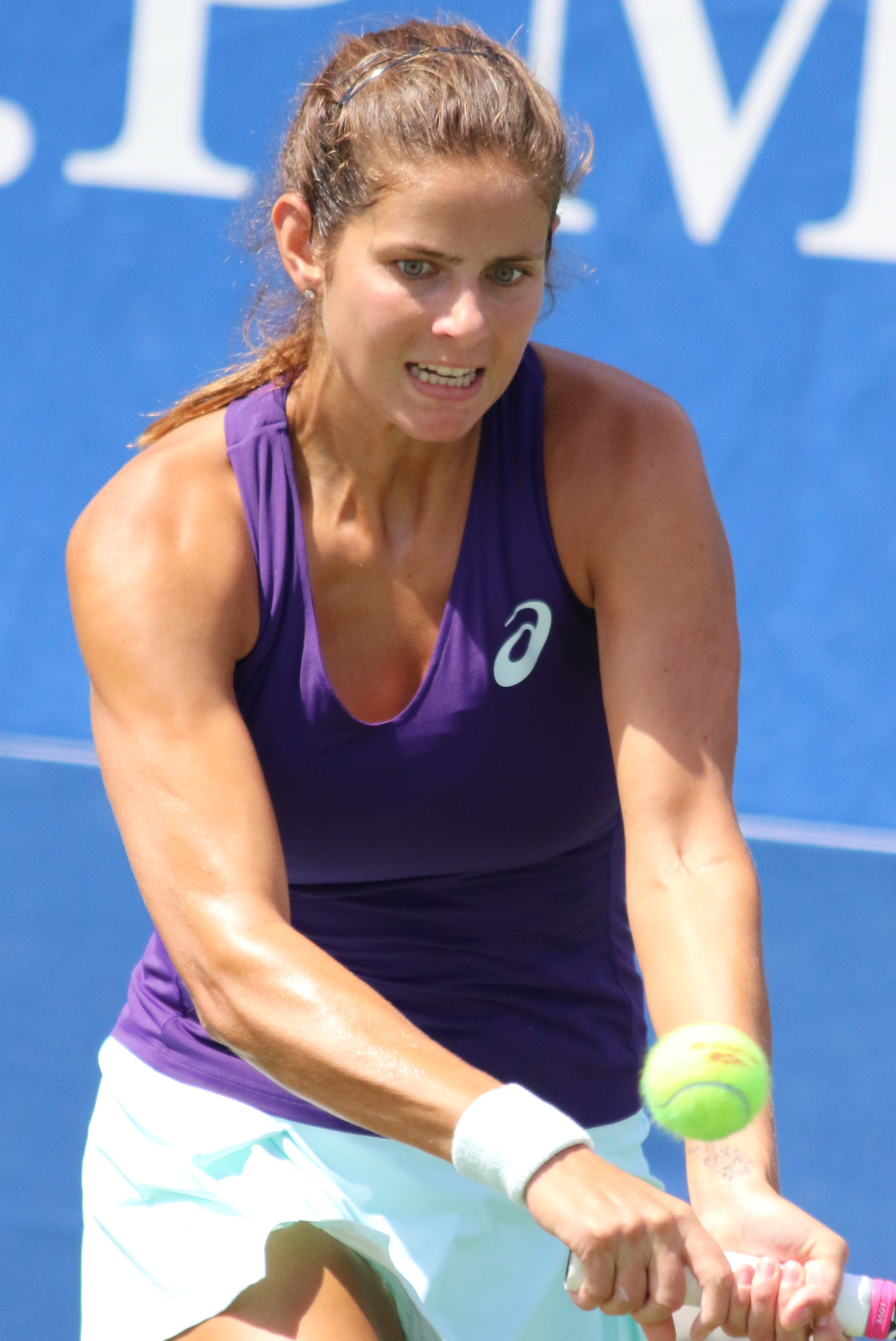
Görges at the 2016 US Open

Görges started the new season by reaching the final in Auckland, that she lost to Sloane Stephens. At the Australian Open, she defeated Andreea Mitu, before losing in straight sets to her doubles partner, the ninth seed Karolína Plíšková. In the doubles, Görges and Karolína Plíšková reached the semifinals, where they lost to the top seeds and eventual winners, Hingis and Mirza.

Görges received a wildcard in Dubai, where she defeated Svetlana Kuznetsova, losing only a single game. In the second round she lost to Barbora Strýcová. In doubles she partnered Tímea Babos. They lost to the French pair, Caroline Garcia and Kristina Mladenovic, in the semifinals. In Doha Görges faced again Kuznetsova in the first round, and this time she lost. Together with Babos she reached quarterfinals in the doubles, where they lost to the eventual winners, Chan Hao-ching and Chan Yung-jan.

In Indian Wells, Görges lost in the first round to Camila Giorgi. In the doubles she played alongside Karolína Plíšková. They lost in the final to Mattek-Sands and CoCo Vandeweghe. In Miami, Görges defeated Nao Hibino and Sam Stosur before losing to Simona Halep in third round.

Görges reached the semifinals in Nürnberg but lost to the eventual champion, Kiki Bertens.

At the French Open, Görges defeated Johanna Konta in the first round, before losing to Monica Puig in the second. In the doubles, she again played alongside Karolína Plíšková, and they lost in the third round to the eventual runners-up, Ekaterina Makarova and Elena Vesnina. At Wimbledon, Görges lost in the first round to Yaroslava Shvedova. In the doubles, Görges and Plíšková reached the semifinals, which they lost to the Williams sisters.

Görges reached the semifinals in Båstad, losing to the eventual winner Laura Siegemund. At the US Open, Görges defeated Yanina Wickmayer before losing to Venus Williams in the second round. Görges reached the semifinals of the Kremlin Cup, where she lost Daria Gavrilova. She played in the doubles draw at the 2016 WTA Finals, partnering Karolína Plíšková, but they lost in the first match against Garcia/Mladenovic.

=== 2017: Late career rapid rise ===
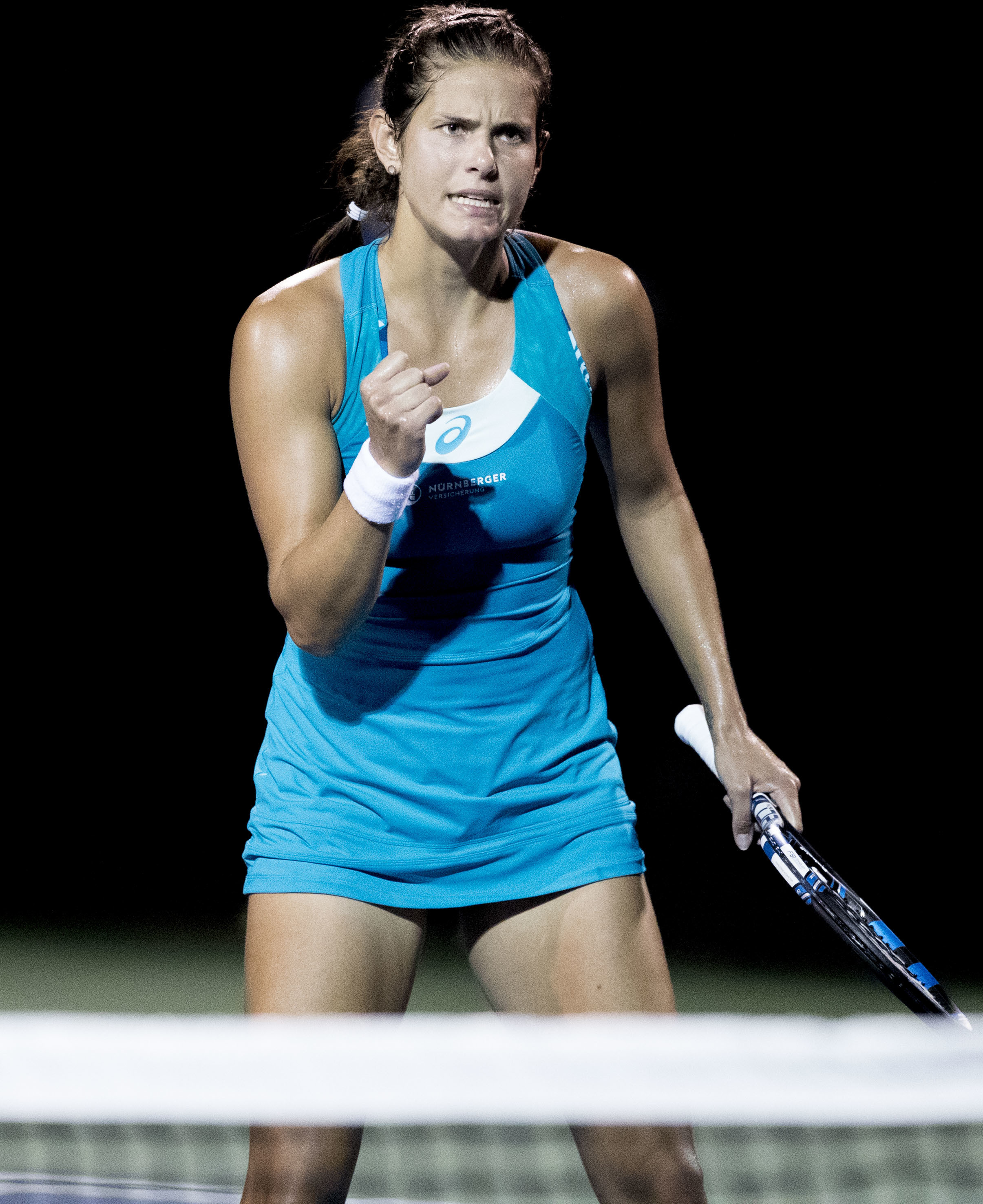
Julia Görges at the 2017 Washington Open

Görges started the 2017 season in Auckland, defeating the third seed and former world No. 1, Caroline Wozniacki before losing in the semifinals to Ana Konjuh.

At the Australian Open she won her opening match against Kateřina Siniaková but then lost to Jelena Janković. At the French Open, Görges lost her opening match in a very tight third set to the American Madison Brengle. Preparing for Wimbledon, Görges reached her first final on grass at the Mallorca Open. She lost to the second seed Anastasija Sevastova. At Wimbledon, she lost in three sets to Lesia Tsurenko. She reached her second final of the year on clay, where she lost to the home favourite Irina-Camelia Begu at the Bucharest Open.

In August, Görges reached her third final of the year at the Washington Open, where she lost to Makarova. A week later, at Cincinnati, she knocked out world No. 10, Agnieszka Radwanska, in the first round and world No. 5, Elina Svitolina, in the third round, but lost to Sloane Stephens in two sets.

Görges was seeded 30th at the US Open. She defeated compatriot Annika Beck in the first round, Zheng Saisai in the second and Aleksandra Krunić in the third to reach the fourth round for the first time. Görges could not avenge her loss against Stephens, and lost in three sets.

In October, Görges won the Kremlin Cup by defeating Daria Kasatkina in the final. It was her first singles title since 2011.

The win in Moscow propelled her back into the top 20, and as a result guaranteed her qualification for the WTA Elite Trophy in Zhuhai. Görges was drawn into the Azalea Group, alongside the top-seeded Kristina Mladenovic and the Wimbledon semifinalist Magdaléna Rybáriková. She defeated them both in straight sets to advance to the semifinal stage, where she faced Anastasija Sevastova, whom she defeated in straight sets as well. She then defeated CoCo Vandeweghe to win the biggest title of her career. She finished the year with a nine-match winning streak and a career-high ranking of 14.

=== 2018: Top 10 debut, Wimbledon semifinal, two more career titles ===
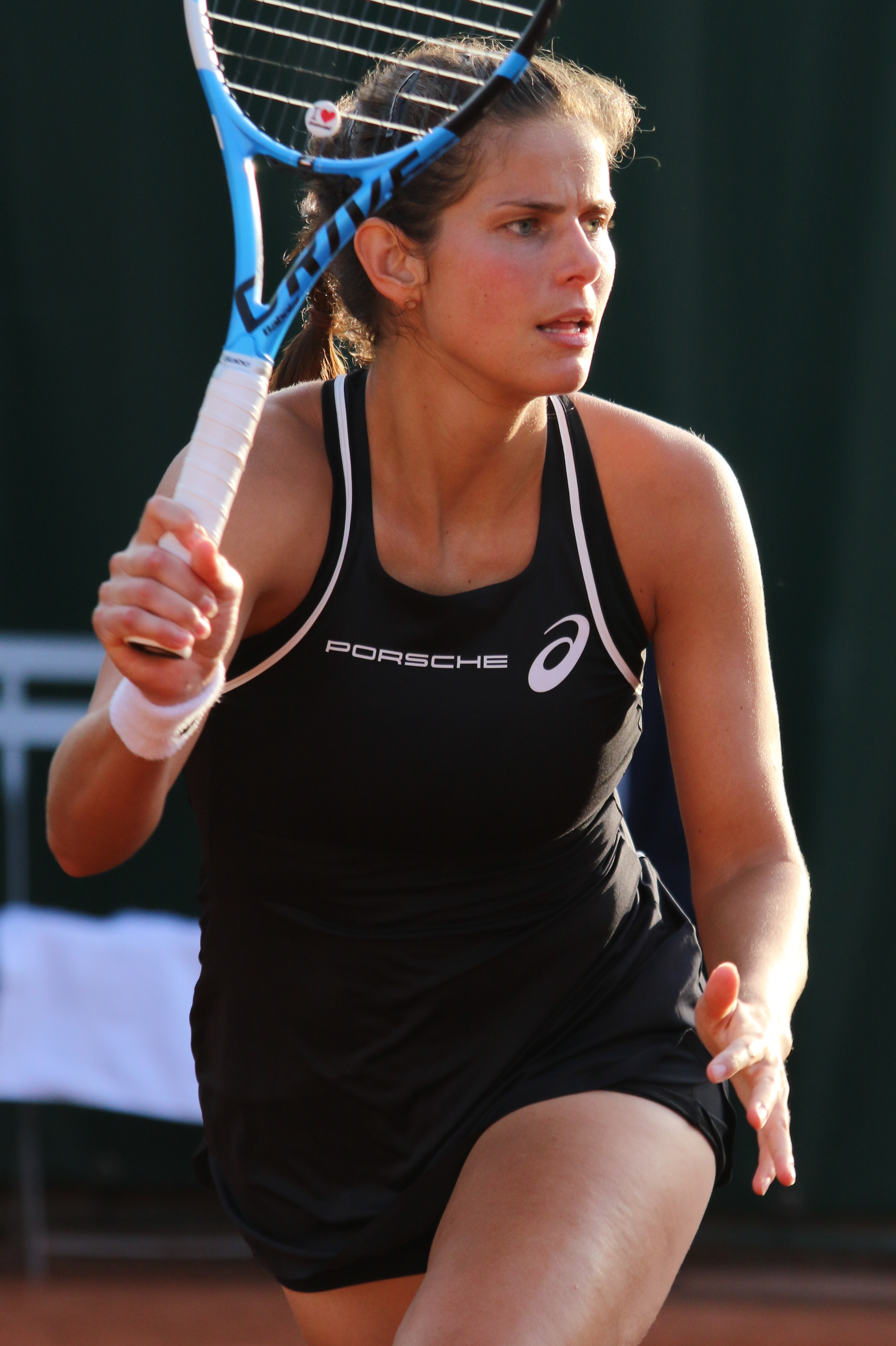
Görges at the 2018 French Open

Entering 2018 with the confidence and form of the last year, Görges won the Auckland Open. This gave her back to back titles after a previous drought of six years, and extended her winning run to 14 matches, only two of which went to the third set.

At the Australian Open, she lost in the second round to Alizé Cornet. Görges then played in St. Petersburg, where she lost in the semifinals to Petra Kvitová. Despite the loss, Görges made her top 10 debut following the tournament, as Kristina Mladenovic failed to defend the title.

In Doha, she reached the quarterfinals but retired in the match against Kvitová during the second set because of a hip injury. In April, she reached final of Premier tournament in Charleston, defeating Naomi Osaka, Daria Kasatkina and Anastasija Sevastova. In the final, she lost to Kiki Bertens.

Görges played for Germany in Fed Cup semifinals against Czech Republic. She lost her first rubber against Petra Kvitová. Görges then defeated Karolína Plíšková, but this was the only point won by German team and Czech Republic advanced to the final.

At the French Open, she played as the 11th seed. She defeated Dominika Cibulková and Alison Van Uytvanck, before losing to Serena Williams in the third round.

She started the grass-court season in Birmingham, where she lost in the quarterfinals to defending champion Kvitová. In Eastbourne, Görges received bye in the first round and in the second round she lost to Aryna Sabalenka. At Wimbledon, Görges reached her first major semifinal, defeating Monica Puig, Vera Lapko, Barbora Strýcová, Donna Vekić and Kiki Bertens en route. She lost her semifinal match to Serena Williams.

In New Haven, she reached the semifinals. In October, she won her sixth career singles title at the Luxembourg Open, defeating Belinda Bencic in the final.

=== 2019: Defending Auckland Open title ===
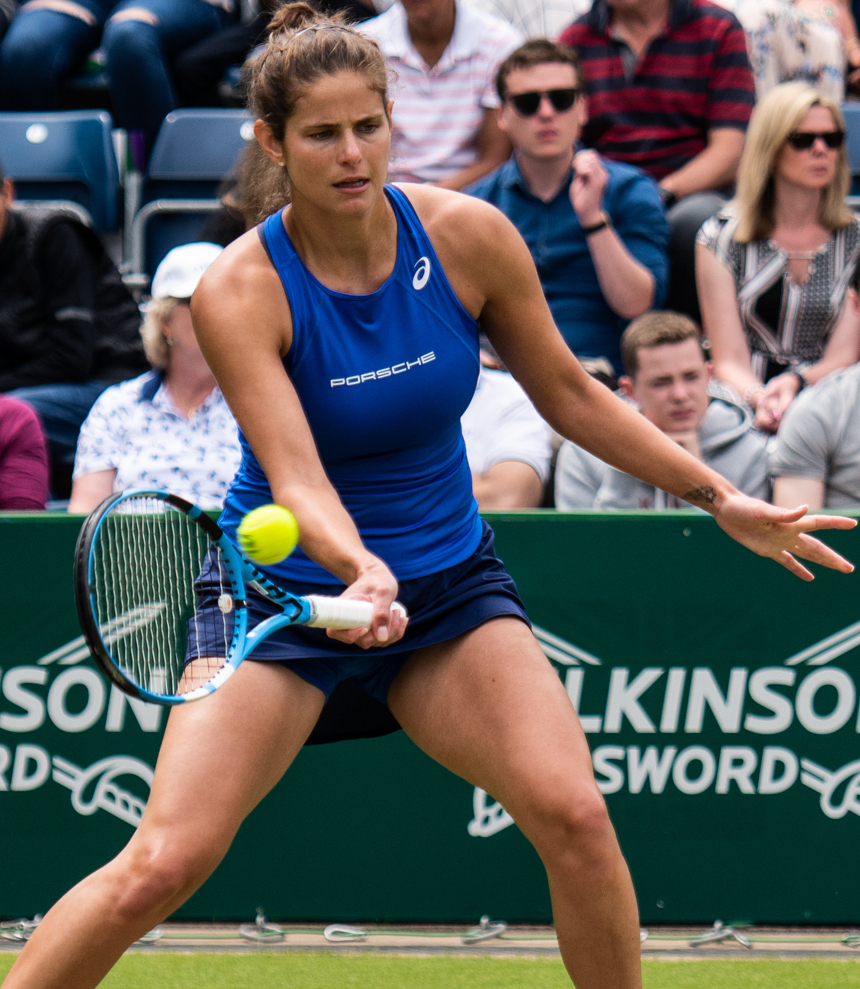
Görges at the 2019 Birmingham Classic

Görges won her second Auckland Open title by beating Canadian Bianca Andreescu in the final. She then headed to Melbourne where, as 14th seed, she was beaten in the first round of the Australian Open by Danielle Collins.

In June, Görges reached the final in Birmingham where she lost to Ashleigh Barty who became the new No. 1 after this tournament. At Wimbledon, Görges defeated Elena-Gabriela Ruse and Varvara Flink before losing in the third round to Serena Williams, in a rematch of the previous year's semifinal. At the US Open, Görges defeated Natalia Vikhlyantseva, Francesca Di Lorenzo, and Kiki Bertens to reach the fourth round, where she lost to Donna Vekić, despite having a match point in the second set.

Görges attempted to defend her title at Luxembourg, and reached the final after defeating Misaki Doi, Sorana Cîrstea, Monica Puig, and Elena Rybakina. However, she fell to an in form Jeļena Ostapenko in the final, in straight sets.

=== 2020: Lowest ranking since 2016, end of career ===
Görges defeated Greetje Minnen and Jil Teichmann to reach the quarterfinals in her Auckland Open title defence, but she lost to Caroline Wozniacki in the quarterfinals in straight sets. Following this loss, she fell to No. 38. She partnered Caroline Garcia in doubles, and reached the quarterfinals, where they fell to eventual champions Asia Muhammad and Taylor Townsend. At Adelaide, she defeated Priscilla Hon, before falling to Belinda Bencic in two tight sets. At Melbourne, she defeated Viktória Kužmová and 13th seed Petra Martić, before being defeated by Alison Riske in three sets. Following the Australian Open, Görges' ranking rose to No. 31. After failing to qualify for Dubai, losing to Sorana Cîrstea in the second qualifying round, Görges participated in Doha, where she lost in the first round to Maria Sakkari.

Görges opted to withdraw from the US Open season, citing safety concerns due to the COVID-19 pandemic. Her first tournament following the suspension of the WTA Tour was at Rome, where she lost to Danka Kovinić in the first round, winning just one game. She next participated at the French Open, where she defeated Riske in the first round, before losing to Laura Siegemund in the second. Following these tournaments, Görges' ranking fell to No. 45, her lowest ranking since 2016. On 21 October, Görges announced her immediate retirement from the tour on her website.

== Career statistics ==
=== Grand Slam singles performance timeline ===
Key
W	F	SF	QF	#R	RR	Q#	DNQ	A	NH

(W) winner; (F) finalist; (SF) semifinalist; (QF) quarterfinalist; (#R) rounds 4, 3, 2, 1; (RR) round-robin stage; (Q#) qualification round; (DNQ) did not qualify; (A) absent; (NH) not held; (SR) strike rate (events won / competed); (W–L) win–loss record.

Tournament	2006	2007	2008	2009	2010	2011	2012	2013	2014	2015	2016	2017	2018	2019	2020	SR	W–L
Australian Open	A	A	Q2	1R	2R	3R	4R	4R	2R	4R	2R	2R	2R	1R	3R	0 / 12	18–12
French Open	A	A	Q3	1R	2R	3R	3R	1R	2R	4R	2R	1R	3R	1R	2R	0 / 12	13–12
Wimbledon	A	A	2R	1R	1R	3R	3R	1R	1R	1R	1R	1R	SF	3R	NH	0 / 12	12–12
US Open	A	1R	1R	1R	2R	3R	1R	1R	1R	1R	2R	4R	2R	4R	A	0 / 13	11–13
Overall win–loss	0–0	0–1	1–2	0–4	3–4	8–4	7–4	3–4	2–4	6–4	3–4	4–4	9–4	5–4	3–2	0 / 49	54–49
