= WTA Auckland Open =

ASB Classic

WTA Tour
- Founded: 1956; 70 years ago
- Location: Auckland; New Zealand
- Venue: ASB Tennis Centre
- Category: WTA 250
- Surface: Hard (Plexicushion) - outdoors
- Draw: 32S / 24Q / 16D
- Prize money: US$283,347 (2026)
- Website: asbclassic.co.nz

Current champions (2026)
- Singles: (Ukraine) Elina Svitolina
- Doubles: (China) Guo Hanyu (France) Kristina Mladenovic

The WTA Auckland Open, known as the ASB Classic (sponsored by ASB Bank), is a professional women's tennis tournament in Auckland, New Zealand. The tournament is played annually, in the first week of January, at the ASB Tennis Centre in the suburb of Parnell, just east of the Central Business District. It is an International level tournament in the Women's Tennis Association (WTA) World Tour. The equivalent men's event, the ATP Auckland Open, is played in the following week, immediately ahead of the first Grand Slam tournament of the season, the Australian Open.

The ASB Classic returned in 2023 after the 2021 and 2022 events were cancelled due to the COVID-19 pandemic owing travel restrictions for international visitors to New Zealand.

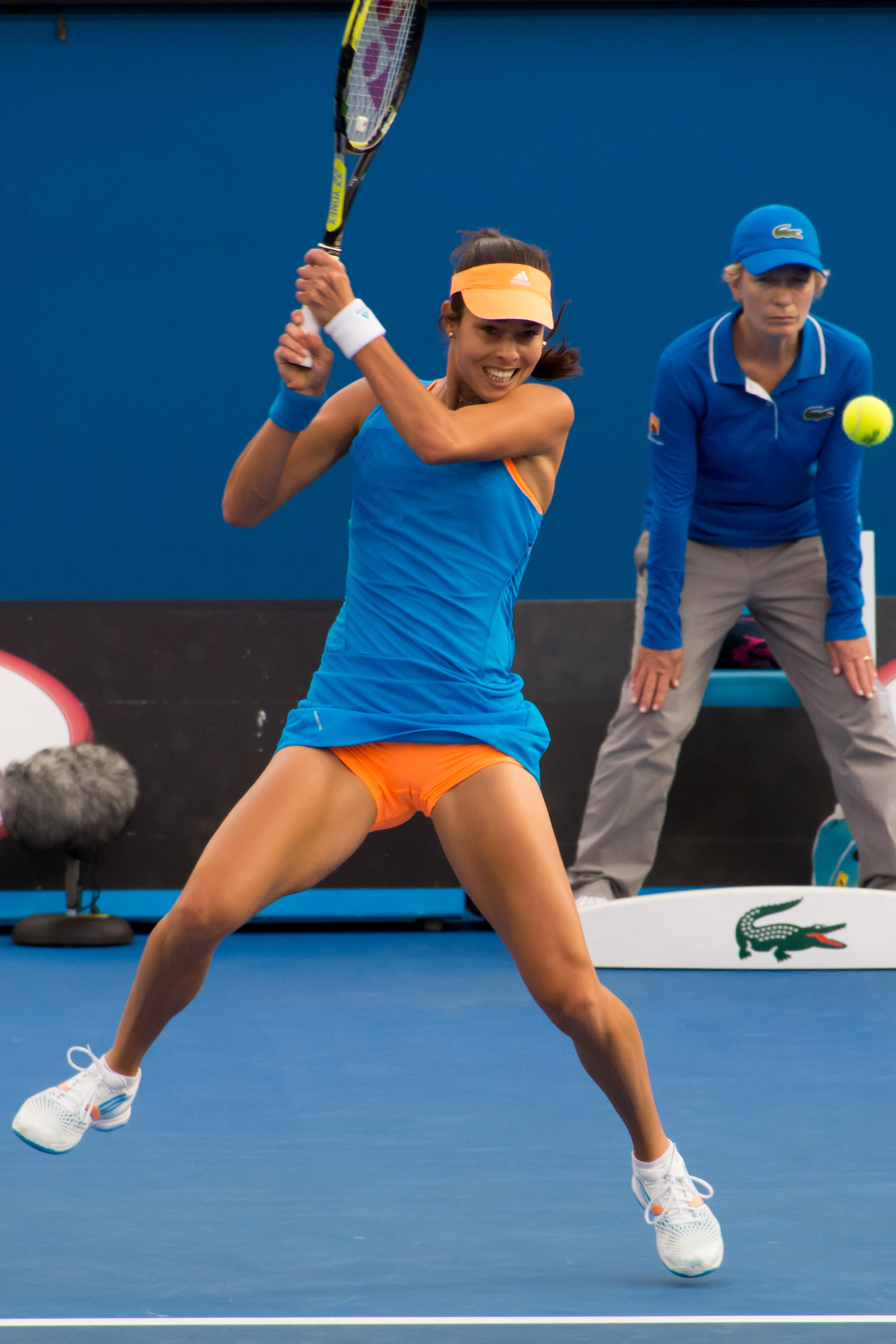
Ana Ivanovic of Serbia was the 2014 singles champion

== History ==
In 1886 the first open tournament held in Auckland was the Auckland Championships it was the precursor event to this one, but was not always staged. In the 1920s major new tennis venues were built in Auckland for the Auckland Lawn Tennis Association (now called Tennis Auckland), as well as Wellington and Christchurch comprising both grass and hard courts. In 1920 when the Auckland Lawn Tennis Association was looking for a permanent base, the only available site was a tip in Stanley Street. Undeterred, the local clubs raised the-then enormous sum of 1,800 pounds to prepare the site and build new courts. For the next 30 years the Tennis Centre in Stanley Street was home to local tennis matches. In 1942 the Auckland Championships were discontinued. In 1954 a second version of the Auckland Championships was revived that is still being staged today.

In 1956 Auckland hosted its first new permanent international tournament, known as the 'Auckland Invitation'. In 1959 the tournament was renamed as the New Zealand Invitation before returning to its former name in 1960. By the 1960s the shuttle bus fare from town to Stanley Street was sixpence. Admission was five shillings for the first three days and 7/6 for finals and semifinals – a whole tournament for the equivalent of $4. By the 1970s, 25 cents got you all-day parking next door at Carlaw Park. The tournament was played on outdoor grass courts from its inaugural edition in 1956 until 1977, switching to hard courts in 1978.

In 1963 this event was rebranded as the Auckland Wills International tournament. In 1969 its official name was altered again to the New Zealand Open. In 1971 its official name was changed to the New Zealand Centennial Open for one year only before returning to its former name until 1981 when the event was separated into the ATP Auckland Open for men and the WTA Auckland Open for women. Between 1979 and 1989 the men's editions of the tournament were part of the Grand Prix tennis circuit.

From 1969, the first edition in the open era of tennis, until 1981 the joint tournament was known under its sponsored name 'Benson and Hedges Open'. When the event was split into two tournaments the men's sponsorship continued as the Benson and Hedges Open. Then from 1998 until 2015 it was named the 'Heineken Open'. There was no women's events for the years 1983 to 1984 and 1986. In 1987 the women's event resumed and its sponsorship name was the Nutri-Metics Open until 1989, then called the Nutri-Metics International in 1990, then the Nutri-Metics Bendon Classic from 1991 to 1992, then the Amway Classic from 1993 to 1996. In 1997 it was branded as the ASB Classic a women's tournament.

After being separated for 34 years, the WTA and ATP merged the event in 2016 and both tournaments are now known collectively as the ASB Classic. Heineken will still be a sponsor but will have a diminished role in anticipation of new tennis regulations restricting alcohol sponsorship.

Both the 2021 and 2022 Auckland Open were cancelled due to the COVID-19 pandemic. In regards to the 2022 cancellation, organizers cited New Zealand's strict quarantine rules as making it intractable for players, officials, and all other required staff to be admitted into the country.

== Finals ==
=== Singles ===
For historical winners of this event see Auckland Championships 1886–1942
Year	Champions	Runners-up	Score
Auckland Invitation
1956	(Australia) Mary Bevis Hawton	(Australia) Thelma Coyne Long	8–6, 10–8
1957	(Australia) Margaret Hellyer	(New Zealand) Ruia Morrison	6–4, 6–4
1958	(United Kingdom) Angela Mortimer	(New Zealand) Ruia Morrison	6–2, 6–1
New Zealand Invitation
1959	(New Zealand) Ruia Morrison	(Australia) Betty Holstein	6–4, 6–4
Auckland Invitation
1960	(New Zealand) Ruia Morrison (2)	(Australia) Margaret Smith	6–2, 6–4
1961	(Australia) Jan Lehane	(New Zealand) Ruia Morrison	6–0, 6–3
1962	(United States) Darlene Hard	(New Zealand) Ruia Morrison	7–5, 7–5
Auckland Wills International
1963	(Australia) Lesley Turner	(New Zealand) Ruia Morrison-Davy	6–2, 6–1
1964	(Australia) Margaret Smith	(Australia) Jan Lehane	6–4, 3–6, 6–0
1965	(United Kingdom) Rita Bentley	(Australia) Jill Blackman	6–4, 6–3
1966	(Australia) Margaret Smith (2)	(Australia) Kerry Melville	6–1, 6–1
1967	(United States) Rosie Casals	(France) Françoise Dürr	6–2, 7–5
1968	(Australia) Kerry Melville	(Australia) Gail Sherriff	8–6, 6–1
↓ Open Era ↓
New Zealand Open
1969	(United Kingdom) Ann Haydon Jones	(Australia) Karen Krantzcke	6–1, 6–1
1970	(United Kingdom) Ann Haydon Jones (2)	(Australia) Kerry Melville	0–6, 6–4, 6–1
New Zealand Centennial Open
1971	(Australia) Margaret Smith Court (3)	(Australia) Evonne Goolagong	3–6, 7–6, 6–2
New Zealand Open
1972	(Australia) Kerry Melville	(United States) Rosie Casals	6–2, 6–0
1973	(Australia) Evonne Goolagong	(New Zealand) Marilyn Pryde	6–0 6–1
1974	(Australia) Evonne Goolagong (2)	(United States) Ann Kiyomura	6–3, 6–1
1975	(Australia) Evonne Goolagong (3)	(United Kingdom) Linda Mottram	6–2, 7–5
1976	(United Kingdom) Sue Barker	(West Germany) Helga Niessen Masthoff	6–5, rained out title shared
1977	(West Germany) Heidi Eisterlehner	(Australia) Karen Krantzcke	6–4, 6–4
1978	(Sweden) Helena Anliot	(Australia) Marilyn Tesch	6–4, 6–3
1979	(Australia) Pam Whytcross	(New Zealand) Brenda Perry	6–3, 7–5
WTA Auckland Open
1980	(United States) Janet Newberry	(New Zealand) Judy Connor Chaloner	6–2, 6–1
1981	(Australia) Pam Whytcross (2)	(New Zealand) Chris Newton	3–6, 6–4, 6–1
1982	(Germany) Susan Hagey	(New Zealand) Belinda Cordwell	6–4, 6–2
↓ Category 1 ↓
1985	(United Kingdom) Anne Hobbs	(Australia) Louise Field	6–4, 6–2
1986	Not held		
1987	(United States) Gretchen Magers	(United States) Terry Phelps	6–2, 6–3
1988	(United States) Patty Fendick	(United Kingdom) Sara Gomer	6–3, 7–6
1989	(United States) Patty Fendick (2)	(New Zealand) Belinda Cordwell	6–2, 6–0
↓ Tier V ↓
1990	(Soviet Union) Leila Meskhi	(Belgium) Sabine Appelmans	6–1, 6–0
1991	(Czechoslovakia) Eva Švíglerová	(Czechoslovakia) Andrea Strnadová	6–2, 0–6, 6–1
1992	(United States) Robin White	(Czechoslovakia) Andrea Strnadová	6–0, 6–0
↓ Tier IV ↓
1993	(South Africa) Elna Reinach	(United States) Caroline Kuhlman	6–0, 6–0
1994	(United States) Ginger Helgeson-Nielsen	(Argentina) Inés Gorrochategui	7–6^{(7–4)}, 6–3
1995	(Australia) Nicole Bradtke	(United States) Ginger Helgeson-Nielsen	3–6, 6–2, 6–1
1996	(United States) Sandra Cacic	(Austria) Barbara Paulus	6–3, 1–6, 6–4
1997	(Austria) Marion Maruska	(Austria) Judith Wiesner	6–3, 6–1
1998	(Belgium) Dominique van Roost	(Italy) Silvia Farina	4–6, 7–6, 7–5
1999	(France) Julie Halard-Decugis	(Belgium) Dominique van Roost	6–4, 6–1
2000	(Luxembourg) Anne Kremer	(Zimbabwe) Cara Black	6–4, 6–4
↓ Tier V ↓
2001	(United States) Meilen Tu	(Argentina) Paola Suárez	7–6^{(10–8)}, 6–2
↓ Tier IV ↓
2002	(Israel) Anna Smashnova	(Russia) Tatiana Panova	6–2, 6–2
2003	(Greece) Eleni Daniilidou	(South Korea) Cho Yoon-jeong	6–4, 4–6, 7–6^{2}
2004	(Greece) Eleni Daniilidou (2)	(United States) Ashley Harkleroad	6–3, 6–2
2005	(Slovenia) Katarina Srebotnik	(Japan) Shinobu Asagoe	5–7, 7–5, 6–4
2006	(France) Marion Bartoli	(Russia) Vera Zvonareva	6–2, 6–2
2007	(Serbia) Jelena Janković	(Russia) Vera Zvonareva	7–6^{(11–9)}, 5–7, 6–3
2008	(United States) Lindsay Davenport	(France) Aravane Rezaï	6–2, 6–2
↓ International ↓
2009	(Russia) Elena Dementieva	(Russia) Elena Vesnina	6–4, 6–1
2010	(Belgium) Yanina Wickmayer	(Italy) Flavia Pennetta	6–3, 6–2
2011	(Hungary) Gréta Arn	(Belgium) Yanina Wickmayer	6–3, 6–3
2012	(China) Zheng Jie	(Italy) Flavia Pennetta	2–6, 6–3, 2–0 Ret.
2013	(Poland) Agnieszka Radwańska	(Belgium) Yanina Wickmayer	6–4, 6–4
2014	(Serbia) Ana Ivanovic	(United States) Venus Williams	6–2, 5–7, 6–4
2015	(United States) Venus Williams	(Denmark) Caroline Wozniacki	2–6, 6–3, 6–3
Auckland Open
2016	(United States) Sloane Stephens	(Germany) Julia Görges	7–5, 6–2
2017	(United States) Lauren Davis	(Croatia) Ana Konjuh	6–3, 6–1
2018	(Germany) Julia Görges	(Denmark) Caroline Wozniacki	6–4, 7–6^{(7–4)}
2019	(Germany) Julia Görges (2)	(Canada) Bianca Andreescu	2–6, 7–5, 6–1
2020	(United States) Serena Williams	(United States) Jessica Pegula	6–3, 6–4
2021	Cancelled due to the COVID-19 pandemic		
2022	Cancelled due to the COVID-19 pandemic		
↓ WTA 250 ↓
2023	(United States) Coco Gauff	(Spain) Rebeka Masarova	6–1, 6–1
2024	(United States) Coco Gauff (2)	(Ukraine) Elina Svitolina	6–7^{(4–7)}, 6–3, 6–3
2025	(Denmark) Clara Tauson	(Japan) Naomi Osaka	4–6 retd.
2026	(Ukraine) Elina Svitolina	(China) Wang Xinyu	6–3, 7–6^{(8–6)}

== Event names ==
This tournament had just its official names from 1956 to 1968 with no sponsorship. In 1969 following the start of the open era sponsorship begins and the event carries both its official designation and its sponsorship title.

=== Official ===
Name	Years	Event type
Auckland Invitation	1956–1958, 1960–1962	combined
New Zealand Invitation	1959	combined
Auckland Wills International	1963–1968	combined
New Zealand Open	1969–1979	combined
Auckland Open	1980–1981	combined
WTA Auckland Open	1982–2015	women's
Auckland Open	2016–current	combined

=== Sponsored ===
The tournaments sponsored names have been as follows:

Name	Years	Event type
Benson & Hedges Open	1969–1970, 1960–1962	combined
Benson & Hedges Centennial Open	1971	combined
Benson & Hedges Open	1972–1981	combined
events separate (1982–2015) & no women events (1983–84, 1986)
Nutri-Metics Open	1987–1989	women's
Nutri-Metics International	1990	women's
Nutri-Metics Bendon Classic	1991–1992	women's
Amway Classic	1993–1996	women's
ASB Classic	1997–2015	women's
events combine again (2016)
ASB Classic	2016–current	combined

== See also ==
- List of tennis tournaments
- Auckland Championships – precursor combined tournament to this one (1886–1942) revived in (1954).
- ATP Auckland Open – men's tournament.
