= 2008 ASB Classic – Singles =

Singles
- 2008 ASB Classic

Final
- Champion: (United States) Lindsay Davenport
- Runner-up: (France) Aravane Rezaï
- Score: 6–2, 6–2

Details
- Draw: 32
- Seeds: 8

Events
Singles	Doubles
← 2007 ·	ASB Classic	· 2009 →

Jelena Janković was the defending champion, but chose not to participate that year.

Lindsay Davenport won in the final 6–2, 6–2, against Aravane Rezaï.

== Seeds ==
1. (Russia) Vera Zvonareva (quarterfinals)
2. (Russia) Maria Kirilenko (quarterfinals)
3. (Slovenia) Katarina Srebotnik (quarterfinals)
4. (Netherlands) Michaëlla Krajicek (first round)
5. (Spain) Anabel Medina Garrigues (second round)
6. (Austria) Tamira Paszek (semifinals)
7. (Greece) Eleni Daniilidou (second round)
8. (France) Émilie Loit (first round)

== Draw ==
=== Key ===
- Q = Qualifier
- WC = Wild card
- LL = Lucky loser
- Alt = Alternate
- SE = Special exempt
- PR = Protected ranking
- ITF = ITF entry
- JE = Junior exempt
- w/o = Walkover
- r = Retired
- d = Defaulted
- SR = Special ranking

=== Finals ===
Semifinals
WC	(New Zealand) Marina Erakovic	3	5
(France) Aravane Rezaï	6	7
(United States) Lindsay Davenport	6	6
6	(Austria) Tamira Paszek	4	3

Final
(France) Aravane Rezaï	2	2
(United States) Lindsay Davenport	6	6

=== Top half ===
First round
1	(Russia) V Zvonareva	6	6
WC	(New Zealand) S Jones	0	1
(Sweden) S Arvidsson	6	7
Q	(United States) A Rolle	4	5
WC	(New Zealand) M Erakovic	6	6
WC	(New Zealand) E Barry	1	1
(United States) A Harkleroad	6	6
8	(France) E Loit	4	1
3	(Slovenia) K Srebotnik	6	3
(Russia) A Rodionova	0	0	r
(Japan) A Morigami	5	0
(Austria) Y Meusburger	7	6
Q	(China) S Zhang	3	3
(France) A Rezaï	6	6
Q	(United Kingdom) E Baltacha	1	2
7	(Greece) E Daniilidou	6	6

Second round
1	(Russia) V Zvonareva	6	6
(Sweden) S Arvidsson	2	3
WC	(New Zealand) M Erakovic	7	7
(United States) A Harkleroad	6^{5}	5
3	(Slovenia) K Srebotnik	6	6
(Austria) Y Meusburger	0	1
(France) A Rezaï	7	6
7	(Greece) E Daniilidou	5	4

Quarterfinals
1	(Russia) V Zvonareva	3	6	6^{5}
WC	(New Zealand) M Erakovic	6	2	7
3	(Slovenia) K Srebotnik	1	3
(France) A Rezaï	6	6

Semifinals
WC	(New Zealand) M Erakovic	3	5
(France) A Rezaï	6	7

=== Bottom half ===
First round
5	(Spain) A Medina Garrigues	7	6
(Australia) N Pratt	6^{3}	3
(United States) L Davenport	6	6
(United States) L Granville	2	3
Q	(Russia) V Manasieva	0	5
(France) P Parmentier	6	7
(Italy) S Errani	7	6^{4}	6
4	(Netherlands) M Krajicek	5	7	2
6	(Austria) T Paszek	7	6
(Belgium) Y Wickmayer	6^{7}	1
(France) C Pin	6	6
(Germany) M Müller	3	1
(United States) M Tu	3	5
(Czech Republic) K Zakopalová	6	7
(Estonia) K Kanepi	2	6	3
2	(Russia) M Kirilenko	6	2	6

Second round
5	(Spain) A Medina Garrigues	1	6	0
(United States) L Davenport	6	4	6
(France) P Parmentier	1	2
(Italy) S Errani	6	6
6	(Austria) T Paszek	6	6
(France) C Pin	2	3
(Czech Republic) K Zakopalová	4	1
2	(Russia) M Kirilenko	6	6

Quarterfinals
(United States) L Davenport	6	6
(Italy) S Errani	3	3
6	(Austria) T Paszek	6	6
2	(Russia) M Kirilenko	1	3

Semifinals
(United States) L Davenport	6	6
6	(Austria) T Paszek	4	3

== Qualifying ==
=== Seeds ===
1. (United States) Jill Craybas (second round)
2. (Luxembourg) Anne Kremer (second round)
3. (Argentina) María Emilia Salerni (second round)
4. (Germany) Angelique Kerber (second round)
5. (United States) Lilia Osterloh (qualifying competition)
6. (Ukraine) Mariya Koryttseva (qualifying competition)
7. (Colombia) Catalina Castaño (first round)
8. (United States) Ahsha Rolle (qualified)

=== Qualifiers ===
1. (China) Zhang Shuai
2. (United Kingdom) Elena Baltacha
3. (Russia) Vesna Manasieva
4. (United States) Ahsha Rolle

=== Qualifying draw ===
==== First qualifier ====
First round
1	(United States) Jill Craybas	6	6
WC	(New Zealand) Shona Lee	0	1
(China) Sun Tiantian	6^{9}	3
(China) Zhang Shuai	7^{11}	6
(Czech Republic) Barbora Záhlavová-Strýcová	5	4
(Argentina) Jorgelina Cravero	7	6
WC	(Poland) Klaudia Jans	1	5
5	(United States) Lilia Osterloh	6	7

Second round
1	(United States) Jill Craybas	2	6	5
(China) Zhang Shuai	6	3	7
(Argentina) Jorgelina Cravero	0	1
5	(United States) Lilia Osterloh	6	6

Qualifying competition
(China) Zhang Shuai	6	1	7
5	(United States) Lilia Osterloh	4	6	5

==== Second qualifier ====
First round
2	(Luxembourg) Anne Kremer	6	6
(Slovenia) Maša Zec Peškirič	4	1
(Canada) Marie-Ève Pelletier	5	2
(United Kingdom) Melanie South	7	6
(Czech Republic) Eva Hrdinová	2	3
(United Kingdom) Elena Baltacha	6	6
(Czech Republic) Vladimíra Uhlířová	6	7^{7}
7	(Colombia) Catalina Castaño	3	6^{4}

Second round
2	(Luxembourg) Anne Kremer	2	3
(United Kingdom) Melanie South	6	6
(United Kingdom) Elena Baltacha	6	6
(Czech Republic) Vladimíra Uhlířová	2	0

Qualifying competition
(United Kingdom) Melanie South	5	3
(United Kingdom) Elena Baltacha	7	6

==== Third qualifier ====
First round
3	(Argentina) María Emilia Salerni	6	6
(Japan) Kumiko Iijima	0	1
(Russia) Vesna Manasieva	6	6
(Slovenia) Andreja Klepač	3	1
(Germany) Sabine Lisicki	7^{11}	6
WC	(Germany) Jasmin Wöhr	6^{9}	4
WC	(Poland) Alicja Rosolska	1	2
6	(Ukraine) Mariya Koryttseva	6	6

Second round
3	(Argentina) María Emilia Salerni	6	4	2
(Russia) Vesna Manasieva	4	6	6
(Germany) Sabine Lisicki	4	7^{7}	3
6	(Ukraine) Mariya Koryttseva	6	6^{1}	6

Qualifying competition
(Russia) Vesna Manasieva	3	6	6
6	(Ukraine) Mariya Koryttseva	6	3	1

==== Fourth qualifier ====
First round
4	(Germany) Angelique Kerber	6	6
(Russia) Arina Rodionova	1	3
(Japan) Junri Namigata	4	1
(United Kingdom) Naomi Cavaday	6	6
WC	(New Zealand) Kairangi Vano	2	0
(Japan) Ayumi Morita	6	6
(Chinese Taipei) Chan Chin-wei	4	1
8	(United States) Ahsha Rolle	6	6

Second round
4	(Germany) Angelique Kerber	4	2
(United Kingdom) Naomi Cavaday	6	6
(Japan) Ayumi Morita	1	3
8	(United States) Ahsha Rolle	6	6

Qualifying competition
(United Kingdom) Naomi Cavaday	2	2
8	(United States) Ahsha Rolle	6	6
