= 2008 ASB Classic =

- Date: 31 December – 5 January
- Edition: 23rd
- Category: Tier IV Series
- Surface: Hard / Outdoor
- Location: Auckland, New Zealand
- Venue: ASB Tennis Centre

Champions

Singles
- (United States) Lindsay Davenport

Doubles
- (Ukraine) Mariya Koryttseva / (United States) Lilia Osterloh
← 2007 ·	WTA Auckland Open	· 2009 →

The 2008 ASB Classic was a women's tennis tournament played on outdoor hard courts. It was the 23rd edition of the ASB Classic, and was part of the Tier IV Series of the 2008 WTA Tour. It took place at the ASB Tennis Centre in Auckland, New Zealand, from 31 December 2007 through 5 January 2008.

== Finals ==
=== Singles ===
(United States) Lindsay Davenport defeated (France) Aravane Rezaï, 6–2, 6–2

- It was Lindsay Davenport's 1st title of the year, and her 54th overall.

=== Doubles ===
(Ukraine) Mariya Koryttseva / (United States) Lilia Osterloh defeated (Germany) Martina Müller / (Czech Republic) Barbora Záhlavová-Strýcová, 6–3, 6–4

== See also ==
- 2008 Heineken Open – men's tournament
