= 2009 ASB Classic – Doubles =

Doubles
- 2009 ASB Classic

Final
- Champions: (France) Nathalie Dechy (Italy) Mara Santangelo
- Runners-up: (Spain) Nuria Llagostera Vives (Spain) Arantxa Parra Santonja
- Score: 4–6, 7–6^{(7–3)}, [12–10]

Details
- Draw: 16
- Seeds: 4

Events
| Singles | Doubles |
| ← 2008 · | WTA Auckland Open | · 2010 → |

Mariya Koryttseva and Lilia Osterloh were the defending champions, but chose not to participate that year.

In the final, Nathalie Dechy and Mara Santangelo defeated Nuria Llagostera Vives and Arantxa Parra Santonja, 4–6, 7–6^{(7–3)}, [12–10].

== Seeds ==
1. (United States) Jill Craybas / (New Zealand) Marina Erakovic (first round)
2. (Israel) Shahar Pe'er / (Denmark) Caroline Wozniacki (quarterfinals)
3. (Belarus) Ekaterina Dzehalevich / (Czech Republic) Vladimíra Uhlířová (first round)
4. (Chinese Taipei) Chan Yung-jan / (Russia) Anastasia Pavlyuchenkova (semifinals)

== Draw ==
=== Key ===
- Q = Qualifier
- WC = Wild card
- LL = Lucky loser
- Alt = Alternate
- SE = Special exempt
- PR = Protected ranking
- ITF = ITF entry
- JE = Junior exempt
- w/o = Walkover
- r = Retired
- d = Defaulted
- SR = Special ranking

=== Draw ===
First round
1 | (United States) J Craybas (New Zealand) M Erakovic | 4 | 2
(Spain) N Llagostera Vives (Spain) A Parra Santonja | 6 | 6
(United Kingdom) S Borwell (Germany) M Müller | 0 | 7 | [10]
ALT | (Poland) M Domachowska (Japan) A Nakamura | 6 | 5 | [7]
4 | (Chinese Taipei) Y-j Chan (Russia) A Pavlyuchenkova | 6 | 6
(Turkey) İ Şenoğlu (Germany) J Wöhr | 2 | 2
WC | (Russia) E Dementieva (Russia) E Vesnina | 6 | 6
(Latvia) L Dekmeijere (South Africa) N Grandin | 1 | 3
(Romania) E Gallovits (Czech Republic) E Hrdinová | 6 | 6
WC | (New Zealand) S Lee (New Zealand) K Vano | 3 | 4
(France) N Dechy (Italy) M Santangelo | 6 | 6
3 | (Belarus) E Dzehalevich (Czech Republic) V Uhlířová | 4 | 4
(United States) J Ditty (United States) C Gullickson | 6 | 6
(United States) R Kops-Jones (United States) A Spears | 1 | 3
(Argentina) B Jozami (India) S Uberoi | 2 | 3
2 | (Israel) S Pe'er (Denmark) C Wozniacki | 6 | 6

Quarterfinals
(Spain) N Llagostera Vives (Spain) A Parra Santonja | 6 | 6
(United Kingdom) S Borwell (Germany) M Müller | 3 | 1
4 | (Chinese Taipei) Y-j Chan (Russia) A Pavlyuchenkova | 6 | 5 | [14]
WC | (Russia) E Dementieva (Russia) E Vesnina | 0 | 7 | [12]
(Romania) E Gallovits (Czech Republic) E Hrdinová | 2 | 4
(France) N Dechy (Italy) M Santangelo | 6 | 6
(United States) J Ditty (United States) C Gullickson | 7 | 1 | [10]
2 | (Israel) S Pe'er (Denmark) C Wozniacki | 6^{4} | 6 | [4]

Semifinals
(Spain) N Llagostera Vives (Spain) A Parra Santonja | 6 | 6
4 | (Chinese Taipei) Y-j Chan (Russia) A Pavlyuchenkova | 3 | 4
(France) N Dechy (Italy) M Santangelo | 6 | 6
(United States) J Ditty (United States) C Gullickson | 2 | 4

Final
(Spain) N Llagostera Vives (Spain) A Parra Santonja | 6 | 6^{3} | [10]
(France) N Dechy (Italy) M Santangelo | 4 | 7 | [12]
