= 2007 ASB Classic – Singles =

Singles
- 2007 ASB Classic

Final
- Champion: (Serbia) Jelena Janković
- Runner-up: (Russia) Vera Zvonareva
- Score: 7–6^{(11–9)}, 5–7, 6–3

Details
- Draw: 32
- Seeds: 8

Events
Singles	Doubles
- ASB Classic

Marion Bartoli was the defending champion, but lost in the second round against Émilie Loit.

Jelena Janković won the title, beating Vera Zvonareva 7–6^{(11–9)}, 5–7, 6–3 in the final.

== Draw ==
=== Seeds ===
1. (Serbia) Jelena Janković (champion)
2. (Russia) Anastasia Myskina (first round)
3. (Slovakia) Daniela Hantuchová (second round)
4. (France) Marion Bartoli (second round)
5. (Russia) Vera Zvonareva (final)
6. (Germany) Martina Müller (first round)
7. (Greece) Eleni Daniilidou (quarterfinals)
8. (United States) Shenay Perry (first round)

Key

- Q = Qualifier
- WC = Wild card
- LL = Lucky loser
- Alt = Alternate
- ITF = ITF entry
- PR = Protected ranking
- SR = Special ranking
- SE = Special exempt
- JE = Junior exempt
- JR = Junior Accelerator Programme entrant
- CO = College Accelerator Programme entrant
- NG = Next Gen Accelerator Program entrant
- w/o = Walkover
- r = Retired
- d = Defaulted

=== Finals ===
Semifinals
1	(Serbia) Jelena Janković	3
(France) Camille Pin	0^{r}
5	(Russia) Vera Zvonareva	6	7
(United States) Jill Craybas	3	5

Final
1	(Serbia) Jelena Janković	7	5	6
5	(Russia) Vera Zvonareva	6^{9}	7	3

=== Top half ===
First round
1	(Serbia) J Janković	6	6
(Germany) J Schruff	3	4
LL	(France) M Johansson	6^{4}	1
(Finland) E Laine	7	6
WC	(New Zealand) M Erakovic	6	4	7
Q	(United States) M Tu	3	6	5
(Croatia) J Kostanić	3	6	1
7	(Greece) E Daniilidou	6	4	6
4	(France) M Bartoli	7	6
(Japan) A Morita	6^{4}	3
(Czech Republic) E Birnerová	1	1
(France) É Loit	6	6
Q	(Austria) Y Meusburger	7	6
(Russia) E Bychkova	5	0
(France) C Pin	6	5	6
8	(United States) S Perry	3	7	2

Second round
1	(Serbia) J Janković	6	6
(Finland) E Laine	2	1
WC	(New Zealand) M Erakovic	4	6	4
7	(Greece) E Daniilidou	6	4	6
4	(France) M Bartoli	5	4
(France) É Loit	7	6
Q	(Austria) Y Meusburger	6	3	3
(France) C Pin	2	6	6

Quarterfinals
1	(Serbia) J Janković	6	6
7	(Greece) E Daniilidou	3	4
(France) É Loit	3	3
(France) C Pin	6	6

Semifinals
1	(Serbia) J Janković	3
(France) C Pin	0^{r}

=== Bottom half ===
First round
5	(Russia) V Zvonareva	5	6	6
Q	(United States) L Osterloh	7	2	3
(Italy) R Oprandi	3	4
(United States) L Granville	6	6
Q	(France) V Razzano	7	6
(Estonia) K Kanepi	6^{1}	1
(Slovakia) D Cibulková	1	6	2
3	(Slovakia) D Hantuchová	6	3	6
6	(Germany) M Müller	6	1	1
(Argentina) P Suárez	3	6	6
WC	(New Zealand) L Baker	1	1
(China) T Sun	6	6
(United States) J Craybas	7	6
(Japan) A Nakamura	5	2
(Argentina) G Dulko	6	6^{4}	6
2	(Russia) A Myskina	1	7	2

Second round
5	(Russia) V Zvonareva	6	6
(United States) L Granville	3	4
Q	(France) V Razzano	6	7
3	(Slovakia) D Hantuchová	1	5
(Argentina) P Suárez	7	6
(China) T Sun	5	4
(United States) J Craybas	6	7
(Argentina) G Dulko	3	5

Quarterfinals
5	(Russia) V Zvonareva	7	2
Q	(France) V Razzano	5	0^{r}
(Argentina) P Suárez	3	6^{4}
(United States) J Craybas	6	7

Semifinals
5	(Russia) V Zvonareva	6	7
(United States) J Craybas	3	5
