= 2008 ASB Classic – Doubles =

Doubles
- 2008 ASB Classic

Final
- Champions: (Ukraine) Mariya Koryttseva (United States) Lilia Osterloh
- Runners-up: (Germany) Martina Müller (Czech Republic) Barbora Záhlavová-Strýcová
- Score: 6–3, 6–4

Details
- Draw: 16
- Seeds: 4

Events
Singles	Doubles
← 2007 ·	WTA Auckland Open	· 2009 →

Janette Husárová and Paola Suárez were the defending champions, but chose not to participate that year.

Mariya Koryttseva and Lilia Osterloh won in the final 6–3, 6–4, against Martina Müller and Barbora Záhlavová-Strýcová.

== Seeds ==
1. (France) Émilie Loit / (United States) Meilen Tu (semifinals)
2. (United States) Laura Granville / (Czech Republic) Vladimíra Uhlířová (semifinals)
3. (Colombia) Catalina Castaño / (China) Tiantian Sun (second round)
4. (Greece) Eleni Daniilidou / (Germany) Jasmin Wöhr (second round)

== Draw ==
=== Key ===
- Q = Qualifier
- WC = Wild card
- LL = Lucky loser
- Alt = Alternate
- SE = Special exempt
- PR = Protected ranking
- ITF = ITF entry
- JE = Junior exempt
- w/o = Walkover
- r = Retired
- d = Defaulted
- SR = Special ranking

=== Draw ===
First round
1	(France) É Loit (United States) M Tu	6	5	[11]
(Japan) A Morita (Japan) J Namigata	3	7	[9]
(New Zealand) M Erakovic (Netherlands) M Krajicek	6	7
WC	(New Zealand) S Jones (United States) A Rolle	2	5
4	(Greece) E Daniilidou (Germany) J Wöhr	6	6
(United States) A Harkleroad (Japan) A Morigami	3	4
(Ukraine) M Koryttseva (United States) L Osterloh	6	6
(Poland) K Jans (Poland) A Rosolska	2	4
(Germany) M Müller (Czech Republic) B Záhlavová-Strýcová	6	6
(Czech Republic) E Hrdinová (Canada) M-È Pelletier	4	3
(Spain) A Megina Garrigues (Argentina) ME Salerni	3	6	[6]
3	(Colombia) C Castaño (China) T Sun	6	4	[10]
(Slovenia) A Klepač (Belgium) Y Wickmayer	2	3
(Argentina) J Cravero (Italy) S Errani	6	6
(Russia) A Rodionova (Russia) A Rodionova	2	0
2	(United States) L Granville (Czech Republic) V Uhlířová	6	6

Quarterfinals
1	(France) É Loit (United States) M Tu	w/o
(New Zealand) M Erakovic (Netherlands) M Krajicek
4	(Greece) E Daniilidou (Germany) J Wöhr	3	4
(Ukraine) M Koryttseva (United States) L Osterloh	6	6
(Germany) M Müller (Czech Republic) B Záhlavová-Strýcová	2	6	[10]
3	(Colombia) C Castaño (China) T Sun	6	4	[6]
(Argentina) J Cravero (Italy) S Errani	6	5	[11]
2	(United States) L Granville (Czech Republic) V Uhlířová	4	7	[13]

Semifinals
1	(France) É Loit (United States) M Tu	6	4	[6]
(Ukraine) M Koryttseva (United States) L Osterloh	2	6	[10]
(Germany) M Müller (Czech Republic) B Záhlavová-Strýcová	6	6
2	(United States) L Granville (Czech Republic) V Uhlířová	4	4

Final
(Ukraine) M Koryttseva (United States) L Osterloh	6	6
(Germany) M Müller (Czech Republic) B Záhlavová-Strýcová	3	4
