= Jelenin svet =

- Theatrical poster
- Directed by: Tanja Brzaković
- Written by: Tanja Brzaković
- Produced by: Tanja Brzaković; Nebojsa Miljkovic
- Starring: Jelena Janković; Snežana Janković; Ricardo Sánchez
- Cinematography: Miona Bogovic; Kathleen Herbst
- Edited by: Tatjana Brzakovic; Branka Pavlovic
- Music by: Janja Lončar
- Production company: Talas film
- Distributed by: Serbian theatrical: Art Vista; Worldwide: WTA Tour
- Release date: November 12, 2008 (Belgrade, Serbia)
- Running time: 80 minutes
- Countries: Serbia; Germany
- Languages: Serbian; Subtitle: English; Russian
- Budget: $40,000

Jelenin svet (Jelena's World) is a 2008 independent documentary film written and directed by Tanja Brzaković, about former World No. 1 female tennis player, Jelena Janković.

== Background ==
The film follows Jelena Janković over a 14-month period, and includes tennis tournaments in Madrid and Berlin, as well as her visits to her home in Belgrade.

At the beginning of the documentary, Janković was ranked as third best tennis player in the world. The film follows her regime as she prepares for various meets, deals with maintaining her diet, trains, meets with fans, and begins her matches.

== Cast ==
- Jelena Janković as herself
- Snežana Janković as herself (Jelena's mother)
- Ricardo Sánchez as himself (Jelena's coach)

In tennis matches:

- Anna Chakvetadze
- Elena Dementieva
- Justine Henin
- Ana Ivanovic
- Svetlana Kuznetsova

== Reception ==
When the film premiered in Belgrade on November 12, 2008, it outsold the James Bond film Quantum of Solace which opened there that same weekend, bumping the Bond film to second place in the Serbian box office.

In speaking about the film, Politika made note that full-length theatrically released documentary films about Serbian athletes are rare. They appreciated that Jelenin svet celebrated the efforts of one of the best among the best in the world, and that the film was able to document Jelena Janković's rise from third-best to world's best. They wrote that the film is dynamic, witty and cheerful in its portrait of Janković, and that it allows viewers to better understand the subject of the film.
