= 2009 ASB Classic – Singles =

Singles
- 2009 ASB Classic

Final
- Champion: (Russia) Elena Dementieva
- Runner-up: (Russia) Elena Vesnina
- Score: 6–4, 6–1

Details
- Draw: 32
- Seeds: 8

Events
| Singles | Doubles |
| ← 2008 · | WTA Auckland Open | · 2010 → |

Lindsay Davenport was the defending champion, but chose not to participate that year due to her pregnancy.

Elena Dementieva won in the final 6–4, 6–1, against Elena Vesnina.

== Seeds ==
1. (Russia) Elena Dementieva (champion)
2. (Denmark) Caroline Wozniacki (quarterfinals)
3. (Spain) Anabel Medina Garrigues (second round)
4. (Canada) Aleksandra Wozniak (second round)
5. (Israel) Shahar Pe'er (quarterfinals)
6. (Czech Republic) Nicole Vaidišová (second round)
7. (Russia) Anastasia Pavlyuchenkova (second round)
8. (Spain) Carla Suárez Navarro (second round)

== Draw ==
Key

- Q = Qualifier
- WC = Wild card
- LL = Lucky loser
- Alt = Alternate
- ITF = ITF entry
- PR = Protected ranking
- SR = Special ranking
- SE = Special exempt
- JE = Junior exempt
- JR = Junior Accelerator Programme entrant
- CO = College Accelerator Programme entrant
- NG = Next Gen Accelerator Program entrant
- w/o = Walkover
- r = Retired
- d = Defaulted

=== Finals ===
Semifinals
1 | (Russia) Elena Dementieva | 6 | 6
(France) Aravane Rezaï | 2 | 2
(United Kingdom) Anne Keothavong | 7 | 1 | 5
(Russia) Elena Vesnina | 6^{3} | 6 | 7

Final
1 | (Russia) Elena Dementieva | 6 | 6
(Russia) Elena Vesnina | 4 | 1

=== Top half ===
First round
1 | (Russia) E Dementieva | 7 | 6
(Chinese Taipei) Y-j Chan | 5 | 3
(Spain) N Llagostera Vives | 5 | 4
(New Zealand) M Erakovic | 7 | 6
(France) V Razzano | 6 | 2 | 3
(Czech Republic) B Záhlavová-Strýcová | 1 | 6 | 6
(Czech Republic) P Cetkovská | 6^{4} | 2
5 | (Israel) S Pe'er | 7 | 6
3 | (Spain) A Medina Garrigues | 7 | 6
(Italy) M Santangelo | 5 | 0
(Czech Republic) K Zakopalová | 6 | 2 | 5
(Romania) E Gallovits | 3 | 6 | 7
(France) A Rezaï | 6 | 3 | 6
WC | (Greece) E Daniilidou | 3 | 6 | 3
Q | (Germany) K Barrois | 3 | 1
7 | (Russia) A Pavlyuchenkova | 6 | 6

Second round
1 | (Russia) E Dementieva | 6 | 6
(New Zealand) M Erakovic | 2 | 3
(Czech Republic) B Záhlavová-Strýcová | 3 | 6 | 2
5 | (Israel) S Pe'er | 6 | 4 | 6
3 | (Spain) A Medina Garrigues | 3 | 3
(Romania) E Gallovits | 6 | 6
(France) A Rezaï | 6 | 6
7 | (Russia) A Pavlyuchenkova | 2 | 3

Quarterfinals
1 | (Russia) E Dementieva | 6 | 6
5 | (Israel) S Pe'er | 3 | 1
(Romania) E Gallovits | 3 | 2
(France) A Rezaï | 6 | 6

Semifinals
1 | (Russia) E Dementieva | 6 | 6
(France) A Rezaï | 2 | 2

=== Bottom half ===
First round
8 | (Spain) C Suárez Navarro | 6 | 6
(France) N Dechy | 4 | 0
(United Kingdom) A Keothavong | 6 | 6
WC | (Croatia) M Lučić | 4 | 2
Q | (Japan) A Morita | 6 | 4 | 6
(Poland) M Domachowska | 4 | 6 | 4
(Slovakia) M Rybáriková | 3 | 7 | 5
4 | (Canada) A Wozniak | 6 | 6^{4} | 7
6 | (Czech Republic) N Vaidišová | 7 | 4 | 7
(Russia) A Kudryavtseva | 6^{3} | 6 | 5
(Russia) E Vesnina | 6 | 6
Q | (Japan) A Nakamura | 1 | 0
WC | (Japan) K Date-Krumm | 4 | 3
(United States) J Craybas | 6 | 6
Q | (Italy) A Brianti | 1 | 0
2 | (Denmark) C Wozniacki | 6 | 6

Second round
8 | (Spain) C Suárez Navarro | 2 | 4
(United Kingdom) A Keothavong | 6 | 6
Q | (Japan) A Morita | 7 | 6
4 | (Canada) A Wozniak | 5 | 2
6 | (Czech Republic) N Vaidišová | 4 | 3
(Russia) E Vesnina | 6 | 6
(United States) J Craybas | 4 | 5
2 | (Denmark) C Wozniacki | 6 | 7

Quarterfinals
(United Kingdom) A Keothavong | 6 | 0
Q | (Japan) A Morita | 0 | 0 | r
(Russia) E Vesnina | 6 | 0 | 6
2 | (Denmark) C Wozniacki | 3 | 6 | 3

Semifinals
(United Kingdom) A Keothavong | 7 | 1 | 5
(Russia) E Vesnina | 6^{3} | 6 | 7
