= 2009 ASB Classic =

- Date: 5–10 January
- Edition: 24th
- Category: WTA International
- Draw: 32S / 16D
- Prize money: $220,000
- Surface: Hard / outdoor
- Location: Auckland, New Zealand
- Venue: ASB Tennis Centre

Champions

Singles
- (Russia) Elena Dementieva

Doubles
- (France) Nathalie Dechy / (Italy) Mara Santangelo
- WTA Auckland Open

The 2009 ASB Classic was a tennis tournament played on outdoor hard courts. It was the 24th edition of the ASB Classic, and was part of the WTA International tournaments of the 2009 WTA Tour. It took place at the ASB Tennis Centre in Auckland, New Zealand, from 5 January until 10 January 2009.

The singles draw is led by WTA No. 4, Luxembourg, Dubai winner, Olympics gold medalist Elena Dementieva, Tokyo, New Haven, Stockholm titlist Caroline Wozniacki and Strasbourg champion, Fes, Portorož runner-up Anabel Medina Garrigues. Also competing are Stanford champion Aleksandra Wozniak, Prague quarter-finalist Shahar Pe'er, Nicole Vaidišová, Anastasia Pavlyuchenkova and Carla Suárez Navarro.

First-seeded Elena Dementieva won the singles title.

== Finals ==
=== Singles ===
(Russia) Elena Dementieva defeated (Russia) Elena Vesnina, 6–4, 6–1

- It was Dementieva's first title of the year and 12th of her career.

=== Doubles ===
(France) Nathalie Dechy / (Italy) Mara Santangelo defeated (Spain) Nuria Llagostera Vives / (Spain) Arantxa Parra Santonja, 4–6, 7–6^{3}, 12–10

== Changes ==
At the 2008 tournament, the courts were changed to a blue Plexicushion surface, replacing the green Rebound Ace. This was consistent with the surface change that was also implemented at the Australian Open.

For the 2009 WTA Tour the ASB Classic was chosen as part of the new 55 tournament calendar. A new tournament director, Brenda Perry, was brought in, and there was also an increase in prize money from $145,000 to $225,000. The event underwent a change in sponsorship, with Zealandia, a New Zealand horticulture firm, becoming a supporting partner.

== Entrants ==
=== Seeds ===
Nadia Petrova, who was set to be the number two seed, was forced to pull out when it was announced that she had contracted viral meningitis in mid-December.

Athlete	Nationality	Ranking	Seeding
Elena Dementieva	Russia	5	1
Caroline Wozniacki	Denmark	12	2
Anabel Medina Garrigues	Spain	22	3
Aleksandra Wozniak	Canada	34	4
Shahar Pe'er	Israel	38	5
Nicole Vaidišová	Czech Republic	41	6
Anastasia Pavlyuchenkova	Russia	45	7
Carla Suárez Navarro	Spain	49	8

=== Other notable entrants ===
The return of Marina Erakovic (a New Zealander) to this event provoked a strong interest from media in the country. In the 2008 event, Erakovic had reached the semifinals, defeating the top seed Vera Zvonareva in the process. Erakovic went on to have the most successful season of her career, despite some poorer results and injuries in the latter half of the year. Commenting on the 2009 tournament, Erakovic said, "Even though the ASB Classic is important and I want to do well in my home town, my sight is set on the Australian Open and to be 100 percent for that." Erakovic had had to rely on a wildcard to gain entry to the previous year's event, but in 2009 was a direct entrant. Another entry which drew attention from the media was that of Mirjana Lučić, who had reached the Wimbledon semifinals ranked 134 in 1999, but had been largely absent from the Tour in the preceding years for personal reasons. Lučić received a wildcard for the main draw.

=== Qualifying ===
The qualifying tournament was played from 3–4 January. Four players received wildcards:

1. (New Zealand) Di Hollands
2. (New Zealand) Aucklander Kairangi
3. (Netherlands) Michaëlla Krajicek
4. (Croatia) Petra Martić

The four players to qualify were Ayumi Morita and Aiko Nakamura (both Japan), German player Kristina Barrois, and Italian Alberta Brianti.

== Review ==
Day by day summaries of the women's singles and doubles events. The singles draw is composed of 32 players, with 8 of these players seeded, while the doubles draw features 16 players, 4 of which are seeded.

=== Day one ===
The singles and doubles events both started on 5 January. In the women's singles, the seeded players who featured on the first day all advanced to the second round. Third seed and WTA #22 Anabel Medina Garrigues beat Italian Mara Santangelo 7–5, 6–0. Fourth seed Aleksandra Wozniak overcame her opponent Magdaléna Rybáriková from Slovakia in three sets, winning 6–3, 6–7(4), 7–5. Shahar Pe'er, the fifth seed from Israel, sealed her passage into the next round with a straight sets triumph against Petra Cetkovská of the Czech Republic. The final seed to go through, Czech Nicole Vaidišová took three sets before triumphing 7–6(3), 4–6, 7–5 against Alla Kudryavtseva of Russia. In other matches, another Czech Barbora Záhlavová-Strýcová beat France's Virginie Razzano 1–6, 6–2, 6–3 to line up a second round match with Pe'er; Romanian Edina Gallovits also found out her opponent would be Medina Garrigues after beating yet another Czech, Klára Zakopalová 3–6, 6–2, 7–5. American Jill Craybas and French Aravane Rezaï recorded victories against Kimiko Date-Krumm and Eleni Daniilidou respectively.

Several matches were played in the doubles event on the first day. The most notable result saw top seeds Jill Craybas (playing her second match of the day following her singles victory) and New Zealander Marina Erakovic knocked out by the Spanish pairing of Nuria Llagostera Vives and Arantxa Parra Santonja 6–4, 6–2. They were the only seeds to fall, with fourth seeds Chan Yung-jan (from Chinese Taipei) and Anastasia Pavlyuchenkova of Russia advancing comfortably with a 6–2, 6–2 win over İpek Şenoğlu of Turkey and German Jasmin Wöhr. Chan and Pavlyuchenkova's win set up a second round match with Russians Elena Dementieva and Elena Vesnina who beat Natalie Grandin from South Africa and Latvia's Līga Dekmeijere 6–1, 6–3.

- Seeded players out (singles): None
- Seeded players out (doubles): Jill Craybas/Marina Erakovic

=== Day two ===
Day 2 saw the completion of the first round of matches in both the singles and doubles competitions. The remaining seeds who were not in action on the first day all won their matches and qualified for round two. During the day session, top seed and ATP no. 4 Russian Elena Dementieva had a far from straight forward match against Chan Yung-jan from Chinese, eventually coming through 7–5, 6–3. The young player from Taipei was hard-hitting but did not have enough to beat Dementieva. Second seed Caroline Wozniacki of Denmark, ranked at a career high of #12, crushed her opponent, Italian qualifier Alberta Brianti 6–1, 6–0 in 56 minutes to achieve a meeting with Jill Craybas. No.8 seed Carla Suárez Navarro from Spain beat Nathalie Dechy 6–4, 6–0. She found out her opponent for round two later in the day, with Anne Keothavong from Great Britain winning 6–4, 6–2 against Croatian wildcard Mirjana Lučić. In other day matches, Elena Vesnina routed qualifier Aiko Nakamura, 6–1, 6–0 and qualifier Ayumi Morita beat Marta Domachowska, 6–4 4–6 6–4. The unseeded Marina Erakovic of New Zealand sealed her place in the second round by beating Nuria Llagostera Vives from Spain 7–5, 6–4. Seventh seed Russian Anastasia Pavlyuchenkova ensured that all eight of the seeds had made it to the second round by winning her match in the night session against German Kristina Barrois 6–3, 6–1.

In doubles, second seeds Shahar Pe'er and Caroline Wozniacki progressed to the quarter-finals by defeating Argentinian Betina Jozami and Indian Shikha Uberoi 6–2, 6–2 but no. 3 seeds Czech Vladimíra Uhlířová and Ekaterina Dzehalevich of Belarus were beaten 6–4, 6–4 by Italian Mara Santangelo and French player Nathalie Dechy, a three-times Grand Slam doubles titlist. In other matches, Sarah Borwell from Great Britain and her partner Martina Müller qualified for the quarter-finals, overcoming the disappointment of a 6–0 first set to take the next two 7–5, 10-7 on champions tiebreak against Aiko Nakamura (Japan) and Marta Domachowska (Poland). Edina Gallovits and Eva Hrdinová defeated Australian wildcards Shona Lee and Kairangi Vano 6–3, 6–4. Finally, in an all American tie, Raquel Kops-Jones and Abigail Spears lost to Julie Ditty and Carly Gullickson 6–1, 6–3 to complete the quarter-final lineup.

- Seeded players out (singles): None
- Seeded players out (doubles): Vladimíra Uhlířová/Ekaterina Dzehalevich

=== Day three ===
After the first round passing without losing any seeds, five were knocked out on day three, all in straight sets, leaving just three seeds qualifying for the quarter-finals. 3rd seed Anabel Medina Garrigues lost to Edina Gallovits 6–3, 6–3. No. 6 seed Nicole Vaidišová was beaten 6–4, 6–3 by Elena Vesnina. Aleksandra Wozniak, the 4th seed, was knocked out by Ayumi Morita 7–5, 6–2, no. 7 Anastasia Pavlyuchenkova failed to progress as she lost 6–2, 6–3 to Aravane Rezaï while Carla Suárez Navarro succumbed to Briton Anne Keothavong who continued her good start to life in the top 60 with a 6–2, 6–4 win. As for the seeds that progressed, top seed Elena Dementieva beat New Zealand's Marina Erakovic 6–2, 6–3; No. 2 seed Caroline Wozniacki narrowly saw off veteran Jill Craybas 6–4, 7–5. 5th seed Shahar Pe'er had to try hard to concentrate on her tennis because an Auckland-based protest group staged protests at her decision not to pull out of the tournament with a war taking place in Gaza. Nevertheless, she became the third seed to progress, beating Barbora Záhlavová-Strýcová in a topsy-turvy match 6–3, 4–6, 6–2.

- Seeded players out (singles): Anabel Medina Garrigues, Aleksandra Wozniak, Nicole Vaidišová, Anastasia Palyuchenkova, Carla Suárez Navarro
- Seeded players out (doubles): Shahar Pe'er/Caroline Wozniacki

=== Day four ===
- Seeded players out (singles): Caroline Wozniacki, Shahar Pe'er
- Seeded players out (doubles): Chan Yung-jan/Anastasia Pavlyuchenkova

=== Day five ===
Day five saw both semi-finals take place in the singles draw. The only seeded player left in the draw, top seeded Russian Elena Dementieva and the world no. 4 as of the start of the tournament was involved in the first match. She faced French player and last year's beaten finalist Aravane Rezaï. Dementieva won the match 6–2, 6–2 in less than an hour.

Later in the day, unseeded Russian Elena Vesnina took on British number 1 and world no. 60 Anne Keothavong, playing in only her second WTA Tour semi-final and whose ranking should improve after her progress during the tournament. Keothavong matched Vesnina for much of the first set, falling behind 5–3 with a single break of serve. But she did not give up and she broke back and then held her service game to level the first set. The set eventually went to a tiebreak, which the British player took 7-3. The second set was a completely different story, Vesnina dropping just one game to win it 6–1. This set up a final-set decider which went with serve until the seventh game when Keothavong felt she had been given a wrong linecall and ended up being broken. She fought back to 5–5 but was broken again in the eleventh. Keothavong managed to save two match points but then, after saving two break points of her own, Vesnina hit an ace to seal victory and complete a match lasting almost two hours.

The second semi-final of the doubles competition was a match between American pair Julie Ditty and Carly Gullickson, and France's Nathalie Dechy partnering Italian Mara Santangelo. Santangelo and Dechy, bidding for their second title as a partnership following Rome Masters victory in 2007 advanced to the final 6–2, 6–4. Their final opponents being Spaniards Nuria Llagostera Vives and Arantxa Parra Santonja.

- Seeded players out (singles): None
- Seeded players out (doubles): None

=== Day six ===
- Seeded players out (singles):
- Seeded players out (doubles):

== See also ==
- 2009 Heineken Open – men's tournament
