= 2007 ASB Classic – Doubles =

Doubles
- 2007 ASB Classic

Final
- Champion: (Slovakia) Janette Husárová (Argentina) Paola Suárez
- Runner-up: (Chinese Taipei) Hsieh Su-wei (India) Shikha Uberoi
- Score: 6–0, 6–

Details
- Draw: 16
- Seeds: 4

Events
Singles	Doubles
← 2006 ·	WTA Auckland Open	· 2008 →

Elena Likhovtseva and Vera Zvonareva were the defending champions, but neither chose to participate this year.

Janette Husárová and Paola Suárez won the title, defeating Hsieh Su-wei and Shikha Uberoi 6–0, 6–2 in the final.

== Seeds ==
1. (Slovakia) Janette Husárová / (Argentina) Paola Suárez (champions)
2. (Argentina) Gisela Dulko / (United States) Meilen Tu (first round; retired due to Dulko's right quad strain)
3. (Greece) Eleni Daniilidou / (Germany) Jasmin Wöhr (semifinals)
4. (Poland) Marta Domachowska / (Croatia) Jelena Kostanić (first round)

== Draw ==
=== Key ===
- Q = Qualifier
- WC = Wild card
- LL = Lucky loser
- Alt = Alternate
- ITF = ITF entry
- PR = Protected ranking
- SR = Special ranking
- SE = Special exempt
- JE = Junior exempt
- JR = Junior Accelerator Programme entrant
- CO = College Accelerator Programme entrant
- NG = Next Gen Accelerator Program entrant
- w/o = Walkover
- r = Retired
- d = Defaulted

=== Draw ===
First round
1	(Slovakia) J Husárová (Argentina) P Suárez	6	6
WC	(New Zealand) M Erakovic (Italy) S Errani	1	2
(France) É Loit (Hungary) Á Szávay	6	6
(China) C Ji (China) T Li	4	4
3	(Greece) E Daniilidou (Germany) J Wöhr	7^{7}	2	6
(Chinese Taipei) C-w Chan (Czech Republic) V Uhlířová	6^{5}	6	3
(Czech Republic) E Birnerová (United States) J Craybas	5	3
(Serbia) J Janković (Slovenia) T Križan	7	6
(China) S Sun (China) T Sun	7	6
(Italy) R Oprandi (Germany) J Schruff	5	0
(New Zealand) L Baker (Australia) N Kriz	3	6	6
4	(Poland) M Domachowska (Croatia) J Kostanić	6	2	3
(United States) L Granville (United States) C Gullickson	6	6
(Russia) E Bychkova (Germany) M Müller	2	3
(Chinese Taipei) S-w Hsieh (India) S Uberoi	1
2	(Argentina) G Dulko (United States) M Tu	2	r

Quarterfinals
1	(Slovakia) J Husárová (Argentina) P Suárez	6	6
(France) É Loit (Hungary) Á Szávay	2	1
3	(Greece) E Daniilidou (Germany) J Wöhr	6	6
(Serbia) J Janković (Slovenia) T Križan	2	3
(China) S Sun (China) T Sun	7	6
(New Zealand) L Baker (Australia) N Kriz	5	2
(United States) L Granville (United States) C Gullickson	5	2
(Chinese Taipei) S-w Hsieh (India) S Uberoi	7	6

Semifinals
1	(Slovakia) J Husárová (Argentina) P Suárez	6	7
3	(Greece) E Daniilidou (Germany) J Wöhr	4	5
(China) S Sun (China) T Sun
(Chinese Taipei) S-w Hsieh (India) S Uberoi	w/o

Final
1	(Slovakia) J Husárová (Argentina) P Suárez	6	6
(Chinese Taipei) S-w Hsieh (India) S Uberoi	0	2
