= 2007 ASB Classic =

- Date: 1–6 January
- Edition: 22nd
- Category: Tier IV Series
- Draw: 32S / 16D
- Prize money: $145,000
- Surface: Hard / outdoor
- Location: Auckland, New Zealand
- Venue: ASB Tennis Centre

Champions

Singles
- (Serbia) Jelena Janković

Doubles
- (Slovakia) Janette Husárová / (Argentina) Paola Suárez
- WTA Auckland Open

The 2007 ASB Classic was a professional women's tennis tournament played on outdoor hard courts. It was the 22nd edition of the ASB Classic, and was part of the Tier IV Series of the 2007 WTA Tour. It took place at the ASB Tennis Centre in Auckland, New Zealand, from 1 January until 6 January 2007. First-seeded Jelena Janković won the singles title and earned $21,140 first-prize money.

== Finals ==
=== Singles ===
(Serbia) Jelena Janković defeated (Russia) Vera Zvonareva, 7–6^{(11–9)}, 5–7, 6–3

- It was Janković's 1st title of the year and 2nd of her career

=== Doubles ===
(Slovakia) Janette Husárová / (Argentina) Paola Suárez defeated (Chinese Taipei) Hsieh Su-wei / (India) Shikha Uberoi, 6–0, 6–2

- It was Husárová's 1st title of the year and 22nd of her career
- It was Suárez's 1st title of the year and 43rd of her career

== See also ==
- 2007 Heineken Open – men's tournament
