= Jelena Janković =

Serbian former tennis player (born 1985)

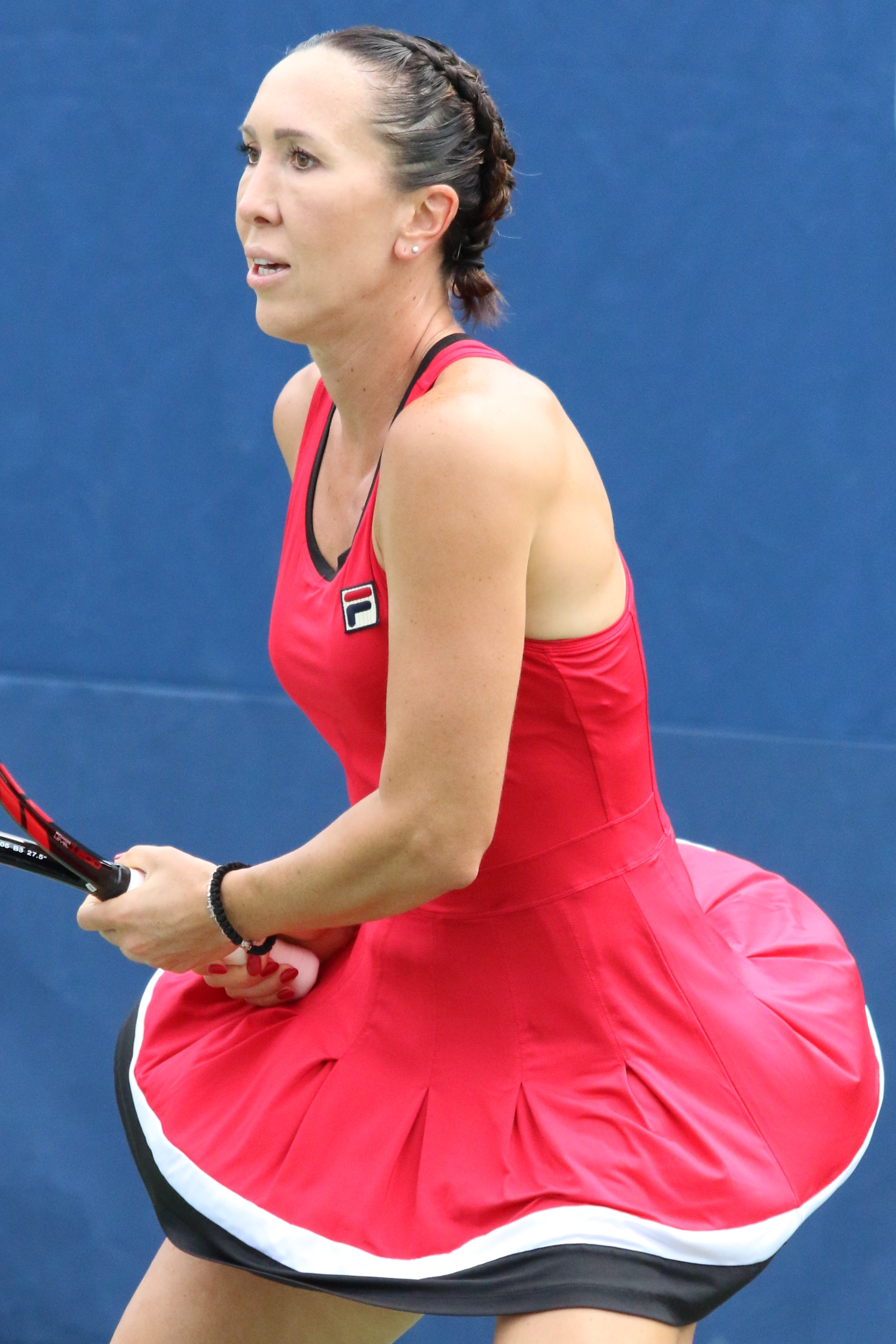
- Native name: Јелена Јанковић; Jelena Janković
- Country (sports): FR Yugoslavia (2000–2003); Serbia and Montenegro (2003–2006); Serbia (2006–2022)
- Residence: Dubai, United Arab Emirates
- Born: 28 February 1985 (age 41) Belgrade, SR Serbia, SFR Yugoslavia
- Height: 1.77 m (5 ft 10 in)
- Turned pro: 2000
- Retired: 2017
- Plays: Right-handed (two-handed backhand)
- Prize money: US$ 19,089,259: 31st in all-time rankings

Singles
- Career record: 644–370
- Career titles: 15
- Highest ranking: No. 1 (11 August 2008)

Grand Slam singles results
- Australian Open: SF (2008)
- French Open: SF (2007, 2008, 2010)
- Wimbledon: 4R (2006, 2007, 2008, 2010, 2015)
- US Open: F (2008)

Other tournaments
- Tour Finals: SF (2008, 2009, 2013)
- Olympic Games: QF (2008)

Doubles
- Career record: 109–134
- Career titles: 2
- Highest ranking: No. 19 (9 June 2014)

Grand Slam doubles results
- Australian Open: 3R (2008, 2013)
- French Open: 3R (2013, 2014)
- Wimbledon: QF (2013)
- US Open: 3R (2006, 2013, 2014, 2015)

Other doubles tournaments
- Olympic Games: 1R (2016)

Mixed doubles
- Career titles: 1

Grand Slam mixed doubles results
- Australian Open: 2R (2007, 2012)
- French Open: 2R (2013, 2016)
- Wimbledon: W (2007)
- US Open: 1R (2005)

Team competitions
- Fed Cup: F (2012), record 34–16
- Hopman Cup: F (2008)

Jelena Janković (Serbian Cyrillic: Јелена Јанковић, Serbian pronunciation: [jělena jǎːŋkoʋitɕ]; born 28 February 1985) is a Serbian former professional tennis player. She was ranked as the world No. 1 in women's singles by the Women's Tennis Association (WTA) for 18 weeks, including as the year-end No. 1 in 2008. Janković won 15 WTA Tour-level singles titles and two doubles titles, including the 2007 Wimbledon mixed-doubles title partnering Jamie Murray. Her career-best major performance in singles was a runner-up finish at the 2008 US Open.

== Family and early life ==
Janković was born in Belgrade, Socialist Federal Republic of Yugoslavia, as the third child of Veselin and Snežana, both economists. She has two brothers, Marko and Stefan. She is a student at the Megatrend University in Belgrade, studying economics. However, she has put her course of study on indefinite hold as she continues to pursue her tennis career. Janković learned her first tennis skills at the Tennis Club 'Red Star'.

As a 9½-year-old she was introduced to tennis by her elder brother and fitness coach Marko. She later trained at the Tennis Academy of Nick Bollettieri. As a junior, she won the 2001 Australian Open and reached junior no. 1 in the world. In 2001, she started to play on the WTA Tour; she reached the second round at her first tournament at the Indian Wells Open.

== Tennis career ==
She was ranked world No. 1 for 17 consecutive weeks until she was overtaken by Serena Williams on 2 February 2009. She was the year-end world No. 1 in 2008, the first player in the history of the WTA Tour to do this without winning a Grand Slam title.

Janković has reached the singles final of the US Open and the singles semifinals of the Australian Open and the French Open. In 2007, she became the first female Serbian player to win a Grand Slam title when she won the Wimbledon mixed doubles title with British partner Jamie Murray.

=== 2004–2006: Rising success ===
In October 2003, Janković entered the top 100 at No. 90 for the first time, after winning her first ITF title in Dubai. Three months later, Janković garnered her first top-10 win against Elena Dementieva in the first round of the 2004 Australian Open. In May, Janković won her first WTA title, a Tier V event, in Budapest, defeating Martina Suchá in the final. Following her win in Budapest, she reached No. 51 in the world. Janković finished 2004 ranked no. 28 in the world.

In March, at Dubai, she advanced to the final following Serena Williams's retirement in the semifinal. Janković then lost in the final to Lindsay Davenport in three sets. She made her first Tier I semifinal in Berlin, losing to Nadia Petrova. In June, she reached her first grass-court final at Birmingham, but lost to Maria Sharapova. In October, Janković reached her third final of the year in Seoul, losing to 16-year-old Nicole Vaidišová in straight sets. Her ranking at the end of the season eclipsed her 2004 record at No. 22.

Janković lost in the second round of the Australian Open to world No. 188 Olga Savchuk. That was the first of ten straight losses, not winning a match from late January into early May. She later said this run caused her to consider quitting tennis. Janković ended her losing streak by beating world No. 17, Elena Likhovtseva in the first round of the Italian Open in Rome. She eventually lost to Venus Williams in three sets in the quarterfinals. At the French Open, Janković reached the third round for the first time, where she lost to world No. 1, Amélie Mauresmo.

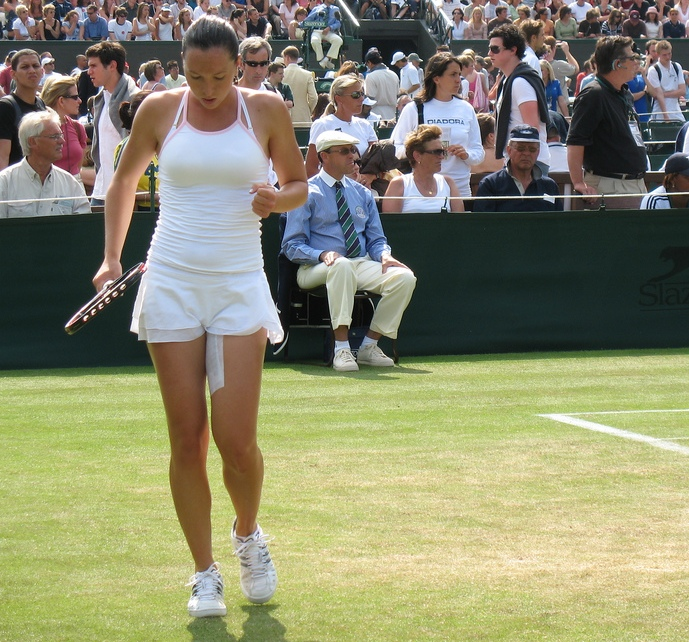
Jelena Janković at 2006 Wimbledon Championships

At Wimbledon, Janković defeated sixth-seeded and defending champion Venus Williams in the third round in three sets. Competing in the fourth round of a Grand Slam event for the first time, she lost to ninth-seeded Anastasia Myskina. In August, Janković reached her fifth career final and first of the year at the LA Championships in Los Angeles, defeating Serena Williams (ranked world No. 108 at the time after a lengthy injury lay-off) in the semifinals, before losing to third-seeded Elena Dementieva in the final. The US Open saw Janković defeat world No. 10, Vaidišová in the third round, world No. 7 and former champion Svetlana Kuznetsova in the fourth round, and world No. 5, Dementieva in her first Grand Slam quarterfinal. In the semifinals, Janković lost to world No. 2, Justine Henin in three sets, after Janković had led 6–4, 4–2. Janković then lost ten consecutive games.

Janković continued her strong form in the aftermath of the US Open. Of the six tournaments she played during the remainder of the year, she reached the quarterfinals at five. This included a run to the semifinals at the China Open in Beijing, defeating world No. 7, Nadia Petrova in the quarterfinals, before losing to world No. 1, Mauresmo, in a third set tiebreak. Janković finished the year at a career-high ranking of world No. 12.

=== 2007: World No. 3 ===
To begin the year, Janković won the second title of her career at the ASB Classic in Auckland, defeating Vera Zvonareva in the final. The following week, at the Sydney International, Janković defeated world No. 7 and former No. 1, Martina Hingis and top-seeded Amélie Mauresmo on the way to the final, where she lost to Kim Clijsters after serving for the match. Janković's strong start to the year meant that some considered her a title threat at the Australian Open; however, she was eliminated in the fourth round by the eventual champion Serena Williams, who was ranked 81st in the world at the time. Because of her results at these tournaments, her ranking rose to world No. 10, the first time she had been included in the top 10.

Janković reached two semifinals in the Middle East in the spring, retiring against Mauresmo due to an ankle injury at the Dubai Championships, and losing in three sets to Justine Henin at the Qatar Ladies Open in Doha. Janković rebounded in the clay-court season, defeating Venus Williams on a third set tiebreak in the semifinals of the Family Circle Cup in Charleston, South Carolina. She went on to defeat Dinara Safina in the final to win the first Tier I title of her career. On European red clay, after losing to world No. 1 Henin in three sets both in the semifinals of the J&S Cup in Warsaw and the quarterfinals of the German Open (failing to hold a 4–0 lead in the third set in the latter), Janković won her second career Tier I title at the Italian Open, defeating second-seeded Svetlana Kuznetsova in the final. This results meant she entered the top 5 in the world rankings for the first time. Janković was the fourth seed at the French Open and one of the favorites for the title. After registering her third consecutive victory over Venus Williams in the third round, she went on to reach the semifinals of a Grand Slam for the second time in her career, but lost there to eventual champion Henin. This improved her ranking to a new career-high of world No. 3.

On grass, Janković captured the Birmingham Classic title, beating top-seeded Maria Sharapova in the final. Sharapova led 3–0 in the third set, before Janković rallied to win the match. The next week, Janković reached the final of the Ordina Open in the Netherlands and became the first player since Chris Evert in 1974 to win 50 matches in the first half of a year. Janković, suffering from a hamstring injury, lost the final to Anna Chakvetadze. At Wimbledon, Janković was the third seed, but lost in the fourth round to the surprise eventual finalist Marion Bartoli. In the mixed doubles competition at Wimbledon, Janković teamed with doubles specialist Jamie Murray to win the title in three sets by beating the fifth-seeded team, Jonas Björkman and Alicia Molik.

During the North American summer hardcourt season, Janković reached the semifinals of the East West Bank Classic in Carson, California but lost there to fellow Serb Ana Ivanovic, having held two match points in the final set. The following week, Janković reached the final of the Tier I Canadian Open in Toronto, where she lost to Henin on Henin's sixth match point. Janković had leads in the first and second sets, but was unable to maintain her lead. At the US Open, Janković lost to Venus Williams in the quarterfinals.

Janković's form tailed off following the US Open. At the Bali Tennis Classic, Janković was upset in the quarterfinals by former world No. 1, Lindsay Davenport, in Davenport's first singles tournament since giving birth. The following week at the China Open in Beijing, Janković defeated Davenport, but lost in the final to Hungarian teenager Ágnes Szávay, after Janković had a match point in the second set. Janković finished the year on a six-match losing streak, losing all three of her round-robin matches on her debut at the year-end WTA Tour Championships in Madrid. She finished the year ranked world No. 3. At the end of the year she had won 72 matches in a solar year, a true record of the WTA.

Janković had successful nose surgery immediately after Madrid to correct a breathing problem. The surgery prevented her from practicing for three weeks.

Olympic Committee of Serbia declared her the sportswoman of the year.

=== 2008: World No. 1 and first major final ===
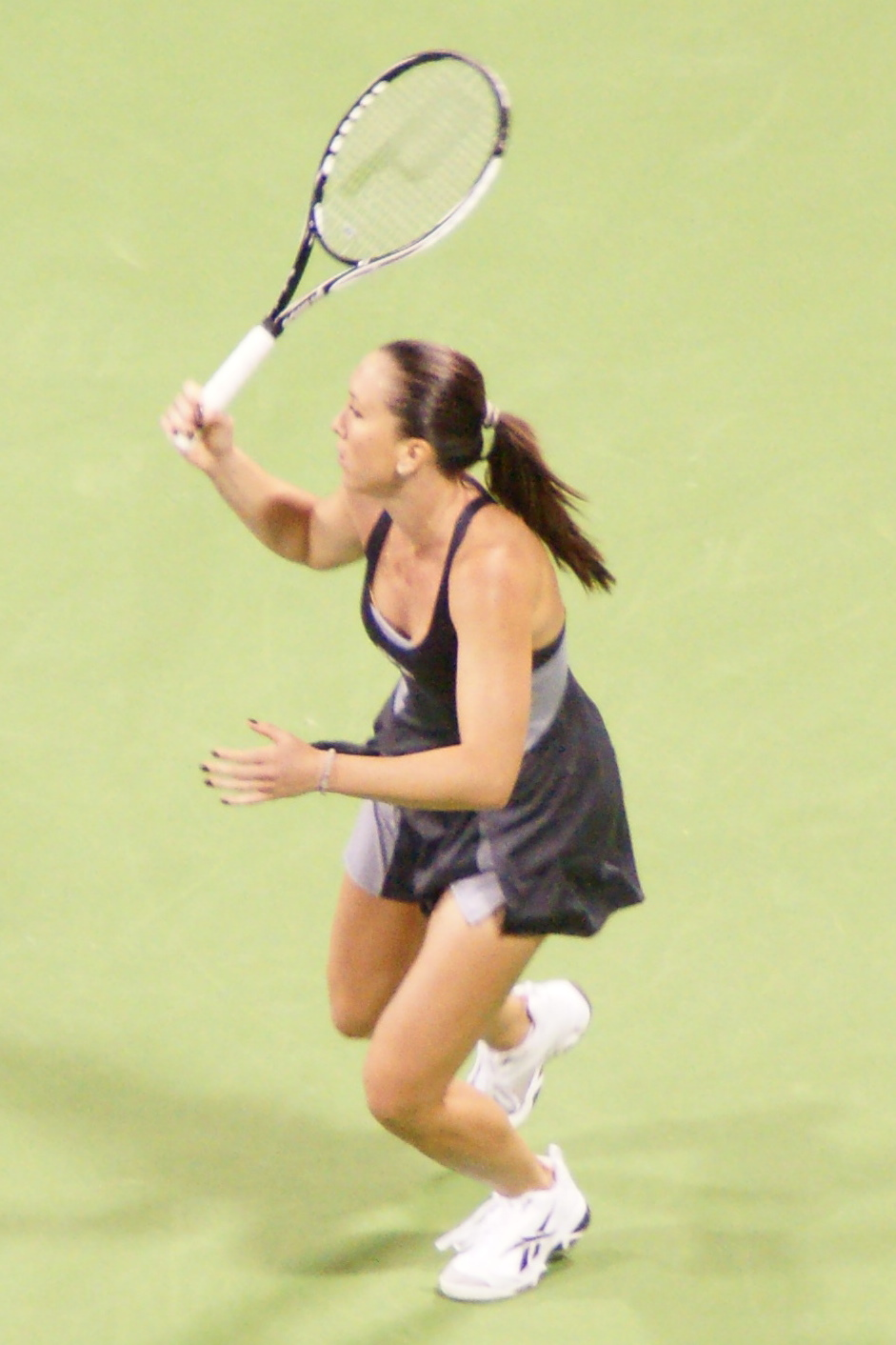
Janković at the 2008 WTA Tour Championships

Janković lost in the semifinals of the Australian Open to eventual champion Maria Sharapova in straight sets, having defeated defending champion Serena Williams en route. In March at the Tier I Indian Wells Open, Janković lost in the semifinals to Ana Ivanovic. The following fortnight, she reached her first final of the year at the Miami Open, losing to Serena Williams in three sets.

Janković started the clay-court season by losing in the quarterfinals of both the Family Circle Cup in Charleston and the German Open in Berlin. Janković then defended her Tier I title in Rome, after defeating Venus Williams in three sets in the quarterfinals, receiving a walkover from the injured Sharapova in the semifinals, and defeating French teenager Alizé Cornet in the final. This was Janković's first singles title of the year. She went into the French Open among the favorites, following the sudden retirement of four-time champion Justine Henin.

However, she lost to compatriot and eventual champion Ivanovic after leading by a break in the third set. Janković was the only player to win a set against Ivanovic during the entire tournament. This marked Janković's fourth defeat in four career Grand Slam semifinals. She would have become the world No. 1 had she reached the final. However, she did reach a new career-high of world No. 2 in the week following the tournament.

At Wimbledon, Janković injured her knee during her third-round match against Caroline Wozniacki. Although she won that match, it visibly hindered her during her fourth-round loss to Tamarine Tanasugarn. Janković would have become the world No. 1 had she reached the semifinals of the tournament. However, she lost to Tamarine Tanasugarn in the fourth round. Janković squandered two further opportunities to immediately take the world No. 1 position with losses in the semifinals of the LA Championships to Dinara Safina and the quarterfinals of the Rogers Cup in Montreal, to Dominika Cibulková. Janković did eventually replace Ivanovic as the world No. 1 on 11 August 2008. She was the 18th woman to have been ranked world No. 1 by the Women's Tennis Association, but the first woman to have done so without ever having reached a Grand Slam final and only the third woman (the others being Amélie Mauresmo and Kim Clijsters) to have become world No. 1 without first winning a Grand Slam title.

Janković's reign as the number one lasted only one week, after she lost in the quarterfinals of the Beijing Olympics to eventual silver-medalist Safina. This meant Ivanovic reclaimed the world No. 1 position. Janković was the second seed at the US Open, where she defeated Olympic gold-medalist Elena Dementieva in the semifinals to reach her first Grand Slam final. There, she lost to fourth-seeded Serena Williams. Janković would have reclaimed the world No. 1 position if she had won the event.

Janković became the world No. 1 again during the fall in the midst of winning three consecutive tournaments. At the China Open, Janković defeated Svetlana Kuznetsova in two sets to win the title. The following week, Janković played in the Porsche Tennis Grand Prix in Stuttgart, where she defeated Venus Williams in the semifinals and Nadia Petrova in the final. In the Kremlin Cup in Moscow, Janković defeated defending champion Dementieva in the semifinals before triumphing against Vera Zvonareva in the final for her third title in three weeks, the first time for a player on the WTA Tour to do so since 2005.

As the top seed at the year-end 2008 WTA Tour Championships held in Doha, Janković won two of her three round-robin matches, including only the second win of her career over Ivanovic. However, she lost in the semifinals, to eventual champion Venus Williams and ended the year as world No. 1. In all, Janković lost to eventual champions at six tournaments (including three Grand Slam tournaments) during the season. Janković was later named the ITF World Champion for her performance in 2008. She won four titles during the season, the most of anyone on the tour along with Serena Williams and Safina. The Olympic Committee of Serbia declared her the best sportswoman for the second year in a row.

=== 2009–2010: Continued success as top-ten player ===
Janković was seeded first at the Australian Open in Melbourne. She lost to 16th-seeded Marion Bartoli in the fourth round. Bartoli hit 34 winners, compared to Janković's 17 and won 81 % of her first serve points, compared to Janković's 56 %. Janković lost her number-one ranking to Serena Williams as a result. Her next WTA Tour event was the Open GDF Suez tournament in Paris. Janković beat Francesca Schiavone, Li Na and fifth-seeded Alizé Cornet but then lost to Amélie Mauresmo in the semifinals.

Janković was upset by Kaia Kanepi in the third round of Doha in straight sets, in what she called "the worst match of my career." She was the second-seeded player in Indian Wells, losing in the second round to Anastasia Pavlyuchenkova. After the match, she conceded that she has been struggling with her confidence, saying "I need a lot of work." Janković then lost in the second round of the Sony Ericsson Open in Key Biscayne to Gisela Dulko after Janković failed to hold leads of 5–2 in the second set and 5–2 in the tiebreaker.

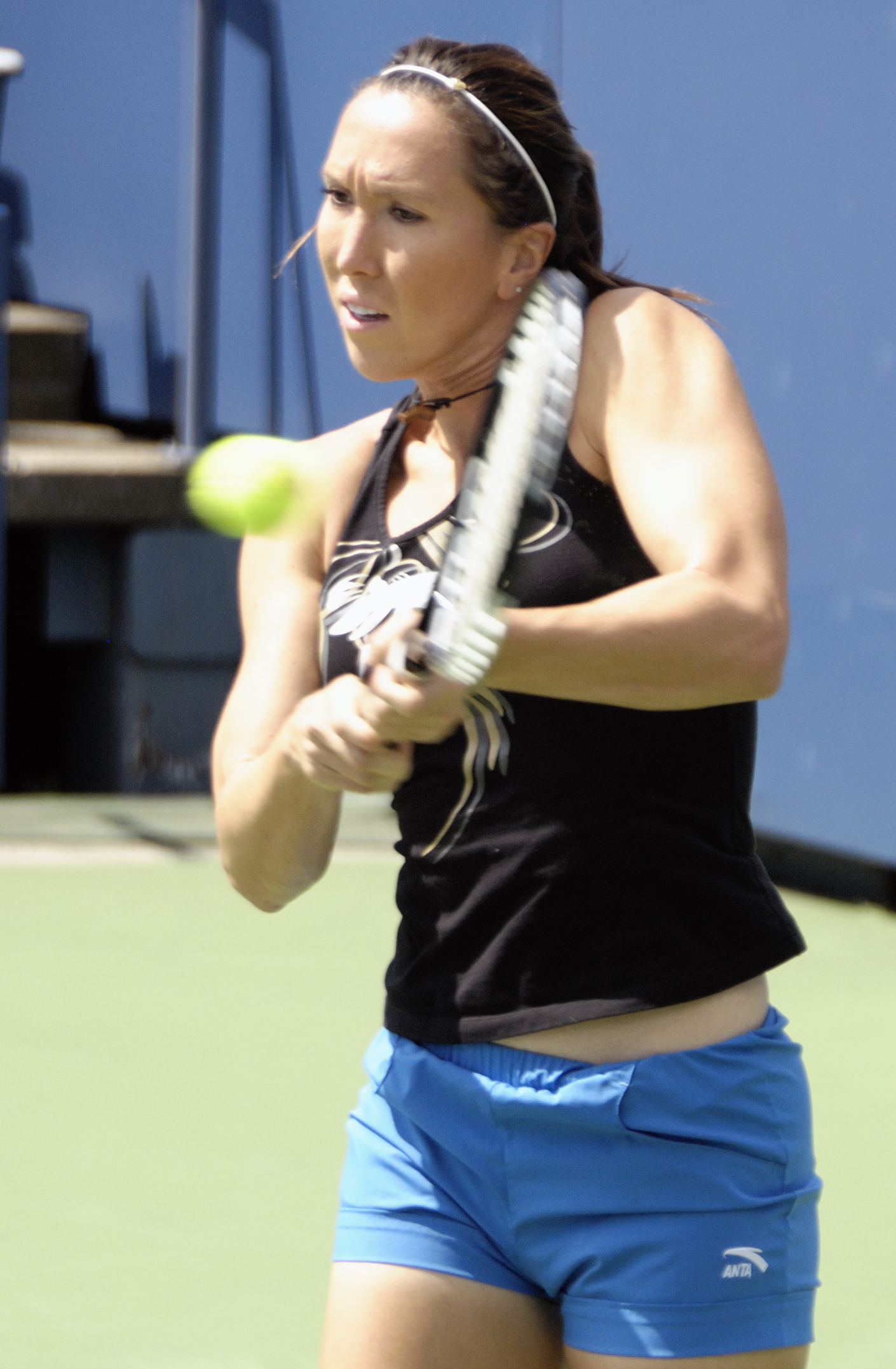
Janković at the 2009 US Open

Beginning her spring clay-court season at the Andalucia Tennis Experience in Marbella, Janković defeated fifth-seeded Spaniard Carla Suárez Navarro in three sets for her first title of 2009. Janković beat Anabel Medina Garrigues in the Fed Cup play-offs against Spain to bring the Serbian team into the World Group for the first time. The previous day, Janković and Ana Ivanovic had won their single matches.

Janković was the defending champion at the Porsche Tennis Grand Prix in Stuttgart and Italian Open in Rome, but lost in the quarterfinals. Seeded fourth at the inaugural Madrid Open, she advanced to the quarterfinals once again, but was defeated by Patty Schnyder.

Seeded fifth at the French Open, she lost to Sorana Cîrstea of Romania in the fourth round despite serving for the match in the third set at 5–4.

Janković was seeded sixth at Wimbledon where she lost to qualifier Melanie Oudin in the third round.

At the Western & Southern Open in Cincinnati, Janković defeated Victoria Azarenka and Elena Dementieva (saving four match points). In the final, Janković won her second title of the year, defeating world No. 1, Dinara Safina. With the win, her ranking also went back to world No. 4. Despite her good form leading up to the US Open, Janković's inconsistency continued, as she suffered a shock second-round defeat by Yaroslava Shvedova despite having match points in the third-set tie-break. Her ranking went down to world No. 8.

At the Pan Pacific Open seeded seventh, Janković defeated Marion Bartoli in the quarterfinals and Li Na in the semifinals. She faced Maria Sharapova in the final and retired while behind 5–2 because of an arm injury. Janković received a first-round bye in Beijing. She lost her opening match to home favorite Peng Shuai.

At the WTA Tour Championships, Janković lost her first match to Azarenka but bounced back defeating Safina and Wozniacki to clinch the first berth in her group. In her second year-end championship semifinal she lost to Venus Williams in three sets. She ended the year ranked No. 8 and with a 46–19 record.

At the Australian Open, Janković, seeded eighth, lost to 31st seed Alona Bondarenko in the third round. Next, Janković represented Serbia in the 2010 Fed Cup. In her first match, she rallied from 4–6, 1–4 down to defeat Alisa Kleybanova, then defeated reigning French Open champion Svetlana Kuznetsova. In the deciding doubles match, she partnered with Ana Ivanovic but fell to Kuznetsova and Kleybanova. Her next scheduled tournament was the Dubai Championships where she lost to Vera Zvonareva in the third round. She traveled to Indian Wells for the Indian Wells Open. At the tournament, she was seeded sixth and defeated Caroline Wozniacki to take her 12th title. Janković's next tournament was the Miami Open, where she was seeded seventh. In the fourth round, she lost to Samantha Stosur, ending her eight-match winning streak.

In the Fed Cup qualifying, Janković defeated Slovakia's Magdaléna Rybáriková in her first singles match, but fell to Hantuchová in her second. Janković and Bojana Jovanovski then fell to Rybáriková and Hantuchová in the deciding doubles match. Janković was the fourth seed at the Porsche Grand Prix where she lost against Justine Henin in the quarterfinals for the tenth time in a row. As the seventh seed at the Italian Open, she handed Venus Williams in the quarterfinals the heaviest loss in her career, surrendering only one game. She then beat reigning world No. 1, Serena Williams, in the semifinals, after saving a match point. She became one of the few women to defeat both Williams sisters in the same tournament and the first player who beat both sisters in less than 24 hours in one tournament. However, she lost to unseeded María José Martínez Sánchez in the final. Nevertheless, her ranking increased to world No. 4. Janković lost in the quarterfinals of the Madrid Open to eventual champion Aravane Rezaï. At her next tournament, the French Open, she was seeded fourth and lost in the semifinals to Samantha Stosur. Two weeks later, her ranking increased to world No. 3.

Janković, struggling with injuries, played in the Wimbledon Championships and eventually retired against eventual finalist Vera Zvonareva in the fourth round. Regardless, the new world No. 2 lost in the early rounds at both the Western & Southern Open and Rogers Cup as the top seed in each (and defending champion in Cincinnati). Janković then traveled to New York to play in the US Open, where she was seeded fourth and was defeated by Kaia Kanepi in the third round. In the China Open, she fell in the third round against fellow Serbian player Bojana Jovanovski. Janković's final event of the year was the Tour Championships, where she qualified for the fourth consecutive year, as the sixth seed. After losing her opening match to Zvonareva, Janković reportedly collapsed in the locker room, yet still came out to play Clijsters the next day and lost. She lost her third and final group match to Azerenka, bringing an end to her 2010 season.

On 30 November Janković played a humanitarian match in Pionir Hall. Revenue from tickets was intended to help elementary school in Kraljevo damaged by an earthquake.

=== 2011–2012: Struggles with form ===
At the start of the year, Janković announced her decision to work with Andrei Pavel on a trial basis.

She began 2011 by falling in the first round to Aravane Rezaï in three sets at the Sydney International. Her poor form continued at the Australian Open, losing in the second round against Peng Shuai. Janković reached the semifinals of the Dubai Tennis Championships, beating fourth seed Samantha Stosur but losing to Caroline Wozniacki in the semifinal, Wozniacki's first win in five attempts against Janković. Up next for Janković was the Qatar Ladies Open. She reached the semifinals again, losing to Vera Zvonareva in three sets. The Russian had then beaten the Serb in their last five meetings. She then reached the final of the Monterrey Open, where she was defeated by Anastasia Pavlyuchenkova despite being up a set. Indian Wells Open was next for Janković, where she was the defending champion. She was defeated by Ana Ivanovic in the fourth round. Janković's next tournament was the Sony Ericsson Open where she lost to Andrea Petkovic in the quarterfinals.

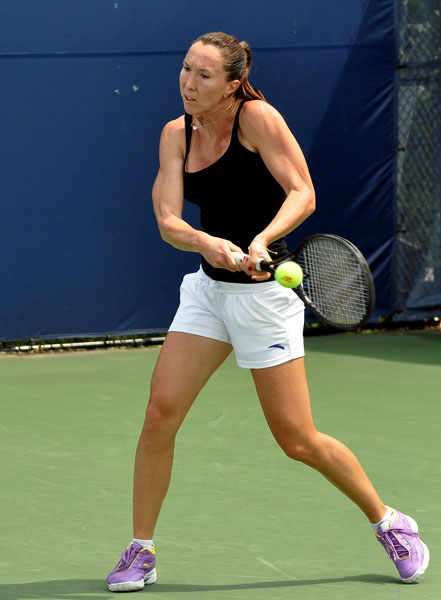
Jelena Janković at the 2011 Rogers Cup.

Janković's next tournament was Family Circle Cup in Charleston where she lost in the semifinals to world No. 1, Caroline Wozniacki. She then played in the Fed Cup against Slovakia, beating Daniela Hantuchová and winning an epic doubles match with Aleksandra Krunić against Hantuchová and Magdaléna Rybáriková, saving three match points. With this, Serbia was placed in World Group I again. At Italian Open, Janković lost to world No. 1, Caroline Wozniacki in the quarterfinals for the third time in a row. Her ranking dropped to No. 10, the lowest it had been since the beginning of 2007. Janković was the tenth seed at the French Open. In the fourth round, Janković fell to fifth seed and defending champion Francesca Schiavone. As a result, she dropped out of top 10 for the first time since early 2007.

Janković was the 15th seed at the Wimbledon Championships, but lost to María José Martínez Sánchez in the first round, her first opening-round exit in a Grand Slam since the 2005 French Open.

Janković was seeded 13th at the Cincinnati Open, where she lost in the final to Maria Sharapova in three sets. She reached the third round at the US Open, losing to Anastasia Pavlyuchenkova. She reached the semifinals of the Generali Ladies Linz tournament, falling to Petra Kvitová.

Janković began 2012 at the Brisbane International, losing to Francesca Schiavone in the quarterfinals. She then lost in the second round of the Sydney International to third seed Victoria Azarenka. At the Australian Open, Janković was defeated by Caroline Wozniacki in the fourth round.

She played the Dubai Open and advanced to the semifinals without dropping a set, where she was beaten by the in form Agnieszka Radwańska. She reached the semis in Kuala Lumpur, Malaysia, before losing to fifth seed Petra Martić in three sets. Janković lost her next three matches in Indian Wells, Miami, and in Charleston to Venus Williams.

Janković reached the E-boks Sony Ericsson Open in Copenhagen semifinals before losing to second seed Angelique Kerber. In the Fed Cup semifinals against Russia in Moscow, Janković defeated Anastasia Pavlyuchenkova and Svetlana Kuznetsova. She then lost four of her next five matches, being defeated in the opening rounds of the Madrid Open, the Italian Open and in Brussels before a second-round loss at the French Open to young American Varvara Lepchenko.

Janković turned her fortunes around by reaching the finals of Aegon Classic 2012, losing to Melanie Oudin. However, she lost in the opening round of Wimbledon to unseeded former world No. 1, Kim Clijsters. It was the second year in a row that Janković lost in the opening round of Wimbledon. Janković lost in the opening round of the Olympic tennis tournament to eventual gold medallist Serena Williams.

Janković reached the final of Dallas and the third round of the US Open, but was defeated by second seed Agnieszka Radwańska.

=== 2013: First title in three years, back into the top 10 ===
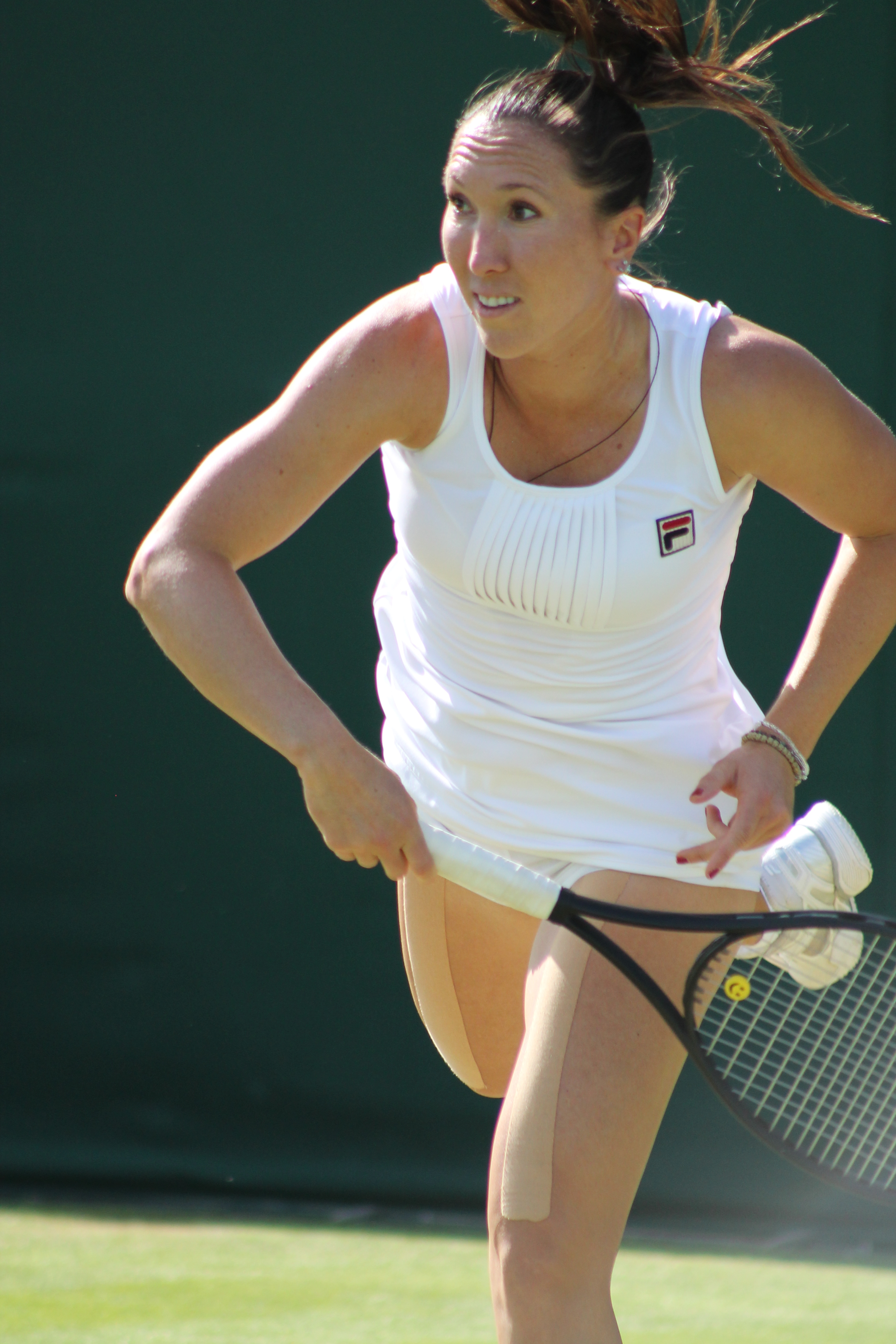
Jelena Janković at the 2013 Wimbledon Championships.

At the Australian Open, Janković lost in the third round to compatriot and former world No. 1 Ana Ivanovic. In February, Janković won her first title in three years at Bogotá, defeating Paula Ormaechea in straight sets. Janković made an early exit from Indian Wells the following week, losing to Svetlana Kuznetsova in the second round. However, she managed to reach the semifinals at Miami, losing to Maria Sharapova in straight sets. The run in Miami returned Janković to the world's top 20 for the first time in almost one year.

Janković then reached the final of the Family Circle Cup, losing there to defending champion and world No. 1 Serena Williams. At Stuttgart, Janković upset Samantha Stosur in the first round, before losing to Sabine Lisicki in the second. Janković lost in the first round of Madrid Open to Chanelle Scheepers. She made it to the quarterfinal at Internazionali BNL d'Italia where she was defeated by Simona Halep after she missed two matchpoints. At the French Open Janković made it to the quarterfinals but lost to Sharapova in three sets. She also played at Nürnberger Versicherungscup where she was defeated by Andrea Petkovic in the semifinals.

At Wimbledon Championships, she lost in the second round of singles to Vesna Dolonc but made it to the quarterfinal of doubles (in pair with Mirjana Lučić-Baroni) where they lost to eventual champions Hsieh Su-wei and Peng Shuai. Janković kicked off her US hard-court season in Carlsbad, where she was upset in the second round by Urszula Radwańska in three sets. She also competed in the doubles tournament with Katarina Srebotnik and lost in the semifinals. This propelled her to a career high in doubles, No. 38, seven years after her last career high. She then competed at Toronto, and lost to eventual finalist Sorana Cîrstea in the third round. Janković again partnered Srebotnik in the doubles. The unseeded pair won the tournament. This marks Janković's second career doubles title, her 1st title in Birmingham in 2006. This result will further increase her doubles ranking to a career high, No. 25. At the Western & Southern Open, Janković defeated four top-25 players en route to the semifinals: Sabine Lisicki, Ekaterina Makarova, Sloane Stephens, and Roberta Vinci. She then lost to world No. 2, Victoria Azarenka in three tough sets. This result means that Janković clinches the 9th seed at the US Open, after the retirement of Marion Bartoli and withdrawal of Maria Sharapova. And as a top 10 seed at a Grand Slam for the first time since 2011 French Open, Janković made it to the round of 16 for the first time at the US Open since her run to the final in 2008, after beating Madison Keys, Alisa Kleybanova, and Kurumi Nara, all in straight sets. She was defeated in the fourth round by a peak form Li Na. As a result, Janković was back into the top 10 singles rankings for the first time since June 2011.

During the Asian hard court season Janković performed well. She reached the 1/16 round at the Pan Pacific Open in Tokyo, where she was defeated by later declared Newcomer of the year Eugenie Bouchard. At the China Open in Beijing, she reached the final for the first time since 2008, defeating Tokyo champion Petra Kvitová en route. Furthermore, for the first time since 2009, Janković won more than 40 matches in a year. After this result she will be world No. 8. This strong Asian run also meant that Janković is the seventh qualifier for the year-end championships at Istanbul. She made the semifinals at the WTA Championships, defeating world No. 2, Victoria Azarenka, in straight sets along the way, finishing 2013 with a three-set loss to eventual champion and year-end number one, Serena Williams. Janković finished the season in the top 10 for the first time since 2010 at No. 8.

=== 2014: Good results and final back injury ===
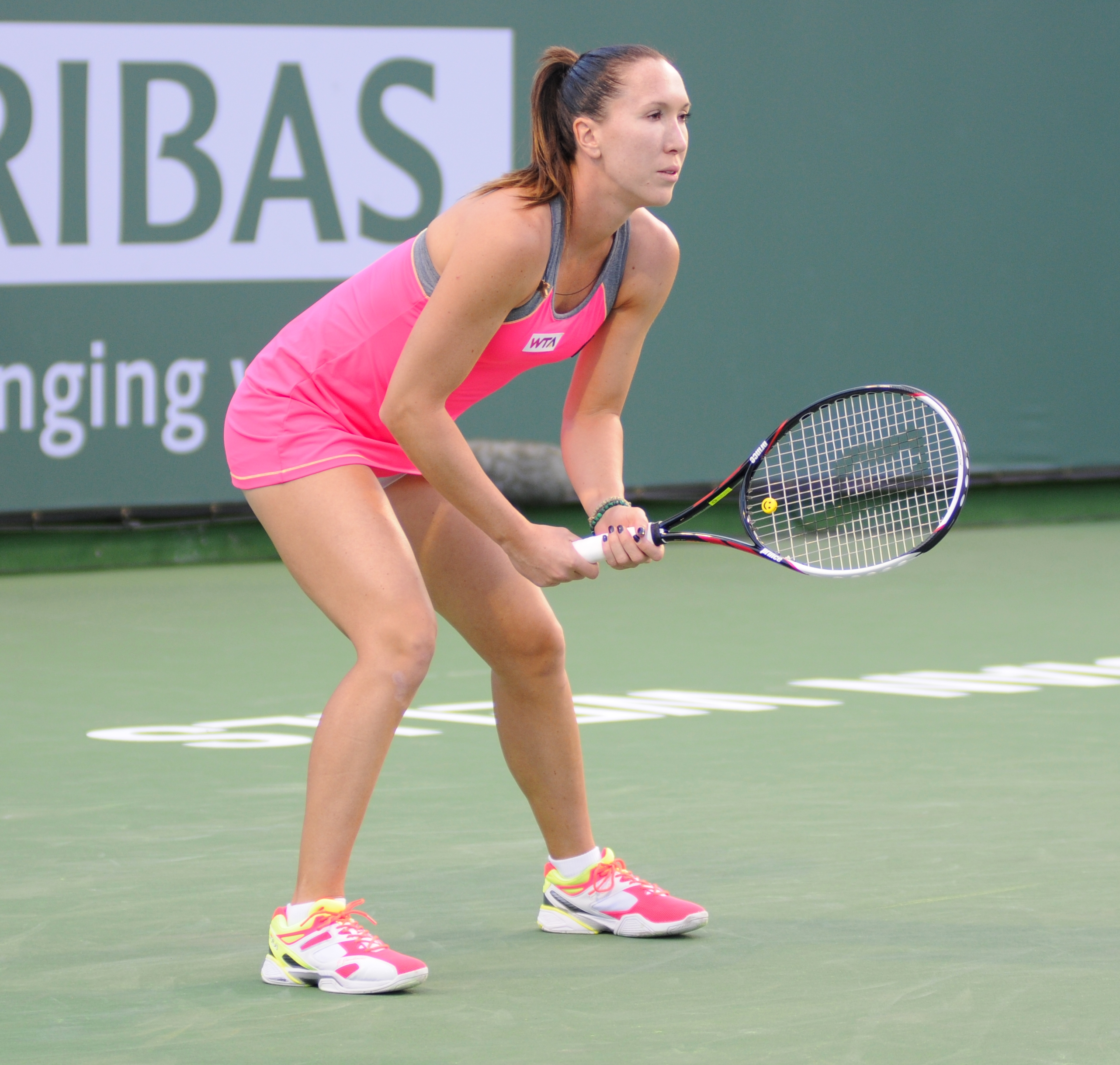
Janković at the 2014 Indian Wells Open.

Janković kicked off 2014 at the premier-level event Brisbane International as the number four seed. She beat former Roland Garros champion Francesca Schiavone, Elina Svitolina, and world No. 9, Angelique Kerber, to reach the semifinals where she lost to world No. 2, Victoria Azarenka, in three sets. This was the first time she made it to the semifinals of an Australian Open warm up tournament since 2007. Seeded fourth at the Sydney International, Janković was upset in the first round by Ekaterina Makarova in straight sets. Her next stop was the Australian Open. She defeated three Japanese players consecutively, Misaki Doi, Ayumi Morita, and Kurumi Nara, to reach the fourth round that set up a rematch against up and Simona Halep, where Janković lost in three sets. Her next set of tournaments were during the Middle-Eastern hard court swing at Doha and Dubai. She made it to the semifinals in Doha, beating Karin Knapp, Alisa Kleybanova, and Petra Kvitová, dropping less than four games in each match. She lost to Angelique Kerber in a second set tiebreak. In Dubai, Janković defeated Maryna Zanevska and Lucie Šafářová, both in straight sets, before falling to Serena Williams in the quarterfinals.

Janković played the two Premier Mandatory events during the North American hardcourt swing at Indian Wells and Miami. At Indian Wells, she defeated Yvonne Meusburger, Magdaléna Rybáriková, and Caroline Wozniacki in straight sets to reach the quarterfinals against Agnieszka Radwańska. In the third and deciding set, Janković came back from a 0–4 deficit, leveling the match at 4–4. Despite having game points in the following two games, she lost the match, 5–7, 6–2, 4–6. She suffered a shocking opening round exit in Miami against Varvara Lepchenko, serving for the match at 5–1 in the third set. She lost the match 3–6, 6–2, 6–7.

Her clay court season started in Charleston, where she was the second seed and defending finalist. She made it to the quarterfinals, defeating Lauren Davis and Ajla Tomljanović. She lost to Eugenie Bouchard in three sets, continuing her three-set misery for 2014. On the red clay at Bogotá, Janković made it to the finals, where she failed to defend her title against Caroline Garcia. She lost in straight sets. At the Porsche Tennis Grand Prix, she reached the semifinals after recording wins over Mona Barthel, Flavia Pennetta and Alisa Kleybanova. She then lost to compatriot Ana Ivanovic. Janković lost in the second round at Madrid to Anastasia Pavlyuchenkova. She did well at the Italian Open in Rome where she reached the semifinals, losing to Errani. She defeated Pennetta and third seed Agnieszka Radwańska en route. At Roland Garros, Janković was seeded sixth and she reached the fourth round where she lost to Errani again.

Janković had a dismal grass court season. She lost her opening matches at Eastbourne and Wimbledon to Madison Keys and Kaia Kanepi respectively. In August, she participated in Montreal as the seventh seed. She had a first-round bye and faced Sloane Stephens in her opener. She won in three tight sets. In the third round, she lost to rising American CoCo Vandeweghe in another tight three-set match. At the 2014 Western & Southern Open, she was the eighth seed and received a first round bye. She defeated Annika Beck in the second round and then defeated Sloane Stephens for a spot in the quarterfinals. In the last eight, she lost to Serena again. Janković reached the fourth round at the US Open where she lost to Belinda Bencic in straight sets. Janković fell out of the top 10 after the US Open concluded.

Janković then travelled to Tokyo for the Pan Pacific Open. She was the fourth seed and received a first round bye. She lost to Garbiñe Muguruza in her opening match. At the inaugural Wuhan Open, Janković the tenth seed defeated Christina McHale in the first round. In her following match, she faced Vandeweghe but retired in the first set while trailing 1–4 with a back problem. In Beijing, Janković was the defending finalist but fell in three sets to Alizé Cornet in the opening round. Her last tournament of the season was the inaugural Tianjin Open where she was the top seed. She overcame Alla Kudryavtseva in the first round. She then lost to Zheng Saisai.

=== 2015: 600th win and new titles ===
Janković began 2015 at the Brisbane International. Seeded sixth, she lost in the first round to Ajla Tomljanovic. She then admitted that she had recently thought to end her career because of a back injury. Also, she added that she lost a lot of muscle mass, had not done any activity in past two months and that she needs time to get back in normal form. Bad results continued in January, including a first-round loss at the Australian Open to Timea Bacsinszky. She had never lost her opener in Melbourne prior to this.

She won her first match of 2015 in Dubai, defeating Tímea Babos in three sets. In the second round she lost to Garbiñe Muguruza and dropped out of the top 20 as a result. The following week in Doha, Janković reached the second round after beating Zheng Saisai. She faced top seed Petra Kvitová for a place in the quarterfinals but retired midway due to right hip injury.

Despite coming to North America with 2–4 season record, Janković made the final at the Indian Wells Open, beating reigning Australian Open semifinalist Madison Keys, Belinda Bencic and Sabine Lisicki en route. In the final where she faced Simona Halep, she managed to take the first set and serve for the match, but came up short. As a result, Janković returned to the top 20. In Miami, Janković fell in her opening match for the second straight year when she was defeated by Victoria Azarenka.

In April at the Family Circle Cup, Janković made the third round, conceding a walkover to Danka Kovinić due to an injury. The following month at the Italian Open, Janković overcame Camila Giorgi and Magdaléna Rybáriková to set up a third round clash with Kvitová for a place in the last eight but was defeated by the fourth seeded Czech in straight sets. Janković then played in Strasbourg where she reached the quarterfinals but was forced to retire against Sloane Stephens. Janković then suffered her second consecutive opening round at a Grand Slam when she fell to qualifier Sesil Karatantcheva in straight sets at the French Open.

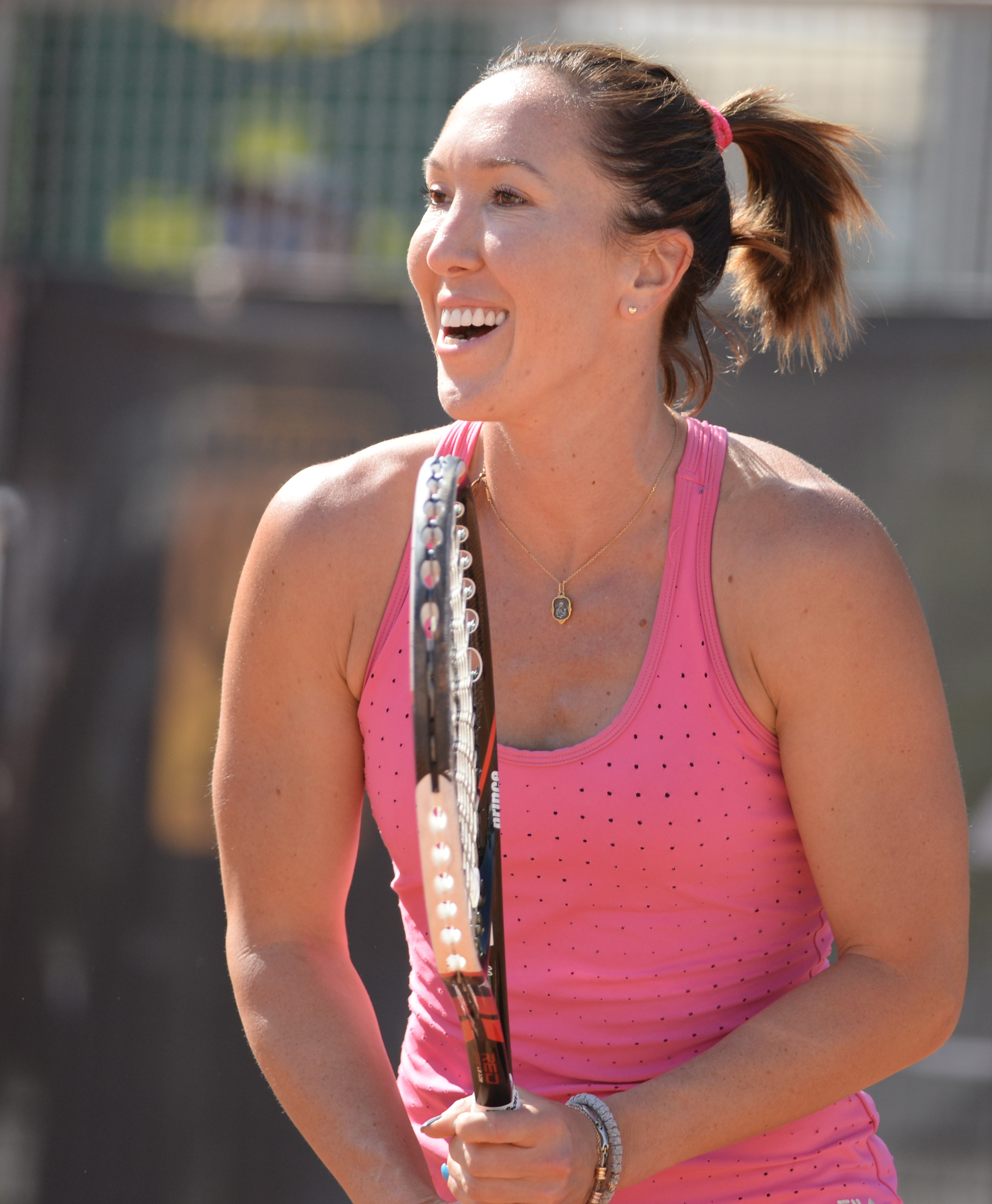
Janković at the 2015 French Open qualifiers

Janković's grass court season began in 's-Hertogenbosch where she was the second seed. She routinely advanced to the semifinals where she faced Bencic but lost in straight sets. At the Birmingham Classic, Janković defeated Tereza Smitková and Casey Dellacqua to advance to the third round. She lost to eventual champion Angelique Kerber. Janković won first two matches in three-setters at the Wimbledon Championships and then made the biggest upset during the tournament by taking out the defending champion and world No. 2 Kvitová in the third round, having lost their two previous matches this year. She fought back from a set and a break down to prevail. Her win granted her a place in the fourth round, where she lost to Agnieszka Radwańska. It was the first time since 2010 that Janković made the second week and won consecutive matches at Wimbledon; her performance also made 2015 the first year since 2007 that Janković won more than five grass court matches.

After losing in the first round of the Istanbul Open to Urszula Radwańska, Janković won the WTA 125 title in Nanchang by defeating Chang Kai-chen. She did not drop a set throughout the tournament. This tournament revitalized her career and opened her path to a successful Chinese hard court season, right after the second round of the Rogers Cup and an excellent semifinal in Cincinnati after beating Madison Keys and eighth-seeded Karolína Plíšková en route. Janković then suffered a shocking loss to wildcard Océane Dodin in the first round of the US Open.

Janković completed a great Asian swing and confirmed her excellent results in China by winning her 14th career title in Guangzhou, her first since 2013. She saved match point in the semifinals against Yanina Wickmayer, before losing just two games in the final against Denisa Allertová. At the Wuhan Open, Janković defeated Heather Watson in the first round in three sets. She faced sixth seed Angelique Kerber in the second round but lost in three sets. Janković won her third title of the season (and milestone 15th career title) at Hong Kong by battling past Venus Williams in the semifinals in a tight two sets win. Janković then hung tough against world No. 9 and top-seeded Angelique Kerber (Janković's third top-ten win of the year), coming back from a set down to capture the title with a three-set victory.

=== 2016: Injuries and loss of form ===
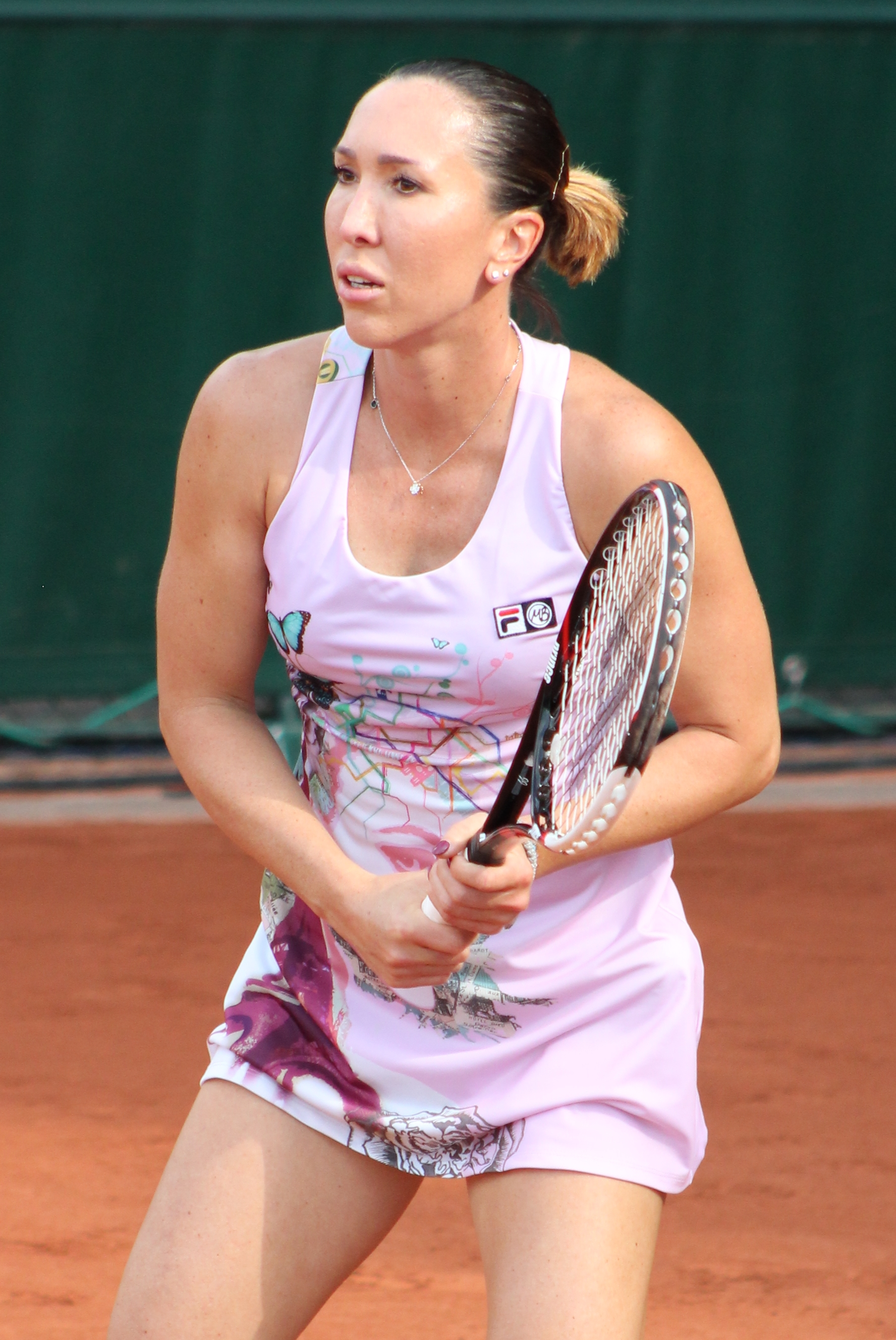
Janković at the 2016 French Open

Janković started her 2016 season in Brisbane, but lost in the first round against recent US Open finalist and eighth seed Roberta Vinci in three sets despite being up a set. She then traveled to Sydney and won her first-round match against CoCo Vandeweghe in straight sets. However, she fell to Sara Errani in two tie-break sets in the second round despite being up 5–1 in the second set. Seeded 19th at the Australian Open, Janković won her first-round match against Polona Hercog. She suffered a second-round upset at the hands of Laura Siegemund.

During the Fed Cup tie versus Spain, Janković lost both of her matches to Carla Suárez Navarro and Garbiñe Muguruza. Serbia ended up losing 0–4. At the Dubai Tennis Championships, Janković upset fifth seed Belinda Bencic in the first round to get her first top-10 win of the season. However, she lost in the second round to Andrea Petkovic. Seeded 14th at the Qatar Ladies Open, Janković was tested by qualifier Jana Čepelová in the first round but managed to win in three sets. She exited the tournament after losing to Monica Niculescu in the second round. Janković then went to Indian Wells having to defend finalist points from the previous year. Seeded 19th, she received a bye into the second round and beat Carina Witthöft in straight sets. Janković then dominated CoCo Vandeweghe in her third-round match; she only conceded one game. She then lost to third seed Agnieszka Radwańska in the fourth round. Seeded 18th at the Miami Open, Janković withdrew from her second-round match against qualifier Magda Linette due to a right shoulder injury.

Her clay-court season didn't open so well as she was forced to withdraw from the Charleston Open because of the right shoulder injury she sustained in Miami. Janković returned to action at the Madrid Open. She lost in the first round to Sorana Cîrstea. At the Italian Open, Janković was defeated in the first round by Eugenie Bouchard. Seeded 23rd at the French Open, Janković lost in the first round to Tatjana Maria.

Janković opened her grass-court season at the Rosmalen Open. Seeded second, she was defeated in the second round by Evgeniya Rodina. Seeded second at the first edition of the Mallorca Open, Janković reached the semifinal round where she lost to Anastasija Sevastova. Seeded 22nd at the Wimbledon Championships, Janković lost in a second round thriller to qualifier Marina Erakovic.

Seeded second at the first edition of the Ladies Championship Gstaad, Janković suffered a first-round upset at the hands of world no. 797 Rebeka Masarova. As the top seed at the Brasil Tennis Cup, Janković fell in the second round to Ana Bogdan.

Ranked forty at the US Open, Janković lost in the second round to eleventh seed Carla Suárez Navarro.

Seeded second and last year champion at the Guangzhou International Open, Janković again reached the final but lost to Lesia Tsurenko. At the Wuhan Open, Janković upset second seed Garbiñe Muguruza in her second-round match. She was then defeated in the third round by Barbora Strýcová. In Beijing at the China Open, Janković lost in the first round to Kristina Mladenovic. Seeded seventh and the defending champion at the Hong Kong Open, Janković was defeated in her semifinal match by fifth seed Caroline Wozniacki. Janković played her final tournament of the season at the Kremlin Cup. She lost in the second round to seventh seed Anastasia Pavlyuchenkova.

Janković ended the year ranked 54.

=== 2017: Recovery, continued struggles with form and worst ranking since 2003 ===
Janković started her season at the Shenzhen Open where she lost in the first round to second seed Simona Halep. Next, she progressed to Hobart where she suffered a tough first-round defeat to third seed and eventual finalist Monica Niculescu. Conveniently, Janković gave, arguably, her best performance of the year at the Australian Open. She beat 26th seed Laura Siegemund and Julia Görges in her first two rounds. In the third round, she faced eighth seed and longtime rival Svetlana Kuznetsova. Kuznetsova ended up outlasting Janković in the third set 9–7 in what is currently the third-longest main draw match in Australian Open history.

As the eighth seed at the Taiwan Open, Janković was stunned by Kurumi Nara in the first round, despite having taken the first set. Janković found herself needing to qualify for the main draw at the Qatar Ladies Open, and she did so successfully. However, she was defeated in the first round by Anastasia Pavlyuchenkova. The following week, Janković played at the Dubai Championships where she lost in the first round to German wildcard Mona Barthel. In March, Janković competed at Indian Wells where she defeated American wildcard Irina Falconi in the first round. In the second, she was up against 12th seed and rival Venus Williams. Janković raced to a one-set lead and appeared on course to the third round when Williams began finding her range. Janković squandered match points before losing a second set tiebreak and, eventually, the match. As a result, Janković's singles ranking dropped to 54. This loss would tie up the rivalry between Janković and the seven-time Grand Slam champion at seven wins apiece. Janković started the second leg of the Sunshine Swing in Miami with a first-round loss in a third set tiebreak to Yaroslava Shvedova.

Janković began her clay-court season at the Charleston Open where she defeated Ekaterina Alexandrova in the first round. She was defeated in the second by sixth seed Sam Stosur. At the Prague Open, Janković lost in the first round to eventual finalist Kristýna Plíšková. At the Madrid Open, Janković was defeated in the first round by fourth seed and last year finalist Dominika Cibulková. Playing her final tournament before the French Open at the Italian Open, Janković lost in the second round to Julia Görges. Ranked 63 at the French Open, Janković was defeated in the first round by qualifier Richèl Hogenkamp.

Janković had a very poor grass-court season. She suffered a first-round loss at the Rosmalen Open to qualifier Petra Krejsová. At the Mallorca Open, she was defeated in the first round by third seed and defending champion Caroline Garcia. Ranked 67 at the Wimbledon Championships, Janković lost in round one to ninth seed Agnieszka Radwańska.

Seeded sixth at the Jiangxi International Open, she was defeated in the second round by Chinese qualifier Lu Jingjing.

In Washington, Janković retired in the third set of her first-round encounter with fifth seed Océane Dodin due to back pain. At the US Open, she lost in the first round to 13th seed Petra Kvitová.

Janković underwent back surgery in October; she has not played another tournament since then. She ended the year ranked 153, her worst ranking since January 2003.

=== 2018–2019: Uncertainty looms ===
Due to her back surgery in October 2017, Janković missed the entire 2018 and 2019 seasons. She also underwent eye surgery in May 2018, further delaying any comeback plans. For the first time since 2001, she was unranked in the WTA singles rankings.

=== 2022: Retirement ===
Janković did not participate in any WTA Tour tournaments prior to the suspension of the tour due to the COVID-19 pandemic. She announced on Instagram that she would participate in an exhibition tournament in Belgrade, partnering with Novak Djokovic in a mixed doubles match. This was her first tennis match since September 2017. After the match, she admitted that she still was uncertain about a possible comeback on the pro tour. Janković eventually announced her retirement in July 2022, saying she has accepted that her body no longer allows her to play professional tennis and that she would make her health and her child a priority.

== Rivalries ==
=== Janković vs. Ivanovic ===
A prominent rivalry in women's tennis was the one between Janković and fellow Fed Cup teammate and Serbian compatriot Ana Ivanovic. They have met 12 times, with Ivanovic leading 9–3 overall. Seven of their eleven meetings have come at important stages of tournaments, while two have come at Grand Slam tournaments; Janković trails in both categories 1–6 and 0–2 respectively. Both players were touted as future top players following their breakthrough in 2007 and 2008, however, both have since underperformed on the WTA Tour and dropped out of the Top 10 in contrasting circumstances. Matches between Janković and Ivanovic are often given the nickname "The Battle of Serbia". Since the end of 2008, both have struggled at the Grand Slams, with Janković only being able to reach the semi-finals of the 2010 French Open and the quarter-finals of the 2013 French Open and Ivanovic the quarter-finals of the 2012 US Open and 2014 Australian Open, and the semi-finals of the 2015 French Open.

Their most important meeting to date was in the semifinals of the 2008 French Open; the match was one of historic proportions as it would decide which of the two would become the first Serbian player, male or female, to gain the world No. 1 ranking. In a match that lasted three sets and saw one player try to gain authority over the other, Ivanovic prevailed; the result saw Ivanovic claim the world No. 1 ranking for the first time, however Janković would herself claim the ranking later that year.

The pair were involved in a long-running feud in early 2010, arising from Ivanovic's decision not to play in Serbia's Fed Cup World Group play-off against Slovakia due to her poor form at the time. They met in a controversial encounter at the Madrid Premier Mandatory tournament in May that year, in which Janković appeared to criticise and imitate Ivanovic's fist-pumping habit following a three-set victory. It was only Janković's third (and most recent to date) victory against Ivanovic, after previously winning in 2006 and 2008.

At Indian Wells in 2011, Janković was the defending champion, but Ivanovic defeated her in the fourth round, ending her title defence. That would be their last meeting in a WTA Tour match until the 2013 Australian Open, where Ivanovic prevailed in the third round. Their most recent meeting was in the semi-finals of the Porsche Tennis Grand Prix in 2014 with Janković losing again in straight sets.

List of all matches

No.	Year	Tournament	Surface	Round	Winner	Score	Length	A.I.	J.J.
1.	2005	(Switzerland) Zürich	Hard (i)	R16	Ivanovic	6–2, 6–1	0:51	1	0
2.	2006	(United States) Los Angeles	Hard	QF	Janković	6–4, 7–6^{(8–6)}	1:37	1	1
3.	2006	(Canada) Montréal	Hard	R16	Ivanovic	Walkover	N/A	1	1
4.	2007	(Japan) Tokyo	Carpet (i)	QF	Ivanovic	3–6, 6–4, 6–2	1:42	2	1
5.	2007	(United States) Amelia Island	Clay	QF	Ivanovic	7–5, 6–3	1:28	3	1
6.	2007	(United States) Los Angeles	Hard	SF	Ivanovic	4–6, 6–3, 7–5	2:30	4	1
7.	2008	(United States) Indian Wells Open	Hard	SF	Ivanovic	7–6^{(7–3)}, 6–3	1:25	5	1
8.	2008	(France) French Open	Clay	SF	Ivanovic	6–4, 3–6, 6–4	2:15	6	1
9.	2008	(Qatar) Doha	Hard	Round Robin	Janković	6–3, 6–4	1:29	6	2
10.	2010	(Spain) Madrid	Clay	R32	Janković	4–6, 6–4, 6–1	1:50	6	3
11.	2011	(United States) Indian Wells	Hard	R16	Ivanovic	6–4, 6–2	1:24	7	3
12.	2013	(Australia) Melbourne	Hard	R32	Ivanovic	7–5, 6–3	1:23	8	3
13.	2014	(Germany) Stuttgart	Clay	SF	Ivanovic	6–3, 7–5	1:28	9	3

=== Janković vs. Zvonareva ===
Jelena Janković and Vera Zvonareva have met 14 times with Zvonareva leading their head-to-head 8–6. Their first meeting was in 2005 with Zvonareva winning a second round match in Rome.

They met six times in 2008 with Janković winning four of the six meetings, including three consecutive times in three consecutive tournaments during the fall. The third match in this streak was the final of the Kremlin Cup, which was the third consecutive title won by Janković in a stretch which also included titles in Beijing and Stuttgart. Janković had defeated Zvonareva on her way to the two titles which preceded the Kremlin Cup. However, Zvonareva would defeat Janković at the WTA Tour Championships later that year; this would be the start of an ongoing five-match winning streak against Janković.

Their only meeting at a Grand Slam tournament was at Wimbledon in 2010, in the tournament's fourth round. Zvonareva won, reaching her first quarter-finals of the grass court Major (and eventually went on to reach the final), after Janković retired whilst trailing in the second set.

Their most recent meeting was at the Qatar Ladies Open in 2011 with Zvonareva winning in three sets. It was her fifth straight victory over Janković, dating back to 2008.

List of all matches

No.	Year	Tournament	Surface	Round	Winner	Score	Length	J.J.	V.Z.
1.	2004	(Austria) Linz	Hard (i)	QF	Janković	6–4, 6–4		1	0
2.	2005	(Italy) Rome	Clay	R32	Zvonareva	6–4, 6–1		1	1
3.	2006	(United States) Cincinnati Open	Hard	QF	Zvonareva	6–1, 6–1		1	2
4.	2007	(Australia) Auckland	Hard	F	Janković	7–6^{(11–9)}, 5–7, 6–3		2	2
5.	2008	(United States) Miami Open	Hard	SF	Janković	6–1, 6–4		3	2
6.	2008	(United States) Charleston	Clay	QF	Zvonareva	6–2, 3–6, 6–2		3	3
7.	2008	(China) Beijing	Hard	SF	Janković	6–4, 2–6, 6–4		4	3
8.	2008	(Germany) Stuttgart	Hard (i)	QF	Janković	7–6^{(10–8)}, 7–6^{(7–5)}		5	3
9.	2008	(Russia) Moscow	Hard	F	Janković	6–2, 6–4		6	3
10.	2008	(Qatar) Doha	Hard	RR	Zvonareva	2–6, 6–3, 6–4		6	4
11.	2010	(United Arab Emirates) Dubai	Hard	R16	Zvonareva	6–3, 6–2		6	5
12.	2010	(United Kingdom) Wimbledon	Grass	R16	Zvonareva	6–1, 3–0 RET		6	6
13.	2010	(Qatar) Doha	Hard	QF	Zvonareva	6–3, 6–0		6	7
14.	2011	(Qatar) Doha	Hard	SF	Zvonareva	6–1, 2–6, 6–4		6	8

=== Janković vs. Venus Williams ===
Jelena Janković and Venus Williams have met fourteen times and each player has won seven times. Janković leads 4–2 on clay courts and 1–0 on grass, whilst Venus leads 4–1 on hard. Their rivalry is one of the most competitive and even in women's tennis. Only three of their matches have been decided in straight sets: their first meeting in the quarter-finals of the 2005 East of the West Bank Classic, which Venus won; the second was in the quarter-finals of the 2010 Internazionali BNL d'Italia which Janković won with 6–0, 6–1; this was the worst ever defeat in Venus Williams' entire career, and their third and most recent meeting in the second round of the 2012 Family Circle Cup, which Venus won in straight sets.

They have met three times in Grand Slam tournaments. Janković caused an upset at Wimbledon in 2006 where she defeated the defending champion in the third round, winning in three sets. They met twice at the Majors in 2007, Janković winning at the French Open, and Williams winning at the US Open in 2007. Both matches required a third set.

They have also met twice at the WTA Tour Championships, both times in the semifinals with Williams winning in three sets on both occasions. Their most recent meeting transpired in the 2017 BNP Paribas Open in Indian Wells, California. Janković appeared on her way to victory in this second round meeting at 6–1, 4–1 up before Williams came racing back to win a 2nd set tiebreak and force a decider, which she proceeded to win 6–1 en route to the quarterfinals.

List of all matches

No.	Year	Tournament	Surface	Round	Winner	Score	Length	J.J.	V.W.
1.	2005	(United States) Stanford	Hard	QF	V. Williams	6–3, 6–3	1:44	0	1
2.	2006	(Italy) Rome	Clay	QF	V. Williams	5–7, 6–4, 6–1	2:16	0	2
3.	2006	(United Kingdom) Wimbledon	Grass	R32	Janković	7–6^{8}, 4–6, 6–4	2:27	1	2
4.	2007	(United States) Charleston	Clay	SF	Janković	3–6, 6–3, 7–6^{5}	2:32	2	2
5.	2007	(France) French Open	Clay	R32	Janković	6–4, 4–6, 6–1	1:53	3	2
6.	2007	(United States) US Open	Hard	QF	V. Williams	4–6, 6–1, 7–6^{4}	2:27	3	3
7.	2008	(Italy) Rome	Clay	QF	Janković	5–7, 6–2, 6–3	2:28	4	3
8.	2008	(Germany) Stuttgart	Hard	SF	Janković	6–7^{10}, 7–5, 6–2	2:45	5	3
9.	2008	(Qatar) Doha	Hard	SF	V. Williams	6–2, 2–6, 6–3	2:12	5	4
10.	2009	(Qatar) Doha	Hard	SF	V. Williams	5–7, 6–3, 6–4	2:35	5	5
11.	2010	(Italy) Rome	Clay	QF	Janković	6–0, 6–1	1:00	6	5
12.	2012	(United States) Charleston	Clay	R32	V. Williams	7–5, 6–0	1:30	6	6
13.	2015	Hong Kong	Hard	SF	Janković	6–4, 7–5	2:06	7	6
14.	2017	(United States) Indian Wells Open	Hard	R64	V. Williams	1–6, 7–6^{5}, 6–1	1:45	7	7

=== Janković vs. Serena Williams ===
Janković and Serena Williams have met 14 times, with Serena leading 10–4 overall. Their first seven matches and the last match were on hardcourts, which Serena leads 7–3. The eighth and tenth match were on clay and the ninth was on grass.

In 2004, they played their first match in San Diego; Serena won in three sets. The second match was at the 2005 Dubai Tennis Championships semifinal, with Janković causing an upset (Serena was world No. 4). When Janković was leading 6–0, 4–3, Serena retired. She is one of eight players who won a 6–0 set against Serena. The others are Venus Williams, Mary Joe Fernández, Justine Henin, Patty Schnyder, Anabel Medina Garrigues, Simona Halep, and Johanna Konta.

Janković won at the LA Women's Tennis Championships in 2006 in straight sets, and Serena won at the Australian Open in 2007. At the Australian Open in 2008 quarterfinal, Janković won in two sets.

At the 2008 Sony Ericsson Open, Miami, they met in a final for the first time. Serena won in three sets. They played again in the final, and again in USA – at the US Open in 2008. Serena won in two sets. In the second set Janković had 5–3 and three consecutive set points on Serena serve. Later, when she was serving for the set at 5–4, she missed one more set point. However, Serena saved all set points and won four games in a row for US Open title.

Two years later, in the semifinal of the 2010 Internazionali BNL d'Italia Janković won in three sets, saving match point in doing so and coming back from 5–2 down in the final set tie-break. In the quarter-final she had defeated Venus Williams, becoming the only woman to defeat both of the Williams sisters in a 24-hour period. Their opening round match at the Tennis at the 2012 Summer Olympics was their first and only match on grass. Janković wasn't seeded and Serena won in two sets before going on to win the gold medal.

At the final of the 2013 Family Circle Cup, Charleston, Serena won in three sets. Again in 2013, at China Open, they met in the final and Serena won in two sets. At WTA Championships Serena won their semifinal match after losing second set convincingly, 6–2.

Their most recent meeting occurred in the quarterfinal of the 2014 Western & Southern Open, where Serena won in straight sets. Serena improved to 6–0 record since it was 4–4.

=== Janković vs. Justine Henin ===
Jelena Janković and Justine Henin met ten times over a span of six years with Henin prevailing each time. They never met on carpet or grass. Five of their matches were on clay and five on hard courts. Six of their matches went three sets. The majority (7) of their matches occurred during the 2007 season. They met twice in Grand Slams (2006 U.S. Open semifinals, 2007 French Open semifinals) as well as the round-robin stage of the 2007 tour championships. Despite their lopsided head-to-head results, their matches were always highly competitive.

List of all matches

No.	Year	Tournament	Surface	Round	Winner	Score	Length	J.J.	J.H.
1.	2005	(United States) Charleston	Clay	R64	J. Henin	5–7, 6–4, 6–3		0	1
2.	2006	(United States) US Open	Hard	SF	J. Henin	4–6, 6–4, 6–0		0	2
3.	2007	Doha, Qatar	Hard	SF	J. Henin	6–7^{5}, 6–2, 6–4		0	3
4.	2007	(Poland) Warsaw	Clay	SF	J. Henin	7–5, 2–6, 6–4		0	4
5.	2007	(Germany) Berlin Open	Clay	QF	J. Henin	3–6, 6–4, 6–4		0	5
6.	2007	(France) French Open	Clay	SF	J. Henin	6–2, 6–2		0	6
7.	2007	(Canada) Toronto	Hard	F	J. Henin	7–6^{3}, 7–5		0	7
8.	2007	(Germany) Stuttgart	Hard	SF	J. Henin	7–6^{2}, 7–5		0	8
9.	2007	(Spain) Madrid	Hard	QF	J. Henin	6–2, 6–2		0	9
10.	2010	Germany	Clay	QF	J. Henin	3–6, 7–6^{2}, 6–3		0	10

== Playing style ==
Jelena Janković is a defensive baseliner, and is often regarded as a counterpuncher. Janković is known for being able to slide effectively on all surfaces. Janković has very consistent groundstrokes and prefers to go down the line more often than crosscourt. Her biggest weapon is her two-handed backhand, especially down the line. She also has a solid forehand, although she typically hits fewer winners off that side as she can have trouble hitting through the ball on that wing. Her net game has improved as a result of additional doubles play, meaning that she is now able to hit effective drive, drop, and swinging volleys. Her main weakness early on in her career was her serve. She would typically spin it in on the first and second serve which can lead to her getting broken many times in matches. After 2008, her serve became more reliable and aggressive. Her weakest surface is considered grass and her best surface is fast hard courts, where she can use her defensive skills and speed to win matches. However, given the fact that six of her fifteen titles have come on clay, this could also be considered her best surface. One of the most high-profile achievements of her career occurred on grass in the third round of the 2015 Wimbledon Championships, when she defeated Petra Kvitová, the defending champion, a two-time Wimbledon title holder, then-no. 2 in the world (when Janković had dropped to world no. 30), and the only player who had defeated Serena Williams that year. Janković's ups and downs are often caused by her fragile mindset (see US Open 2006 vs Henin), and they have resulted in her being nicknamed 'Queen Chaos.'

== Personal life ==
Janković was the subject of the 2008 autobiographical documentary, Jelenin svet (Jelena's World), featuring Justine Henin, Svetlana Kuznetsova, Ana Ivanovic, Elena Dementieva, Anna Chakvetadze and other notable players.

On 5 December 2007, Janković became a UNICEF National Ambassador for Serbia, for Children's Fund. "I am happy to have become a UNICEF ambassador for Serbia. This is a great honour for me and I will try to justify the role that has been given to me", she said. Janković is the second Serbian tennis star to have volunteered to help promote the rights of children and collect funds for UNICEF after Ana Ivanovic became an ambassador in September.

Janković is a cousin of Serbian singer Dijana Janković, internationally better known as Didi J. On 6 April 2021, Janković gave birth to a baby girl in Belgrade, Serbia.

== Endorsements ==
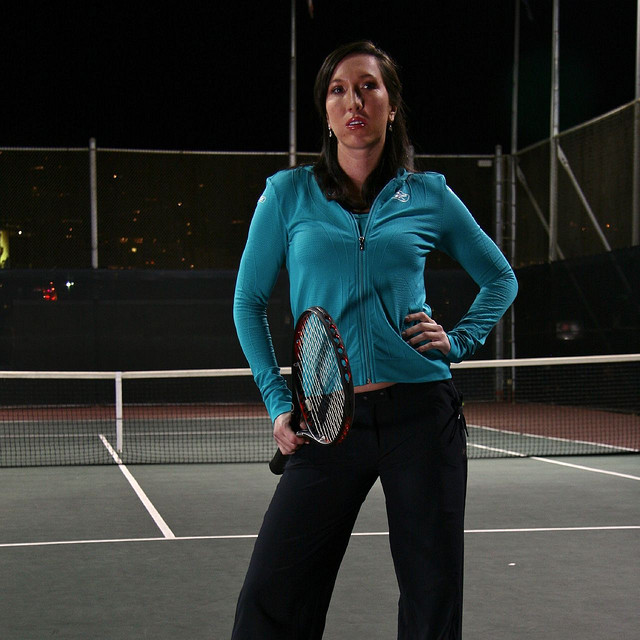
Janković promoting Reebok in 2007

Janković is currently sponsored by Italian sportswear company Fila. Previously, Janković had endorsed Anta and Reebok sportswear, and had her own line with them for her tournament wear. Janković also has an endorsement with Prince Sports: in her early career until 2007, she played with the original Prince O3 Red; from 2008 to 2010 she used the Prince O3 SpeedPort Pro White; from 2011 to 2013 Janković played with different types of racquets and in 2012 and 2013 she chose blacked out ones; since January 2014 Janković has been playing with the Prince O3 Red LS.

== Career statistics ==
=== Grand Slam performance timelines ===
==== Singles ====
Key
W	F	SF	QF	#R	RR	Q#	DNQ	A	NH

(W) winner; (F) finalist; (SF) semifinalist; (QF) quarterfinalist; (#R) rounds 4, 3, 2, 1; (RR) round-robin stage; (Q#) qualification round; (DNQ) did not qualify; (A) absent; (NH) not held; (SR) strike rate (events won / competed); (W–L) win–loss record.
To avoid confusion and double counting, these charts are updated at the conclusion of a tournament or when the player's participation has ended.

Tournament	2002	2003	2004	2005	2006	2007	2008	2009	2010	2011	2012	2013	2014	2015	2016	2017	SR	W–L	Win%
Australian Open	A	2R	2R	2R	2R	4R	SF	4R	3R	2R	4R	3R	4R	1R	2R	3R	0 / 15	29–15	66%
French Open	A	Q2	1R	1R	3R	SF	SF	4R	SF	4R	2R	QF	4R	1R	1R	1R	0 / 14	31–14	69%
Wimbledon	A	Q1	1R	3R	4R	4R	4R	3R	4R	1R	1R	2R	1R	4R	2R	1R	0 / 14	21–14	60%
US Open	Q1	Q3	2R	3R	SF	QF	F	2R	3R	3R	3R	4R	4R	1R	2R	1R	0 / 14	32–14	70%
Win–loss	0–0	1–1	2–4	5–4	11–4	15–4	19–4	9–4	12–4	6–4	6–4	10–4	9–4	3–4	3–4	2–4	0 / 57	113–57	66%

==== Doubles ====
Tournament	2005	2006	2007	2008	2009	2010	2011	2012	2013	2014	2015	2016	2017	SR	W–L	Win%
Australian Open	2R	1R	1R	3R	A	2R	A	A	3R	2R	1R	1R	1R	0 / 10	6–10	38%
French Open	1R	1R	2R	A	A	A	2R	A	3R	3R	A	A	1R	0 / 7	5–7	42%
Wimbledon	1R	2R	A	A	A	3R	1R	1R	QF	1R	1R	3R	1R	0 / 10	8–9	47%
US Open	2R	3R	1R	A	A	1R	2R	1R	3R	3R	3R	1R	2R	0 / 11	11–11	50%
Win–loss	2–4	3–4	1–3	2–1	0–0	3–2	2–3	0–2	8–4	4–4	2–3	2–3	1–4	0 / 38	30–37	45%

==== Mixed doubles ====
Tournament	2004	2005	2006	2007	2008	2009	2010	2011	2012	2013	2014	2015	2016	2017	SR	W–L	Win%
Australian Open	A	A	1R	2R	A	A	A	A	2R	A	A	A	A	A	0 / 3	2–3	40%
French Open	A	1R	A	A	A	A	A	A	A	2R	A	A	2R	A	0 / 3	2–3	40%
Wimbledon	1R	2R	A	W	A	A	A	A	A	A	A	A	A	A	1 / 3	7–2	78%
US Open	A	1R	A	A	A	A	A	A	A	A	A	A	A	A	0 / 1	0–1	0%
Win–loss	0–1	1–3	0–1	7–1	0–0	0–0	0–0	0–0	1–1	1–1	0–0	0–0	1–1	0–0	1 / 10	11–9	55%

=== Grand Slam tournament finals ===
==== Singles: 1 (runner-up) ====
Result	Year	Championship	Surface	Opponent	Score
Loss	2008	US Open	Hard	(United States) Serena Williams	4–6, 5–7

==== Mixed doubles: 1 (title) ====
Result	Year	Championship	Surface	Partner	Opponent	Score
Win	2007	Wimbledon	Grass	(United Kingdom) Jamie Murray	(Australia) Alicia Molik; (Sweden) Jonas Björkman	6–4, 3–6, 6–1

== Awards and honours ==
In 2017, she received the Order of Karađorđe's Star.

== See also ==
- ITF World Champions
- List of Grand Slam girls' singles champions
- List of Wimbledon Mixed Doubles champions
- List of WTA number 1 ranked singles tennis players
- Serbia Fed Cup team
- Tennis performance timeline comparison (women) (1978–present)
- Jelenin svet
- List of UNICEF Goodwill Ambassadors
- Sports in Serbia

Sporting positions
Preceded by: Ana Ivanovic; Serena Williams	World No. 1 August 11, 2008 – August 17, 2008; October 6, 2008 – February 1, 2009	Succeeded by Ana Ivanovic; Serena Williams
Awards
Preceded by Ana Ivanovic	WTA Most Improved Player; 2006	Succeeded by Ana Ivanovic
Preceded by Olivera Jevtić	Sportswoman of The Year by Olympic Committee of Serbia; 2007, 2008	Succeeded by Nađa Higl
Preceded by Svetlana Kuznetsova	WTA Diamond Aces; 2008	Succeeded by Ana Ivanovic
Preceded by Justine Henin	ITF World Champion; 2008	Succeeded by Serena Williams
