= Lilia Osterloh =

American tennis player (born 1978)

- Country (sports): United States
- Residence: Palo Alto & Newport Beach
- Born: April 7, 1978 (age 47) Columbus, Ohio, U.S.
- Height: 1.70 m (5 ft 7 in)
- Turned pro: August 1997
- Retired: 2011
- Plays: Right (two-handed backhand)
- College: Stanford
- Prize money: $1,349,462

Singles
- Career record: 385–366
- Career titles: 3 ITF
- Highest ranking: No. 41 (April 23, 2001)

Grand Slam singles results
- Australian Open: 1R (1999, 2000, 2001, 2002, 2008)
- French Open: 2R (1999)
- Wimbledon: 4R (2000)
- US Open: 4R (2000)

Doubles
- Career record: 192–215
- Career titles: 3 WTA, 10 ITF
- Highest ranking: No. 77 (August 23, 1999)

Grand Slam doubles results
- Australian Open: 2R (2001)
- French Open: 2R (1999)
- Wimbledon: 2R (1998, 1999, 2008)
- US Open: 3R (1998)

Lilia Osterloh (born April 7, 1978) is a former tennis player from the United States.

Osterloh became professional in August 1997. She reached her highest singles ranking in April 2001, when she became world No. 41. Her career-high doubles ranking is world No. 77, which she reached in August 1999.

In 2013, Osterloh graduated from Stanford University with a degree in International Relations.

== College ==
While at Stanford, she won the Honda Sports Award as the nation's best female tennis player in 1997.

== WTA Tour finals ==
=== Doubles: 3 (3 titles) ===
Winner — Legend (pre/post 2009) Grand Slam tournaments Tier I / Premier M & Premier 5 Tier II / Premier (0–0) Tier III, IV & V / International (3–0)	Finals by surface Hard (3–0) Grass (0–0) Clay (0–0) Carpet (0–0)

Result	W/L	Date	Tournament	Tier	Surface	Partner	Opponents	Score
Win	1–0	Oct 2000	Shanghai, China	Tier IVa	Hard (i)	(Thailand) Tamarine Tanasugarn	(Italy) Rita Grande (United States) Meghann Shaughnessy	7–5, 6–1
Win	2–0	Dec 2007	Auckland, New Zealand	Tier IV	Hard	(Ukraine) Mariya Koryttseva	(Germany) Martina Müller (Czech Republic) Barbora Záhlavová-Strýcová	6–3, 6–4
Win	3–0	Oct 2010	Osaka, Japan	International	Hard	(Chinese Taipei) Chang Kai-chen	(Japan) Shuko Aoyama (Japan) Rika Fujiwara	6–0, 6–3
