= 2018 ASB Classic – Men's singles =

Men's singles
- 2018 ASB Classic

Final
- Champion: (Spain) Roberto Bautista Agut
- Runner-up: (Argentina) Juan Martín del Potro
- Score: 6–1, 4–6, 7–5

Details
- Draw: 28 (4 Q / 3 WC )
- Seeds: 8

Events
Singles	men	women
Doubles	men	women
← 2017 ·	ATP Auckland Open	· 2019 →

Jack Sock was the defending champion, but lost in the second round to Peter Gojowczyk.

Roberto Bautista Agut won the title, defeating Juan Martín del Potro in the final, 6–1, 4–6, 7–5.

== Seeds ==
The top four seeds received a bye into the second round.

1. (United States) Jack Sock (second round)
2. (Argentina) Juan Martín del Potro (final)
3. (United States) Sam Querrey (second round)
4. (United States) John Isner (second round)
5. (Spain) Roberto Bautista Agut (champion)
6. (Uruguay) Pablo Cuevas (second round)
7. (Spain) David Ferrer (semifinals)
8. (Russia) Andrey Rublev (withdrew)

== Draw ==
=== Key ===
- Q = Qualifier
- WC = Wild card
- LL = Lucky loser
- Alt = Alternate
- SE = Special exempt
- PR = Protected ranking
- ITF = ITF entry
- JE = Junior exempt
- w/o = Walkover
- r = Retired
- d = Defaulted
- SR = Special ranking

=== Finals ===
Semifinals
(Netherlands) Robin Haase	7^{9}	6^{3}	6^{5}
5	(Spain) Roberto Bautista Agut	6^{7}	7^{7}	7^{7}
7	(Spain) David Ferrer	4	4
2	(Argentina) Juan Martín del Potro	6	6

Final
5	(Spain) Roberto Bautista Agut	6	4	7
2	(Argentina) Juan Martín del Potro	1	6	5

=== Top half ===
First round
Q	(United States) T Smyczek	3	6	3
(Germany) P Gojowczyk	6	4	6
(Netherlands) R Haase	0	7^{8}	6
Q	(Norway) C Ruud	6	6^{6}	3
WC	(Greece) S Tsitsipas	3	7^{7}	3
LL	(Slovakia) L Lacko	6	6^{5}	6
(Czech Republic) J Veselý	3	6	7^{9}
Q	(Moldova) R Albot	6	1	6^{7}
(United States) S Johnson	7	7^{7}
LL	(Italy) L Caruana	5	6^{4}
WC	(New Zealand) M Venus	2	1
5	(Spain) R Bautista Agut	6	6

Second round
1	(United States) J Sock	3	3
(Germany) P Gojowczyk	6	6
(Netherlands) R Haase	7^{7}	6
LL	(Slovakia) L Lacko	6^{4}	3
3	(United States) S Querrey	4	7^{12}	6^{5}
(Czech Republic) J Veselý	6	6^{10}	7^{7}
(United States) S Johnson	6	2	1
5	(Spain) R Bautista Agut	2	6	6

Quarterfinals
(Germany) P Gojowczyk	4	4
(Netherlands) R Haase	6	6
(Czech Republic) J Veselý	6^{1}	2
5	(Spain) R Bautista Agut	7^{7}	6

Semifinals
(Netherlands) R Haase	7^{9}	6^{3}	6^{5}
5	(Spain) R Bautista Agut	6^{7}	7^{7}	7^{7}

=== Bottom half ===
First round
7	(Spain) D Ferrer	7^{9}	6
WC	(China) Y Wu	6^{7}	4
(United States) D Young	7^{10}	4	2
(Portugal) J Sousa	6^{8}	6	6
(South Korea) H Chung	6	5	6
LL	(United States) T Sandgren	3	7	3
6	(Uruguay) P Cuevas	6	6
LL	(Japan) T Daniel	3	2
(Japan) Y Sugita	1	6	4
(Russia) K Khachanov	6	3	6
(Canada) D Shapovalov	6	6
Q	(Brazil) R Dutra Silva	3	2

Second round
7	(Spain) D Ferrer	6	6
(Portugal) J Sousa	2	2
(South Korea) H Chung	7^{7}	5	6
4	(United States) J Isner	6^{3}	7	2
6	(Uruguay) P Cuevas	2	6^{4}
(Russia) K Khachanov	6	7^{7}
(Canada) D Shapovalov	2	4
2	(Argentina) JM del Potro	6	6

Quarterfinals
7	(Spain) D Ferrer	6	6
(South Korea) H Chung	3	2
(Russia) K Khachanov	6^{4}	3
2	(Argentina) JM del Potro	7^{7}	6

Semifinals
7	(Spain) D Ferrer	4	4
2	(Argentina) JM del Potro	6	6

== Qualifying ==
=== Seeds ===
1. (Moldova) Radu Albot (qualified)
2. (Slovakia) Lukáš Lacko (qualifying competition, lucky loser)
3. (United States) Tennys Sandgren (qualifying competition, lucky loser)
4. (Slovenia) Blaž Kavčič (first round)
5. (Japan) Taro Daniel (qualifying competition, lucky loser)
6. (Brazil) Rogério Dutra Silva (qualified)
7. (United States) Tim Smyczek (qualified)
8. (Norway) Casper Ruud (qualified)

=== Qualifiers ===
1. (Moldova) Radu Albot
2. (Brazil) Rogério Dutra Silva
3. (Norway) Casper Ruud
4. (United States) Tim Smyczek

=== Lucky losers ===
1. (Slovakia) Lukáš Lacko
2. (United States) Tennys Sandgren
3. (Japan) Taro Daniel
4. (Italy) Liam Caruana

=== Qualifying draw ===
==== First qualifier ====
First round
1	(Moldova) Radu Albot	7	6
(United Kingdom) Brydan Klein	5	4
WC	(New Zealand) Ajeet Rai	1	2
5	(Japan) Taro Daniel	6	6

Qualifying competition
1	(Moldova) Radu Albot	5	6	6
5	(Japan) Taro Daniel	7	3	4

==== Second qualifier ====
First round
2	(Slovakia) Lukáš Lacko	6	7
(New Zealand) Rubin Statham	1	5
(Republic of Ireland) Sam Barry	2	6	5
6	(Brazil) Rogério Dutra Silva	6	3	7

Qualifying competition
2	(Slovakia) Lukáš Lacko	5	4
6	(Brazil) Rogério Dutra Silva	7	6

==== Third qualifier ====
First round
3	(United States) Tennys Sandgren	7^{7}	7^{7}
(Poland) Michał Przysiężny	6^{4}	6^{4}
(France) Stéphane Robert	3	7^{7}	6^{3}
8	(Norway) Casper Ruud	6	6^{3}	7^{7}

Qualifying competition
3	(United States) Tennys Sandgren	7^{8}	6^{5}	4
8	(Norway) Casper Ruud	6^{6}	7^{7}	6

==== Fourth qualifier ====
First round
4	(Slovenia) Blaž Kavčič	3	4
(Italy) Liam Caruana	6	6
WC	(New Zealand) Finn Reynolds	1	2
7	(United States) Tim Smyczek	6	6

Qualifying competition
(Italy) Liam Caruana	4	2
7	(United States) Tim Smyczek	6	6
