= 2019 ASB Classic – Women's doubles =

Women's doubles
- 2019 ASB Classic

Final
- Champions: (Canada) Eugenie Bouchard (United States) Sofia Kenin
- Runners-up: (New Zealand) Paige Mary Hourigan (United States) Taylor Townsend
- Score: 1–6, 6–1, [10–7]

Details
- Draw: 16
- Seeds: 4

Events
Singles	men	women
Doubles	men	women
← 2018 ·	WTA Auckland Open	· 2020 →

Sara Errani and Bibiane Schoofs were the defending champions, but Errani was unable to participate due to her doping suspension. Schoofs played alongside Desirae Krawczyk, but lost in the first round to Han Xinyun and Darija Jurak.

Eugenie Bouchard and Sofia Kenin won the title, defeating Paige Mary Hourigan and Taylor Townsend in the final, 1–6, 6–1, [10–7].

== Seeds ==
1. (Romania) Raluca Olaru / (United States) Abigail Spears (first round)
2. (Belgium) Kirsten Flipkens / (Sweden) Johanna Larsson (semifinals)
3. (United States) Kaitlyn Christian / (United States) Asia Muhammad (first round)
4. (China) Han Xinyun / (Croatia) Darija Jurak (semifinals)

== Draw ==
=== Key ===
- Q = Qualifier
- WC = Wild card
- LL = Lucky loser
- Alt = Alternate
- SE = Special exempt
- PR = Protected ranking
- ITF = ITF entry
- JE = Junior exempt
- w/o = Walkover
- r = Retired
- d = Defaulted
- SR = Special ranking

=== Draw ===
First round
1	(Romania) R Olaru (United States) A Spears	3	4
(Russia) A Panova (Germany) L Siegemund	6	6
(Netherlands) L Kerkhove (United States) S Santamaria	6	3	[6]
(Canada) E Bouchard (United States) S Kenin	2	6	[10]
4	(China) X Han (Croatia) D Jurak	7^{7}	7
(United States) D Krawczyk (Netherlands) B Schoofs	6^{5}	5
(Hungary) T Babos (Germany) J Görges	4	6	[10]
(Chile) A Guarachi (New Zealand) E Routliffe	6	1	[5]
WC	(New Zealand) V Ivanov (New Zealand) E Ventura	1	5
WC	(New Zealand) PM Hourigan (United States) T Townsend	6	7
(Australia) M Adamczak (Australia) J Moore	3	6	[12]
3	(United States) K Christian (United States) A Muhammad	6	3	[10]
(Spain) A Parra Santonja (Switzerland) J Teichmann	4	6	[10]
(Australia) E Perez (Australia) Ar Rodionova	6	0	[3]
(Slovakia) V Kužmová (Switzerland) S Vögele	4	2
2	(Belgium) K Flipkens (Sweden) J Larsson	6	6

Quarterfinals
(Russia) A Panova (Germany) L Siegemund
(Canada) E Bouchard (United States) S Kenin	w/o
4	(China) X Han (Croatia) D Jurak	6	6
(Hungary) T Babos (Germany) J Görges	2	4
WC	(New Zealand) PM Hourigan (United States) T Townsend	3	6	[10]
(Australia) M Adamczak (Australia) J Moore	6	1	[8]
(Spain) A Parra Santonja (Switzerland) J Teichmann	4	5
2	(Belgium) K Flipkens (Sweden) J Larsson	6	7

Semifinals
(Canada) E Bouchard (United States) S Kenin	6^{5}	6	[10]
4	(China) X Han (Croatia) D Jurak	7^{7}	4	[8]
WC	(New Zealand) PM Hourigan (United States) T Townsend	6	7
2	(Belgium) K Flipkens (Sweden) J Larsson	3	5

Final
(Canada) E Bouchard (United States) S Kenin	1	6	[10]
WC	(New Zealand) PM Hourigan (United States) T Townsend	6	1	[7]
