= 2019 ASB Classic – Men's doubles =

Men's doubles
- 2019 ASB Classic

Final
- Champions: (Japan) Ben McLachlan (Germany) Jan-Lennard Struff
- Runners-up: (South Africa) Raven Klaasen (New Zealand) Michael Venus
- Score: 6–3, 6–4

Details
- Draw: 16
- Seeds: 4

Events
Singles	men	women
Doubles	men	women
← 2018 ·	ATP Auckland Open	· 2020 →

Oliver Marach and Mate Pavić were the defending champions, but lost to Ben McLachlan and Jan-Lennard Struff in the semifinals.

McLachlan and Struff went on to win the title, defeating Raven Klaasen and Michael Venus in the final, 6–3, 6–4.

== Seeds ==
1. (Austria) Oliver Marach / (Croatia) Mate Pavić (semifinals)
2. (United States) Bob Bryan / (United States) Mike Bryan (semifinals)
3. (South Africa) Raven Klaasen / (New Zealand) Michael Venus (final)
4. (Poland) Łukasz Kubot / (Argentina) Horacio Zeballos (first round)

== Draw ==
=== Key ===
- Q = Qualifier
- WC = Wild card
- LL = Lucky loser
- Alt = Alternate
- SE = Special exempt
- PR = Protected ranking
- ITF = ITF entry
- JE = Junior exempt
- w/o = Walkover
- r = Retired
- d = Defaulted
- SR = Special ranking

=== Draw ===
First round
1	(Austria) O Marach (Croatia) M Pavić	6^{3}	6	[10]
(Italy) M Berrettini (Italy) F Fognini	7^{7}	3	[4]
(Netherlands) R Haase (Netherlands) M Middelkoop	6	4	[8]
(Finland) H Kontinen (Denmark) F Nielsen	3	6	[10]
4	(Poland) Ł Kubot (Argentina) H Zeballos	6^{5}	6	[7]
(Japan) B McLachlan (Germany) J-L Struff	7^{7}	2	[10]
Alt	(Austria) P Oswald (Germany) T Pütz	4	6^{1}
(New Zealand) M Daniell (Netherlands) W Koolhof	6	7^{7}
(Argentina) G Pella (Portugal) J Sousa	6	6
WC	(United Kingdom) C Norrie (New Zealand) R Statham	4	2
(United Kingdom) D Inglot (Croatia) F Škugor	3	3
3	(South Africa) R Klaasen (New Zealand) M Venus	6	6
(United States) A Krajicek (New Zealand) A Sitak	6	6
WC	(New Zealand) A Rai (New Zealand) G Stoupe	3	2
(Netherlands) J-J Rojer (Romania) H Tecău	6	6^{2}	[9]
2	(United States) B Bryan (United States) M Bryan	3	7^{7}	[11]

Quarterfinals
1	(Austria) O Marach (Croatia) M Pavić	6	7^{7}
(Finland) H Kontinen (Denmark) F Nielsen	3	6^{4}
(Japan) B McLachlan (Germany) J-L Struff	7^{7}	7^{7}
(New Zealand) M Daniell (Netherlands) W Koolhof	6^{4}	6^{5}
(Argentina) G Pella (Portugal) J Sousa	5	3
3	(South Africa) R Klaasen (New Zealand) M Venus	7	6
(United States) A Krajicek (New Zealand) A Sitak	6^{6}	6	[2]
2	(United States) B Bryan (United States) M Bryan	7^{8}	2	[10]

Semifinals
1	(Austria) O Marach (Croatia) M Pavić	4	7^{8}	[9]
(Japan) B McLachlan (Germany) J-L Struff	6	6^{6}	[11]
3	(South Africa) R Klaasen (New Zealand) M Venus	6	6
2	(United States) B Bryan (United States) M Bryan	4	1

Final
(Japan) B McLachlan (Germany) J-L Struff	6	6
3	(South Africa) R Klaasen (New Zealand) M Venus	3	4
