= 2018 ASB Classic – Women's singles =

Women's singles
- 2018 ASB Classic

Final
- Champion: (Germany) Julia Görges
- Runner-up: (Denmark) Caroline Wozniacki
- Score: 6–4, 7–6^{(7–4)}

Details
- Draw: 32 (4 Q / 3 WC )
- Seeds: 8

Events
Singles	men	women
Doubles	men	women
← 2017 ·	WTA Auckland Open	· 2019 →

Lauren Davis was the defending champion, but lost in the first round to Sachia Vickery.

Julia Görges won the title, defeating Caroline Wozniacki in the final, 6–4, 7–6^{(7–4)}.

Wozniacki was in contention for the WTA No. 1 singles ranking at the start of the tournament. She was eliminated from contention when Simona Halep reached the quarterfinals in Shenzhen.

== Seeds ==
1. (Denmark) Caroline Wozniacki (final)
2. (Germany) Julia Görges (champion)
3. (Czech Republic) Barbora Strýcová (quarterfinals)
4. (Poland) Agnieszka Radwańska (quarterfinals)
5. (United States) Lauren Davis (first round)
6. (Kazakhstan) Yulia Putintseva (first round)
7. (Germany) Mona Barthel (first round)
8. (Croatia) Donna Vekić (first round)

== Draw ==
=== Finals ===
Semifinals
1	(Denmark) Caroline Wozniacki	6	6
Q	(United States) Sachia Vickery	4	4
(Chinese Taipei) Hsieh Su-wei	1	4
2	(Germany) Julia Görges	6	6

Final
1	(Denmark) Caroline Wozniacki	4	6^{4}
2	(Germany) Julia Görges	6	7^{7}

=== Top half ===
First round
1	(Denmark) C Wozniacki	6	6
(United States) M Brengle	3	0
(Croatia) P Martić	7^{7}	6
(Czech Republic) M Vondroušová	6^{2}	3
WC	(United States) S Kenin	6	6
Q	(Croatia) J Fett	4	4
(United States) V Lepchenko	6	6
7	(Germany) M Barthel	2	2
4	(Poland) A Radwańska	6	4	6
(Brazil) B Haddad Maia	2	6	2
(United States) C McHale	6	4	4
(United States) T Townsend	1	6	6
(Paraguay) V Cepede Royg	6	6
(Spain) L Arruabarrena	3	3
Q	(United States) S Vickery	6	6
5	(United States) L Davis	1	2

Second round
1	(Denmark) C Wozniacki	6	6
(Croatia) P Martić	2	2
WC	(United States) S Kenin	6	7^{8}
(United States) V Lepchenko	4	6^{6}
4	(Poland) A Radwańska	6	7
(United States) T Townsend	3	5
(Paraguay) V Cepede Royg	2	4
Q	(United States) S Vickery	6	6

Quarterfinals
1	(Denmark) C Wozniacki	4	6	6
WC	(United States) S Kenin	6	2	4
4	(Poland) A Radwańska	2	2
Q	(United States) S Vickery	6	6

Semifinals
1	(Denmark) C Wozniacki	6	6
Q	(United States) S Vickery	4	4

=== Bottom half ===
First round
6	(Kazakhstan) Y Putintseva	3	3
Q	(Belgium) Y Bonaventure	6	6
(Japan) N Hibino	0	3
(Chinese Taipei) S-w Hsieh	6	6
(Japan) K Nara	6^{5}	3
(Sweden) J Larsson	7^{7}	6
WC	(Italy) S Errani	4	7^{7}	4
3	(Czech Republic) B Strýcová	6	6^{3}	6
8	(Croatia) D Vekić	6^{5}	6	4
(Belgium) K Flipkens	7^{7}	3	6
(Slovenia) P Hercog	6	7
(Belgium) A Van Uytvanck	4	5
WC	(New Zealand) J Lewis	4	3
Q	(Slovakia) V Kužmová	6	6
(Puerto Rico) M Puig	4	6	2
2	(Germany) J Görges	6	4	6

Second round
Q	(Belgium) Y Bonaventure	4	3
(Chinese Taipei) S-w Hsieh	6	6
(Sweden) J Larsson	1	7^{7}	2
3	(Czech Republic) B Strýcová	6	6^{3}	6
(Belgium) K Flipkens	4	2
(Slovenia) P Hercog	6	6
Q	(Slovakia) V Kužmová	4	0
2	(Germany) J Görges	6	6

Quarterfinals
(Chinese Taipei) S-w Hsieh	0	6	6
3	(Czech Republic) B Strýcová	6	2	2
(Slovenia) P Hercog	4	4
2	(Germany) J Görges	6	6

Semifinals
(Chinese Taipei) S-w Hsieh	1	4
2	(Germany) J Görges	6	6

== Qualifying ==
=== Seeds ===
1. (Croatia) Jana Fett (qualified)
2. (Netherlands) Richèl Hogenkamp (first round)
3. (Switzerland) Viktorija Golubic (first round)
4. (United Kingdom) Naomi Broady (second round)
5. (Japan) Risa Ozaki (second round)
6. (Australia) Arina Rodionova (qualifying competition)
7. (United States) Sachia Vickery (qualified)
8. (Japan) Miyu Kato (qualifying competition)

=== Qualifiers ===
1. (Croatia) Jana Fett
2. (Belgium) Ysaline Bonaventure
3. (United States) Sachia Vickery
4. (Slovakia) Viktória Kužmová

=== Qualifying draw ===
==== First qualifier ====
First round
1	(Croatia) Jana Fett	6	6
(Bulgaria) Elitsa Kostova	2	1
WC	(New Zealand) Paige Mary Hourigan	3	4
(Netherlands) Bibiane Schoofs	6	6
(Spain) Sílvia Soler Espinosa	6	6
(Japan) Eri Hozumi	2	3
(Japan) Miharu Imanishi	1	7^{7}	1
8	(Japan) Miyu Kato	6	6^{4}	6

Second round
1	(Croatia) Jana Fett	7	6
(Netherlands) Bibiane Schoofs	5	1
(Spain) Sílvia Soler Espinosa	2	6	4
8	(Japan) Miyu Kato	6	1	6

Qualifying competition
1	(Croatia) Jana Fett	6	6
8	(Japan) Miyu Kato	3	4

==== Second qualifier ====
First round
2	(Netherlands) Richèl Hogenkamp	1	7^{7}	4
(Belgium) Ysaline Bonaventure	6	6^{3}	6
WC	(Australia) Sacha Jones	6	1	1
(United Kingdom) Katie Boulter	2	6	6
WC	(New Zealand) Erin Routliffe	6	1	3
(United States) Jamie Loeb	4	6	6
(Israel) Julia Glushko	1	5
6	(Australia) Arina Rodionova	6	7

Second round
(Belgium) Ysaline Bonaventure	6	6
(United Kingdom) Katie Boulter	1	1
(United States) Jamie Loeb	3	4
6	(Australia) Arina Rodionova	6	6

Qualifying competition
(Belgium) Ysaline Bonaventure	6	6
6	(Australia) Arina Rodionova	3	4

==== Third qualifier ====
First round
3	(Switzerland) Viktorija Golubic	6	5	2
(Croatia) Tereza Mrdeža	3	7	6
(Italy) Deborah Chiesa	3	6	6
Alt	(United Kingdom) Suzy Larkin	6	2	1
(Switzerland) Conny Perrin	6	6
(Belgium) Maryna Zanevska	4	3
(Poland) Magdalena Fręch	5	3
7	(United States) Sachia Vickery	7	6

Second round
(Croatia) Tereza Mrdeža	1	4
(Italy) Deborah Chiesa	6	6
(Switzerland) Conny Perrin	3	0
7	(United States) Sachia Vickery	6	6

Qualifying competition
(Italy) Deborah Chiesa	4	3
7	(United States) Sachia Vickery	6	6

==== Fourth qualifier ====
First round
4	(United Kingdom) Naomi Broady	6	6
(United States) Louisa Chirico	3	3
(Slovakia) Viktória Kužmová	6	6
PR	(Czech Republic) Barbora Štefková	3	3
(Netherlands) Arantxa Rus	6	6
WC	(New Zealand) Joanna Carswell	1	0
(United States) Asia Muhammad	3	4
5	(Japan) Risa Ozaki	6	6

Second round
4	(United Kingdom) Naomi Broady	2	4
(Slovakia) Viktória Kužmová	6	6
(Netherlands) Arantxa Rus	6	2	6
5	(Japan) Risa Ozaki	3	6	1

Qualifying competition
(Slovakia) Viktória Kužmová	6	1	6
(Netherlands) Arantxa Rus	4	6	2
