= 2019 ASB Classic =

Coordinates: 36.853742°S 174.773507°E

- Date: 31 December 2018 – 6 January 2019 (women); 7–12 January 2019 (men)
- Edition: 34th (women); 43rd (men)
- Category: WTA International; ATP 250
- Draw: 32S / 16D (women); 28S / 16D (men)
- Prize money: $250,000 (women) $450,110 (men)
- Surface: Hard
- Location: Auckland, New Zealand
- Venue: ASB Tennis Centre

Champions

Men's singles
- (United States) Tennys Sandgren

Women's singles
- (Germany) Julia Görges

Men's doubles
- (Japan) Ben McLachlan / (Germany) Jan-Lennard Struff

Women's doubles
- (Canada) Eugenie Bouchard / (United States) Sofia Kenin
← 2018 ·	Auckland Open	· 2020 →

The 2019 Auckland Open (sponsored by ASB Bank) was a joint ATP and WTA tennis tournament, played on outdoor hard courts. It was the 34th edition of the women's event, and the 43rd edition of the men's event. It took place at the ASB Tennis Centre in Auckland, New Zealand, from 31 December 2018 to 6 January 2019 for the women, and from 7 to 12 January 2019 for the men.

== Finals ==
=== Men's singles ===
- (United States) Tennys Sandgren defeated (United Kingdom) Cameron Norrie, 6–4, 6–2

=== Women's singles ===
- (Germany) Julia Görges defeated (Canada) Bianca Andreescu 2–6, 7–5, 6–1

=== Men's doubles ===
- (Japan) Ben McLachlan / (Germany) Jan-Lennard Struff defeated (South Africa) Raven Klaasen / (New Zealand) Michael Venus, 6–3, 6–4

=== Women's doubles ===
- (Canada) Eugenie Bouchard / (United States) Sofia Kenin defeated (New Zealand) Paige Mary Hourigan / (United States) Taylor Townsend, 1–6, 6–1, [10–7]

== Points and prize money ==
=== Point distribution ===
Event	W	F	SF	QF	Round of 16	Round of 32	Q	Q3	Q2	Q1
Men's singles	250	150	90	45	20	0	12	6	0	—
Men's doubles	250	150	90	45	0	—	—	—	—	—
Women's singles	280	180	110	60	30	1	18	14	10	1
Women's doubles	280	180	110	60	1	—	—	—	—	—

=== Prize money ===
Event	W	F	SF	QF	Round of 16	Round of 32^{1}	Q3	Q2	Q1
Men's singles	$89,435	$47,105	$25,515	$14,535	$8,565	$5,075	$2,285	$1,145	—
Men's doubles *	$27,170	$14,280	$7,740	$4,430	$2,590	—	—	—	—
Women's singles	$43,000	$21,400	$11,300	$5,900	$3,310	$1,925	$1,005	$730	$530
Women's doubles *	$12,300	$6,400	$3,435	$1,820	$960	—	—	—	—

_{^{1} Qualifiers' prize money is also the Round of 32 prize money}
_{* per team}

== ATP singles main-draw entrants ==
=== Seeds ===
Country	Player	Rank^{1}	Seed
USA	John Isner	10	1
ITA	Fabio Fognini	13	2
ITA	Marco Cecchinato	20	3
ESP	Pablo Carreño Busta	23	4
~~ESP~~	~~Roberto Bautista Agut~~	~~24~~	~~5~~
KOR	Chung Hyeon	25	6
CAN	Denis Shapovalov	27	7
~~FRA~~	~~Gaël Monfils~~	~~29~~	~~8~~
USA	Steve Johnson	33	9

- ^{1} Rankings as of December 31, 2018.

=== Other entrants ===
The following players received wildcards into the singles main draw:

- (Spain) David Ferrer
- (United Kingdom) Cameron Norrie
- (New Zealand) Rubin Statham

The following players received entry from the qualifying draw:

- (France) Ugo Humbert
- (United States) Bradley Klahn
- (Germany) Maximilian Marterer
- (United States) Mackenzie McDonald

The following players received entry as lucky losers:

- (Uruguay) Pablo Cuevas
- (Serbia) Laslo Đere

=== Withdrawals ===
Before the tournament

- (Spain) Roberto Bautista Agut → replaced by (Serbia) Laslo Đere
- (France) Pierre-Hugues Herbert → replaced by (United States) Tennys Sandgren
- (France) Gaël Monfils → replaced by (Uruguay) Pablo Cuevas

=== Retirements ===
- (Serbia) Laslo Đere
- (Spain) David Ferrer

== ATP doubles main-draw entrants ==
=== Seeds ===
Country	Player	Country	Player	Rank^{1}	Seed
AUT	Oliver Marach	CRO	Mate Pavić	7	1
USA	Bob Bryan	USA	Mike Bryan	15	2
RSA	Raven Klaasen	NZL	Michael Venus	31	3
POL	Łukasz Kubot	ARG	Horacio Zeballos	38	4

- ^{1} Rankings as of December 31, 2018.

=== Other entrants ===
The following pairs received wildcards into the doubles main draw:

- (United Kingdom) Cameron Norrie / (New Zealand) Rubin Statham
- (New Zealand) Ajeet Rai / (New Zealand) George Stoupe

The following pair received entry as alternates:

- (Austria) Philipp Oswald / (Germany) Tim Pütz

=== Withdrawals ===
Before the tournament

- (Uruguay) Pablo Cuevas

== WTA singles main-draw entrants ==
=== Seeds ===
Country	Player	Rank^{1}	Seed
DEN	Caroline Wozniacki	3	1
GER	Julia Görges	14	2
TPE	Hsieh Su-wei	28	3
CRO	Petra Martić	32	4
CZE	Barbora Strýcová	33	5
USA	Venus Williams	38	6
BEL	Kirsten Flipkens	47	7
BEL	Alison Van Uytvanck	49	8

- ^{1} Rankings as of December 24, 2018

=== Other entrants ===
The following players received wildcards into the singles main draw:

- (United States) Amanda Anisimova
- (United States) Lauren Davis
- (United States) Bethanie Mattek-Sands

The following players received entry from the qualifying draw:

- (Canada) Bianca Andreescu
- (Slovakia) Jana Čepelová
- (Netherlands) Bibiane Schoofs
- (Spain) Sílvia Soler Espinosa

The following player received entry as a lucky loser:

- (Germany) Laura Siegemund

=== Withdrawals ===
Before the tournament

- (Sweden) Rebecca Peterson → replaced by (United States) Taylor Townsend
- (Czech Republic) Markéta Vondroušová → replaced by (Germany) Laura Siegemund

=== Retirements ===
- (Slovakia) Jana Čepelová (right thoracic injury)
- (Belgium) Alison Van Uytvanck (left ankle injury)

== WTA doubles main-draw entrants ==
=== Seeds ===
Country	Player	Country	Player	Rank^{1}	Seed
ROU	Raluca Olaru	USA	Abigail Spears	73	1
BEL	Kirsten Flipkens	SWE	Johanna Larsson	74	2
USA	Kaitlyn Christian	USA	Asia Muhammad	114	3
CHN	Han Xinyun	CRO	Darija Jurak	120	4

- ^{1} Rankings as of December 24, 2018

=== Other entrants ===
The following pairs received wildcards into the doubles main draw:

- (New Zealand) Paige Mary Hourigan / (United States) Taylor Townsend
- (New Zealand) Valentina Ivanov / (New Zealand) Elys Ventura

=== Withdrawals ===
During the tournament

- (Germany) Laura Siegemund (lower leg soreness)
