= 2018 ASB Classic – Men's doubles =

Men's doubles
- 2018 ASB Classic

Final
- Champions: (Austria) Oliver Marach (Croatia) Mate Pavić
- Runners-up: (Belarus) Max Mirnyi (Austria) Philipp Oswald
- Score: 6–4, 5–7, [10–7]

Details
- Draw: 16
- Seeds: 4

Events
Singles	men	women
Doubles	men	women
← 2017 ·	ATP Auckland Open	· 2019 →

Marcin Matkowski and Aisam-ul-Haq Qureshi were the defending champions, but lost in the quarterfinals to Raven Klaasen and Michael Venus.

Oliver Marach and Mate Pavić won the title, defeating Max Mirnyi and Philipp Oswald in the final, 6–4, 5–7, [10–7].

== Seeds ==
1. (Austria) Oliver Marach / (Croatia) Mate Pavić (champions)
2. (South Africa) Raven Klaasen / (New Zealand) Michael Venus (semifinals)
3. (Mexico) Santiago González / (Chile) Julio Peralta (semifinals)
4. (Uruguay) Pablo Cuevas / (Argentina) Horacio Zeballos (quarterfinals, withdrew)

== Draw ==
=== Key ===
- Q = Qualifier
- WC = Wild card
- LL = Lucky loser
- Alt = Alternate
- SE = Special exempt
- PR = Protected ranking
- ITF = ITF entry
- JE = Junior exempt
- w/o = Walkover
- r = Retired
- d = Defaulted
- SR = Special ranking

=== Draw ===
First round
1	(Austria) O Marach (Croatia) M Pavić	6	6^{6}	[10]
(Argentina) G Durán (Argentina) A Molteni	4	7^{8}	[6]
(Canada) D Nestor (United States) D Young	6	3	[10]
(Netherlands) R Haase (Netherlands) M Middelkoop	3	6	[5]
3	(Mexico) S González (Chile) J Peralta	6	6
(Brazil) M Demoliner (Philippines) T Huey	3	4
(Sweden) R Lindstedt (Croatia) F Škugor	6	6
Alt	(Moldova) R Albot (United States) T Sandgren	4	1
(Belarus) M Mirnyi (Austria) P Oswald	6	3	[10]
(New Zealand) M Daniell (United Kingdom) D Inglot	3	6	[8]
WC	(United States) J Sock (United States) J Withrow	7^{8}	6^{4}	[8]
4	(Uruguay) P Cuevas (Argentina) H Zeballos	6^{6}	7^{7}	[10]
(Poland) M Matkowski (Pakistan) A-u-H Qureshi	6^{4}	7^{10}	[10]
WC	(India) L Paes (India) P Raja	7^{7}	6^{8}	[7]
(Netherlands) W Koolhof (New Zealand) A Sitak	1	7^{7}	[7]
2	(South Africa) R Klaasen (New Zealand) M Venus	6	6^{2}	[10]

Quarterfinals
1	(Austria) O Marach (Croatia) M Pavić	7^{7}	6
(Canada) D Nestor (United States) D Young	6^{3}	3
3	(Mexico) S González (Chile) J Peralta	6	7^{7}
(Sweden) R Lindstedt (Croatia) F Škugor	1	6^{4}
(Belarus) M Mirnyi (Austria) P Oswald	w/o
4	(Uruguay) P Cuevas (Argentina) H Zeballos
(Poland) M Matkowski (Pakistan) A-u-H Qureshi	6	4	[4]
2	(South Africa) R Klaasen (New Zealand) M Venus	4	6	[10]

Semifinals
1	(Austria) O Marach (Croatia) M Pavić	6	4	[10]
3	(Mexico) S González (Chile) J Peralta	4	6	[6]
(Belarus) M Mirnyi (Austria) P Oswald	7^{9}	7^{8}
2	(South Africa) R Klaasen (New Zealand) M Venus	6^{7}	6^{6}

Final
1	(Austria) O Marach (Croatia) M Pavić	6	5	[10]
(Belarus) M Mirnyi (Austria) P Oswald	4	7	[7]
