= 2018 ASB Classic – Women's doubles =

Women's doubles
- 2018 ASB Classic

Final
- Champions: (Italy) Sara Errani (Netherlands) Bibiane Schoofs
- Runners-up: (Japan) Eri Hozumi (Japan) Miyu Kato
- Score: 7–5, 6–1

Details
- Draw: 16
- Seeds: 4

Events
Singles	men	women
Doubles	men	women
← 2017 ·	WTA Auckland Open	· 2019 →

Kiki Bertens and Johanna Larsson were the defending champions, but Bertens chose to compete in Brisbane instead and Larsson chose not to participate this year.

Sara Errani and Bibiane Schoofs won the title, defeating Eri Hozumi and Miyu Kato in the final, 7–5, 6–1.

== Seeds ==
1. (Japan) Eri Hozumi / (Japan) Miyu Kato (final)
2. (Japan) Nao Hibino / (Croatia) Darija Jurak (semifinals)
3. (United Kingdom) Naomi Broady / (Argentina) María Irigoyen (first round)
4. (Australia) Arina Rodionova / (Belgium) Maryna Zanevska (quarterfinals)

== Draw ==
=== Key ===
- Q = Qualifier
- WC = Wild card
- LL = Lucky loser
- Alt = Alternate
- SE = Special exempt
- PR = Protected ranking
- ITF = ITF entry
- JE = Junior exempt
- w/o = Walkover
- r = Retired
- d = Defaulted
- SR = Special ranking

=== Draw ===
First round
1	(Japan) E Hozumi (Japan) M Kato	6	6
(United States) L Davis (United States) C McHale	4	2
(United States) K Christian (United States) S Kenin	1	1
(Belgium) Y Bonaventure (Switzerland) V Golubic	6	6
3	(United Kingdom) N Broady (Argentina) M Irigoyen	4	3
(United States) M Brengle (United States) N Melichar	6	6
(Netherlands) A Rus (Spain) S Soler Espinosa	6	2	[10]
WC	(New Zealand) PM Hourigan (New Zealand) E Routliffe	2	6	[5]
(United States) A Muhammad (Czech Republic) B Štefková	4	2
(Italy) S Errani (Netherlands) B Schoofs	6	6
(Croatia) T Mrdeža (Switzerland) C Perrin	1	3
4	(Australia) Ar Rodionova (Belgium) M Zanevska	6	6
(Poland) M Fręch (India) P Thombare	5	6	[10]
(Germany) M Barthel (Croatia) D Vekić	7	3	[8]
WC	(Chinese Taipei) S-y Hsieh (New Zealand) J Lewis	1	0
2	(Japan) N Hibino (Croatia) D Jurak	6	6

Quarterfinals
1	(Japan) E Hozumi (Japan) M Kato	6	6
(Belgium) Y Bonaventure (Switzerland) V Golubic	3	3
(United States) M Brengle (United States) N Melichar	7	6
(Netherlands) A Rus (Spain) S Soler Espinosa	5	3
(Italy) S Errani (Netherlands) B Schoofs	6	7^{7}
4	(Australia) Ar Rodionova (Belgium) M Zanevska	4	6^{1}
(Poland) M Fręch (India) P Thombare	6	6^{3}	[3]
2	(Japan) N Hibino (Croatia) D Jurak	4	7^{7}	[10]

Semifinals
1	(Japan) E Hozumi (Japan) M Kato	6	6
(United States) M Brengle (United States) N Melichar	3	3
(Italy) S Errani (Netherlands) B Schoofs	6	6
2	(Japan) N Hibino (Croatia) D Jurak	4	3

Final
1	(Japan) E Hozumi (Japan) M Kato	5	1
(Italy) S Errani (Netherlands) B Schoofs	7	6
