= 2019 ASB Classic – Women's singles =

Women's singles
- 2019 ASB Classic

Final
- Champion: (Germany) Julia Görges
- Runner-up: (Canada) Bianca Andreescu
- Score: 2–6, 7–5, 6–1

Details
- Draw: 32 (4 Q / 4 WC )
- Seeds: 8

Events
Singles	men	women
Doubles	men	women
- WTA Auckland Open

Julia Görges successfully defended her title, defeating Bianca Andreescu in the final, 2–6, 7–5, 6–1.

This was the first time since 2006 that no New Zealand player was in the main draw, with all three wildcards being given to Americans.

== Seeds ==
1. (Denmark) Caroline Wozniacki (second round)
2. (Germany) Julia Görges (champion)
3. (Chinese Taipei) Hsieh Su-wei (semifinals)
4. (Croatia) Petra Martić (first round)
5. (Czech Republic) Barbora Strýcová (second round)
6. (United States) Venus Williams (quarterfinals)
7. (Belgium) Kirsten Flipkens (second round)
8. (Belgium) Alison Van Uytvanck (first round, retired)

== Draw ==
=== Finals ===
Semifinals
Q	(Canada) Bianca Andreescu	6	6
3	(Chinese Taipei) Hsieh Su-wei	3	3
(Slovakia) Viktória Kužmová	1	6^{6}
2	(Germany) Julia Görges	6	7^{8}

Final
Q	(Canada) Bianca Andreescu	6	5	1
2	(Germany) Julia Görges	2	7	6

=== Top half ===
First round
1	(Denmark) C Wozniacki	6	6
LL	(Germany) L Siegemund	3	2
(Hungary) T Babos	4	6^{6}
Q	(Canada) B Andreescu	6	7^{8}
WC	(United States) L Davis	6	6
(Spain) L Arruabarrena	2	2
(Belarus) V Azarenka	3	6	3
6	(United States) V Williams	6	1	6
3	(Chinese Taipei) S-w Hsieh	6	6
(Slovenia) P Hercog	2	3
(Puerto Rico) M Puig	6	6
WC	(United States) B Mattek-Sands	3	2
(Spain) S Sorribes Tormo	7	6
(Switzerland) S Vögele	5	3
(United States) S Vickery	2	2
7	(Belgium) K Flipkens	6	6

Second round
1	(Denmark) C Wozniacki	4	4
Q	(Canada) B Andreescu	6	6
WC	(United States) L Davis	4	3
6	(United States) V Williams	6	6
3	(Chinese Taipei) S-w Hsieh	6	7^{7}
(Puerto Rico) M Puig	1	6^{3}
(Spain) S Sorribes Tormo	6	1	6
7	(Belgium) K Flipkens	4	6	1

Quarterfinals
Q	(Canada) B Andreescu	6^{1}	6	6
6	(United States) V Williams	7^{7}	1	3
3	(Chinese Taipei) S-w Hsieh	6	6
(Spain) S Sorribes Tormo	3	2

Semifinals
Q	(Canada) B Andreescu	6	6
3	(Chinese Taipei) S-w Hsieh	3	3

=== Bottom half ===
First round
5	(Czech Republic) B Strýcová	6	6^{5}	6
(United States) T Townsend	2	7^{7}	3
WC	(United States) A Anisimova	6	3
Q	(Slovakia) J Čepelová	2	0^{r}
(Slovakia) V Kužmová	6	7^{7}
(Slovenia) T Zidanšek	2	6^{3}
(United States) S Kenin	7	2	6
4	(Croatia) P Martić	5	6	2
8	(Belgium) A Van Uytvanck	4^{r}
Q	(Netherlands) B Schoofs	3
(Canada) E Bouchard	6	6
(United States) M Brengle	3	3
(Germany) M Barthel	6	7^{7}
Q	(Spain) S Soler Espinosa	2	6^{1}
(Sweden) J Larsson	0	4
2	(Germany) J Görges	6	6

Second round
5	(Czech Republic) B Strýcová	3	3
WC	(United States) A Anisimova	6	6
(Slovakia) V Kužmová	7	5	6
(United States) S Kenin	5	7	3
Q	(Netherlands) B Schoofs	7^{7}	4	4
(Canada) E Bouchard	6^{5}	6	6
(Germany) M Barthel	4	4
2	(Germany) J Görges	6	6

Quarterfinals
WC	(United States) A Anisimova	3	6	4
(Slovakia) V Kužmová	6	2	6
(Canada) E Bouchard	6	3	6^{6}
2	(Germany) J Görges	3	6	7^{8}

Semifinals
(Slovakia) V Kužmová	1	6^{6}
2	(Germany) J Görges	6	7^{8}

== Qualifying ==
=== Seeds ===
1. (Germany) Laura Siegemund (qualifying competition, lucky loser)
2. (United States) Claire Liu (second round)
3. (Belgium) Ysaline Bonaventure (second round)
4. (Switzerland) Jil Teichmann (first round)
5. (Canada) Bianca Andreescu (qualified)
6. (China) Han Xinyun (first round)
7. (Australia) Arina Rodionova (first round)
8. (United States) Danielle Lao (qualifying competition)

=== Qualifiers ===
1. (Canada) Bianca Andreescu
2. (Slovakia) Jana Čepelová
3. (Netherlands) Bibiane Schoofs
4. (Spain) Sílvia Soler Espinosa

=== Lucky loser ===
1. (Germany) Laura Siegemund

=== Qualifying draw ===
==== First qualifier ====
First round
1	(Germany) Laura Siegemund	6	6
(United States) Sabrina Santamaria	3	4
(Australia) Ellen Perez	6	6
(Chile) Alexa Guarachi	2	4
(Russia) Varvara Flink	6^{3}	3
(Australia) Jaimee Fourlis	7^{7}	6
(Slovakia) Kristína Kučová	2	0
5	(Canada) Bianca Andreescu	6	6

Second round
1	(Germany) Laura Siegemund	4	6	6
(Australia) Ellen Perez	6	4	0
(Australia) Jaimee Fourlis	5	1
5	(Canada) Bianca Andreescu	7	6

Qualifying competition
1	(Germany) Laura Siegemund	6	3	3
5	(Canada) Bianca Andreescu	3	6	6

==== Second qualifier ====
First round
2	(United States) Claire Liu	6	6
(Germany) Anna Zaja	2	2
WC	(New Zealand) Elys Ventura	2	2
(Poland) Iga Świątek	6	6
(United States) Jamie Loeb	6	6
(United States) Abigail Spears	4	1
(Slovakia) Jana Čepelová	6	6
6	(China) Han Xinyun	2	3

Second round
2	(United States) Claire Liu	6	5	2
(Poland) Iga Świątek	3	7	6
(United States) Jamie Loeb	3	5
(Slovakia) Jana Čepelová	6	7

Qualifying competition
(Poland) Iga Świątek	2	6	4
(Slovakia) Jana Čepelová	6	4	6

==== Third qualifier ====
First round
3	(Belgium) Ysaline Bonaventure	6	4	6
(Canada) Katherine Sebov	4	6	3
(Brazil) Beatriz Haddad Maia	3	6	6
(Slovenia) Kaja Juvan	6	4	2
WC	(New Zealand) Valentina Ivanov	4	6	6
WC	(New Zealand) Paige Mary Hourigan	6	3	3
(Netherlands) Bibiane Schoofs	6	6
7	(Australia) Arina Rodionova	3	3

Second round
3	(Belgium) Ysaline Bonaventure	5	6	6^{5}
(Brazil) Beatriz Haddad Maia	7	4	7^{7}
WC	(New Zealand) Valentina Ivanov	4	0
(Netherlands) Bibiane Schoofs	6	6

Qualifying competition
(Brazil) Beatriz Haddad Maia	6^{6}	2
(Netherlands) Bibiane Schoofs	7^{8}	6

==== Fourth qualifier ====
First round
4	(Switzerland) Jil Teichmann	4	3
(Spain) Sílvia Soler Espinosa	6	6
(Russia) Alexandra Panova	6	6
WC	(New Zealand) Erin Routliffe	2	3
(United States) Asia Muhammad	6	1	6
(Netherlands) Lesley Kerkhove	2	6	2
(Australia) Astra Sharma	3	6	6^{7}
8	(United States) Danielle Lao	6	3	7^{9}

Second round
(Spain) Sílvia Soler Espinosa	2	6	7
(Russia) Alexandra Panova	6	4	5
(United States) Asia Muhammad	7	1	6^{1}
8	(United States) Danielle Lao	5	6	7^{7}

Qualifying competition
(Spain) Sílvia Soler Espinosa	3	7	6
8	(United States) Danielle Lao	6	5	3
