= George Stoupe =

New Zealand tennis player

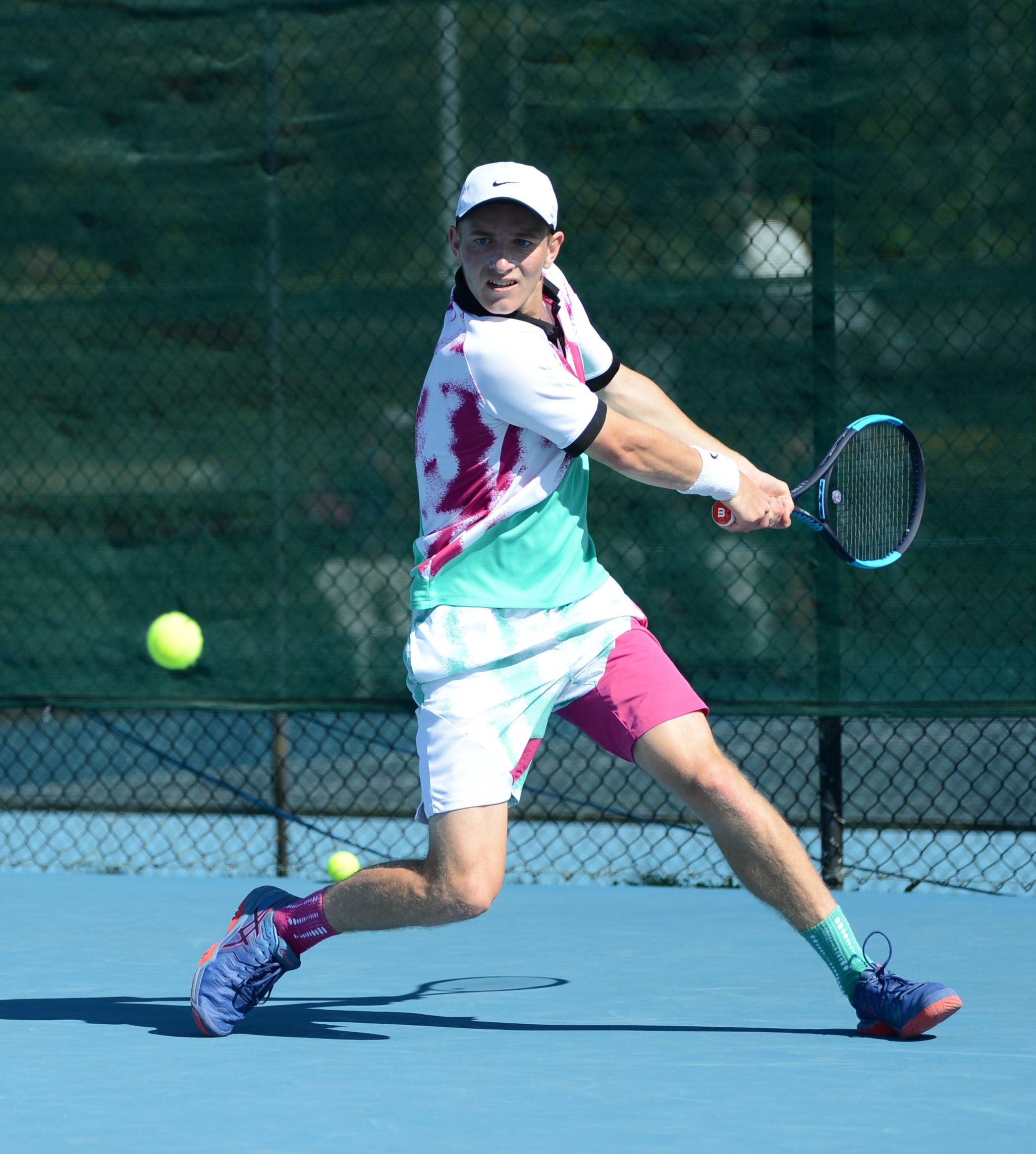
- Stoupe competing in the 18U New Zealand Tennis Nationals in 2018
- Country (sports): New Zealand
- Born: 15 June 2001 (age 23); Lower Hutt, New Zealand
- Height: 1.79 m (5 ft 10 1/2 in)
- Prize money: $1,390

Singles
- Career record: 0–0 (at ATP Tour level, Grand Slam level, and in Davis Cup)
- Career titles: 0
- Highest ranking: No. 1384 (4 December 2023)
- Current ranking: No. 1385 (18 December 2023)

Doubles
- Career record: 0–1 (at ATP Tour level, Grand Slam level, and in Davis Cup)
- Career titles: 0
- Highest ranking: No. 1351 (16 January 2023)
- Current ranking: No. 1476 (18 December 2023)
- Last updated on: 18 December 2023.

George Stoupe (born 15 June 2001) is a New Zealand tennis player.

Stoupe has a career high ITF junior combined ranking of 219 achieved on 15 April 2019. He is considered as one of the next top players from New Zealand following the retirement of Marina Erakovic.

Stoupe made his ATP main draw debut at the 2019 ASB Classic in the doubles draw partnering Ajeet Rai.

== ATP Challenger and ITF World Tennis Tour finals ==
=== Singles: 0 (0–0) ===
Legend ATP Challenger (0–0) ITF World Tennis Tour (0–0)	Finals by surface Hard (0–0) Clay (0–0) Grass (0–0) Carpet (0–0)

=== Doubles 2 (0–2) ===
Legend (doubles) ATP Challenger Tour (0–0) ITF World Tennis Tour (0–2)	Titles by surface Hard (0–2) Clay (0–0) Grass (0–0) Carpet (0–0)

Result	W–L	Date	Tournament	Tier	Surface	Partner	Opponents	Score
Loss	0–1	Dec 2022	M15 Tauranga, New Zealand	World Tennis Tour	Hard	(New Zealand) Reece Falck	(New Zealand) Jack Loutit (Japan) Daisuke Sumizawa	4–6, 5–7
Loss	0–2	Dec 2023	M15 Papamoa, New Zealand	World Tennis Tour	Hard	(New Zealand) Reece Falck	(New Zealand) Marcus Daniell (New Zealand) Finn Reynolds	5–7, 4–6
