= 2019 ASB Classic – Men's singles =

Men's singles
- 2019 ASB Classic

Final
- Champion: (United States) Tennys Sandgren
- Runner-up: (United Kingdom) Cameron Norrie
- Score: 6–4, 6–2

Details
- Draw: 28 (4 Q / 3 WC )
- Seeds: 8

Events
| Singles | men | women |
| Doubles | men | women |
- ATP Auckland Open

Roberto Bautista Agut was the defending champion, but withdrew before the tournament began.

Tennys Sandgren won his first title on the ATP Tour, defeating Cameron Norrie in the final, 6–4, 6–2.

== Seeds ==
The top four seeds received a bye into the second round.

1. (United States) John Isner (second round)
2. (Italy) Fabio Fognini (quarterfinals)
3. (Italy) Marco Cecchinato (second round)
4. (Spain) Pablo Carreño Busta (quarterfinals)
5. (Spain) Roberto Bautista Agut (withdrew)
6. (South Korea) Chung Hyeon (first round)
7. (Canada) Denis Shapovalov (first round)
8. (France) Gaël Monfils (withdrew)
9. (United States) Steve Johnson (first round)

== Draw ==
Key

- Q = Qualifier
- WC = Wild card
- LL = Lucky loser
- Alt = Alternate
- ITF = ITF entry
- PR = Protected ranking
- SR = Special ranking
- SE = Special exempt
- JE = Junior exempt
- JR = Junior Accelerator Programme entrant
- CO = College Accelerator Programme entrant
- NG = Next Gen Accelerator Program entrant
- w/o = Walkover
- r = Retired
- d = Defaulted

=== Finals ===
Semifinals
WC | (United Kingdom) Cameron Norrie | 7 | 4 | 6
(Germany) Jan-Lennard Struff | 5 | 6 | 3
(United States) Tennys Sandgren | 6 | 6
(Germany) Philipp Kohlschreiber | 4 | 2

Final
WC | (United Kingdom) Cameron Norrie | 4 | 2
(United States) Tennys Sandgren | 6 | 6

=== Top half ===
First round
(Romania) M Copil | 6 | 3 | 4
(United States) T Fritz | 4 | 6 | 6
WC | (United Kingdom) C Norrie | 6 | 6
(France) B Paire | 3 | 2
(Portugal) J Sousa | 4 | 6 | 6
7 | (Canada) D Shapovalov | 6 | 4 | 4
(Netherlands) R Haase | 2 | 1
WC | (Spain) D Ferrer | 6 | 6
(Germany) J-L Struff | 7^{7} | 2
LL | (Serbia) L Đere | 6^{5} | 0^{r}
WC | (New Zealand) R Statham | 7 | 6
6 | (South Korea) H Chung | 5 | 3

Second round
1 | (United States) J Isner | 6^{3} | 6^{5}
(United States) T Fritz | 7^{7} | 7^{7}
WC | (United Kingdom) C Norrie | 7^{7} | 6
(Portugal) J Sousa | 6^{5} | 4
4 | (Spain) P Carreño Busta | 1
WC | (Spain) D Ferrer | 1^{r}
(Germany) J-L Struff | 6 | 6
WC | (New Zealand) R Statham | 2 | 1

Quarterfinals
(United States) T Fritz | 6^{3} | 3
WC | (United Kingdom) C Norrie | 7^{7} | 6
4 | (Spain) P Carreño Busta | 6^{5} | 7^{8} | 6^{7}
(Germany) J-L Struff | 7^{7} | 6^{6} | 7^{9}

Semifinals
WC | (United Kingdom) C Norrie | 7 | 4 | 6
(Germany) J-L Struff | 5 | 6 | 3

=== Bottom half ===
First round
9 | (United States) S Johnson | 5 | 3
(Argentina) L Mayer | 7 | 6
Q | (United States) M McDonald | 3 | 4
(Italy) M Berrettini | 6 | 6
Q | (Germany) M Marterer | 3 | 4
(United States) T Sandgren | 6 | 6
LL | (Uruguay) P Cuevas | 5 | 1
Q | (France) U Humbert | 7 | 6
(Germany) P Kohlschreiber | 6 | 7^{7}
Q | (United States) B Klahn | 4 | 6^{2}
(Argentina) G Pella | 1 | 6 | 2
(Germany) P Gojowczyk | 6 | 3 | 6

Second round
(Argentina) L Mayer | 5 | 7^{7} | 6
(Italy) M Berrettini | 7 | 6^{5} | 3
(United States) T Sandgren | 6 | 6
3 | (Italy) M Cecchinato | 3 | 3
Q | (France) U Humbert | 4 | 4
(Germany) P Kohlschreiber | 6 | 6
(Germany) P Gojowczyk | 2 | 6 | 6^{5}
2 | (Italy) F Fognini | 6 | 3 | 7^{7}

Quarterfinals
(Argentina) L Mayer | 3 | 6^{5}
(United States) T Sandgren | 6 | 7^{7}
(Germany) P Kohlschreiber | 6 | 6
2 | (Italy) F Fognini | 3 | 1

Semifinals
(United States) T Sandgren | 6 | 6
(Germany) P Kohlschreiber | 4 | 2

== Qualifying ==
=== Seeds ===
1. (Spain) Albert Ramos Viñolas (withdrew, accepted into main draw in Sydney)
2. (Germany) Maximilian Marterer (qualified)
3. (United States) Bradley Klahn (qualified)
4. (United States) Mackenzie McDonald (qualified)
5. (Uruguay) Pablo Cuevas (qualifying competition, lucky loser)
6. (United Kingdom) Cameron Norrie (Received wildcard into main draw)
7. (Serbia) Laslo Đere (qualifying competition, lucky loser)
8. (Italy) Thomas Fabbiano (qualifying competition)

=== Qualifiers ===
1. (France) Ugo Humbert
2. (Germany) Maximilian Marterer
3. (United States) Bradley Klahn
4. (United States) Mackenzie McDonald

=== Lucky loser ===
1. (Serbia) Laslo Đere
2. (Uruguay) Pablo Cuevas

=== Qualifying draw ===
==== First qualifier ====
First round
Alt | (Croatia) Franko Škugor | 3 | 4
(France) Ugo Humbert | 6 | 6
WC | (New Zealand) Ajeet Rai | 6 | 6^{5} | 4
Alt | (Italy) Roberto Marcora | 3 | 7^{7} | 6

Qualifying competition
(France) Ugo Humbert | 6 | 7^{7}
Alt | (Italy) Roberto Marcora | 2 | 6^{3}

==== Second qualifier ====
First round
2 | (Germany) Maximilian Marterer | 7^{7} | 6
Alt | (Germany) Daniel Masur | 6^{2} | 1
WC | (New Zealand) Finn Tearney | 3 | 4
8 | (Italy) Thomas Fabbiano | 6 | 6

Qualifying competition
2 | (Germany) Maximilian Marterer | 6 | 6
8 | (Italy) Thomas Fabbiano | 4 | 4

==== Third qualifier ====
First round
3 | (United States) Bradley Klahn | 7^{7} | 6
Alt | (Austria) Philipp Oswald | 6^{2} | 4
(France) Stéphane Robert | 3 | 2
5 | (Uruguay) Pablo Cuevas | 6 | 6

Qualifying competition
3 | (United States) Bradley Klahn | 6^{4} | 7^{7} | 7^{7}
5 | (Uruguay) Pablo Cuevas | 7^{7} | 6^{3} | 6^{1}

==== Fourth qualifier ====
First round
4 | (United States) Mackenzie McDonald | 6 | 7^{7}
Alt | (Germany) Tim Pütz | 2 | 6^{5}
(Argentina) Horacio Zeballos | 5 | 2
7 | (Serbia) Laslo Đere | 7 | 6

Qualifying competition
4 | (United States) Mackenzie McDonald | 7 | 7^{7}
7 | (Serbia) Laslo Đere | 5 | 6^{3}
