= 2018 ASB Classic =

Coordinates: 36.853742°S 174.773507°E

- Date: 1–7 January (women); 8–13 January (men)
- Edition: 33rd (women); 42nd (men)
- Category: WTA International; ATP 250
- Draw: 32S / 16D (women); 28S / 16D (men)
- Prize money: $226,750 (women) $450,110 (men)
- Surface: Hard
- Location: Auckland, New Zealand
- Venue: ASB Tennis Centre

Champions

Men's singles
- (Spain) Roberto Bautista Agut

Women's singles
- (Germany) Julia Görges

Men's doubles
- (Austria) Oliver Marach / (Croatia) Mate Pavić

Women's doubles
- (Italy) Sara Errani / (Netherlands) Bibiane Schoofs
- Auckland Open

The 2018 Auckland Open (sponsored by ASB Bank) was a joint 2018 ATP World Tour and 2018 WTA Tour tennis tournament, played on outdoor hard courts. It was the 33rd edition of the women's event, and the 42nd edition of the men's event. It took place at the ASB Tennis Centre in Auckland, New Zealand, from 1 to 7 January 2018 for the women, and from 8 to 13 January 2018 for the men.

== Finals ==
=== Men's singles ===
- (Spain) Roberto Bautista Agut defeated (Argentina) Juan Martín del Potro, 6–1, 4–6, 7–5

=== Women's singles ===
- (Germany) Julia Görges defeated (Denmark) Caroline Wozniacki, 6–4, 7–6^{(7–4)}

=== Men's doubles ===
- (Austria) Oliver Marach / (Croatia) Mate Pavić defeated (Belarus) Max Mirnyi / (Austria) Philipp Oswald, 6–4, 5–7, [10–7]

=== Women's doubles ===
- (Italy) Sara Errani / (Netherlands) Bibiane Schoofs defeated (Japan) Eri Hozumi / (Japan) Miyu Kato, 7–5, 6–1

== Points and prize money ==
=== Point distribution ===
Event	W	F	SF	QF	Round of 16	Round of 32	Q	Q3	Q2	Q1
Men's singles	250	150	90	45	20	0	12	6	0	—N/a
Men's doubles	250	150	90	45	0	—N/a	—N/a	—N/a	—N/a	—N/a
Women's singles	280	180	110	60	30	1	18	14	10	1
Women's doubles	280	180	110	60	1	—N/a	—N/a	—N/a	—N/a	—N/a

=== Prize money ===
Event	W	F	SF	QF	Round of 16	Round of 32^{1}	Q3	Q2	Q1
Men's singles	$89,435	$47,105	$25,515	$14,535	$8,565	$5,075	$2,285	$1,145	—N/a
Men's doubles *	$27,170	$14,280	$7,740	$4,430	$2,590	—N/a	—N/a	—N/a	—N/a
Women's singles	$43,000	$21,400	$11,300	$5,900	$3,310	$1,925	$1,005	$730	$530
Women's doubles *	$12,300	$6,400	$3,435	$1,820	$960	—N/a	—N/a	—N/a	—N/a

_{^{1} Qualifiers' prize money is also the Round of 32 prize money}
_{* per team}

== ATP singles main-draw entrants ==
=== Seeds ===
Country	Player	Rank^{1}	Seed
USA	Jack Sock	8	1
ARG	Juan Martín del Potro	11	2
USA	Sam Querrey	13	3
USA	John Isner	17	4
ESP	Roberto Bautista Agut	20	5
URU	Pablo Cuevas	32	6
ESP	David Ferrer	37	7
~~RUS~~	~~Andrey Rublev~~	~~39~~	~~8~~

- ^{1} Rankings as of January 1, 2018.

=== Other entrants ===
The following players received wildcards into the singles main draw:

- (Greece) Stefanos Tsitsipas
- (New Zealand) Michael Venus
- (China) Wu Yibing

The following players received entry from the qualifying draw:

- (Moldova) Radu Albot
- (Brazil) Rogério Dutra Silva
- (Norway) Casper Ruud
- (United States) Tim Smyczek

The following players received entry as lucky losers:

- (Italy) Liam Caruana
- (Japan) Taro Daniel
- (Slovakia) Lukáš Lacko
- (United States) Tennys Sandgren

=== Withdrawals ===
Before the tournament

- (United Kingdom) Kyle Edmund → replaced by (United States) Tennys Sandgren
- (United States) Ryan Harrison → replaced by (Italy) Liam Caruana
- (Argentina) Guido Pella → replaced by (Japan) Taro Daniel
- (Russia) Andrey Rublev → replaced by (Slovakia) Lukáš Lacko

== ATP doubles main-draw entrants ==
=== Seeds ===
Country	Player	Country	Player	Rank^{1}	Seed
AUT	Oliver Marach	CRO	Mate Pavić	36	1
RSA	Raven Klaasen	NZL	Michael Venus	40	2
MEX	Santiago González	CHI	Julio Peralta	57	3
URU	Pablo Cuevas	ARG	Horacio Zeballos	59	4

- ^{1} Rankings as of January 1, 2018.

=== Other entrants ===
The following pairs received wildcards into the doubles main draw:

- (India) Leander Paes / (India) Purav Raja
- (United States) Jack Sock / (United States) Jackson Withrow

The following pair received entry as alternates:

- (Moldova) Radu Albot / (United States) Tennys Sandgren

=== Withdrawals ===
Before the tournament

- (Argentina) Guido Pella

During the tournament

- (Uruguay) Pablo Cuevas

== WTA singles main-draw entrants ==
=== Seeds ===
Country	Player	Rank^{1}	Seed
DEN	Caroline Wozniacki	3	1
GER	Julia Görges	14	2
CZE	Barbora Strýcová	23	3
POL	Agnieszka Radwańska	28	4
USA	Lauren Davis	48	5
KAZ	Yulia Putintseva	50	6
GER	Mona Barthel	52	7
CRO	Donna Vekić	54	8

- ^{1} Rankings as of December 25, 2017.

=== Other entrants ===
The following players received wildcards into the singles main draw:

- (Italy) Sara Errani
- (United States) Sofia Kenin
- (New Zealand) Jade Lewis

The following players received entry from the qualifying draw:

- (Belgium) Ysaline Bonaventure
- (Croatia) Jana Fett
- (Slovakia) Viktória Kužmová
- (United States) Sachia Vickery

== WTA doubles main-draw entrants ==
=== Seeds ===
Country	Player	Country	Player	Rank^{1}	Seed
JPN	Eri Hozumi	JPN	Miyu Kato	85	1
JPN	Nao Hibino	CRO	Darija Jurak	101	2
GBR	Naomi Broady	ARG	María Irigoyen	156	3
AUS	Arina Rodionova	BEL	Maryna Zanevska	175	4

- ^{1} Rankings as of December 25, 2017.

=== Other entrants ===
The following pairs received wildcards into the doubles main draw:

- (New Zealand) Paige Mary Hourigan / (New Zealand) Erin Routliffe
- (Chinese Taipei) Hsieh Shu-ying / (New Zealand) Jade Lewis
