= Elys Ventura =

New Zealand tennis player

- Full name: Elys Saguil-Ventura
- Country (sports): New Zealand
- Residence: North Shore, Auckland
- Born: 20 June 2001 (age 25) Manila, Philippines

Singles
- Career record: 0–0
- Career titles: 0

Doubles
- Career record: 0–1
- Career titles: 0
- Last updated on: 31 December 2018.

Elys Saguil-Ventura (born 20 June 2001) is a New Zealand tennis player.

Ventura has a career high ITF junior combined ranking of 396 achieved in April 2019.

Ventura made her WTA main draw debut at the 2019 ASB Classic in the doubles draw partnering Valentina Ivanov.
