= 2002 Brasil Open =

- Date: 9–15 September
- Edition: 2nd (men) / 4th (women)
- Surface: Hard / outdoor
- Location: Mata de São João, Brazil

Champions

Men's singles
- (Brazil) Gustavo Kuerten

Women's singles
- (Russia) Anastasia Myskina

Men's doubles
- (United States) Scott Humphries / (The Bahamas) Mark Merklein

Women's doubles
- (Spain) Virginia Ruano Pascual / (Argentina) Paola Suárez
- Brasil Open

The 2002 Brasil Open was a tennis tournament played on outdoor hard courts in Costa do Sauipe resort, Mata de São João, Brazil that was part of the International Series of the 2002 ATP Tour and of Tier II of the 2002 WTA Tour. The tournament ran from 9 September through 15 September 2002. Gustavo Kuerten and Anastasia Myskina won the singles titles.

== Finals ==
=== Men's singles ===
(Brazil) Gustavo Kuerten defeated (Argentina) Guillermo Coria 6–7^{(4–7)}, 7–5, 7–6^{(7–2)}

- It was Kuerten's only title of the year and the 25th of his career.

=== Women's singles ===
(Russia) Anastasia Myskina defeated (Greece) Eleni Daniilidou 6–3, 0–6, 6–2

- It was Myskina's only title of the year and the 2nd of her career.

=== Men's doubles ===
(United States) Scott Humphries / (The Bahamas) Mark Merklein defeated (Brazil) Gustavo Kuerten / (Brazil) André Sá 6–3, 7–6^{(7–1)}

- It was Humphries's only title of the year and the 3rd of his career. It was Merklein's only title of the year and the 2nd of his career.

=== Women's doubles ===
(Spain) Virginia Ruano Pascual / (Argentina) Paola Suárez defeated (France) Émilie Loit / (Paraguay) Rossana de los Ríos 6–4, 6–1

- It was Ruano Pascual's 7th title of the year and the 20th of her career. It was Suárez's 7th title of the year and the 27th of her career.
