= 2002 Brasil Open – Men's doubles =

Men's doubles
- 2002 Brasil Open

Final
- Champions: (United States) Scott Humphries (The Bahamas) Mark Merklein
- Runners-up: (Brazil) Gustavo Kuerten (Brazil) André Sá
- Score: 6–3, 7–6^{(7–1)}

Details
- Draw: 16
- Seeds: 4

Events
Singles	men	women
Doubles	men	women
← 2001 ·	Brasil Open	· 2003 →

Enzo Artoni and Daniel Melo were the defending champions but only Melo competed that year with Ricardo Schlachter.

Melo and Schlachter lost in the first round to Nathan Healey and Jordan Kerr.

Scott Humphries and Mark Merklein won in the final 6–3, 7–6^{(7–1)} against Gustavo Kuerten and André Sá.

== Seeds ==
1. (Austria) Julian Knowle / (Germany) Michael Kohlmann (semifinals)
2. (Slovakia) Dominik Hrbatý / (Netherlands) Sjeng Schalken (first round)
3. (Argentina) Martín García / (Argentina) Martín Rodríguez (first round)
4. (South Africa) Jeff Coetzee / (South Africa) Chris Haggard (first round)

== Draw ==
=== Key ===
- Q = Qualifier
- WC = Wild card
- LL = Lucky loser
- Alt = Alternate
- ITF = ITF entry
- PR = Protected ranking
- SR = Special ranking
- SE = Special exempt
- JE = Junior exempt
- JR = Junior Accelerator Programme entrant
- CO = College Accelerator Programme entrant
- NG = Next Gen Accelerator Program entrant
- w/o = Walkover
- r = Retired
- d = Defaulted

First round
1	(Austria) J Knowle (Germany) M Kohlmann	6	7
WC	(Brazil) M Daniel (Brazil) R Mello	1	5
(United States) D Bowen (Australia) A Fisher	6	5	6
(Australia) T Perry (United States) G Weiner	3	7	2
4	(South Africa) J Coetzee (South Africa) C Haggard	1	6	4
WC	(Brazil) F Saretta (Brazil) A Simoni	6	2	6
(United States) B Coupe (Japan) T Shimada	5	3
(United States) S Humphries (The Bahamas) M Merklein	7	6
(Brazil) D Melo (Brazil) R Schlachter	1	3
(Australia) N Healey (Australia) J Kerr	6	6
WC	(Brazil) G Kuerten (Brazil) A Sá	6	6
3	(Argentina) M García (Argentina) M Rodríguez	3	2
(Chile) N Massú (Argentina) M Zabaleta	5	4
(Argentina) G Etlis (Argentina) L Lobo	7	6
(Argentina) A Calleri (Spain) T Robredo	6	7^{7}
2	(Slovakia) D Hrbatý (Netherlands) S Schalken	4	6^{3}

Quarterfinals
1	(Austria) J Knowle (Germany) M Kohlmann	6	6
(United States) D Bowen (Australia) A Fisher	3	2
WC	(Brazil) F Saretta (Brazil) A Simoni	0	3
(United States) S Humphries (The Bahamas) M Merklein	6	6
(Australia) N Healey (Australia) J Kerr	3	3
WC	(Brazil) G Kuerten (Brazil) A Sá	6	6
(Argentina) G Etlis (Argentina) L Lobo	7^{10}	1	6
(Argentina) A Calleri (Spain) T Robredo	6^{8}	6	3

Semifinals
1	(Austria) J Knowle (Germany) M Kohlmann	5	7^{7}	6^{6}
(United States) S Humphries (The Bahamas) M Merklein	7	6^{4}	7^{8}
WC	(Brazil) G Kuerten (Brazil) A Sá	7^{7}	6
(Argentina) G Etlis (Argentina) L Lobo	6^{4}	1

Final
(United States) S Humphries (The Bahamas) M Merklein	6	7^{7}
WC	(Brazil) G Kuerten (Brazil) A Sá	3	6^{1}
