= 2002 Brasil Open – Men's singles =

Men's singles
- 2002 Brasil Open

Final
- Champion: (Brazil) Gustavo Kuerten
- Runner-up: (Argentina) Guillermo Coria
- Score: 6–7^{(4–7)}, 7–5, 7–6^{(7–2)}

Details
- Draw: 32
- Seeds: 8

Events
Singles	men	women
Doubles	men	women
- Brasil Open

Jan Vacek was the defending champion but did not compete that year.

Gustavo Kuerten won in the final 6–7^{(4–7)}, 7–5, 7–6^{(7–2)} against Guillermo Coria.

== Seeds ==
1. (Brazil) Fernando Meligeni (second round)
2. (Netherlands) Sjeng Schalken (second round)
3. (Spain) Tommy Robredo (first round)
4. (Argentina) Mariano Zabaleta (second round)
5. (Argentina) Agustín Calleri (quarterfinals)
6. (Brazil) Gustavo Kuerten (champion)
7. (Slovakia) Dominik Hrbatý (quarterfinals)
8. (Brazil) André Sá (quarterfinals)

== Draw ==
Key

- Q = Qualifier
- WC = Wild card
- LL = Lucky loser
- Alt = Alternate
- ITF = ITF entry
- PR = Protected ranking
- SR = Special ranking
- SE = Special exempt
- JE = Junior exempt
- JR = Junior Accelerator Programme entrant
- CO = College Accelerator Programme entrant
- NG = Next Gen Accelerator Program entrant
- w/o = Walkover
- r = Retired
- d = Defaulted

=== Finals ===
Semifinals
6	(Brazil) Gustavo Kuerten	6	6^{2}	6
(Paraguay) Ramón Delgado	4	7^{7}	3
(Argentina) Guillermo Coria	7	6
(United States) Cecil Mamiit	5	2

Final
6	(Brazil) Gustavo Kuerten	6^{4}	7	7^{7}
(Argentina) Guillermo Coria	7^{7}	5	6^{2}

=== Top half ===
First round
1	(Brazil) F Meligeni	4	6	4
(United States) A Kim	6	3	1^{r}
Q	(Argentina) G Etlis	2	6	6
(Chile) N Massú	6	4	4
Q	(United States) M Washington	6^{3}	6	6
Q	(Switzerland) I Heuberger	7^{7}	2	4
(Austria) J Knowle	4	2
6	(Brazil) G Kuerten	6	6
4	(Argentina) M Zabaleta	6	6
(Italy) S Galvani	4	4
(Paraguay) R Delgado	6	6
(France) J Golmard	3	2
WC	(Brazil) J Silva	4	6	3
(Switzerland) G Bastl	6	2	6
LL	(Peru) I Miranda	2	2
8	(Brazil) A Sá	6	6

Second round
1	(Brazil) F Meligeni	1	6^{3}
Q	(Argentina) G Etlis	6	7^{7}
Q	(United States) M Washington	0	5
6	(Brazil) G Kuerten	6	7
4	(Argentina) M Zabaleta	2	5
(Paraguay) R Delgado	6	7
(Switzerland) G Bastl	1	5
8	(Brazil) A Sá	6	7

Quarterfinals
Q	(Argentina) G Etlis	6^{5}	1
6	(Brazil) G Kuerten	7^{7}	6
(Paraguay) R Delgado	6	7
8	(Brazil) A Sá	4	5

Semifinals
6	(Brazil) G Kuerten	6	6^{2}	6
(Paraguay) R Delgado	4	7^{7}	3

=== Bottom half ===
First round
7	(Slovakia) D Hrbatý	7^{7}	6
Q	(Germany) M Abel	6^{4}	3
WC	(Brazil) R Mello	1	4
(United States) B Vahaly	6	6
(Argentina) G Coria	6	6
(Brazil) F Saretta	1	0
(Peru) L Horna	6	6
3	(Spain) T Robredo	1	3
5	(Argentina) A Calleri	3	6	6
(Brazil) A Simoni	6	3	3
(United States) V Spadea	4	6	7^{9}
(Croatia) M Ančić	6	1	6^{7}
(United States) C Mamiit	6	5	5
WC	(Brazil) D Melo	2	7	3^{r}
(Germany) M Kohlmann	2	6^{0}
2	(Netherlands) S Schalken	6	7^{7}

Second round
7	(Slovakia) D Hrbatý	4	6	6
(United States) B Vahaly	6	2	2
(Argentina) G Coria	6	6
(Peru) L Horna	4	1
5	(Argentina) A Calleri	7^{7}	7
(United States) V Spadea	6^{1}	5
(United States) C Mamiit	6	7^{8}
2	(Netherlands) S Schalken	3	6^{6}

Quarterfinals
7	(Slovakia) D Hrbatý	2	4
(Argentina) G Coria	6	6
5	(Argentina) A Calleri	6^{5}	4
(United States) C Mamiit	7^{7}	6

Semifinals
(Argentina) G Coria	7	6
(United States) C Mamiit	5	2
