= 2002 WTA Madrid Open =

- Date: 20 – 25 May 2002
- Edition: 7th
- Category: WTA Tier III
- Draw: 30S / 16D / 32Q
- Prize money: US$ 170,000
- Surface: Clay
- Location: Madrid, Spain

Champions

Singles
- (United States) Monica Seles

Doubles
- (United States) Martina Navratilova / (Belarus) Natasha Zvereva
← 2001 ·	WTA Madrid Open	· 2003 →

The 2002 WTA Madrid Open (also known as the Open de España Madrid 2012 or Trofeo Volkswagen for sponsorship reasons) was a professional women's tennis tournament played on outdoor clay courts in Madrid, Spain from 20 to 25 May 2002. It was the seventh edition of the event on the WTA Tour. It was classified as a Tier III event on the 2002 WTA Tour.

== Finals ==
=== Singles ===
- (United States) Monica Seles defeated (United States) Chanda Rubin, 6–4, 6–2.

It was the 2nd title in the season for Seles, and the 53rd and final title of her singles career.

=== Doubles ===
- (United States) Martina Navratilova / (Belarus) Natasha Zvereva defeated (Paraguay) Rossana de los Ríos / (Spain) Arantxa Sánchez Vicario, 6–2, 6–3.

It was the 166th title for Navratilova and the 80th title for Zvereva in their respective doubles careers.

== Points and prize money ==
=== Point distribution ===
Event	W	F	SF	QF	Round of 16	Round of 32	Q	Q3	Q2	Q1
Singles	120	85	55	30	16	1	7.25	3.75	2.25	1
Doubles	120	85	55	30	1	—				

=== Prize money ===
Event	W	F	SF	QF	Round of 16	Round of 32	Q	Q3	Q2	Q1
Singles	$27,000	$14,500	$7,500	$4,000	$2,200	$1,300	—	$650	$350	$200
Doubles	$8,000	$4,250	$2,250	$1,225	$650	—				

== Singles main draw entrants ==
=== Seeds ===
Country	Player	Rank^{1}	Seed
USA	Monica Seles	5	1
ESP	Arantxa Sánchez Vicario	17	2
THA	Tamarine Tanasugarn	19	3
SUI	Patty Schnyder	20	4
ISR	Anna Smashnova	21	5
CRO	Iva Majoli	31	6
JPN	Ai Sugiyama	33	7
ITA	Rita Grande	35	8

^{1}: Rankings are as of 13 May 2002.

=== Other entrants ===
The following players received wildcards into the main draw:

- (Croatia) Iva Majoli
- (Spain) Virginia Ruano Pascual
- (Spain) Arantxa Sánchez Vicario

The following players received entry from the qualifying draw:

- (Argentina) Clarisa Fernández
- (France) Alexandra Fusai
- (United States) Samantha Reeves
- (Russia) Dinara Safina

=== Retirements ===
- (Spain) Virginia Ruano Pascual

== Doubles main draw entrants ==
=== Seeds ===
Country	Player	Country	Player	Rank^{1}	Seed
ZIM	Cara Black	AUS	Nicole Pratt	37	1
PAR	Rossana de los Ríos	ESP	Arantxa Sánchez Vicario	123	2
RSA	Nannie de Villiers	ARG	Laura Montalvo	126	3
AUS	Alicia Molik	ESP	Magüi Serna	132	4

^{1}: Rankings are as of 13 May 2002.

=== Other entrants ===
The following pair received wildcards into the doubles main draw:

- (Spain) Gala León García / (Spain) Cristina Torrens Valero

The following pair received entry from the qualifying draw:

- (Argentina) Jorgelina Cravero / (Spain) Arantxa Parra Santonja

The following pair received entry as a lucky losers:

- (Australia) Jenny Belobrajdic / (Australia) Nicole Sewell

=== Withdrawals ===
Before the tournament

- (Spain) Eva Bes / (Spain) Marta Marrero → replaced by Jenny Belobrajdic / Nicole Sewell
