= 2002 WTA Brasil Open =

- Date: 9–14 September
- Edition: 4th
- Category: WTA Tier II tournaments
- Prize money: $650,000
- Location: Mata de São João, Bahia, Brazil

Champions

Singles
- (Russia) Anastasia Myskina

Doubles
- (Spain) Virginia Ruano Pascual / (Argentina) Paola Suárez
- WTA Brasil Open

The 2002 WTA Brasil Open was a WTA tennis tournament held in Bahia, Brazil from 9–14 September 2002, organised for women's professional tennis. It was a Tier 2 tournament and was part of the 2002 WTA Tour. The prize money was US$ 650,000.

Russian Anastasia Myskina won the singles and the Spanish-Argentine duo of Virginia Ruano Pascual and Paola Suárez won the doubles title.

== Finals ==
=== Singles ===
(Russia) Anastasia Myskina defeated (Greece) Eleni Daniilidou, 6-3, 0-6, 6–2

- It was Myskina's only title of the year and the 2nd of her career.

=== Doubles ===
(Spain) Virginia Ruano Pascual / (Argentina) Paola Suárez defeated (France) Émilie Loit / (Paraguay) Rossana de los Ríos 6–4, 6–1

- It was Ruano Pascual's 7th title of the year and the 20th of her career. It was Suárez's 7th title of the year and the 27th of her career.
