= 2002 WTA Madrid Open – Singles =

Singles
- 2002 WTA Madrid Open

Final
- Champion: (United States) Monica Seles
- Runner-up: (United States) Chanda Rubin
- Score: 6–4, 6–2

Details
- Draw: 30 (3WC/4Q)
- Seeds: 8

Events
Singles	Doubles
← 2001 ·	WTA Madrid Open	· 2003 →

Arantxa Sánchez Vicario was the defending champion, but lost in the second round to Chanda Rubin.

Monica Seles won the title by defeating Rubin 6–4, 6–2 in the final.

== Seeds ==
The first two seeds received a bye into the second round.

1. (United States) Monica Seles (champion)
2. (Spain) Arantxa Sánchez Vicario (second round)
3. (Thailand) Tamarine Tanasugarn (first round)
4. (Switzerland) Patty Schnyder (first round)
5. (Israel) Anna Smashnova (quarterfinals)
6. (Croatia) Iva Majoli (first round)
7. (Japan) Ai Sugiyama (first round)
8. (Italy) Rita Grande (second round)

== Draw ==
=== Key ===
- Q = Qualifier
- WC = Wild card
- LL = Lucky loser
- Alt = Alternate
- SE = Special exempt
- PR = Protected ranking
- ITF = ITF entry
- JE = Junior exempt
- w/o = Walkover
- r = Retired
- d = Defaulted
- SR = Special ranking

=== Finals ===
Semifinals
1	(United States) Monica Seles	4	6	6
(Argentina) Paola Suárez	6	1	3
(Colombia) Fabiola Zuluaga	4	2
(United States) Chanda Rubin	6	6

Final
1	(United States) Monica Seles	6	6
(United States) Chanda Rubin	4	2

=== Top half ===
First round
(Germany) B Lamade	7	3	2
(Spain) M Marrero	5	6	6
(Australia) A Molik	6	6
(United States) A Frazier	4	3
Q	(United States) S Reeves	6	5	3
5	(Israel) A Smashnova	1	7	6
4	(Switzerland) P Schnyder	4	4
(Argentina) P Suárez	6	6
(Spain) C Torrens Valero	3	7^{7}	0
Q	(Russia) D Safina	6	6^{5}	6
(United States) M Irvin	2
WC	(Spain) V Ruano Pascual	1^{r}
Q	(Argentina) C Fernández	7^{7}	7
7	(Japan) A Sugiyama	6^{4}	5

Second round
1	(United States) M Seles	7	6
(Spain) M Marrero	5	2
(Australia) A Molik	5	2
5	(Israel) A Smashnova	7	6
(Argentina) P Suárez	7	6
Q	(Russia) D Safina	5	1
(United States) M Irvin	4	6	0
Q	(Argentina) C Fernández	6	3	6

Quarterfinals
1	(United States) M Seles	6	6
5	(Israel) A Smashnova	3	2
(Argentina) P Suárez	6	7
Q	(Argentina) C Fernández	4	5

Semifinals
1	(United States) M Seles	4	6	6
(Argentina) P Suárez	6	1	3

=== Bottom half ===
First round
8	(Italy) R Grande	6	1	6
(Spain) Á Montolio	1	6	1
(Canada) V Webb	4	3
(Colombia) F Zuluaga	6	6
(France) É Loit	4	6	6
(Spain) G León García	6	1	2
(Zimbabwe) C Black	6	6
3	(Thailand) T Tanasugarn	3	3
6/WC	(Croatia) I Majoli	6	1	4
(Spain) M Serna	4	6	6
(Australia) N Pratt	7	6
Q	(France) A Fusai	5	2
(United States) C Rubin	6	7^{7}
(Paraguay) R de los Ríos	2	6^{5}

Second round
8	(Italy) R Grande	5	5
(Colombia) F Zuluaga	7	7
(France) É Loit	6	6
(Zimbabwe) C Black	4	4
(Spain) M Serna	6	6
(Australia) N Pratt	2	2
(United States) C Rubin	6	7^{8}
2/WC	(Spain) A Sánchez Vicario	3	6^{6}

Quarterfinals
(Colombia) F Zuluaga	4	6	7
(France) É Loit	6	0	5
(Spain) M Serna	3	3
(United States) C Rubin	6	6

Semifinals
(Colombia) F Zuluaga	4	2
(United States) C Rubin	6	6
