= 2003 Brasil Open – Doubles =

Doubles
- 2003 Brasil Open

Final
- Champions: (Australia) Todd Perry (Japan) Thomas Shimada
- Runners-up: (United States) Scott Humphries (The Bahamas) Mark Merklein
- Score: 6–2, 6–4

Details
- Draw: 16
- Seeds: 4

Events
| Singles | Doubles |
| ← 2002 · | Brasil Open | · 2004 → |

Scott Humphries and Mark Merklein were the defending champions but lost in the final 6–2, 6–4 against Todd Perry and Thomas Shimada.

== Seeds ==
1. (Argentina) Gastón Etlis / (Brazil) André Sá (first round)
2. (United States) Scott Humphries / (The Bahamas) Mark Merklein (final)
3. (Australia) Nathan Healey / (Australia) Jordan Kerr (first round)
4. (Argentina) Martín García / (United States) Graydon Oliver (semifinals)

== Draw ==
=== Key ===
- Q = Qualifier
- WC = Wild card
- LL = Lucky loser
- Alt = Alternate
- ITF = ITF entry
- PR = Protected ranking
- SR = Special ranking
- SE = Special exempt
- JE = Junior exempt
- JR = Junior Accelerator Programme entrant
- CO = College Accelerator Programme entrant
- NG = Next Gen Accelerator Program entrant
- w/o = Walkover
- r = Retired
- d = Defaulted

First round
1 | (Argentina) G Etlis (Brazil) A Sá | 3 | 6 | 4
WC | (Brazil) J Goffi (Brazil) R Mello | 6 | 2 | 6
(Argentina) F Browne (France) G Carraz | 3 | 4
(Australia) T Perry (Japan) T Shimada | 6 | 6
3 | (Australia) N Healey (Australia) J Kerr | 4 | 2
(Argentina) J I Chela (Brazil) F Saretta | 6 | 6
ALT | (Paraguay) R Delgado (Peru) I Miranda | 5 | 3
(South Africa) W Moodie (Argentina) S Prieto | 7 | 6
(United States) T Phillips (United States) B Vahaly | 6 | 6
(United States) B Coupe (United States) P Goldstein | 1 | 3
WC | (Brazil) P Braga (Brazil) J Silva | 1 | 5
4 | (Argentina) M García (United States) G Oliver | 6 | 7
(Denmark) K Carlsen (Sweden) M Norman | 6^{5} | 4
(United States) V Spadea (United States) E Taino | 7^{7} | 6
(Italy) E Artoni (Argentina) I Hirigoyen | 3 | 7^{7} | 2
2 | (United States) S Humphries (The Bahamas) M Merklein | 6 | 6^{5} | 6

Quarterfinals
WC | (Brazil) J Goffi (Brazil) R Mello | 4 | 4
(Australia) T Perry (Japan) T Shimada | 6 | 6
(Argentina) J I Chela (Brazil) F Saretta | 4 | 3
(South Africa) W Moodie (Argentina) S Prieto | 6 | 6
(United States) T Phillips (United States) B Vahaly | 1 | 6 | 3
4 | (Argentina) M García (United States) G Oliver | 6 | 2 | 6
(United States) V Spadea (United States) E Taino | 3 | 7^{7} | 2
2 | (United States) S Humphries (The Bahamas) M Merklein | 7 | 6^{5} | 7

Semifinals
(Australia) T Perry (Japan) T Shimada | 6 | 2 | 6
(South Africa) W Moodie (Argentina) S Prieto | 4 | 6 | 3
4 | (Argentina) M García (United States) G Oliver | 1 | 6^{5}
2 | (United States) S Humphries (The Bahamas) M Merklein | 6 | 7^{7}

Final
(Australia) T Perry (Japan) T Shimada | 6 | 6
2 | (United States) S Humphries (The Bahamas) M Merklein | 2 | 4
