= Sorana Cîrstea career statistics =

Career finals
Discipline	Type	Won	Lost	Total
Singles	Grand Slam	–	–	–
Singles	WTA Finals	–	–	–
Singles	WTA 1000	0	1	1
Singles	WTA Tour	4	3	7
Singles	Olympics	–	–	–
Singles	Total	4	4	8
Doubles	Grand Slam	–	–	–
Doubles	WTA Finals	–	–	–
Doubles	WTA 1000	1	0	1
Doubles	WTA Tour	5	5	10
Doubles	Olympics	–	–	–
Doubles	Total	6	5	11

This is a list of the main career statistics of the Romanian professional tennis player Sorana Cîrstea. Cirstea has won four singles and six doubles titles on the WTA Tour. She was also the runner-up at the 2013 Rogers Cup.

== Performance timelines ==
Key
W	F	SF	QF	#R	RR	Q#	DNQ	A	NH

(W) winner; (F) finalist; (SF) semifinalist; (QF) quarterfinalist; (#R) rounds 4, 3, 2, 1; (RR) round-robin stage; (Q#) qualification round; (DNQ) did not qualify; (A) absent; (NH) not held; (SR) strike rate (events won / competed); (W–L) win–loss record.
To avoid confusion and double counting, these charts are updated at the conclusion of a tournament or when the player's participation has ended.

Only main-draw results in WTA Tour, Grand Slam tournaments, Billie Jean King Cup, United Cup, Hopman Cup and Olympic Games are included in Win–Loss records.

=== Singles ===
Current through the 2026 Wimbledon Championships.

Tournament	2006	2007	2008	2009	2010	2011	2012	2013	2014	2015	2016	2017	2018	2019	2020	2021	2022	2023	2024	2025	2026	SR	W–L	Win %
Grand Slam tournaments
Australian Open	A	A	1R	1R	2R	2R	3R	3R	1R	1R	A	4R	2R	1R	2R	3R	4R	1R	1R	1R	2R	0 / 18	17–18	49%
French Open	A	A	2R	QF	1R	3R	1R	3R	3R	Q3	1R	2R	1R	2R	1R	4R	2R	1R	1R	A	QF	0 / 17	21–17	55%
Wimbledon	A	Q2	2R	3R	1R	1R	3R	2R	1R	Q2	1R	3R	2R	1R	NH	3R	2R	3R	1R	1R	3R	0 / 17	16–17	48%
US Open	A	Q1	2R	3R	1R	1R	2R	2R	2R	Q3	1R	2R	2R	3R	3R	2R	2R	QF	A	2R	4R	0 / 17	22–17	56%
Win–Loss	0–0	0–0	3–4	8–4	1–4	3–4	5–4	6–4	3–4	0–1	0–3	7–4	3–4	3–4	3–3	8–4	6–4	6–4	0–3	1–3	10–4	0 / 69	76–69	52%
Year-end championships
WTA Elite Trophy	Not held			Did not qualify											Not held			Alt	Not held			0 / 0	0–0	–
National representation
Billie Jean King Cup (Note: Formerly known as Fed Cup until 2020.)	Z1	A	Z1	Z1	A	A	A	Z1	PO2	A	A	WG2	PO	A	A (Note: The 2020–21 edition was played across two calendar years because of the COVID-19 pandemic.)		A	A	A	A		0 / 0	11–6	65%
Summer Olympics	Not held		1R	Not held			1R	Not held			A	Not held				A	Not held		A	NH		0 / 2	0–2	0%
WTA 1000 tournaments
Qatar Open	NTI		A	Not held		NTI	2R	2R	2R	NTI	A	NTI	3R	NTI	1R	NTI	2R	NTI	2R	A	A	0 / 7	7–7	50%
Dubai Championships	NTI		A	1R	1R	A	Not Tier I			A	NTI	A	NTI	A	NTI	2R	NTI	2R	SF	QF	3R	0 / 6	9–6	60%
Indian Wells Open	A	A	A	2R	2R	1R	2R	3R	2R	A	A	1R	2R	Q2	NH	3R	4R	QF	2R	2R	3R	0 / 13	12–13	48%
Miami Open	A	A	1R	1R	2R	1R	1R	4R	2R	1R	Q2	3R	2R	Q1	NH	2R	2R	SF	4R	2R	4R	0 / 15	14–15	48%
Madrid Open	Not held			1R	1R	A	2R	2R	1R	A	QF	QF	2R	2R	NH	1R	1R	2R	3R	1R	3R	0 / 14	12–14	46%
Italian Open	A	A	A	A	A	A	3R	1R	1R	A	A	Q1	1R	A	A	A	1R	2R	4R	A	SF	0 / 8	9–8	53%
Canadian Open	A	A	A	A	Q3	A	1R	F	1R	A	A	1R	2R	A	NH	2R	A	2R	A	1R	2R	0 / 8	8–9	47%
Cincinnati Open	Not Tier I			3R	1R	Q2	2R	A	1R	A	Q2	Q1	Q2	A	Q2	1R	2R	2R	A	4R	4R	0 / 9	10–9	53%
China Open	Not Tier I			1R	A	A	2R	1R	Q1	A	A	QF	1R	A	Not Held			1R	A	2R		0 / 7	5–7	42%
Pan Pacific / Wuhan Open	A	A	A	1R	A	A	1R	3R	Q1	A	A	2R	Q1	A	Not held				A	2R		0 / 5	4–5	44%
Charleston Open	A	A	3R	Not Tier I											NH	Not Tier I						0 / 1	2–1	67%
Zurich Open	Q1	A	NTI	Not held																		0 / 0	0–0	–
Win–Loss	0–0	0–0	2–2	2–7	2–5	0–2	7–9	12–8	1–7	0–1	3–1	9–6	5–7	1–1	0–1	4–6	4–6	14–8	8–5	5–3	14–7	0 / 91	93–92	50%
Career statistics
	2006	2007	2008	2009	2010	2011	2012	2013	2014	2015	2016	2017	2018	2019	2020	2021	2022	2023	2024	2025	2026	SR	W–L	Win %
Tournaments	1	6	18	24	23	16	27	26	21	4	12	21	21	15	8	19	20	21	16	19	16	Career total: 354		
Titles	0	0	1	0	0	0	0	0	0	0	0	0	0	0	0	1	0	0	0	1	1	Career total: 4		
Finals	0	1	1	0	0	0	0	1	0	0	0	0	0	1	0	2	0	0	0	1	1	Career total: 8		
Hard Win–Loss	0–1	3–3	14–6	9–17	8–15	7–9	22–18	26–18	12–16	0–2	1–4	15–15	8–12	11–7	4–6	11–12	14–12	19–14	9–8	25–15	20–8	3 / 214	238–218	52%
Clay Win–Loss	0–0	5–3	10–8	10–7	5–8	5–5	6–5	5–6	4–5	1–2	7–6	9–6	5–6	7–7	0–2	11–3	4–5	2–4	3–5	3–2	13–5	1 / 100	115–100	53%
Grass Win–Loss	0–0	0–0	4–3	3–2	1–2	1–2	2–4	3–3	0–1	0–0	2–2	3–2	1–3	0–1	NH	2–3	4–3	3–3	0–3	0–1	3–2	0 / 40	32–40	44%
Overall Win–Loss	0–1	8–6	28–17	22–26	14–25	13–16	30–27	34–27	16–22	1–4	10–12	27–23	14–21	18–15	4–8	24–18	22–20	24–21	12–16	28–18	36–15	4 / 354	385–358	52%
Year-end ranking (Note: 2004: WTA ranking–893, 2005: WTA ranking–711.)	348	106	37	46	95	60	27	22	93	244	81	37	86	72	86	38	38	26	70	44		$9,461,597		

=== Doubles ===
Current through the 2026 Wimbledon Championships.

Tournament	2005	2006	2007	2008	2009	2010	2011	2012	2013	2014	2015	2016	2017	2018	2019	2020	2021	2022	2023	2024	2025	2026	SR	W–L	Win %
Grand Slam tournaments
Australian Open	A	A	A	A	2R	1R	2R	1R	A	A	A	A	1R	3R	2R	A	A	A	A	1R	A	1R	0 / 11	5–11	31%
French Open	A	A	A	3R	1R	1R	1R	1R	2R	1R	A	A	1R	3R	A	A	A	A	A	A	A	A	0 / 9	5–9	36%
Wimbledon	A	A	A	2R	2R	A	3R	1R	1R	A	A	A	A	1R	2R	NH	A	A	A	A	QF	A	0 / 8	8–8	50%
US Open	A	A	A	2R	3R	2R	2R	1R	1R	2R	A	A	3R	1R	A	A	A	A	A	A	1R		0 / 10	8–10	44%
Win–Loss	0–0	0–0	0–0	4–3	4–4	1–3	4–4	0–4	1–3	1–2	0–0	0–0	2–3	4–4	2–2	0–0	0–0	0–0	0–0	0–1	3–2	0–1	0 / 38	26–38	41%
National representation
Billie Jean King Cup	A	Z1	A	Z1	Z1	A	A	A	Z1	PO2	A	A	WG2	PO	A	A		A	A	A	A	A	0 / 0	5–7	42%
Summer Olympics	Not held			A	Not held			1R	Not held			A	Not held				A	Not held		A			0 / 1	0–1	0%
WTA 1000 tournaments
Qatar Open	Not Tier I			A	Not held		NTI	1R	NTI	A	NTI	A	NTI	A	NTI	A	NTI	A	NTI	A	A	A	0 / 1	0–1	0%
Dubai Championships	Not Tier I				1R	1R	A	NTI	A	NTI	A	NTI	A	NTI	A	NTI	A	NTI	A	A	A	A	0 / 2	0–2	0%
Indian Wells Open	A	A	A	A	1R	A	A	A	A	A	A	A	A	A	A	NH	A	A	A	A	A	A	0 / 1	0–1	0%
Miami Open	A	A	A	A	1R	A	A	A	A	2R	A	A	A	A	A	NH	A	A	A	A	A	1R	0 / 3	1–3	25%
Madrid Open	Not held				1R	1R	A	A	A	A	A	A	A	1R	A	NH	A	A	A	A	W	A	1 / 4	5–3	63%
Italian Open	A	A	A	A	A	A	A	A	A	A	A	A	A	SF	A	A	A	A	A	A	A	2R	0 / 2	4–2	67%
Canadian Open	A	A	A	A	A	A	A	A	A	A	A	A	A	A	A	NH	A	A	A	A	A		0 / 0	0–0	–
Cincinnati Open	Not Tier I				A	A	A	A	A	A	A	A	A	A	A	NH	A	A	A	A	1R		0 / 1	0–1	0%
China Open	Not Tier I				1R	A	A	A	A	A	A	A	1R	A	A	Not held			A	A	A		0 / 2	0–2	0%
Pan Pacific / Wuhan Open	A	A	A	A	A	A	A	A	A	A	A	A	A	A	A	Not held				A	A		0 / 0	0–0	–
Charleston Open	A	A	A	1R	Not Tier I											NH	Not Tier I						0 / 1	0–1	0%
Win–Loss	0–0	0–0	0–0	0–1	0–5	0–2	0–0	0–1	0–0	1–1	0–0	0–0	0–1	3–2	0–0	0–0	0–0	0–0	0–0	0–0	5–1	1–2	1 / 17	10–16	38%
Career statistics
	2005	2006	2007	2008	2009	2010	2011	2012	2013	2014	2015	2016	2017	2018	2019	2020	2021	2022	2023	2024	2025	2026	SR	W–L	Win %
Tournaments	0	1	4	9	20	12	12	12	7	6	1	0	5	8	4	0	0	1	0	1	4	4	Career total: 111		
Titles	0	0	0	2	0	1	1	0	0	0	0	0	0	0	1	0	0	0	0	0	1	1	Career total: 7		
Finals	0	0	0	3	2	2	1	0	0	1	0	0	0	0	1	0	0	0	0	0	1	1	Career total: 12		
Overall Win–Loss	0–0	0–2	1–4	16–8	20–21	10–11	12–11	3–12	3–8	6–7	1–1	0–0	4–4	8–9	6–3	0–0	0–0	1–1	0–0	0–1	8–4	6–3	7 / 111	105–110	49%
Year-end ranking (Note: 2004: WTA ranking – 659.)	639	292	200	46	50	87	69	226	316	136	472	no rank	254	95	144	207	no rank	532	1357	1191	57				

=== Mixed doubles ===
Current through the 2026 Wimbledon Championships.

Tournament	2012	2013	2014	2015	2016	2017	2018	2019	2020	2021	SR	W–L
Grand Slam tournaments
Australian Open	A	1R	A	A	A	A	A	A	A	A	0 / 1	0–1
French Open	A	A	A	A	A	A	A	A	A	A	0 / 0	0–0
Wimbledon	A	2R	A	A	A	3R	A	A	NH	A	0 / 2	3–2
US Open	A	A	A	A	A	A	A	A	NH	A	0 / 0	0–0
Win–Loss	0–0	1–2	0–0	0–0	0–0	2–1	0–0	0–0	0–0	0–0	0 / 3	3–3
National representation
Olympic Games	4th	Not Held			A	Not Held			A (Note: The 2020 Summer Olympics were held in 2021 because of the COVID-19 pandemic.)		0 / 1	2–2
Overall win–loss	2–2	1–2	0–0	0–0	0–0	2–1	0–0	0–0	0–0	0–0	0 / 4	5–5

== WTA 1000 tournament finals ==
=== Singles: 1 (runner-up) ===
Result	Year	Tournament	Surface	Opponent	Score
Loss	2013	Canadian Open	Hard	(United States) Serena Williams	2–6, 0–6

=== Doubles: 1 (title) ===
Result	Year	Tournament	Surface	Partner	Opponents	Score
Win	2025	Madrid Open	Clay	Anna Kalinskaya	Veronika Kudermetova (Belgium) Elise Mertens	6–7^{(10–12)}, 6–2, [12–10]

== WTA Tour finals ==
=== Singles: 8 (4 titles, 4 runner-ups) ===
Legend Premier 5 (0–1) Tier III & IV / WTA 250 / (4–3)	Finals by surface Hard (3–2) Clay (1–2)	Finals by setting Outdoor (3–4) Indoor (1–0)

Result	W–L	Date	Tournament	Tier	Surface	Opponent	Score
Loss	0–1	Apr 2007	Budapest Grand Prix, Hungary	Tier III	Clay	(Argentina) Gisela Dulko	7–6^{(7–2)}, 2–6, 2–6
Win	1–1	Oct 2008	Tashkent Open, Uzbekistan	Tier IV	Hard	(Germany) Sabine Lisicki	2–6, 6–4, 7–6^{(7–4)}
Loss	1–2	Aug 2013	Canadian Open, Canada	Premier 5	Hard	(United States) Serena Williams	2–6, 0–6
Loss	1–3	Sep 2019	Tashkent Open, Uzbekistan	International	Hard	(Belgium) Alison Van Uytvanck	2–6, 6–4, 4–6
Win	2–3	Apr 2021	İstanbul Cup, Turkey	WTA 250	Clay	(Belgium) Elise Mertens	6–1, 7–6^{(7–3)}
Loss	2–4	May 2021	Internationaux de Strasbourg, France	WTA 250	Clay	(Czech Republic) Barbora Krejčíková	3–6, 3–6
Win	3–4	Aug 2025	Tennis in the Land, United States	WTA 250	Hard	(United States) Ann Li	6–2, 6–4
Win	4–4	Feb 2026	Transylvania Open, Romania	WTA 250	Hard (i)	(United Kingdom) Emma Raducanu	6–0, 6–2

=== Doubles: 12 (7 titles, 5 runner-ups) ===
Legend WTA 1000 (1–0) Tier II / WTA 500 (1–1) Tier III & IV / International (5–4)	Finals by surface Hard (2–2) Clay (5–3)	Finals by setting Outdoor (5–5) Indoor (2–0)

Result	W–L	Date	Tournament	Tier	Surface	Partner	Opponent	Score
Win	1–0	May 2008	Morocco Open, Morocco	Tier IV	Clay	(Russia) Anastasia Pavlyuchenkova	(Russia) Alisa Kleybanova (Russia) Ekaterina Makarova	6–2, 6–2
Loss	1–1	Aug 2008	Connecticut Open, United States	Tier II	Hard	(Romania) Monica Niculescu	(Czech Republic) Květa Peschke (United States) Lisa Raymond	6–4, 5–7, [7–10]
Win	2–1	Oct 2008	Luxembourg Open, Luxembourg	Tier III	Hard (i)	(New Zealand) Marina Erakovic	(Russia) Vera Dushevina (Ukraine) Mariya Koryttseva	2–6, 6–3, [10–8]
Loss	2–2	Apr 2009	Barcelona Open, Spain	International	Clay	(Slovenia) Andreja Klepač	(Spain) Nuria Llagostera Vives (Spain) María José Martínez Sánchez	6–3, 2–6, [8–10]
Loss	2–3	Apr 2009	Morocco Open, Morocco	International	Clay	(Russia) Maria Kirilenko	(Russia) Alisa Kleybanova (Russia) Ekaterina Makarova	3–6, 6–2, [8–10]
Win	3–3	May 2010	Estoril Open, Portugal	International	Clay	(Spain) Anabel Medina Garrigues	(Russia) Vitalia Diatchenko (France) Aurélie Védy	6–1, 7–5
Loss	3–4	Jul 2010	Budapest Grand Prix, Hungary	International	Clay	(Spain) Anabel Medina Garrigues	(Switzerland) Timea Bacsinszky (Italy) Tathiana Garbin	3–6, 3–6
Win	4–4	Aug 2011	Texas Open, United States	International	Hard	(Italy) Alberta Brianti	(France) Alizé Cornet (France) Pauline Parmentier	7–5, 6–3
Loss	4–5	Oct 2014	Tianjin Open, China	International	Hard	(Slovenia) Andreja Klepač	(Russia) Alla Kudryavtseva (Australia) Anastasia Rodionova	7–6^{(6–8)}, 2–6, [8–10]
Win	5–5	Apr 2019	Lugano Open, Switzerland	International	Clay	(Romania) Andreea Mitu	(Russia) Veronika Kudermetova (Kazakhstan) Galina Voskoboeva	1–6, 6–2, [10–8]
Win	6–5	Apr 2025	Madrid Open, Spain	WTA 1000	Clay	Anna Kalinskaya	Veronika Kudermetova (Belgium) Elise Mertens	6–7^{(10–12)}, 6–2, [12–10]
Win	7–5	Apr 2026	Linz Open, Austria	WTA 500	Clay (i)	(China) Zhang Shuai	(Czech Republic) Jesika Malečková (Czech Republic) Miriam Škoch	6–3, 6–2

== WTA 125 finals ==
=== Singles: 1 (title) ===
Result	Date	Tournament	Surface	Opponent	Score
Win	May 2023	Catalonia Open, Spain	Clay	(United States) Elizabeth Mandlik	6–1, 4–6, 7–6^{(7–1)}

== ITF Circuit finals ==
=== Singles: 16 (9 titles, 7 runner-ups) ===
Legend
$100,000 tournaments
$80,000 tournaments
$50,000 tournaments
$25,000 tournaments
$10,000 tournaments

Result	W–L	Date	Tournament	Tier	Surface	Opponent	Score
Win	1–0	Oct 2005	ITF Porto Santo, Portugal	10,000	Hard	(Netherlands) Pauline Wong	6–2, 7–6^{(7–3)}
Win	2–0	Feb 2006	ITF Albufeira, Portugal	10,000	Hard	(Netherlands) Chayenne Ewijk	6–0, 7–5
Loss	2–1	May 2006	ITF Bucharest, Romania	10,000	Clay	(Romania) Raluca Olaru	6–1, 4–6, 1–6
Win	3–1	May 2006	ITF Bucharest, Romania	10,000	Clay	(Romania) Simona Matei	6–2, 2–6, 7–5
Win	4–1	Jul 2007	Open Romania Ladies	25,000	Clay	(Romania) Alexandra Dulgheru	6–4, 6–3
Loss	4–2	Nov 2007	ITF Minsk, Belarus	50,000	Hard (i)	(Russia) Evgeniya Rodina	1–6, 1–6
Loss	4–3	May 2008	ITF Bucharest, Romania	50,000	Clay	(Czech Republic) Petra Cetkovská	6–7^{(5–7)}, 6–7^{(3–7)}
Loss	4–4	Jul 2008	International Country Cuneo, Italy	100,000	Clay	(Italy) Tathiana Garbin	3–6, 1–6
Loss	4–5	Sep 2008	ITF Athens Open, Greece	100,000	Clay	(Spain) Lourdes Domínguez Lino	4–6, 4–6
Loss	4–6	Oct 2010	Las Vegas Open, United States	50,000	Hard	(United States) Varvara Lepchenko	2–6, 0–6
Win	5–6	May 2011	Open de Cagnes-sur-Mer, France	100,000	Clay	(France) Pauline Parmentier	6–7^{(5–7)}, 6–2, 6–2
Win	6–6	Sep 2011	Open de Saint-Malo, France	100,000	Clay	(Spain) Sílvia Soler Espinosa	6–2, 6–2
Win	7–6	Oct 2011	Open de Limoges, France	50,000	Hard (i)	(Sweden) Sofia Arvidsson	6–2, 6–2
Loss	7–7	Jan 2016	ITF Guarujá, Brazil	25,000	Hard	(Paraguay) Montserrat González	6–1, 6–7^{(5–7)}, 2–6
Win	8–7	Jan 2016	ITF Bertioga, Brazil	25,000	Hard	(Argentina) Catalina Pella	6–1, 6–7^{(4–7)}, 6–3
Win	9–7	Dec 2020	Dubai Tennis Challenge, UAE	100,000	Hard	(Czech Republic) Kateřina Siniaková	4–6, 6–3, 6–3

=== Doubles: 16 (9 titles, 7 runner-ups) ===
Legend
$100,000 tournaments (1–1)
$80,000 tournaments
$50,000 tournaments (0–1)
$25,000 tournaments (3–2)
$10,000 tournaments (5–3)

Result	W–L	Date	Tournament	Tier	Surface	Partner	Opponent	Score
Win	1–0	Aug 2004	ITF Timişoara, Romania	10,000	Clay	(Romania) Gabriela Niculescu	(Romania) Lenore Lazaroiu (Romania) Raluca Olaru	6–1, 2–6, 6–2
Win	2–0	Sep 2004	ITF Arad, Romania	10,000	Clay	(Romania) Gabriela Niculescu	(Israel) Yevgenia Savransky (Czech Republic) Sandra Záhlavová	6–2, 6–2
Loss	2–1	Aug 2005	ITF Bucharest, Romania	10,000	Clay	(Romania) Bianca Ioana Bonifate	(Romania) Corina Corduneanu (Romania) Raluca Olaru	1–6, 1–6
Win	3–1	Oct 2005	ITF Porto Santo, Portugal	10,000	Hard	(Romania) Alexandra Orăşanu	(Sweden) Diana Eriksson (Sweden) Nadja Roma	5–7, 7–5, 6–4
Win	4–1	Oct 2005	ITF Porto Santo, Portugal	10,000	Hard	(Romania) Alexandra Orăşanu	(Germany) Hannah Kuervers (Germany) Imke Kusgen	6–7^{(2–7)}, 6–4, 6–0
Loss	4–2	Feb 2006	ITF Albufeira, Portugal	10,000	Hard	(Slovenia) Polona Reberšak	(France) Émilie Bacquet (Netherlands) Chayenne Ewijk	4–6, 4–6
Win	5–2	May 2006	ITF Bucharest, Romania	10,000	Clay	(Romania) Gabriela Niculescu	(Romania) Simona Matei (Romania) Raluca Olaru	6–4, 0–6, 7–6^{(7–3)}
Loss	5–3	May 2006	ITF Bucharest, Romania	10,000	Clay	(Romania) Diana Enache	(Romania) Gabriela Niculescu (Romania) Monica Niculescu	3–6, 0–6
Win	6–3	Sep 2006	ITF Madrid, Spain	25,000	Hard	(United Kingdom) Katie O'Brien	(Switzerland) Gaëlle Widmer (France) Céline Cattaneo	6–4, 6–4
Loss	6–4	Oct 2006	ITF Istanbul, Turkey	25,000	Hard (i)	(United Kingdom) Katie O'Brien	(Bosnia and Herzegovina) Mervana Jugić-Salkić (Turkey) İpek Şenoğlu	walkover
Loss	6–5	Oct 2006	ITF Stockholm, Sweden	25,000	Hard (i)	(United Kingdom) Melanie South	(Montenegro) Danica Krstajić (Russia) Olga Panova	2–6, 6–0, 2–6
Win	7–5	Mar 2007	ITF Las Palmas, Spain	25,000	Hard	(Romania) Mădălina Gojnea	(United Kingdom) Claire Curran (United Kingdom) Melanie South	4–6, 7–6^{(7–5)}, 6–4
Win	8–5	Aug 2007	Open Romania Ladies, Romania	25,000	Clay	(Romania) Ágnes Szatmári	(Romania) Mihaela Buzărnescu (Romania) Monica Niculescu	walkover
Loss	8–6	May 2008	ITF Bucharest, Romania	50,000	Clay	(Romania) Ágnes Szatmári	(Czech Republic) Petra Cetkovská (Czech Republic) Hana Sromová	4–6, 5–7
Win	9–6	Sep 2008	ITF Athens Open, Greece	100,000	Clay	(Kazakhstan) Galina Voskoboeva	(Germany) Kristina Barrois (Germany) Julia Schruff	6–2, 6–4
Loss	9–7	Jun 2010	International Country Cuneo, Italy	100,000	Clay	(Slovenia) Andreja Klepač	(Czech Republic) Eva Birnerová (Czech Republic) Lucie Hradecká	3–6, 6–4, [10–8]

== WTA Tour career earnings ==
Current as of 20 July 2026.

Year	Grand Slam singles titles	WTA singles titles	Total singles titles	Earnings ($)	Money list rank
2005	0	0	0	Not listed	Outside top 100
2006	0	0	0	Not listed	Outside top 100
2007	0	0	0	Not listed	Outside top 100
2008	0	1	1	280,238	59
2009	0	0	0	531,035	37
2010	0	0	0	224,541	82
2011	0	0	0	264,484	71
2012	0	0	0	415,640	52
2013	0	0	0	769,626	31
2014	0	0	0	417,619	72
2015	0	0	0	96,588	184
2016	0	0	0	311,449	99
2017	0	0	0	899,657	40
2018	0	0	0	613,499	64
2019	0	0	0	538,932	78
2020	0	0	0	362,893	60
2021	0	1	1	826,314	38
2022	0	0	0	820,594	48
2023	0	0	0	1,506,584	21
2024	0	0	0	738,861	80
2025	0	1	1	1,076,818	58
2026	0	1	1	1,702,936	20
Career	0	4	4	12,527,864	62

== Career Grand Slam statistics ==
=== Seedings ===
The tournaments won by Cîrstea are in boldface, and advanced into finals by Cîrstea are in italics.

Season	Australian Open	French Open	Wimbledon	US Open
2007	did not play	did not play	did not qualify	did not qualify
2008	not seeded	not seeded	not seeded	not seeded
2009	not seeded	not seeded	28th	24th
2010	not seeded	not seeded	not seeded	not seeded
2011	not seeded	not seeded	not seeded	not seeded
2012	not seeded	not seeded	not seeded	not seeded
2013	27th	26th	22nd	19th
2014	21st	26th	29th	not seeded
2015	not seeded	did not qualify	did not qualify	did not qualify
2016	did not play	qualifier	not seeded	not seeded
2017	not seeded	not seeded	not seeded	not seeded
2018	not seeded	not seeded	not seeded	not seeded
2019	not seeded	not seeded	not seeded	not seeded
2020	not seeded	not seeded	not held	not seeded
2021	not seeded	not seeded	not seeded	not seeded
2022	not seeded	26th	26th	not seeded
2023	not seeded	30th	not seeded	30th
2024	22nd	28th	29th	did not play
2025	not seeded	did not play	protected ranking	protected ranking
2026	not seeded	18th	17th	

=== Best Grand Slam results details ===
Grand Slam winners are in boldface, and runner–ups are in italics.

**Australian Open**
**2017 Australian Open (not seeded)**
Round	Opponent	Rank	Score
1R	(Russia) Irina Khromacheva	95	6–2, 6–1
2R	(Spain) Carla Suárez Navarro (10)	12	7–6^{(7–1)}, 6–3
3R	(United States) Alison Riske	42	6–2, 7–6^{(7–2)}
4R	(Spain) Garbiñe Muguruza (7)	7	2–6, 3–6
**2022 Australian Open (not seeded)**
Round	Opponent	Rank	Score
1R	(Czech Republic) Petra Kvitová (20)	19	6–2, 6–2
2R	(Slovakia) Kristína Kučová	96	6–2, 6–4
3R	(Russia) Anastasia Pavlyuchenkova (10)	11	6–3, 2–6, 6–2
4R	(Poland) Iga Świątek (7)	9	7–5, 3–6, 3–6

**Wimbledon Championships**
**2009 Wimbledon Championships (28th)**
Round	Opponent	Rank	Score
1R	(Romania) Edina Gallovits	96	7–5, 6–1
2R	(India) Sania Mirza	85	6–4, 6–4
3R	(Belarus) Victoria Azarenka (8)	8	6–7^{(2–7)}, 3–6
**2012 Wimbledon Championships (not seeded)**
Round	Opponent	Rank	Score
1R	(France) Pauline Parmentier	70	6–4, 6–1
2R	(China) Li Na (11)	11	6–3, 6–4
3R	(Russia) Maria Kirilenko (17)	19	3–6, 1–6
**2017 Wimbledon Championships (not seeded)**
Round	Opponent	Rank	Score
1R	(Netherlands) Kiki Bertens (23)	24	7–6^{(7–4)}, 7–5
2R	(United States) Bethanie Mattek-Sands (WC)	103	4–6, 7–6^{(7–4)}, ret.
3R	**(Spain) Garbiñe Muguruza (14)**	15	2–6, 2–6
**2021 Wimbledon Championships (not seeded)**
Round	Opponent	Rank	Score
1R	(United Kingdom) Samantha Murray Sharan (8)	230	6–3, 6–3
2R	(Belarus) Victoria Azarenka (12)	14	7–6^{(7–5)}, 3–6, 6–4
3R	(United Kingdom) Emma Raducanu (WC)	338	3–6, 5–7
**2023 Wimbledon Championships (not seeded)**
Round	Opponent	Rank	Score
1R	(Germany) Tatjana Maria	62	6–1, 2–6, 6–3
2R	(Latvia) Jeļena Ostapenko (17)	17	4–6, 7–6^{(8–6)}, 6–4
3R	(Brazil) Beatriz Haddad Maia (13)	13	2–6, 2–6
**2026 Wimbledon Championships (17th)**
Round	Opponent	Rank	Score
1R	(Czech Republic) Sára Bejlek		6–1, 7–6
2R	(Australia) Kimberly Birrell		6–3, 6–4
3R	(Czech Republic) **Linda Noskova** (9)	12	6–2, 3–6, 6–7^{(9–11)}

**French Open**
**2009 French Open (not seeded)**
Round	Opponent	Rank	Score
1R	(United States) Carly Gullickson (Q)	136	6–4, 6–2
2R	(France) Alizé Cornet (21)	21	6–3, 6–2
3R	(Denmark) Caroline Wozniacki (10)	10	7–6^{(7–3)}, 7–5
4R	(Serbia) Jelena Janković (5)	5	3–6, 6–0, 9–7
QF	(Australia) Samantha Stosur (30)	32	1–6, 3–6

**US Open**
**2023 US Open (30th)**
Round	Opponent	Rank	Score
1R	(United States) Kayla Day (WC)	93	6–2, 6–3
2R	Anna Kalinskaya	89	6–3, 6–4
3R	(Kazakhstan) Elena Rybakina (4)	4	6–3, 6–7^{(6–8)}, 6–4
4R	(Switzerland) Belinda Bencic (15)	13	6–3, 6–3
QF	(Czech Republic) Karolína Muchová (10)	10	0–6, 3–6

== Wins against top 10 players ==
- Cîrstea has a 25–63 (28%) record against players who were, at the time the match was played, ranked in the top 10.

#	Opponent	Rk	Event	Surface	Rd	Score	Rk	Ref
2008
1.	(Serbia) Jelena Janković	4	Fed Cup, Hungary	Carpet	ZG1	6–3, 3–6, 6–4	112	
2.	(Russia) Anna Chakvetadze	6	Charleston Open, United States	Clay	2R	6–2, 1–6, 6–2	86	
2009
3.	(Denmark) Caroline Wozniacki	10	French Open, France	Clay	3R	7–6^{(7–3)}, 7–5	41	
4.	(Serbia) Jelena Janković	5	French Open, France	Clay	4R	3–6, 6–0, 9–7	41	
5.	(Denmark) Caroline Wozniacki	8	LA Championships, United States	Hard	1R	1–6, 6–4, 7–6^{(7–5)}	28	
2010
6.	(Italy) Francesca Schiavone	6	Eastbourne International, UK	Grass	1R	7–5, 6–3	57	
2012
7.	(Australia) Samantha Stosur	5	Australian Open, Australia	Hard	1R	7–6^{(7–2)}, 6–3	59	
8.	(Russia) Vera Zvonareva	8	Thailand Open, Thailand	Hard	QF	2–6, 6–4, 2–2, ret.	54	
9.	(France) Marion Bartoli	7	Madrid Open, Spain	Clay	1R	6–7^{(6–8)}, 6–4, 6–3	46	
2013
10.	(Germany) Angelique Kerber	6	Miami Open, United States	Hard	3R	6–4, 6–0	27	
11.	(Denmark) Caroline Wozniacki	10	Canadian Open, Canada	Hard	3R	5–7, 7–6^{(7–0)}, 6–4	27	
12.	(Czech Republic) Petra Kvitová	7	Canadian Open, Canada	Hard	QF	4–6, 7–5, 6–2	27	
13.	(China) Li Na	5	Canadian Open, Canada	Hard	SF	6–1, 7–6^{(7–5)}	27	
2014
14.	(Italy) Sara Errani	10	Dubai Championships, UAE	Hard	2R	6–2, 5–7, 6–1	27	
2017
15.	(Czech Republic) Karolína Plíšková	4	China Open, China	Hard	3R	6–1, 7–5	44	
2021
16.	(Czech Republic) Petra Kvitová	8	Australian Open, Australia	Hard	2R	6–4, 1–6, 6–1	68	
2023
17.	(France) Caroline Garcia	5	Indian Wells Open, United States	Hard	4R	6–4, 4–6, 7–5	83	
18.	(France) Caroline Garcia	4	Miami Open, United States	Hard	2R	6–2, 6–3	74	
19.	Aryna Sabalenka	2	Miami Open, United States	Hard	QF	6–4, 6–4	74	
20.	(Kazakhstan) Elena Rybakina	4	US Open, United States	Hard	3R	6–3, 6–7^{(6–8)}, 6–4	30	
2024
21.	(Greece) Maria Sakkari	9	Abu Dhabi Open, UAE	Hard	2R	6–2, 6–1	26	
22.	(Czech Republic) Markéta Vondroušová	8	Dubai Championships, UAE	Hard	QF	2–6, 7–6^{(7–1)}, 6–2	22	
23.	(Czech Republic) Markéta Vondroušová	6	Italian Open, Italy	Clay	3R	7–6^{(7–1)}, 6–3	32	
2025
24.	(United States) Emma Navarro	9	Dubai Championships, UAE	Hard	2R	7–6^{(7–5)}, 3–6, 7–5	89	
2026
25.	Aryna Sabalenka	1	Italian Open, Italy	Clay	3R	2–6, 6–3, 7–5	27	

- Additional top 10 sources

=== Double bagel matches (6–0, 6–0) ===
Result	Year	Tournament	Surface	Opponent	Rank	Round
Win	2022	Melbourne Summer Set 2	Hard	(Russia) Varvara Gracheva	39	1R
Win	2026	French Open	Clay	(Argentina) Solana Sierra	18	3R
