= 2003 Brasil Open – Singles =

Singles
- 2003 Brasil Open

Final
- Champion: (Netherlands) Sjeng Schalken
- Runner-up: (Germany) Rainer Schüttler
- Score: 6–2, 6–4

Details
- Draw: 32
- Seeds: 8

Events
Singles	Doubles
- Brasil Open

Gustavo Kuerten was the defending champion but lost in the semifinals to Rainer Schüttler.

Sjeng Schalken won in the final 6–2, 6–4 against Rainer Schüttler.

== Seeds ==
1. (Germany) Rainer Schüttler (final)
2. (Netherlands) Sjeng Schalken (champion)
3. (Brazil) Gustavo Kuerten (semifinals)
4. (Chile) Fernando González (first round)
5. (United States) Vince Spadea (quarterfinals)
6. (Argentina) Juan Ignacio Chela (second round)
7. (Brazil) Flávio Saretta (second round)
8. (Denmark) Kenneth Carlsen (quarterfinals)

== Draw ==
Key

- Q = Qualifier
- WC = Wild card
- LL = Lucky loser
- Alt = Alternate
- ITF = ITF entry
- PR = Protected ranking
- SR = Special ranking
- SE = Special exempt
- JE = Junior exempt
- JR = Junior Accelerator Programme entrant
- CO = College Accelerator Programme entrant
- NG = Next Gen Accelerator Program entrant
- w/o = Walkover
- r = Retired
- d = Defaulted

=== Finals ===
Semifinals
1	(Germany) Rainer Schüttler	6	2	7
3	(Brazil) Gustavo Kuerten	4	6	5
Q	(Argentina) Gastón Etlis	1	0^{r}
2	(Netherlands) Sjeng Schalken	6	2

Final
1	(Germany) Rainer Schüttler	2	4
2	(Netherlands) Sjeng Schalken	6	6

=== Top half ===
First round
1	(Germany) R Schüttler	6	6
WC	(Brazil) A Sá	2	0
(United States) P Goldstein	6	6
(Argentina) F Browne	2	0
(Paraguay) R Delgado	6	5
(Argentina) M Puerta	3	1^{r}
WC	(Brazil) M Daniel	4	3
7	(Brazil) F Saretta	6	6
3	(Brazil) G Kuerten	6	6
(Sweden) M Norman	3	2
(Austria) W Eschauer	5	7^{7}	7^{7}
Q	(Brazil) J Silva	7	6^{2}	6^{1}
Q	(Chile) P Capdeville	7^{7}	0	1
(Brazil) R Mello	6^{4}	6	6
(Australia) T Larkham	4	6	1
6	(Argentina) J I Chela	6	2	6

Second round
1	(Germany) R Schüttler	6	6
(United States) P Goldstein	0	1
(Paraguay) R Delgado	2	6	6
7	(Brazil) F Saretta	6	3	4
3	(Brazil) G Kuerten	6	6
(Austria) W Eschauer	2	1
(Brazil) R Mello	2	6	6
6	(Argentina) J I Chela	6	2	4

Quarterfinals
1	(Germany) R Schüttler	6	6
(Paraguay) R Delgado	1	3
3	(Brazil) G Kuerten	6	6
(Brazil) R Mello	2	2

Semifinals
1	(Germany) R Schüttler	6	2	7
3	(Brazil) G Kuerten	4	6	5

=== Bottom half ===
First round
8	(Denmark) K Carlsen	4	6	7^{13}
WC	(Brazil) F Ferreiro	6	4	6^{11}
(Peru) I Miranda	4	4
(South Africa) W Moodie	6	6
Q	(Argentina) G Etlis	1	6	6
(United States) B Vahaly	6	2	3
(United States) E Taino	7^{7}	7
4	(Chile) F González	6^{5}	5
5	(United States) V Spadea	6	7
(Argentina) G Cañas	4	5
(Chile) H Gamonal	7^{7}	6
Q	(Colombia) M Quintero	6^{0}	2
(Germany) A Popp	1	6	1
(France) G Carraz	6	4	6
(France) C Saulnier	6^{4}	6	3
2	(Netherlands) S Schalken	7^{7}	2	6

Second round
8	(Denmark) K Carlsen	7	6^{5}	6
(South Africa) W Moodie	5	7^{7}	3
Q	(Argentina) G Etlis	7	4	7^{7}
(United States) E Taino	5	6	6^{5}
5	(United States) V Spadea	6	2	3
(Chile) H Gamonal	1	6	1^{r}
(France) G Carraz	5	4
2	(Netherlands) S Schalken	7	6

Quarterfinals
8	(Denmark) K Carlsen	4	7^{7}	3
Q	(Argentina) G Etlis	6	6^{2}	6
5	(United States) V Spadea	6^{0}	2
2	(Netherlands) S Schalken	7^{7}	6

Semifinals
Q	(Argentina) G Etlis	1	0^{r}
2	(Netherlands) S Schalken	6	2
