= 2002 WTA Madrid Open – Doubles =

Doubles
- 2002 WTA Madrid Open

Final
- Champions: (United States) Martina Navratilova (Belarus) Natasha Zvereva
- Runners-up: (Paraguay) Rossana de los Ríos (Spain) Arantxa Sánchez Vicario
- Score: 6–2, 6–3

Details
- Draw: 16 (1WC/1Q/1LL)
- Seeds: 4

Events
Singles	Doubles
← 2001 ·	WTA Madrid Open	· 2003 →

Virginia Ruano Pascual and Paola Suárez were the defending champions, but both players opted to focus only on the singles tournament. Ruano Pascual retired in her first round match, while Suárez reached the semifinals before losing to tournament champion Monica Seles.

Martina Navratilova and Natasha Zvereva won the title by defeating Rossana de los Ríos and Arantxa Sánchez Vicario 6–2, 6–3 in the final.

== Seeds ==
1. (Zimbabwe) Cara Black / (Australia) Nicole Pratt (quarterfinals, withdrew)
2. (Paraguay) Rossana de los Ríos / (Spain) Arantxa Sánchez Vicario (final)
3. (South Africa) Nannie de Villiers / (Argentina) Laura Montalvo (quarterfinals)
4. (Australia) Alicia Molik / (Spain) Magüi Serna (quarterfinals)

== Draw ==
=== Key ===
- Q = Qualifier
- WC = Wild card
- LL = Lucky loser
- Alt = Alternate
- SE = Special exempt
- PR = Protected ranking
- ITF = ITF entry
- JE = Junior exempt
- w/o = Walkover
- r = Retired
- d = Defaulted
- SR = Special ranking

=== Draw ===
First round
1	(Zimbabwe) C Black (Australia) N Pratt	3	6	6
(Germany) B Lamade (United States) S Reeves	6	4	0
(United States) M Middleton (United States) B Rippner	3	1
(Argentina) C Fernández (Italy) R Grande	6	6
3	(South Africa) N de Villiers (Argentina) L Montalvo	6	2	6
(South Africa) N Rencken (Australia) S Stone	2	6	0
(United States) M Navratilova (Belarus) N Zvereva	6	6
(United States) A Frazier (Russia) A Jidkova	3	3
(South Africa) N Grandin (United States) A Spears	6	6
WC	(Spain) G León García (Spain) C Torrens Valero	3	4
(Spain) M Ramón Climent (Spain) G Riera	2	3
4	(Australia) A Molik (Spain) M Serna	6	6
Q	(Argentina) J Cravero (Spain) A Parra Santonja	4	6^{3}
(Republic of Ireland) K Liggan (India) M Malhotra	6	7^{7}
LL	(Australia) Jenny Belobrajdic (Australia) N Sewell	5	4
2	(Paraguay) R de los Ríos (Spain) A Sánchez Vicario	7	6

Quarterfinals
1	(Zimbabwe) C Black (Australia) N Pratt
(Argentina) C Fernández (Italy) R Grande	w/o
3	(South Africa) N de Villiers (Argentina) L Montalvo	2	7	3
(United States) M Navratilova (Belarus) N Zvereva	6	5	6
(South Africa) N Grandin (United States) A Spears	6	6
4	(Australia) A Molik (Spain) M Serna	4	3
(Republic of Ireland) K Liggan (India) M Malhotra	4	2
2	(Paraguay) R de los Ríos (Spain) A Sánchez Vicario	6	6

Semifinals
(Argentina) C Fernández (Italy) R Grande	1	6^{4}
(United States) M Navratilova (Belarus) N Zvereva	6	7^{7}
(South Africa) N Grandin (United States) A Spears	4	3
2	(Paraguay) R de los Ríos (Spain) A Sánchez Vicario	6	6

Final
(United States) M Navratilova (Belarus) N Zvereva	6	6
2	(Paraguay) R de los Ríos (Spain) A Sánchez Vicario	2	3
