= ITF Athens Open =

ITF Women's Tour
- Event name: ITF Athens Open (2010); Vogue Athens Open (2008–2009)
- Location: Athens, Greece
- Venue: Athens Olympic Tennis Centre
- Category: ITF Women's Circuit
- Surface: Clay (2008); Hard (2009–2010)
- Draw: 32S/32Q/16D
- Prize money: $50,000

The ITF Athens Open (previously known as the Vogue Athens Open) was a tournament for professional female tennis players played on outdoor hard courts. The event was classified as a $50,000 ITF Women's Circuit tournament and was held in Athens, Greece, from 2008 to 2010.

== Past finals ==
=== Singles ===
Year	Champion	Runner-up	Score
2010	(Greece) Eleni Daniilidou	(Spain) Laura Pous Tió	6–4, 6–1
2009	(Australia) Jelena Dokic	(Greece) Eleni Daniilidou	6–2, 6–1
2008	(Spain) Lourdes Domínguez Lino	(Romania) Sorana Cîrstea	6–4, 6–4

=== Doubles ===
Year	Champions	Runners-up	Score
2010	(Russia) Vitalia Diatchenko (Turkey) İpek Şenoğlu	(Greece) Eleni Daniilidou (Croatia) Petra Martić	Walkover
2009	(Greece) Eleni Daniilidou (Germany) Jasmin Wöhr	(Switzerland) Timea Bacsinszky (Italy) Tathiana Garbin	6–2, 5–7, [10–4]
2008	(Romania) Sorana Cîrstea (Russia) Galina Voskoboeva	(Germany) Kristina Barrois (Germany) Julia Schruff	6–2, 6–4
