= 2003 Brasil Open =

- Date: 8–14 September
- Edition: 3rd
- Category: International Series
- Draw: 32S / 16D
- Prize money: $355,000
- Surface: Hard / outdoor
- Location: Mata de São João, Brazil

Champions

Singles
- (Netherlands) Sjeng Schalken

Doubles
- (Australia) Todd Perry / (Japan) Thomas Shimada
- Brasil Open

The 2003 Brasil Open was a men's tennis tournament played on outdoor hard courts in Costa do Sauípe resort, Mata de São João, in Brazil and was part of the International Series tier of the 2003 ATP Tour. It was the third edition of the tournament and ran from September 8 through September 14, 2003. Second-seeded Sjeng Schalken won the singles title.

== Finals ==
=== Singles ===
(Netherlands) Sjeng Schalken defeated (Germany) Rainer Schüttler 6–2, 6–4

- It was Schalken's 2nd and last singles title of the year and the 9th and last of his career.

=== Doubles ===
(Australia) Todd Perry / (Japan) Thomas Shimada defeated (United States) Scott Humphries / (The Bahamas) Mark Merklein 6–2, 6–4

- It was Perry's only doubles title of the year and the 1st of his career. It was Shimada's only doubles title of the year and the 3rd and last of his career.
