= Eleni Daniilidou =

Greek tennis player

Eleni Daniilidou Ελένη Δανιηλίδου
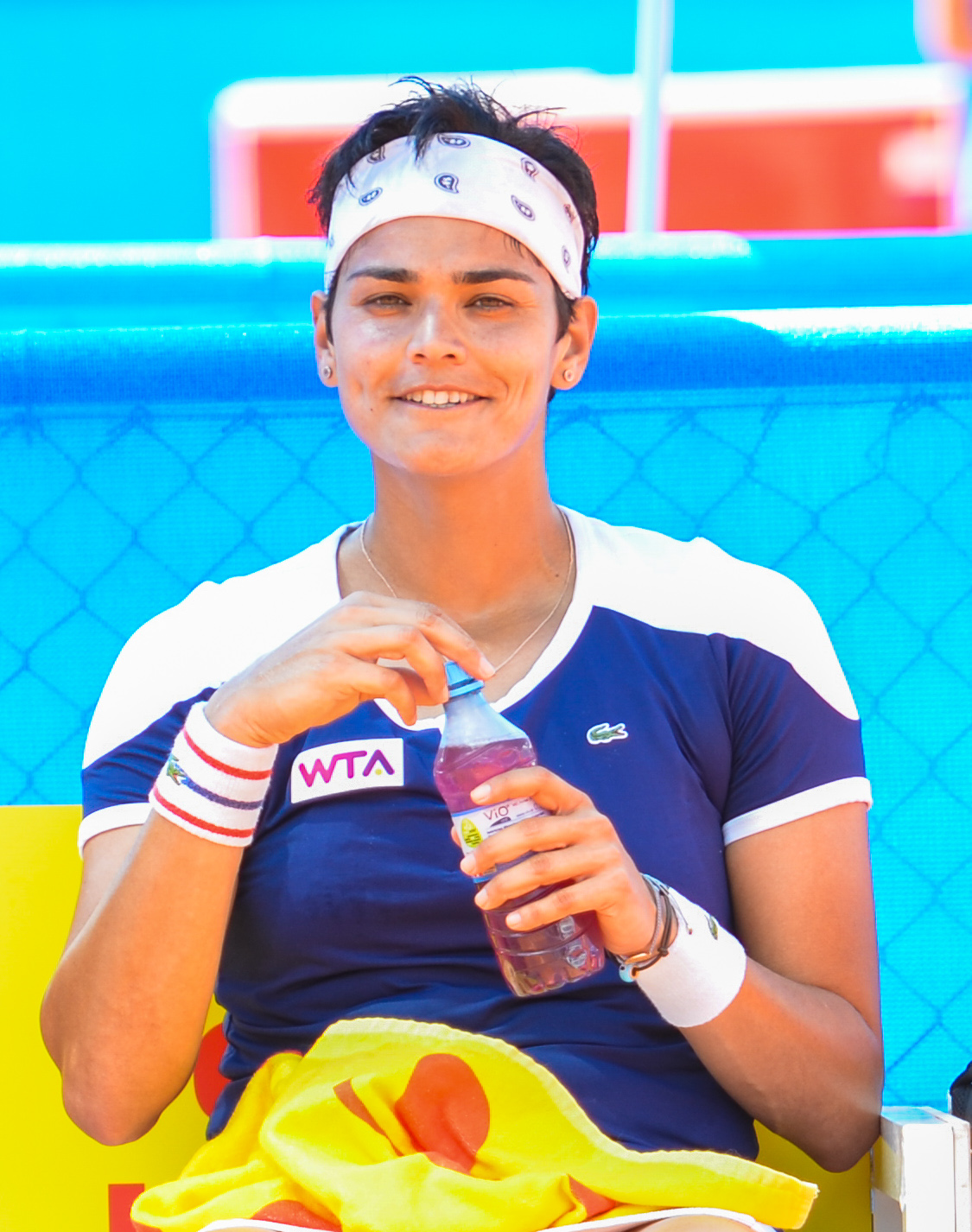
- Daniilidou in 2014
- Country (sports): Greece
- Residence: Thessaloniki
- Born: 19 September 1982 (age 43) Chania, Crete
- Height: 1.82 m (6 ft 0 in)
- Turned pro: 1996
- Plays: Right-handed (one-handed backhand)
- Prize money: US$ 2,929,165

Singles
- Career record: 509–431
- Career titles: 5
- Highest ranking: No. 14 (12 May 2003)

Grand Slam singles results
- Australian Open: 4R (2003)
- French Open: 3R (2003)
- Wimbledon: 4R (2002)
- US Open: 4R (2004)

Doubles
- Career record: 298–277
- Career titles: 3
- Highest ranking: No. 21 (29 January 2007)

Grand Slam doubles results
- Australian Open: QF (2005)
- French Open: SF (2006)
- Wimbledon: QF (2006)
- US Open: 2R (2004, 2007)

Grand Slam mixed doubles results
- Australian Open: F (2003)
- French Open: 1R (2007)
- Wimbledon: 2R (2006)
- US Open: 2R (2003)

Team competitions
- Fed Cup: 29–15

Eleni Daniilidou (Greek: Ελένη Δανιηλίδου; [eleˈni ðaniˈiliðu]; born 19 September 1982) is a Greek former tennis player from the island of Crete.

She is considered one of the best Greek tennis players of the Open Era, winning five singles titles and three doubles titles on the WTA Tour. In 2003, she reached the mixed-doubles final of the Australian Open, making her the first Greek player to have reached a Grand Slam final. Her highest singles ranking is world No. 14, making her the only female tennis player from Greece to have reached the top 20 until Maria Sakkari in February 2020. No male tennis player had achieved this until Stefanos Tsitsipas reached 15th place in August 2018. By beating Justine Henin in the first round of the 2005 Wimbledon Championships, she became the first player to defeat a reigning French Open champion in the first round of Wimbledon.

== Career summary ==
Daniilidou began her professional career in 1996, making the final of her first ITF event, having barely turned 14. She achieved her first ranking in 1998, finishing that year as the world No. 294. In 2001, she broke into the top 100 following a third round appearance at the US Open. 2002 was the best year of Daniilidou's career, finishing it at No. 22 in the world. She won her first WTA career singles title at the Rosmalen Championships, defeating Elena Dementieva in the final; and reached the fourth round of a Grand Slam tournament for the first time at Wimbledon. At the end of the year, she reached her second WTA final at the Brasil Open, beating Monica Seles en route, but lost to Anastasia Myskina.

Daniilidou started 2003 by winning her second WTA title at the Auckland Open and reaching the fourth round of the Australian Open, results which saw her break into the top 20 for the first time, reaching a career high of No. 14 after the German Open. She also reached the semifinals of the Paris Indoors and the DFS Classic. Daniilidou successfully defended her title at Auckland in 2004, her third WTA singles title. She reached the semifinals at the prestigious Miami Open, beating Jennifer Capriati en route. Later that year she equalled her best Grand Slam performance at the US Open by reaching the fourth round.

2005 was a relatively poor year for Daniilidou, becoming the first since 2001 where she did not win a title. She did, however, cause a huge upset at Wimbledon, beating the reigning French Open champion, Justine Henin. It was the first time the French Open champion had ever lost in the first round of Wimbledon. It also brought the end of Henin's 24-match win streak dating back to the beginning of the clay season. Daniilidou eventually lost in the third round, her best Grand Slam performance of the year. She also reached the semifinals of a lower level WTA event in Portorož, Slovenia. She recovered slightly in 2006, going back into the top 50 and winning her fourth WTA singles title at the Korea Open. She also reached the semifinals of the Ordina Open, and remained in the top 50 in 2007 with her best result being a semifinal at the Connecticut Open, where she beat Dinara Safina in the quarterfinals after saving a match point.

2008 was an injury-plagued season for Daniilidou, missing almost half the year with a right knee injury. She won her fifth and last WTA singles title at the Hobart International, but missed several months of events from March. She returned at the Summer Olympics in August but failed to win a match for the rest of the season, ultimately finishing the year outside the top 100 for the first time since 2000.

== Performance timelines ==
Key
W	F	SF	QF	#R	RR	Q#	P#	DNQ	A	Z#	PO	G	S	B	NMS	NTI	P	NH

(W) winner; (F) finalist; (SF) semifinalist; (QF) quarterfinalist; (#R) rounds 4, 3, 2, 1; (RR) round-robin stage; (Q#) qualification round; (P#) preliminary round; (DNQ) did not qualify; (A) absent; (Z#) Davis/Fed Cup Zonal Group (with number indication) or (PO) play-off; (G) gold, (S) silver or (B) bronze Olympic/Paralympic medal; (NMS) not a Masters tournament; (NTI) not a Tier I tournament; (P) postponed; (NH) not held; (SR) strike rate (events won / competed); (W–L) win–loss record.
To avoid confusion and double counting, these charts are updated at the conclusion of a tournament or when the player's participation has ended.

Only main-draw results in WTA Tour, Grand Slam tournaments, Fed Cup and Olympic Games are included in win–loss records.

=== Singles ===
Tournament	1999	2000	2001	2002	2003	2004	2005	2006	2007	2008	2009	2010	2011	2012	2013	2014	SR	W–L	Win%
Grand Slam tournaments
Australian Open	A	A	A	3R	4R	3R	1R	1R	1R	1R	Q2	Q2	Q2	2R	2R	Q1	0 / 9	9–9	50%
French Open	A	A	Q3	2R	3R	1R	1R	1R	1R	A	A	Q1	1R	1R	Q2	A	0 / 8	3–8	27%
Wimbledon	A	A	2R	4R	2R	1R	3R	1R	2R	A	A	1R	2R	1R	Q2	A	0 / 10	10–10	50%
US Open	A	A	3R	1R	1R	4R	1R	2R	2R	1R	A	Q1	1R	1R	1R	A	0 / 11	7–11	39%
Win–loss	0–0	0–0	3–2	6–4	7–4	5–4	2–4	1–4	2–4	0–2	0–0	0–1	1–3	1–4	1–2	0–0	0 / 38	29–38	43%
National representation
Summer Olympics	NH	1R	NH			3R	NH			1R	NH			A	NH		0 / 3	2–3	40%
WTA Premier Mandatory & 5 + former
Dubai / Qatar Open (Note: The first Premier 5 event of the year has switched back and forth between the Dubai Tennis Championships and the Qatar Total Open since 2009. Dubai was classified as a Premier 5 event from 2009 to 2011 before being succeeded by Doha for the 2012–2014 period. In 2015, Dubai regained its Premier 5 status while Doha was demoted to Premier status. The Premier 5 tournaments were reclassified as WTA 1000 tournaments in 2021.)	NH/NMS									1R	A	A	A	Q1	1R	A	0 / 2	0–2	0%
Indian Wells Open	A	A	A	2R	3R	2R	A	3R	A	3R	A	1R	A	1R	Q2	A	0 / 7	5–7	42%
Miami Open	A	A	A	2R	3R	SF	2R	4R	1R	1R	A	A	A	1R	Q1	A	0 / 8	10–8	56%
Berlin / Madrid Open (Note: In 2009, the Berlin Open was replaced by the Madrid Open. The Premier Mandatory tournaments were reclassified as WTA 1000 tournaments in 2021.)	A	A	A	1R	3R	2R	2R	1R	1R	A	A	A	A	Q1	A	A	0 / 6	4–6	40%
Italian Open	A	A	A	A	2R	A	A	A	1R	A	A	A	Q1	A	A	A	0 / 2	1–2	33%
Canadian Open	A	A	A	1R	1R	A	A	A	3R	A	A	A	A	Q1	A	A	0 / 3	2–3	40%
Cincinnati Open	NMS										A	A	1R	2R	A	A	0 / 2	1–2	33%
Pan Pacific Open	A	A	A	A	A	A	A	A	A	A	A	A	A	Q2	A	A	0 / 0	0–0	–
China Open	NH/NMS										A	A	1R	Q1	A	A	0 / 1	0–1	0%
Charleston Open (former)	A	A	A	A	A	1R	1R	A	2R	A	NMS						0 / 3	1–3	25%
San Diego Open (former)	A	A	A	A	A	2R	1R	A	2R	A	NH						0 / 3	2–3	40%
Kremlin Cup (former)	A	A	A	1R	QF	A	A	A	1R	A	NMS						0 / 3	2–3	40%
Zurich Open (former)	A	A	A	Q1	1R	Q2	Q1	A	1R	NH/NMS							0 / 2	0–2	0%
Win–loss	0–0	0–0	0–0	2–5	7–7	6–5	2–4	5–3	4–8	1–3	0–0	0–1	0–2	1–3	0–1	0–0	0 / 42	28–42	40%
Career statistics
Tournament	1999	2000	2001	2002	2003	2004	2005	2006	2007	2008	2009	2010	2011	2012	2013	2014	SR	W–L	Win%
Tournaments	0 (Note: During the season, she did not play in the main-draw of any WTA Tour-level tournaments. However, she played at the Fed Cup that is not counted as a played tournament but matches counted.)	1	8	23	24	20	20	25	29	10	1	3	12	21	10	2	Career total: 209		
Titles	0	0	0	1	1	1	0	1	0	1	0	0	0	0	0	0	Career total: 5		
Finals	0	0	0	2	1	1	0	1	0	1	0	0	0	0	0	0	Career total: 6		
Hard win–loss	0–0	0–1	3–3	14–11	17–13	21–12	7–12	20–15	19–18	6–8	4–1	2–2	5–11	7–13	3–9	0–1	4 / 130	128–130	50%
Clay win–loss	1–3	0–0	3–4	8–9	6–5	4–5	2–5	3–6	4–7	0–0	0–0	2–1	1–3	1–5	0–1	0–0	0 / 46	35–54	39%
Grass win–loss	0–0	0–0	2–2	11–2	4–3	0–2	5–2	4–3	4–3	0–0	0–0	0–1	1–1	0–3	0–0	0–1	1 / 24	31–23	57%
Carpet win–loss	0–0	0–0	0–0	0–2	5–3	0–1	0–1	0–0	0–1	1–1	0–0	0–0	0–0	0–0	0–0	0–0	0 / 9	6–9	40%
Overall win–loss	1–3	0–1	8–9	33–24	32–24	25–20	14–20	27–24	27–29	7–9	4–1	4–4	7–15	8–21	3–10	0–2	5 / 209	200–216	48%
Year-end ranking	318	320	84	22	26	34	70	36	43	149	160	167	90	100	189	386	$2,929,165		

=== Doubles ===
Tournament	1998	1999	2000	2001	2002	2003	2004	2005	2006	2007	2008	2009	2010	2011	2012	2013	2014	2015	SR	W–L	Win%
Grand Slam tournaments
Australian Open	A	A	A	A	3R	1R	1R	QF	1R	3R	1R	A	A	2R	1R	1R	A	A	0 / 10	7–10	41%
French Open	A	A	A	A	A	3R	1R	1R	SF	2R	A	A	1R	1R	2R	A	A	A	0 / 8	8–8	50%
Wimbledon	A	A	A	Q2	A	1R	1R	2R	QF	2R	A	A	1R	1R	1R	A	1R	A	0 / 9	5–9	36%
US Open	A	A	A	A	A	1R	2R	1R	A	2R	1R	A	1R	2R	1R	1R	A	A	0 / 9	3–9	25%
Win–loss	0–0	0–0	0–0	0–0	1–1	2–4	1–4	4–4	7–3	5–4	0–2	0–0	0–3	2–4	1–4	0–2	0–1	0–0	0 / 36	23–36	39%
National representation
Summer Olympics	NH		A	NH			1R	NH			1R	NH			A	NH			0 / 2	0–2	0%
WTA Premier Mandatory & 5 + former
Dubai / Qatar Open	NH/NMS										1R	A	A	A	1R	2R	A	A	0 / 3	1–3	25%
Indian Wells Open	A	A	A	A	A	A	2R	1R	SF	A	2R	A	A	A	1R	A	A	A	0 / 5	4–5	44%
Miami Open	A	A	A	A	A	1R	2R	1R	QF	1R	A	A	A	A	A	A	A	A	0 / 5	3–5	38%
Berlin / Madrid Open	A	A	A	A	A	A	A	1R	QF	1R	A	A	A	A	A	A	A	A	0 / 3	2–3	40%
Italian Open	A	A	A	A	A	A	A	A	A	1R	A	A	A	1R	A	A	A	A	0 / 2	0–2	0%
Canadian Open	A	A	A	A	A	2R	A	A	A	1R	A	A	A	1R	1R	A	A	A	0 / 4	1–4	20%
Cincinnati Open	NMS											A	A	2R	QF	A	A	A	0 / 2	3–2	60%
Pan Pacific Open	A	A	A	A	A	A	A	A	A	A	A	A	A	A	A	A	A	A	0 / 0	0–0	–
China Open	A	A	A	A	A	A	A	A	A	A	A	A	A	1R	A	A	A	A	0 / 1	0–1	0%
Charleston Open (former)	A	A	A	A	A	A	1R	1R	A	1R	A	NMS							0 / 3	0–3	0%
San Diego Open (former)	NMS						QF	2R	A	1R	A	NH							0 / 3	2–3	40%
Kremlin Cup (former)	A	A	A	A	A	1R	A	A	A	1R	A	NMS							0 / 2	0–2	0%
Zurich Open (former)	A	A	A	A	A	A	A	1R	1R	A	NH/NMS								0 / 2	0–2	0%
Win–loss	0–0	0–0	0–0	0–0	0–0	1–3	3–4	1–6	6–4	0–7	1–2	0–0	0–0	1–4	2–4	1–1	0–0	0–0	0 / 35	16–35	31%
Career statistics
Tournament	1998	1999	2000	2001	2002	2003	2004	2005	2006	2007	2008	2009	2010	2011	2012	2013	2014	2015	SR	W–L	Win%
Tournaments	0	1	3	7	11	18	19	21	24	30	8	5	13	21	17	11	7	0	Career total: 216		
Titles	0	0	0	0	0	0	1	0	0	0	0	0	1	1	0	0	0	0	Career total: 3		
Finals	0	0	0	0	0	1	2	1	1	1	1	0	1	2	0	2	0	0	Career total: 12		
Hard win–loss	0–0	0–0	0–0	0–2	4–3	3–10	13–11	9–13	15–14	10–19	5–7	5–1	8–6	12–11	6–10	10–7	2–2	0–0	3 / 125	102–116	47%
Clay win–loss	3–1	0–0	2–1	3–4	3–5	5–3	2–6	1–5	10–6	1–3	0–0	1–3	0–5	6–8	1–3	3–1	3–3	2–0	0 / 58	46–57	45%
Grass win–loss	0–0	0–0	0–0	1–1	1–1	0–2	1–1	4–3	3–3	4–5	0–0	0–1	0–1	0–1	0–2	0–1	1–2	0–0	0 / 22	15–24	38%
Carpet win–loss	0–0	0–1	0–1	0–0	2–2	3–3	0–1	0–0	0–1	1–1	0–1	0–0	0–0	0–0	0–0	0–0	0–0	0–0	0 / 11	6–10	38%
Overall win–loss	3–1	0–1	2–2	4–7	10–11	11–18	16–19	14–21	28–24	16–28	5–8	6–5	8–12	18–20	7–15	13–9	6–7	2–0	0 / 216	169–207	45%
Year-end ranking	257	330	237	176	95	63	46	50	22	54	169	98	84	60	91	79	135	779			

== Grand Slam finals ==
=== Mixed doubles: 1 (runner-up) ===
Result	Year	Championship	Surface	Partner	Opponents	Score
Loss	2003	Australian Open	Hard	(Australia) Todd Woodbridge	(India) Leander Paes (United States) Martina Navratilova	4–6, 5–7

== WTA career finals ==
=== Singles: 6 (5 titles, 1 runner–up) ===
Legend Grand Slam WTA Premier Mandatory & 5 WTA Premier (0–1) WTA International (5–0)	Finals by surface Hard (4–1) Clay (0–0) Grass (1–0) Carpet (0–0)

Result	W–L	Date	Tournament	Tier	Surface	Opponent	Score
Win	1–0	Jun 2002	Rosmalen Open, Netherlands	Tier III (Note: Includes WTA Premier and WTA International tournaments. The WTA Tier II tournaments were reclassified as WTA Premier tournaments in 2009, while the WTA Tier III tournaments, WTA Tier IV tournaments and WTA Tier V tournaments were reclassified as WTA International tournaments the same year .)	Grass	(Russia) Elena Dementieva	3–6, 6–2, 6–3
Loss	1–1	Sep 2002	Brasil Open, Brazil	Tier II	Hard	(Russia) Anastasia Myskina	3–6, 6–0, 2–6
Win	2–1	Jan 2003	Auckland Open, New Zealand	Tier IV	Hard	(South Korea) Cho Yoon-jeong	6–4, 4–6, 7–6^{(7–2)}
Win	3–1	Jan 2004	Auckland Open, New Zealand (2)	Tier IV	Hard	(United States) Ashley Harkleroad	6–3, 6–2
Win	4–1	Oct 2006	Korea Open, South Korea	Tier IV	Hard	(Japan) Ai Sugiyama	6–3, 2–6, 7–6^{(7–3)}
Win	5–1	Jan 2008	Hobart International, Australia	Tier IV	Hard	(Russia) Vera Zvonareva	walkover

=== Doubles: 12 (3 titles, 9 runner–ups) ===
Legend Grand Slam WTA Premier Mandatory & 5 WTA Premier (1–2) WTA International (2–7)	Finals by surface Hard (3–4) Clay (0–3) Grass (0–1) Carpet (0–1)

Result	W–L	Date	Tournament	Tier	Surface	Partner	Opponents	Score
Loss	0–1	May 2003	Warsaw Open, Poland	Tier II	Clay	(Italy) Francesca Schiavone	(South Africa) Liezel Huber (Bulgaria) Magdalena Maleeva	6–3, 4–6, 2–6
Loss	0–2	Feb 2004	Diamond Games, Belgium	Tier II	Hard	(Switzerland) Myriam Casanova	(Zimbabwe) Cara Black (Belgium) Els Callens	2–6, 1–6
Win	1–2	Jun 2004	Stanford Classic, United States	Tier II	Hard	(Australia) Nicole Pratt	(Luxembourg) Claudine Schaul (Czech Republic) Iveta Benešová	6–2, 6–4
Loss	1–3	Jun 2005	Birmingham Classic, UK	Tier III	Grass	(United States) Jennifer Russell	(Slovakia) Daniela Hantuchová (Japan) Ai Sugiyama	2–6, 3–6
Loss	1–4	Nov 2006	Gaz de France Stars, Belgium	Tier III	Carpet (i)	(Germany) Jasmin Wöhr	(United States) Lisa Raymond (Australia) Samantha Stosur	2–6, 3–6
Loss	1–5	Sep 2007	Korea Open, South Korea	Tier IV	Hard	(Germany) Jasmin Wöhr	(Chinese Taipei) Chuang Chia-jung (Chinese Taipei) Hsieh Su-wei	2–6, 2–6
Loss	1–6	Jan 2008	Hobart International, Australia	Tier IV	Hard	(Germany) Jasmin Wöhr	(Spain) Anabel Medina Garrigues (Spain) Virginia Ruano Pascual	2–6, 4–6
Win	2–6	Jul 2010	İstanbul Cup, Turkey	International	Hard	(Germany) Jasmin Wöhr	(Russia) Maria Kondratieva (Czech Republic) Vladimíra Uhlířová	6–4, 1–6, [11–9]
Loss	2–7	Apr 2011	Estoril Open, Portugal	International	Clay	(Netherlands) Michaëlla Krajicek	(Russia) Alisa Kleybanova (Kazakhstan) Galina Voskoboeva	4–6, 2–6
Win	3–7	Sep 2011	Tashkent Open, Uzbekistan	International	Hard	(Russia) Vitalia Diatchenko	(Ukraine) Lyudmyla Kichenok (Ukraine) Nadiia Kichenok	6–4, 6–3
Loss	3–8	Jul 2013	Gastein Ladies, Austria	International	Clay	(Germany) Kristina Barrois	(Austria) Sandra Klemenschits (Slovenia) Andreja Klepač	1–6, 4–6
Loss	3–9	Jul 2013	Baku Cup, Azerbaijan	International	Hard	(Serbia) Aleksandra Krunić	(Ukraine) Irina Buryachok (Georgia (country)) Oksana Kalashnikova	4–6, 7–6^{(7–3)}, [10–4]

== ITF Circuit finals ==
Legend
$100,000 tournaments
$80,000 tournaments
$60,000 tournaments
$25,000 tournaments
$15,000 tournaments
$10,000 tournaments

=== Singles: 16 (11 titles, 5 runner-ups) ===
Result	W–L	Date	Tournament	Tier	Surface	Opponent	Score
Loss	0–1	Sep 1996	ITF Thessaloniki, Greece	10,000	Hard	(Hungary) Nóra Köves	3–6, 2–6
Win	1–1	Aug 1998	ITF Southsea, Great Britain	10,000	Grass	(India) Manisha Malhotra	7–6^{(7–5)}, 6–3
Win	2–1	Aug 1998	ITF İstanbul, Turkey	10,000	Hard	(Japan) Riei Kawamata	6–0, 6–1
Win	3–1	Aug 1998	ITF Skiathos, Greece	10,000	Carpet	(Belarus) Tatiana Poutchek	6–3, 6–4
Win	4–1	Aug 1998	ITF Xanthi, Greece	10,000	Hard	(United Kingdom) Lizzie Jelfs	6–2, 6–0
Win	5–1	Sep 1999	ITF Thessaloniki, Greece	25,000	Carpet	(Argentina) Clarisa Fernández	6–2, 6–2
Win	6–1	Aug 2000	ITF Kastoria, Greece	10,000	Carpet	(Netherlands) Jolanda Mens	6–3, 6–1
Win	7–1	Apr 2001	ITF Dubai, United Arab Emirates	75,000 (Note: The $75,000 ITF tournaments were reclassified as $75,000 in 2017.)	Hard	(Hungary) Anikó Kapros	6–4, 6–4
Win	8–1	Apr 2001	ITF Taranto, Italy	25,000	Clay	(United States) Edina Gallovits-Hall	7–5, 6–2
Loss	8–2	Feb 2009	ITF Midland, United States	75,000	Hard (i)	(Czech Republic) Lucie Hradecká	3–6, 3–6
Loss	8–3	Aug 2009	ITF Westende, Belgium	25,000	Hard	(France) Estelle Guisard	1–6, 2–6
Loss	8–4	Sep 2009	ITF Athens, Greece	100,000	Hard	(Australia) Jelena Dokic	2–6, 1–6
Win	9–4	Oct 2010	ITF Athens, Greece	50,000 (Note: The $50,000 ITF tournaments were reclassified as $60,000 in 2017.)	Hard	(Spain) Laura Pous Tió	6–4, 6–1
Win	10–4	May 2011	ITF Nottingham, Great Britain	75,000	Grass	(Belarus) Olga Govortsova	1–6, 6–4, 6–2
Win	11–4	Jul 2011	ITF Pozoblanco, Spain	50,000	Hard	(Bulgaria) Elitsa Kostova	6–3, 6–2
Loss	11–5	Oct 2012	ITF Barnstaple, Great Britain	75,000	Hard (i)	(Germany) Annika Beck	7–6^{(7–1)}, 2–6, 2–6

=== Doubles: 29 (16 titles, 13 runner-ups) ===
Result	W–L	Date	Tournament	Tier	Surface	Partner	Opponents	Score
Loss	0–1	Aug 1998	ITF Southsea, Great Britain	10,000	Grass	(United Kingdom) Lucy Wood	(United Kingdom) Lizzie Jelfs (South Africa) Mareze Joubert	2–6, 3–6
Win	1–1	Aug 1998	ITF İstanbul, Turkey	10,000	Hard	(Israel) Nataly Cahana	(Turkey) Duygu Akşit Oal (Turkey) Gülberk Gültekin	3–6, 6–3, 6–3
Win	2–1	Aug 1998	ITF Skiathos, Greece	10,000	Carpet	(Greece) Evagelia Roussi	(North Macedonia) Marina Lazarovska (Belarus) Tatiana Poutchek	3–6, 6–4, 6–2
Win	3–1	Aug 1998	ITF Xanthi, Greece	10,000	Hard	(Greece) Evagelia Roussi	(Federal Republic of Yugoslavia) Dragana Ilić (Federal Republic of Yugoslavia) Ljiljana Nanušević	6–0, 6–3
Win	4–1	Sep 1998	ITF Thessaloniki, Greece	25,000	Clay	(Greece) Christína Papadáki	(Slovakia) Ľudmila Cervanová (Germany) Magdalena Kučerová	7–6^{(7–5)}, 4–6, 7–5
Win	5–1	Sep 1999	ITF Thessaloniki	25,000	Carpet	(South Africa) Surina De Beer	(Germany) Adriana Barna (Hungary) Adrienn Hegedűs	6–2, 6–3
Win	6–1	Aug 2000	ITF Kastoria, Greece	10,000	Carpet	(Greece) Evagelia Roussi	(Austria) Sandra Klemenschits (Austria) Daniela Klemenschits	6–3, 6–4
Loss	6–2	Sep 2000	ITF Fano, Italy	25,000	Clay	(Spain) Alicia Ortuño	(Spain) Rosa María Andrés Rodríguez (Spain) Conchita Martínez Granados	2–6, 4–6
Win	7–2	Oct 2000	ITF Joué-lès-Tours, France	25,000	Hard (i)	(Bulgaria) Maria Geznenge	(Germany) Mia Buric (Italy) Laura Dell'Angelo	5–3, 4–1, 4–0
Loss	7–3	Jan 2001	ITF Tipton, Great Britain	10,000	Hard (i)	(Bulgaria) Maria Geznenge	(United Kingdom) Helen Crook (United Kingdom) Victoria Davies	6–2, 4–6, 4–6
Win	8–3	Feb 2001	ITF Sutton, Great Britain	25,000	Hard (i)	(Germany) Lydia Steinbach	(Netherlands) Amanda Hopmans (Belgium) Patty Van Acker	6–0, 6–4
Loss	8–4	Mar 2001	ITF Cholet, France	10,000	Clay (i)	(Italy) Germana Di Natale	(Ukraine) Yuliya Beygelzimer (Australia) Anastasia Rodionova	1–6, 6–7^{(5–7)}
Win	9–4	Apr 2001	ITF Dinan, France	25,000	Clay (i)	(Germany) Caroline Schneider	(Germany) Vanessa Henke (Germany) Syna Schmidle	6–3, 7–6^{(7–4)}
Loss	9–5	Mar 2009	ITF La Palma, Spain	25,000	Hard	(Germany) Jasmin Wöhr	(China) Lu Jingjing (China) Sun Shengnan	2–6, 7–5, [5–10]
Loss	9–6	Jun 2009	ITF Nottingham, UK	75,000	Grass	(Japan) Rika Fujiwara	(United States) Alexa Glatch (South Africa) Natalie Grandin	3–6, 6–2, [7–10]
Win	10–6	Sep 2009	ITF Athens, Greece	100,000	Hard	(Germany) Jasmin Wöhr	(Switzerland) Timea Bacsinszky (Italy) Tathiana Garbin	6–2, 5–7, [10–4]
Win	11–6	Nov 2009	ITF Ismaning, Germany	50,000	Carpet (i)	(Germany) Jasmin Wöhr	(Belarus) Ekaterina Dzehalevich (Czech Republic) Eva Hrdinová	6–2, 4–6, [10–5]
Win	12–6	Sep 2010	ITF Sofia, Bulgaria	100,000	Hard	(Germany) Jasmin Wöhr	(Austria) Sandra Klemenschits (Germany) Tatjana Maria	6–3, 6–4
Loss	12–7	Oct 2010	ITF Athens, Greece	50,000	Hard	(Croatia) Petra Martić	(Russia) Vitalia Diatchenko (Turkey) İpek Şenoğlu	walkover
Win	13–7	Jun 2012	ITF Nottingham, UK	75,000	Grass	(Australia) Casey Dellacqua	(United Kingdom) Laura Robson (United Kingdom) Heather Watson	6–4, 6–2
Win	14–7	Sep 2013	ITF Albuquerque, United States	75,000	Hard	(United States) CoCo Vandeweghe	(United States) Melanie Oudin (United States) Taylor Townsend	6–4, 7–6^{(7–2)}
Loss	14–8	Dec 2013	ITF Ankara, Turkey	50,000	Hard	(Serbia) Aleksandra Krunić	(Ukraine) Yuliya Beygelzimer (Turkey) Çağla Büyükakçay	3–6, 3–6
Loss	14–9	Mar 2014	ITF Croissy-Beaubourg, France	50,000	Hard (i)	(Germany) Kristina Barrois	(Russia) Margarita Gasparyan (Ukraine) Lyudmyla Kichenok	2–6, 4–6
Loss	14–10	May 2014	ITF Fukuoka, Japan	50,000	Grass	(United Kingdom) Naomi Broady	(Japan) Shuko Aoyama (Japan) Eri Hozumi	3–6, 4–6
Win	15–10	Mar 2015	ITF Amiens, France	10,000	Clay	(Hungary) Ilka Csöregi	(Ukraine) Elizaveta Ianchuk (Ukraine) Olga Ianchuk	6–1, 6–4
Loss	15–11	Feb 2016	ITF Antalya	10,000	Clay	(Uzbekistan) Arina Folts	(Bulgaria) Petia Arshinkova (Romania) Elena Gabriela Ruse	6–7^{(0–7)}, 4–6
Loss	15–12	Apr 2016	ITF Manisa, Turkey	10,000	Hard	(Russia) Margarita Lazareva	(Australia) Abbie Myers (Turkey) Melis Sezer	4–6, 4–6
Win	16–12	Jul 2016	ITF Imola, Italy	25,000	Carpet	(Switzerland) Lisa Sabino	(Italy) Martina Di Giuseppe (Italy) Maria Masini	4–6, 6–2, [10–4]
Loss	16–13	Mar 2017	ITF İstanbul	15,000	Hard (i)	(Israel) Vlada Ekshibarova	(Russia) Ekaterina Kazionova (Russia) Elena Rybakina	1–6, 3–6

== Best Grand Slam results details ==
=== Singles ===
	Australian Open			
2003 Australian Open (18th seed)
Round	Opponent	Rank	Score	EDR
1R	(United States) Marissa Irvin	No. 79	7–6^{(8–6)}, 6–3	No. 20
2R	(United States) Amy Frazier	No. 40	6–1, 6–2	No. 20
3R	(France) Nathalie Dechy (16)	No. 18	6–4, 6–3	No. 20
4R	(United States) Serena Williams (1)	No. 1	4–6, 1–6	No. 20

	French Open			
2003 French Open (14th seed)
Round	Opponent	Rank	Score	EDR
1R	(Australia) Nicole Pratt	No. 53	6–4, 6–3	No. 14
2R	(Italy) Tathiana Garbin	No. 95	6–0, 4–6, 6–2	No. 14
3R	(Switzerland) Patty Schnyder (19)	No. 18	3–6, 4–6	No. 14

	Wimbledon Championships			
2002 Wimbledon
Round	Opponent	Rank	Score	EDR
1R	(Croatia) Jelena Kostanić	No. 64	6–2, 6–3	No. 38
2R	(Japan) Saori Obata	No. 116	6–2, 6–2	No. 38
3R	(Netherlands) Miriam Oremans	No. 129	7–6^{(7–5)}, 6–4	No. 38
4R	(United States) Jennifer Capriati (3)	No. 3	1–6, 6–3, 1–6	No. 38

	US Open			
2004 US Open (29th seed)
Round	Opponent	Rank	Score	EDR
1R	(Croatia) Silvija Talaja	No. 108	3–6, 6–3, 7–5	No. 33
2R	(Spain) Anabel Medina Garrigues	No. 45	1–6, 7–5, 6–4	No. 33
3R	(Russia) Anna Chakvetadze (Q)	No. 175	6–2, 6–4	No. 33
4R	(Japan) Shinobu Asagoe	No. 62	6–7^{(4–7)}, 6–4, 3–6	No. 33

== Head-to-head records ==
- Serena Williams: 0–8
- Venus Williams: 0–2
- Kim Clijsters: 0–2
- Lindsay Davenport: 0–3
- Jelena Janković: 0–1
- Nadia Petrova: 1–3
- Dinara Safina: 2–2
- Justine Henin: 2–2
- Maria Sharapova: 0–5

=== Top-10 wins ===
Daniilidou has won 7 matches against players who were, at the time the match was played, ranked in the top 10.

#	Player	Rank	Event	Surface	Rd	Score	EDR
2002
1	(Belgium) Justine Henin	No. 7	Rosmalen Championships, Netherlands	Grass	SF	4–6, 7–6^{(11–9)}, 6–3	No. 51
2	(United States) Monica Seles	No. 5	Brazil Cup, Brazil	Hard	SF	6–1, 7–5	No. 34
2003
3	(Federal Republic of Yugoslavia) Jelena Dokić	No. 10	Paris Indoor, France	Carpet (i)	QF	6–1, 6–3	No. 18
2004
4	(United States) Jennifer Capriati	No. 5	Dubai Championships, UAE	Hard	2R	6–4, 7–6^{(7–2)}	No. 35
5	(United States) Jennifer Capriati	No. 7	Miami Open, United States	Hard	3R	6–2, 6–4	No. 35
2005
6	(Belgium) Justine Henin-Hardenne	No. 7	Wimbledon, United Kingdom	Grass	1R	7–6^{(8–6)}, 2–6, 7–5	No. 76
7	(Russia) Svetlana Kuznetsova	No. 4	LA Championships, United States	Hard	R32	6–4, 6–4	No. 63

== Longest winning streaks ==
=== 8–match singles winning streak (2002) ===
#	Tournament	Category	Start date	Surface	Rd	Opponent	Rank	Score	EDR
–	Birmingham Classic, United Kingdom	Tier III	10 June 2002	Grass	QF	(Federal Republic of Yugoslavia) Jelena Dokic (1)	No. 8	4–6, 6–4, 4–6	No. 54
1	Ordina Open, Netherlands	Tier III	17 June 2002	Grass	1R	(Belarus) Tatiana Poutchek	No. 64	7–6^{(7–2)}, 6–0	No. 51
2	Ordina Open, Netherlands	Tier III	17 June 2002	Grass	2R	(Spain) Cristina Torrens Valero (6)	No. 39	6–2, 6–2	No. 51
3	Ordina Open, Netherlands	Tier III	17 June 2002	Grass	QF	(France) Amélie Mauresmo (3)	No. 11	6–4, 6–4	No. 51
4	Ordina Open, Netherlands	Tier III	17 June 2002	Grass	SF	(Belgium) Justine Henin (2)	No. 7	4–6, 7–6^{(11–9)}, 6–3	No. 51
5	Ordina Open, Netherlands	Tier III	17 June 2002	Grass	F	(Russia) Elena Dementieva (4)	No. 14	3–6, 6–2, 6–3	No. 51
6	Wimbledon, United Kingdom	Grand Slam	24 June 2002	Grass	1R	(Croatia) Jelena Kostanić	No. 64	6–2, 6–3	No. 38
7	Wimbledon, United Kingdom	Grand Slam	24 June 2002	Grass	2R	(Japan) Saori Obata	No. 116	6–2, 6–2	No. 38
8	Wimbledon, United Kingdom	Grand Slam	24 June 2002	Grass	3R	(Netherlands) Miriam Oremans	No. 129	7–6^{(7–5)}, 6–4	No. 38
–	Wimbledon, United Kingdom	Grand Slam	24 June 2002	Grass	4R	(United States) Jennifer Capriati (3)	No. 3	1–6, 6–3, 1–6	No. 38
