= 2002 WTA Brasil Open – Doubles =

Doubles
- 2002 WTA Brasil Open

Final
- Champions: (Spain) Virginia Ruano Pascual (Argentina) Paola Suárez
- Runners-up: (France) Émilie Loit (Paraguay) Rossana de los Ríos
- Score: 6–4, 6–1

Details
- Draw: 16
- Seeds: 4

Events
Singles	Doubles
- WTA Brasil Open

Amanda Coetzer and Lori McNeil were the defending champions, but none competed this year.

Virginia Ruano Pascual and Paola Suárez won the title, defeating Émilie Loit and Rossana de los Ríos 6–4, 6–1 in the final. It was the 17th title for Ruano Pascual and the 25th title for Suárez in their respective careers. It was also the 7th title for the pair during this season.

== Seeds ==
1. (Spain) Virginia Ruano Pascual / (Argentina) Paola Suárez (champions)
2. (Slovenia) Tina Križan / (Slovenia) Katarina Srebotnik (quarterfinals)
3. (France) Nathalie Dechy / (Slovakia) Janette Husárová (first round)
4. (United States) Meghann Shaughnessy / (Uzbekistan) Iroda Tulyaganova (semifinals)

== Draw ==
Key

- Q = Qualifier
- WC = Wild card
- LL = Lucky loser
- Alt = Alternate
- ITF = ITF entry
- PR = Protected ranking
- SR = Special ranking
- SE = Special exempt
- JE = Junior exempt
- JR = Junior Accelerator Programme entrant
- CO = College Accelerator Programme entrant
- NG = Next Gen Accelerator Program entrant
- w/o = Walkover
- r = Retired
- d = Defaulted

=== Draw ===
First round
1	(Spain) V Ruano Pascual (Argentina) P Suárez	7	6
(Croatia) I Majoli (Slovakia) H Nagyová	5	0
(Argentina) L Montalvo (Ukraine) E Tatarkova	6	6
(Germany) A Glass (Switzerland) P Schnyder	3	4
3	(France) N Dechy (Slovakia) J Husárová	2	3
(Russia) T Panova (Belarus) T Poutchek	6	6
(Russia) A Myskina (Russia) A Rodionova	5	4
(Greece) E Daniilidou (Federal Republic of Yugoslavia) J Dokic	7	6
(Italy) T Garbin (Hungary) K Marosi	1	5
(Argentina) ME Salerni (Sweden) Å Svensson	6	7
WC	(Brazil) B Colósio (Brazil) V Menga	2	1
4	(United States) M Shaughnessy (Uzbekistan) I Tulyaganova	6	6
(France) É Loit (Paraguay) R de los Ríos	6	4	6
(France) C Dhenin (Slovenia) M Matevžič	4	6	3
Q	(Brazil) MF Alves (Brazil) C Tiene	0	2
2	(Slovenia) T Križan (Slovenia) K Srebotnik	6	6

Quarterfinals
1	(Spain) V Ruano Pascual (Argentina) P Suárez	6	6
(Argentina) L Montalvo (Ukraine) E Tatarkova	2	0
(Russia) T Panova (Belarus) T Poutchek	2	3
(Greece) E Daniilidou (Federal Republic of Yugoslavia) J Dokic	6	6
(Argentina) ME Salerni (Sweden) Å Svensson	7	2	3
4	(United States) M Shaughnessy (Uzbekistan) I Tulyaganova	5	6	6
(France) É Loit (Paraguay) R de los Ríos	6	6
2	(Slovenia) T Križan (Slovenia) K Srebotnik	1	3

Semifinals
1	(Spain) V Ruano Pascual (Argentina) P Suárez	w/o
(Greece) E Daniilidou (Federal Republic of Yugoslavia) J Dokic
4	(United States) M Shaughnessy (Uzbekistan) I Tulyaganova	5	6	5
(France) É Loit (Paraguay) R de los Ríos	7	2	7

Final
1	(Spain) V Ruano Pascual (Argentina) P Suárez	6	6
(France) É Loit (Paraguay) R de los Ríos	4	1

== Qualifying ==
=== Seeds ===
1. (Germany) Vanessa Henke / (United States) Brie Rippner (first round)
2. (Argentina) Mariana Díaz Oliva / (Canada) Marie-Ève Pelletier (qualifying competition)

=== Qualifiers ===
1. (Brazil) Maria Fernanda Alves / (Brazil) Carla Tiene

=== Draw ===
First round
1	(Germany) Vanessa Henke (United States) Brie Rippner	6
(Brazil) Maria Fernanda Alves (Brazil) Carla Tiene	8
WC	(Brazil) Marcela Evangelista (Brazil) Letícia Sobral	3
2	(Argentina) Mariana Díaz Oliva (Canada) Marie-Ève Pelletier	8

Qualifying competition
(Brazil) Maria Fernanda Alves (Brazil) Carla Tiene	6	3	7^{7}
2	(Argentina) Mariana Díaz Oliva (Canada) Marie-Ève Pelletier	2	6	6^{5}
