= 2002 WTA Brasil Open – Singles =

Singles
- 2002 WTA Brasil Open

Final
- Champion: (Russia) Anastasia Myskina
- Runner-up: (Greece) Eleni Daniilidou
- Score: 6–3, 0–6, 6–2

Details
- Draw: 28
- Seeds: 8

Events
Singles	Doubles
- WTA Brasil Open

Monica Seles was the defending champion, but lost in the semifinals to Eleni Daniilidou.

Anastasia Myskina won in the final, beating Daniilidou 6–3, 0–6, 6–2.

== Seeds ==
The top four seeds received a bye into the second round.

1. (Serbia and Montenegro) Jelena Dokić (semifinals)
2. (United States) Monica Seles (semifinals)
3. (Russia) Anastasia Myskina (champion)
4. (Switzerland) Patty Schnyder (quarterfinals)
5. (Croatia) Iva Majoli (second round)
6. (Russia) Tatiana Panova (first round)
7. (France) Nathalie Dechy (second round)
8. (Greece) Eleni Daniilidou (final)

== Draw ==
Key

- Q = Qualifier
- WC = Wild card
- LL = Lucky loser
- Alt = Alternate
- ITF = ITF entry
- PR = Protected ranking
- SR = Special ranking
- SE = Special exempt
- JE = Junior exempt
- JR = Junior Accelerator Programme entrant
- CO = College Accelerator Programme entrant
- NG = Next Gen Accelerator Program entrant
- w/o = Walkover
- r = Retired
- d = Defaulted

=== Finals ===
Semifinals
1	(Serbia and Montenegro) Jelena Dokić	2	4
3	(Russia) Anastasia Myskina	6	6
8	(Greece) Eleni Daniilidou	6	7
2/WC	(United States) Monica Seles	1	5

Final
3	(Russia) Anastasia Myskina	6	0	6
8	(Greece) Eleni Daniilidou	3	6	2

=== Top half ===
First round
(Belarus) T Poutchek	4	6	6^{1}
Q	(Switzerland) M Casanova	6	4	7^{7}
(Slovakia) J Husárová	1	1
(South Africa) A Coetzer	6	6
(United States) M Shaughnessy	4	6	4
7	(France) N Dechy	6	0	6
6	(Russia) T Panova	4	6	0
(Slovenia) M Matevžič	6	1	6
(Spain) C Torrens Valero	6	6
WC	(Brazil) MF Alves	2	1
Q	(United States) S Rao	6	6
Q	(Germany) V Henke	2	3

Second round
1	(Serbia and Montenegro) J Dokić	7^{7}	6
Q	(Switzerland) M Casanova	6^{3}	4
(South Africa) A Coetzer	6	3	6
7	(France) N Dechy	2	6	3
(Slovenia) M Matevžič	4	6	6
(Spain) C Torrens Valero	6	4	1
Q	(United States) S Rao	2	2
3	(Russia) A Myskina	6	6

Quarterfinals
1	(Serbia and Montenegro) J Dokić	6	5	6
(South Africa) A Coetzer	2	7	4
(Slovenia) M Matevžič	5	1
3	(Russia) A Myskina	7	6

Semifinal
1	(Serbia and Montenegro) J Dokić	2	4
3	(Russia) A Myskina	6	6

=== Bottom half ===
First round
(Slovakia) M Suchá	1	4
(Slovenia) K Srebotnik	6	6
(France) É Loit	4	7	6
(Uzbekistan) I Tulyaganova	6	5	2
Q	(Colombia) F Zuluaga	6	3	1
8	(Greece) E Daniilidou	4	6	6
5	(Croatia) I Majoli	6	6
WC	(Brazil) C Tiene	2	1
(Sweden) Å Svensson	4	6	1
(Slovakia) H Nagyová	6	4	6
(Slovenia) T Pisnik	6	6
(Argentina) P Suárez	2	2

Second round
4	(Switzerland) P Schnyder	6	6
(Slovenia) K Srebotnik	2	3
(France) É Loit	6	2	5
8	(Greece) E Daniilidou	4	6	7
5	(Croatia) I Majoli	2	3
(Slovakia) H Nagyová	6	6
(Slovenia) T Pisnik	5	1
2/WC	(United States) M Seles	7	6

Quarterfinals
4	(Switzerland) P Schnyder	6	2	4
8	(Greece) E Daniilidou	2	6	6
(Slovakia) H Nagyová	0	4
2/WC	(United States) M Seles	6	6

Semifinal
8	(Greece) E Daniilidou	6	7
2/WC	(United States) M Seles	1	5
