= Rossana de los Ríos =

Paraguayan tennis player

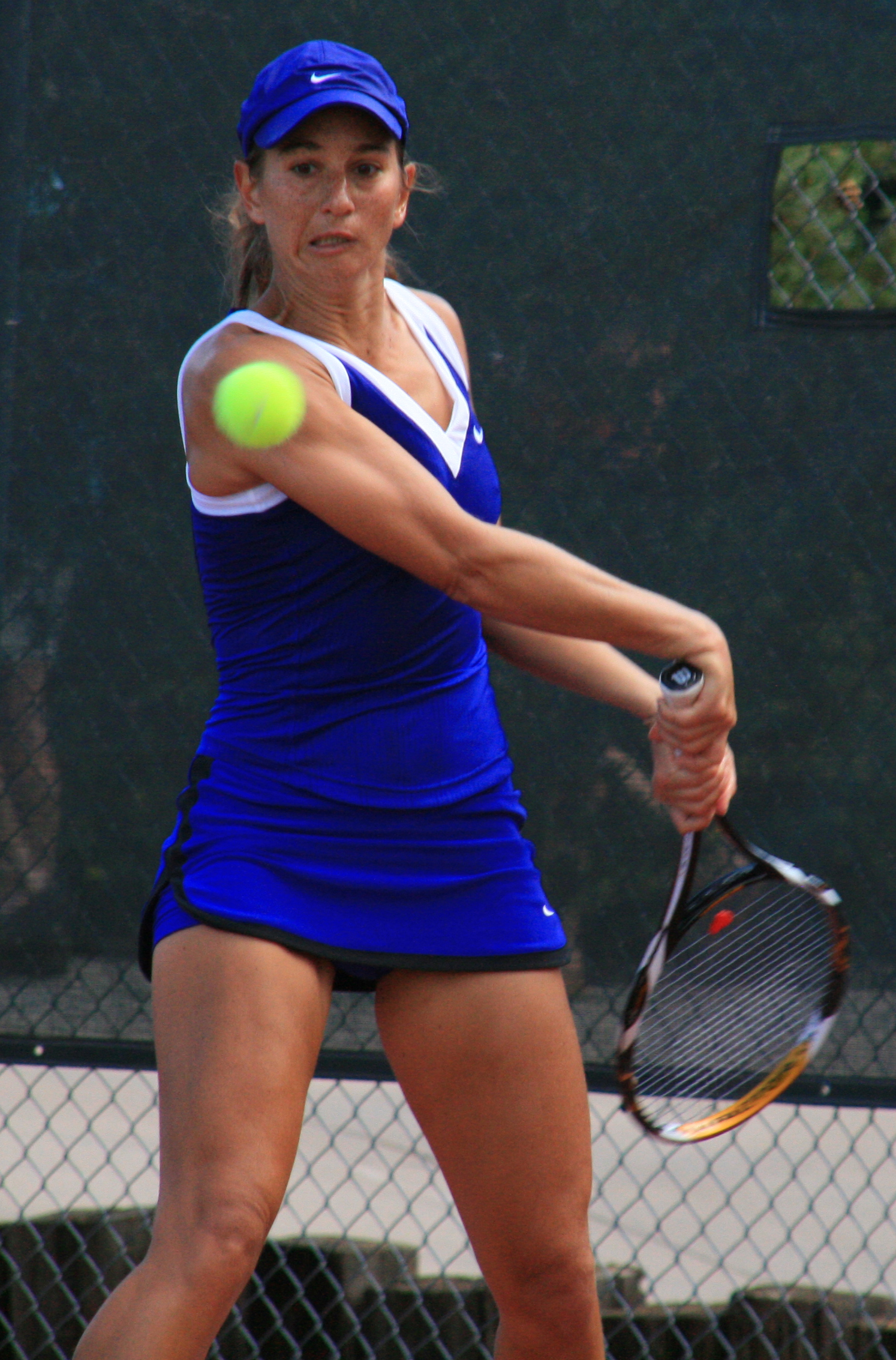
- Rossana de los Rios hitting ball in Albuquerque in 2008
- Full name: Rossana Neffa de los Rios
- Country (sports): Paraguay
- Residence: Miami, United States; Asunción, Paraguay
- Born: 16 September 1975 (age 51) Asunción
- Height: 1.70 m (5 ft 7 in)
- Turned pro: 1989
- Retired: 2010
- Plays: Right-handed (two-handed backhand)
- Prize money: $1,077,550

Singles
- Career record: 447–314
- Career titles: 11 ITF
- Highest ranking: No. 51 (12 November 2001)

Grand Slam singles results
- Australian Open: 2R (2001, 2002)
- French Open: 4R (2000)
- Wimbledon: 2R (2002, 2009)
- US Open: 2R (2002, 2008)

Doubles
- Career record: 119–140
- Career titles: 7 ITF
- Highest ranking: No. 52 (12 May 2003)

Grand Slam doubles results
- Australian Open: 1R (2002, 2003)
- French Open: 2R (2003, 2008)
- Wimbledon: 1R (2002, 2003)
- US Open: 2R (2002)

Rossana Neffa de los Rios (born 16 September 1975) is a former tennis player from Paraguay. She was born in the Paraguayan capital, Asunción, and now resides in Miami, Florida, with her daughter Ana Paula Neffa de los Ríos, who is also a professional tennis player, and her husband Gustavo Neffa, a retired Paraguayan Association football player who played for Boca Juniors. De los Ríos achieved career-high WTA rankings of No. 51 in singles and 52 in doubles. She played doubles with Grand Slam champions such as Maria Sharapova, Svetlana Kuznetsova, Arantxa Sánchez Vicario, as well as Jelena Janković and Dinara Safina. She is also a former world-number-one junior player, having won the 1992 Roland Garros Juniors event. De los Ríos participated in six editions of the Australian Open (1994, 2001, 2002, 2003, 2009 and 2010). She was the only female tennis representative for Paraguay in the 1992 and 2000 Olympic Games. De los Ríos was also in Paraguay's Fed Cup team in 1991 and 1992, and the Pan American team in 1999.

== Career ==
=== 1989–1994 ===
As a 14-year-old, de los Ríos played just three matches, and won the first match of her career on the ITF Circuit in São Paulo. In 1990, she played twelve matches, winning six of them. In May 1991, she won her first ever ITF title, in Francaville, and the next month lost the final in Modena. In September, she won her second ITF title, in Lima, without dropping a set; her win–loss record for the year was 40–18. The following year, she won her third title, in Santa Maria Capua Vetere in October, where she beat Silvia Farina Elia. The following week she reached the final in Asunción, and then the final in Mildura. Her win–loss record for the year was 34–19. As well as being the world number-one junior in 1992 and winning the 1992 Junior French Open, beating Paola Suárez 6–4, 6–0 in the final.

At the 1992 Summer Olympics, she would meet her future partner, Gustavo Neffa, who was at the tournament representing the Paraguay national under-23 football team whilst they were representing Paraguay's tennis team.

In 1993, she made the final in Caserta in June as she turned professional. As the world number 118, she caused a big upset at the Puerto Rican Open by defeating top seed and world No. 30, Brenda Schultz-McCarthy in the first round, finishing the year with 20 wins and 18 losses. In 1994, she only played until April, and won only two of ten matches, before retiring to start a family.

=== 1995–1999 ===
De los Ríos married Gustavo Neffa in 1994, and gave birth to Ana-Paula on January 17, 1997. With the marriage, she suspended her career until 1999-2000 when she returned to the WTA Tour in June 1999, after a five-year absence. In just her fifth tournament back, she won her fifth ITF title, in Buenos Aires, dropping just nine games in five matches. Her win–loss record for the year was 31–9.

=== 2000 ===
The year 2000 was the most successful year on the WTA Tour for de los Ríos. She won 22 out of 29 matches between March and June on the ITF circuit. In June, Rossana easily qualified for the main draw of the French Open, losing just eleven games in three matches. In the main draw, she beat Miroslava Vavrinec in the first round and Marlene Weingartner in the second round, before upsetting the world No. 10, Amanda Coetzer, in three sets. She then fell to fellow qualifier Marta Marrero, the first time two qualifiers met in the fourth round of the French Open. In July, Rossana qualified for Wimbledon but was defeated by Tamarine Tanasugarn. After that, she won only one of her next five matches. Before the 2000 Sydney Olympics, de los Ríos and track athlete Edgar Baumann were left out of the delegation, confirmed by Ramón Zubizarreta, the president of the Paraguayan Olympic Committee. At the Games, she defeated Květa Peschke 6–3, 6–0 in the first round and Lindsay Davenport w/o. Jelena Dokić defeated them in the third round. De los Ríos finished the year with her return to the ITF circuit which saw them win 12 of her next 17 matches, including the finals at Miramar and Pittsburgh. In 2000, she won 45 matches and lost 21.

=== 2001 ===
Did not win two matches back-to-back until Madrid in May. In the first round, she defeated Cristina Torrens Valero 6–1, 6–0, and then recorded her greatest victory to date, with a three-set win over world No. 6 (at the time), Monica Seles.

The Tribune, Chandigarh, India - Sport:

I knew that I could beat Monica, but when I was near victory I was thinking a lot of things, and I had to concentrate very hard to win. This is my most important victory, and I dedicate it to my husband.

She was defeated in the quarterfinals, however. At the French Open in June, Rossana defeated Elena Likhovtseva in the opening round before losing a tight match in the second round to Petra Mandula. She then lost in the first round of Wimbledon to Jelena Dokić. In Knokke-Heist (Tier IV) in July, Rossana defeated world No. 20 (at the time) Silvia Farina Elia 6–3, 6–1 and reached the quarterfinals. Two months later, Rossana recorded her best WTA Tour appearance to date, advancing to the semifinals of Salvador, Bahia (Tier II) including another win over Silvia Farina Elia. Second seed Jelena Dokić put them run to an end. She finished the year with another semifinal in Pattaya City (Tier V), losing to Patty Schnyder in three sets. Her win–loss record finished at 25–28.

On 12 November 2001, she ranked 51.

=== 2002 ===
Advanced to the second round of the Australian Open for the first time in January. Reached the quarterfinals of Bogotá in February. Won just three of her next 13 matches until the French Open in June, where she recorded a third-round appearance but fell to Elena Dementieva. Advanced to the second round of Wimbledon but was defeated at the hands of Monica Seles. In September, Rossana reached the quarterfinals of Bali (Tier III) by upsetting top seed Tamarine Tanasugarn. She was then defeated by Conchita Martínez in straight sets. In Bratislava (Tier V), Rossana stunned Francesca Schiavone in straight sets and reached the quarterfinals. She led Slovenian Maja Matevžič 6–1, 5–2 but bowed out 6–1, 5–7, 1–6. She won 21 matches in total during the year, and lost 30.

=== 2003 ===
Rossana had a disappointing 2003 season. She did not reach the quarterfinals or better in any WTA Tour tournament, but on the ITF Circuit she did manage to advance to the semifinals of Troy in October. She lost in the opening rounds of the Australian Open and the French Open, and was defeated 6–0, 6–0 by Kim Clijsters in the first round at Wimbledon. She won 29 matches (18 of which were in qualifying) and lost 29 matches. In 2003, de los Ríos ranked 52 in doubles.

=== 2004–2005 and injuries ===
In 2004, Rossana did not compete in any WTA or ITF tournament until May due to injury. She won two matches in qualifying for the French Open in just her second tournament of the year, but lost in the final round. The following week she made the semifinals of Allentown on the ITF Circuit, as well as the final of College Park in July. She lost in the first round of qualification at the US Open in September, but rebounded with a semifinal at Ashburn on the ITF Circuit and more impressively, qualified for Philadelphia (Tier II) and reached the second round before being defeated by Anastasia Myskina. She won 19 matches during the year and lost a total of 13.

Things began well for Rossana in 2005, starting with a semifinal appearance in Waikoloa. However, a knee injury kept them out of play from February to October. Upon them return to the ITF Circuit, Rossana had fallen over 100 positions on the WTA rankings- from No. 186 to 289. In her return tournament, she impressively reached the semifinals of Pelham, Alabama. In October, she reached the quarterfinals of San Francisco. She won nine matches out of 16 for the year.

=== 2006 ===
Was Rossana's second most successful year on the WTA Tour. Although she won just five of her first nine matches, it was Indian Harbour Beach in May which saw Rossana reach her first ITF final since College Park in 2004. Ranked as low as No. 452, she came through in qualifying, winning seven consecutive matches en route to the final. She was defeated by Edina Gallovits despite Rossana leading 5–0 in the final set and having six match points. Despite the loss, next week Rossana went on to reach the final in Palm Beach Gardens, beating the eighth, fourth and second seeds, respectively, before losing in the final. In July, she qualified for Cincinnati (Tier III) but lost to world No. 26 (at the time) Katarina Srebotnik, after serving for the set at 5–3 in the second set. She reached the quarterfinals in Lexington, Kentucky later in the month, but lost to Stéphanie Dubois, despite leading 4–2 in the final set. She fell in the first round qualifying of the US Open to Erika Takao, in what was her first Grand Slam qualifying match in two years.

In November, she recorded her worst loss of the year in qualifying for Pittsburgh, but reversed it the next week with an impressive win over sixth seed Aleksandra Wozniak, to record her best win of the year. She went on to reach the semifinals. Two weeks later in December, de los Ríos claimed her first ITF title since 1999, winning the Santaluz Club Open tournament in San Diego, United States, beating sixth seed Ivana Abramović 6–0, 6–2 in the final. The win for Rossana encouraged them to compete in Australia in 2007, and resurrected her ranking to just outside the top 200.

She climbed 117 ranking positions in the year, from No. 386 to No. 209 in the twelve months, and won 31 matches compared to 14 losses.

=== 2007 ===
To commence 2007, Rossana suffered a first round defeat in $50k Waikoloa to start her 2007 season. In her next tournament, she reached the Semifinals of $25k Palm Desert, beating top seed Edina Gallovits 6–2, 6–1. In February, she fell in the first round of $75k Midland the next week but still secured a position inside the top 200 at No. 193- the first time she had broken into the top 200 since 2004. In late February, she competed in Acapulco (Tier III) at the Mexican Open, marking her first tier tournament since Cincinnati in July 2006. De los Ríos arrived at the tournament as the lowest ranked foreign player. She fell in the first round in a close match to the second seed Italian Tathiana Garbin. In April, Rossana represented Paraguay in the annual Federation Cup. Paraguay won all four matches in their Pool and defeated Ecuador in the play-off and as a result qualified for Group 1 of the Americas Zone for 2008. In early May, Rossana recorded her 19th and 20th quarterfinal appearances at $50k Charlottesville and $50k Indian Harbour Beach, respectively. She fell to the eventual winner Edina Gallovits in both events, both times the score being 6–2, 6–2. The following week, Rossana won her first ITF title in 2007 and the sixth in her career in $25k Palm Beach Gardens. As the second seed, she won five matches in the process and lost just one set, beating former top-ten player Brenda Schultz-McCarthy in the final.

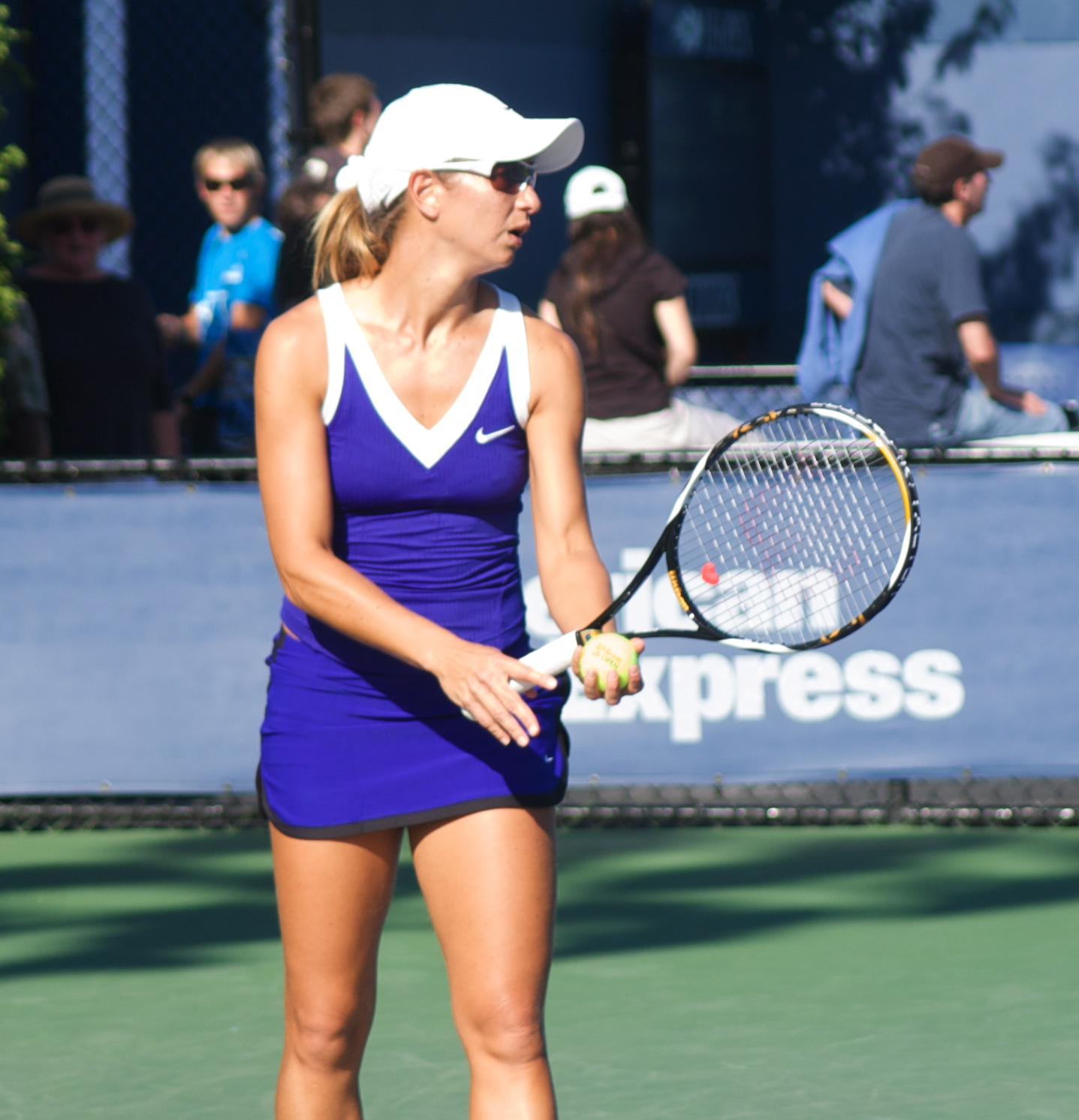
Rossana de los Ríos at the 2008 US Open

Fresh from victory, Rossana quickly flew to Paris for the first time since 2004 to compete in the qualification event of Roland Garros. She caused a stir by easily qualifying, easily winning three straight sets matches. She lost to the 32nd seeded Martina Müller in straight sets in the first round.. Her next tournament was the $75k Zubr Cup in Přerov, where she reached the quarterfinals in singles, before losing to Sofia Arvidsson in straight sets, and reached the doubles final with her partner Edina Gallovits, where she lost to top seeds in three sets. A fortnight later she participated in the qualifying event in Wimbledon which marked her first grass-court match since 2003. She passed the first round in straight sets but lost to Anda Perianu, despite Rossana serving for the match at 5–3 in the final set. Rossana then flew to Italy and made back to back semifinal appearances in $25k Padova and $50k Cuneo tournaments, including a win over top seed Edina Gallovits in Cuneo. She then played the $100k event in Biella where she reached the second round losing to world No. 36, Agnieszka Radwańska. Rossana then played in Rio de Janeiro for the Pan American Games, representing Paraguay. As the fourth seed, she won her first round easily, but lost in the second to Yamile Fors of Cuba, in three close sets.

After this loss, she took some time off, and her next tournament was the US Open qualifying event. There, she lost in the first round to Carla Suarez Navarro. Next, Rossana went to the $50k Mestre in Italy. There, as the fifth seed, she won her second tournament of 2007, beating Alisa Kleybanova in the final. Straight after her victory, she went to the $100k Bordeaux but lost in the first round to the No. 7 seed, Ekaterina Bychkova, despite winning the first set. The next week, Rossana claimed her biggest ITF title to date and the eighth of her career in Albuquerque ($75k). The victory marked her second title in just three weeks. En route to the title in Albuquerque, Rossana won five matches- three of them in three sets- resulting in her ranking rising from 136 to No. 114. Rossana then made two back to back quarterfinal appearances in $50k San Francisco and $50k Lawrenceville, Georgia. She lost in the first round of Quebec City and fell in the quarterfinals of $25k Mexico City to conclude the year.

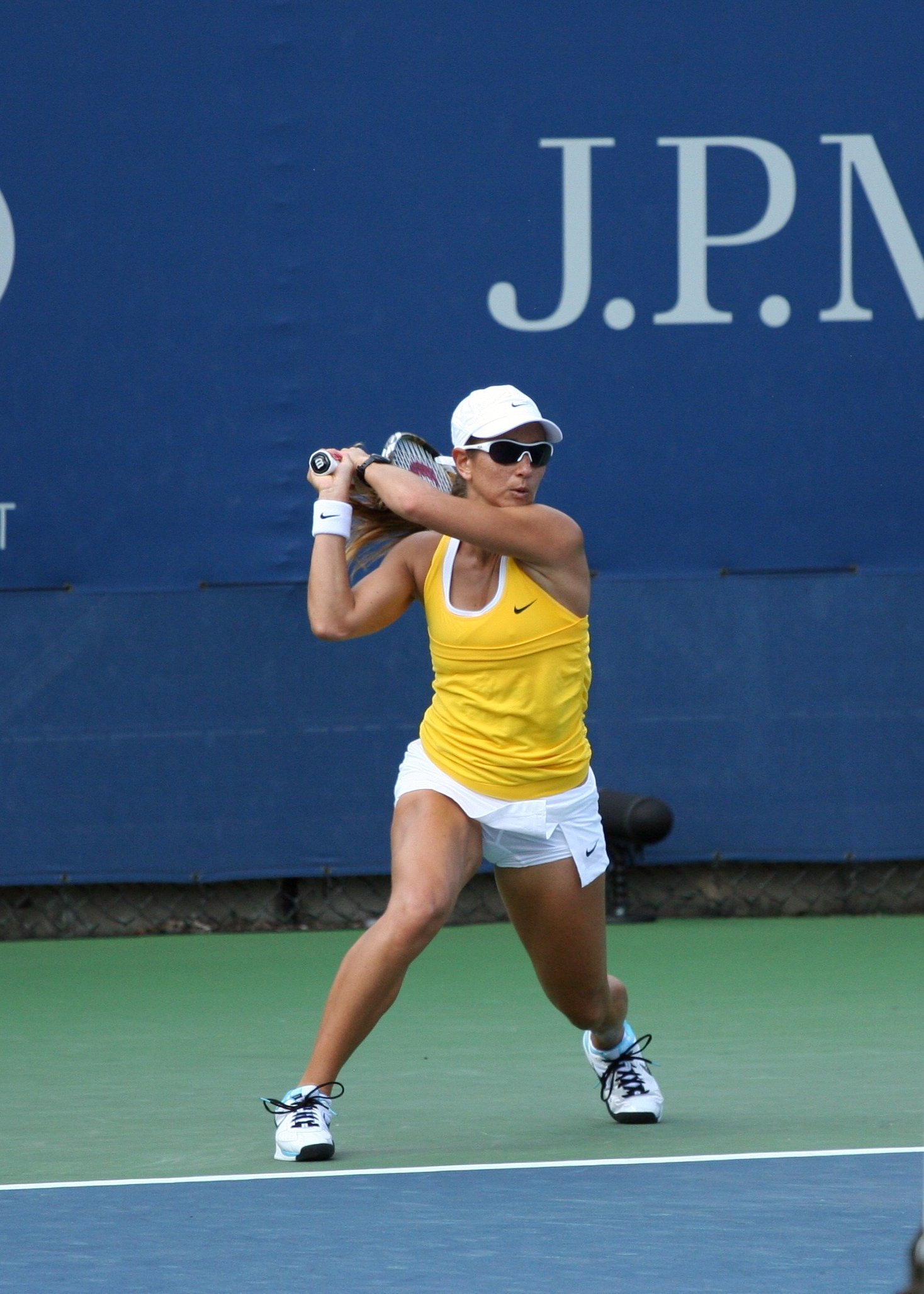
and at the 2009 US Open

=== 2008 ===
On 23 June, Rossana was beaten by then-world No. 1, Ana Ivanovic, in the first round at Wimbledon. Rossana then played at Palermo and defeated fifth seed Aravane Rezaï.

=== 2009 ===
In January 2009, Rossana played in the Australian Open women's singles tournament for the first time since 2003. She won a match in qualifying at the Sydney Medibank International. At the Australian Open, she was defeated 6–3 and 6–2 by Kirsten Flipkens on 19 January. She represented Paraguay in the Federation Cup two weeks later, where Paraguay lost 0–3 to Puerto Rico and 0–3 to Brazil, but defeated Uruguay 3–0 and Mexico 2–0 to secure Paraguay's position in the Americas Zone I for 2009. In February, Rossana played her first WTA Tour main-draw match for the year in Viña del Mar. She defeated Carla Suarez Navarro, which marked her first WTA main-draw victory since Philadelphia in 2004. She also reached the second round in Bogotá and Miami, which resulted in her breaking back inside the top 100 for the first time since 2003. Rossana then reached the final of $25k Pelham, Alabama and in May she qualified for Strasbourg, winning three qualifying matches. She competed in Roland Garros and for the first time in 19 Grand Slam events, Rossana's ranking was high enough for her to directly enter the main draw.

=== 2010 ===
At the 2010 Australian Open, de los Ríos was eliminated in the first round by Marion Bartoli. In the 2010 Roland Garros, she was defeated 4–6, 6–1 and 6–0 by Samantha Stosur. She has not played in any WTA or ITF tournaments since the 2010 US Open.

== WTA Tour finals ==
=== Doubles: 2 (runner-ups) ===
Winner – Legend
Grand Slam
Tier I
Tier II (0–1)
Tier III, IV & V (0–1)

Result	W/L	Date	Tournament	Surface	Partner	Opponents	Score
Loss	0–1	May 2002	Madrid Open, Spain	Clay	(Spain) Arantxa Sánchez Vicario	(United States) Martina Navratilova (Belarus) Natasha Zvereva	2–6, 3–6
Loss	0–2	Sep 2002	Brasil Open, Brazil	Hard	(France) Émilie Loit	(Spain) Virginia Ruano Pascual (Argentina) Paola Suárez	4–6, 1–6

== ITF finals ==
Legend
$75,000 tournaments
$50,000 tournaments
$25,000 tournaments
$10,000 tournaments

=== Singles (11–14) ===
Result	No.	Date	Tournament	Surface	Opponent	Score
Win	1.	13 May 1991	Francavilla, Italy	Clay	(Italy) Ginevra Mugnaini	6–3, 7–5
Loss	1.	17 June 1991	Modena, Italy	Clay	(France) Sybille Niox-Château	0–6, 1–6
Win	2.	23 September 1991	Lima, Peru	Clay	(Paraguay) Larissa Schaerer	6–3, 6–1
Win	3.	28 September 1992	Santa Maria, Italy	Clay	(Italy) Marzia Grossi	6–4, 6–0
Loss	2.	26 October 1992	Asunción, Paraguay	Clay	(Paraguay) Larissa Schaerer	5–7, 1–6
Loss	3.	30 November 1992	Mildura, Australia	Hard	(South Africa) Tessa Price	3–6, 3–6
Loss	4.	7 June 1993	Caserta, Italy	Clay	(France) Sarah Pitkowski-Malcor	5–7, 3–6
Win	4.	30 August 1999	Buenos Aires, Argentina	Clay	(Argentina) Melisa Arévalo	6–0, 6–2
Loss	5.	10 April 2000	La Cañada, United States	Clay	(China) Yi Jingqian	6–3, 5–7, 3–6
Loss	6.	1 May 2000	Virginia Beach, United States	Clay	(Canada) Marie-Ève Pelletier	6–7^{(5–7)}, 2–6
Loss	7.	9 October 2000	Miramar, United States	Clay	(Russia) Alina Jidkova	6–1, 6–7^{(2–7)}, 2–6
Loss	8.	6 November 2000	Pittsburgh, United States	Hard	(United States) Sandra Cacic	5–7, 6–1, 2–6
Loss	9.	11 July 2004	College Park, United States	Hard	(Russia) Olga Puchkova	5–7, 6–4, 2–6
Loss	10.	6 May 2006	Indian Harbour Beach, United States	Clay	(Romania) Edina Gallovits-Hall	6–3, 6–7^{(5–7)}, 6–7^{(0–7)}
Loss	11.	16 May 2006	Palm Beach, United States	Clay	(Argentina) Jorgelina Cravero	2–6, 4–6
Win	5.	29 November 2006	San Diego, United States	Hard	(Croatia) Ivana Abramović	6–0, 6–2
Win	6.	8 May 2007	Palm Beach, United States	Clay	(Netherlands) Brenda Schultz-McCarthy	7–5, 6–4
Win	7.	3 September 2007	Save Cup, Italy	Clay	(Russia) Alisa Kleybanova	6–4, 3–6, 6–1
Win	8.	17 September 2007	Albuquerque, United States	Hard	(Estonia) Maret Ani	7–6^{(8–6)}, 1–6, 6–2
Loss	12.	31 March 2008	Pelham, United States	Clay	(United States) Raquel Kops-Jones	3–6, 4–6
Loss	13.	15 September 2008	Albuquerque, United States	Hard	(United States) Julie Ditty	4–6, 6–7^{(3–7)}
Loss	14.	3 February 3009	Cali, Colombia	Clay	(Belarus) Anastasia Yakimova	3–6, 0–6
Win	9.	30 March 2009	Pelham, United States	Clay	(Argentina) Jorgelina Cravero	6–4, 6–1
Win	10.	1 November 2009	Bayamón, Puerto Rico	Hard	(Croatia) Mirjana Lučić	6–3, 6–4
Win	11.	6 December 2009	Buenos Aires, Argentina	Clay	(Argentina) Paula Ormaechea	7–5, 6–1

=== Doubles (7–3) ===
Result	No.	Date	Tournament	Surface	Partner	Opponents	Score
Win	1.	26 August 1991	São Paulo, Brazil	Clay	(Paraguay) Larissa Schaerer	(Argentina) María José Gaidano (Argentina) Cintia Tortorella	6–4, 6–4
Win	2.	23 September 1991	Lima, Peru	Clay	(Paraguay) Larissa Schaerer	(Ecuador) María Dolores Campana (Brazil) Janaina Mercadante	6–2, 6–3
Win	3.	30 September 1991	La Paz, Bolivia	Clay	(Paraguay) Larissa Schaerer	(Chile) Paula Cabezas (Brazil) Janaina Mercadante	6–3, 7–5
Win	4.	30 August 1999	Buenos Aires, Argentina	Clay	(Argentina) Geraldine Aizenberg	(Argentina) Eugenia Chialvo (Argentina) Jorgelina Cravero	7–5, 6–1
Win	5.	19 September 1999	Asunción, Paraguay	Hard	(Paraguay) Larissa Schaerer	(Colombia) Mariana Mesa (Switzerland) Aliénor Tricerri	6–2, 6–3
Win	6.	14 November 1999	Monterrey, Mexico	Hard	(Argentina) Mariana Díaz Oliva	(Italy) Alice Canepa (Argentina) Clarisa Fernandez	4–6, 7–6^{(6)}, 6–3
Loss	1.	15 October 2000	Miramar, United States	Clay	(United States) Samantha Reeves	(South Africa) Liezel Huber (Australia) Lisa McShea	3–5, 1–4, 1–4
Loss	2.	19 October 2003	Sedona, United States	Clay	(Russia) Alina Jidkova	(China) Yan Zi (China) Zheng Jie	6–7^{(2)}, 6–7^{(3)}
Loss	3.	10 June 2007	Zubr Cup, Czech Republic	Clay	(United States) Edina Gallovits	(Czech Republic) Lucie Hradecká (Czech Republic) Renata Voráčová	7–5, 3–6, 2–6
Win	7.	19 November 2007	Mexico City, Mexico	Hard	(South Africa) Surina De Beer	(Mexico) Daniela Múñoz Gallegos (Mexico) Valeria Pulido	6–3, 6–1

== Grand Slam singles performance timeline ==
Key
W	F	SF	QF	#R	RR	Q#	DNQ	A	NH

(W) winner; (F) finalist; (SF) semifinalist; (QF) quarterfinalist; (#R) rounds 4, 3, 2, 1; (RR) round-robin stage; (Q#) qualification round; (DNQ) did not qualify; (A) absent; (NH) not held; (SR) strike rate (events won / competed); (W–L) win–loss record.

Tournament	1993	1994	1995	1996	1997	1998	1999	2000	2001	2002	2003	2004	2005	2006	2007	2008	2009	2010	W–L
Australian Open	A	1R	A	A	A	A	A	A	2R	2R	1R	A	A	A	A	LQ	1R	1R	2–6
French Open	A	LQ	A	A	A	A	A	4R	2R	3R	1R	LQ	A	A	1R	1R	1R	2R	7–8
Wimbledon	A	LQ	A	A	A	A	A	1R	1R	2R	1R	A	A	A	LQ	1R	2R	1R	2–7
US Open	1R	A	A	A	A	A	A	1R	1R	2R	LQ	LQ	A	LQ	LQ	2R	1R	LQ	2–6
Win–loss	0–1	0–1	0–0	0–0	0–0	0–0	0–0	3–3	2–4	5–4	0–3	0–0	0–0	0–0	0–1	1–3	1–4	1–3	13–27

== Personal life ==
She was known for trading her fame for love, when she married Paraguayan footballer Gustavo Neffa. Their wedding was on 26 December 1994. De los Ríos and Neffa have a daughter named Ana Paula, who was born on 17 January 1997. De los Ríos stopped playing for five years to dedicate time to her daughter, returning to tennis in 2000.

In 2002, de los Ríos commented about being one of the few mothers on the WTA Tour:

Being a person who gives birth was more important than being tennis player. Tennis was just my job. I always thought I stop for good. After practicing and practicing, I do well. It was hard with my daughter. My husband traveled with me, but we still needed a nanny sometimes. For us it is still not easy. Ana is five and she likes to watch tennis. Most of the bigger tournaments have nurseries, which helps. My mind has changed after Ana. It is easy for the men. They are not having the babies. Still, is good that they are fathers. It's important to be parent.

—
