= Camila Giorgi career statistics =

Italian tennis player

Career finals
Discipline	Type	Won	Lost	Total	WR
Singles	Grand Slam	–	–	–	–
Singles	WTA Finals	–	–	–	–
Singles	WTA 1000	1	0	1	1.00
Singles	WTA Tour	3	6	9	0.33
Singles	Olympics	–	–	–	–
Singles	Total	4	6	10	0.40
Doubles	Grand Slam	–	–	–	–
Doubles	WTA Finals	–	–	–	–
Doubles	WTA 1000	–	–	–	–
Doubles	WTA Tour	–	–	–	–
Doubles	Olympics	–	–	–	–
Doubles	Total	–	–	–	–

This is a list of the main career statistics of professional Italian tennis player Camila Giorgi.

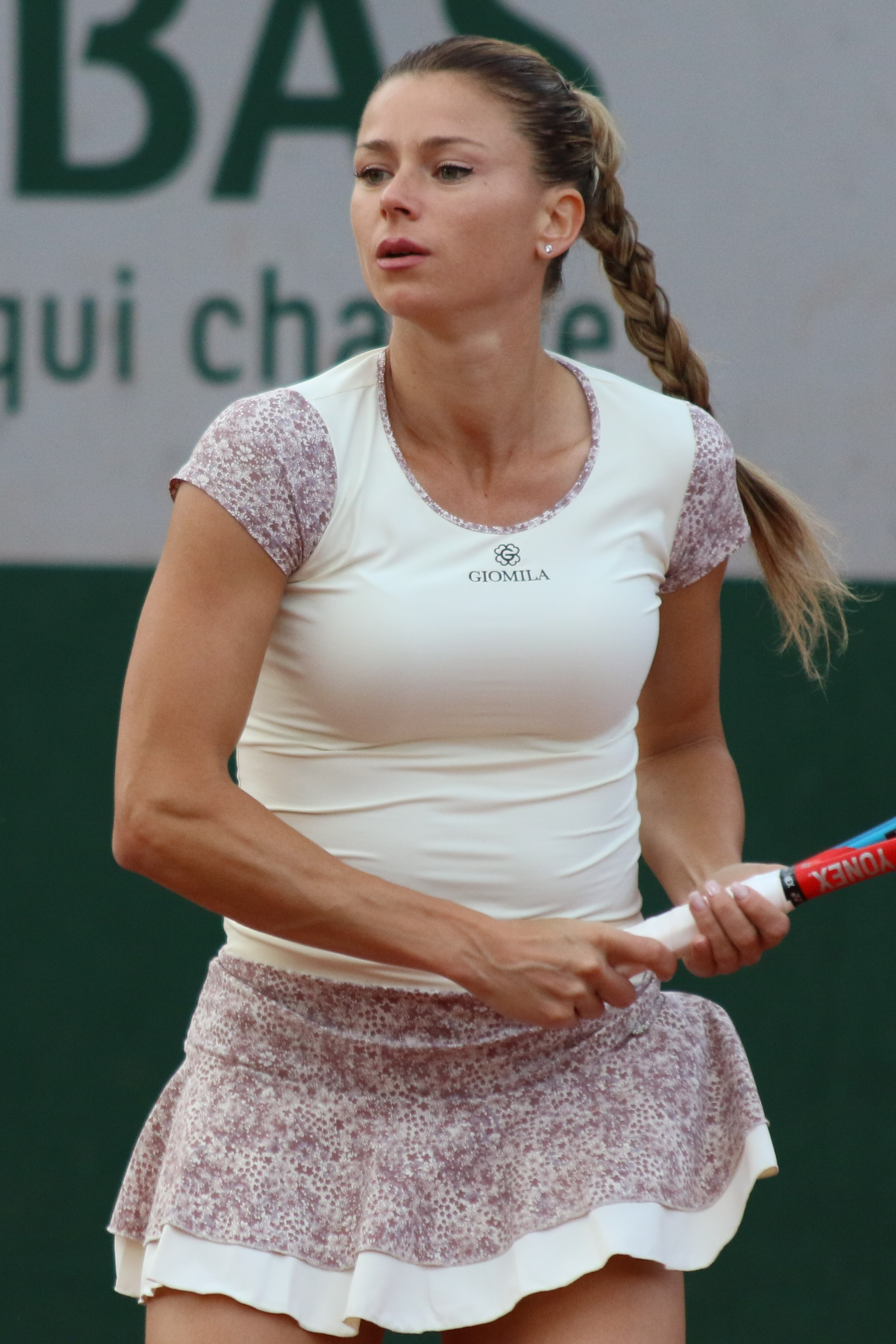
Giorgi at the 2022 French Open.

== Performance timelines ==
Key
W	F	SF	QF	#R	RR	Q#	P#	DNQ	A	Z#	PO	G	S	B	NMS	NTI	P	NH

(W) winner; (F) finalist; (SF) semifinalist; (QF) quarterfinalist; (#R) rounds 4, 3, 2, 1; (RR) round-robin stage; (Q#) qualification round; (P#) preliminary round; (DNQ) did not qualify; (A) absent; (Z#) Davis/Fed Cup Zonal Group (with number indication) or (PO) play-off; (G) gold, (S) silver or (B) bronze Olympic/Paralympic medal; (NMS) not a Masters tournament; (NTI) not a Tier I tournament; (P) postponed; (NH) not held; (SR) strike rate (events won / competed); (W–L) win–loss record.
To avoid confusion and double counting, these charts are updated at the conclusion of a tournament or when the player's participation has ended.

Only main-draw results in WTA Tour, Grand Slam tournaments, Billie Jean King Cup, United Cup, Hopman Cup and Olympic Games are included in win–loss records.

=== Singles ===
Current through the 2024 Miami Open.

Tournament	2008	2009	2010	2011	2012	2013	2014	2015	2016	2017	2018	2019	2020	2021	2022	2023	2024	SR	W–L	Win %
Grand Slam tournaments
Australian Open	A	A	A	A	A	1R	2R	3R	1R	1R	2R	3R	3R	2R	3R	3R	1R	0 / 12	13–12	52%
French Open	A	A	A	A	Q3	1R	2R	2R	2R	1R	3R	A	1R	2R	4R	2R	A	0 / 10	10–10	50%
Wimbledon	A	A	A	1R	4R	3R	2R	3R	1R	3R	QF	1R	NH	2R	1R	1R	A	0 / 12	15–12	56%
US Open	A	A	Q1	Q2	1R	4R	1R	2R	1R	1R	2R	1R	2R	1R	2R	1R	A	0 / 12	7–12	37%
Win–loss	0–0	0–0	0–0	0–1	3–2	5–4	3–4	6–4	1–4	2–4	8–4	2–3	3–3	3–4	6–4	3–4	0–1	0 / 46	45–46	49%
National representation
Summer Olympics	A	NH			A	NH			A	NH				QF	NH		A	0 / 1	3–1	75%
Billie Jean King Cup (Note: Formerly known as Fed Cup until 2020.)	A	A	A	A	A	A	1R	1R	1R	A	A	WG2	PO (Note: Edition is split into the two years due to COVID-19.)		RR	RR	A	0 / 4	8–7	53%
WTA 1000
Dubai / Qatar Open (Note: The first Premier 5 event of the year has switched back and forth between the Dubai Tennis Championships and the Qatar Ladies Open since 2009. Dubai was classified as a Premier 5 event from 2009 to 2011 before being succeeded by Doha for the 2012–2014 period. In 2015, Dubai regained its Premier 5 status while Doha was demoted to Premier status. The Premier 5 tournaments were reclassified as WTA 1000 tournaments in 2021.)	A	A	A	A	A	A	A	2R	A	A	A	A	Q2	A	A	A	A	0 / 1	1–1	50%
Indian Wells Open	A	A	A	A	A	A	4R	2R	2R	1R	A	A	NH	2R	A	2R	2R	0 / 7	6–7	46%
Miami Open	A	A	A	A	A	1R	Q1	3R	1R	A	1R	2R	NH	1R	A	2R	2R	0 / 8	3–8	27%
Madrid Open	NH	A	A	A	A	1R	Q2	1R	2R (Note: Giorgi withdrew before her second-round match against Anastasia Pavlyuchenkova. Not counted as a loss.)	A	A	A	NH	A	1R	1R	A	0 / 5	1–4	20%
Italian Open	Q1	A	A	A	A	A	2R	1R	A	A	Q2	A	1R	1R	1R	3R	A	0 / 6	3–6	33%
Canadian Open	A	A	A	A	A	A	1R	A	2R	Q2	A	1R	NH	W	3R	2R	A	1 / 6	10–5	67%
Cincinnati Open	A	A	A	A	2R	A	1R	2R	Q1	3R	2R	1R	A	1R	1R	Q1	A	0 / 8	5–8	38%
Guadalajara Open	NH														A	3R	NMS	0 / 1	2–1	67%
Pan Pacific / Wuhan Open (Note: In 2014, the Pan Pacific Open was downgraded to a Premier event and replaced by the Wuhan Open. The Premier 5 tournaments were reclassified as WTA 1000 tournaments in 2021.)	A	A	A	A	1R	A	1R	3R	A	A	1R	1R	NH				A	0 / 5	2–5	29%
China Open	NMS	A	A	A	2R	A	1R	1R	A	A	A	A	NH			A	A	0 / 3	1–3	25%
Win–loss	0–0	0–0	0–0	0–0	2–3	0–2	4–6	5–8	3–3	2–2	1–3	0–4	0–1	6–4	2–4	7–6	2–2	1 / 50	34–48	41%
Career statistics
	2008	2009	2010	2011	2012	2013	2014	2015	2016	2017	2018	2019	2020	2021	2022	2023	2024	SR	W–L	Win %
Tournaments	0	0	0	1	10	11	19	22	20	13	17	14	9	18	16	16	6	Career total: 192		
Titles	0	0	0	0	0	0	0	1	0	0	1	0	0	1	0	1	0	Career total: 4		
Finals	0	0	0	0	0	0	2	2	1	0	1	2	0	1	0	1	0	Career total: 10		
Hard win–loss	0–0	0–0	0–0	0–0	3–8	4–5	18–12	16–15	12–14	7–7	15–9	13–14	8–6	16–10	7–8	14–8	3–6	3 / 120	136–122	53%
Clay win–loss	0–0	0–0	0–0	0–0	0–1	2–4	6–5	2–6	4–3	3–3	9–4	0–0	4–4	3–4	3–4	3–3	0–0	0 / 40	39–41	49%
Grass win–loss	0–0	0–0	0–0	0–1	3–1	2–2	4–3	8–2	0–3	5–3	5–3	0–2	NH	5–3	6–4	4–4	0–0	1 / 32	42–31	58%
Overall win–loss	0–0	0–0	0–0	0–1	6–10	8–11	28–20	26–23	16–20	15–13	29–16	13–16	12–10	24–17	16–16	21–15	3–6	4 / 192	217–194	53%
Year-end ranking (Note: 2006: WTA ranking–944, 2007: WTA ranking–833.)	480	285	244	149	79	93	35	34	83	79	26	98	75	34	67	56		$6,229,475		

=== Doubles ===
Tournament	2013	2014	SR	W–L	Win %
Grand Slam tournaments
Australian Open	1R	A	0 / 1	0–1	0%
French Open	A	A	0 / 0	0–0	–
Wimbledon	A	A	0 / 0	0–0	–
US Open	A	A	0 / 0	0–0	–
Win–loss	0–1	0–0	0 / 1	0–1	0%
WTA 1000
Italian Open	A	1R	0 / 1	0–1	0%
Career statistics
Tournaments	1	1	Career total: 2		
Overall win–loss	0–1	0–2	0 / 2	0–3	0%
Year-end ranking	n/a	n/a			

== Significant finals ==
=== WTA 1000 tournaments ===
==== Singles: 1 (title) ====
Result	Year	Tournament	Surface	Opponent	Score
Win	2021	Canadian Open	Hard	(Czech Republic) Karolína Plíšková	6–3, 7–5

== WTA Tour finals ==
=== Singles: 10 (4 titles, 6 runner-ups) ===
Legend Grand Slam (0-0) WTA 1000 (1–0) WTA 500 (0-0) WTA 250 (3–6)	Finals by surface Hard (3–6) Grass (1–0) Clay (0–0) Carpet (0–0)

Result	W–L	Date	Tournament	Tier	Surface	Opponent	Score
Loss	0–1	Apr 2014	Katowice Open, Poland	International (Note: The WTA International tournaments were reclassified as WTA 250 tournaments in 2021.)	Hard (i)	(France) Alizé Cornet	6–7^{(3–7)}, 7–5, 5–7
Loss	0–2	Oct 2014	Ladies Linz, Austria	International	Hard (i)	(Czech Republic) Karolína Plíšková	7–6^{(7–4)}, 3–6, 6–7^{(4–7)}
Loss	0–3	Apr 2015	Katowice Open, Poland	International	Hard (i)	(Slovakia) Anna Karolína Schmiedlová	4–6, 3–6
Win	1–3	Jun 2015	Rosmalen Open, Netherlands	International	Grass	(Switzerland) Belinda Bencic	7–5, 6–3
Loss	1–4	Apr 2016	Katowice Open, Poland	International	Hard (i)	(Slovakia) Dominika Cibulková	4–6, 0–6
Win	2–4	Oct 2018	Ladies Linz, Austria	International	Hard (i)	(Russia) Ekaterina Alexandrova	6–3, 6–1
Loss	2–5	Aug 2019	Washington Open, U.S.	International	Hard	(United States) Jessica Pegula	2–6, 2–6
Loss	2–6	Aug 2019	Bronx Open, U.S.	International	Hard	(Poland) Magda Linette	7–5, 5–7, 4–6
Win	3–6	Aug 2021	Canadian Open, Canada	WTA 1000	Hard	(Czech Republic) Karolína Plíšková	6–3, 7–5
Win	4–6	Feb 2023	Mérida Open, Mexico	WTA 250	Hard	(Sweden) Rebecca Peterson	7–6^{(7–3)}, 1–6, 6–2

== ITF Circuit finals ==
=== Singles: 7 (5 titles, 2 runner–ups) ===
Legend $50,000 tournaments (3–1) $25,000 tournaments (2–1)	Finals by surface Hard (3–0) Clay (2–2)

Result	W–L	Date	Tournament	Tier	Surface	Opponent	Score
Win	1–0	Aug 2009	ITF Katowice, Poland	25,000	Clay	(Russia) Ksenia Pervak	6–2, 6–3
Win	2–0	Nov 2009	Toronto Challenger, Canada	50,000	Hard (i)	(Hungary) Anikó Kapros	4–6, 6–4, 6–0
Loss	2–1	Jun 2010	ITF Bratislava, Slovakia	25,000	Clay	(Slovakia) Lenka Juríková	2–6, 1–6
Win	3–1	Oct 2010	ITF Rock Hill, United States	25,000	Hard	(United States) Irina Falconi	6–3, 6–4
Loss	3–2	May 2011	Raleigh Challenger, U.S.	50,000	Clay	(Slovenia) Petra Rampre	3–6, 2–6
Win	4–2	May 2011	Carson Challenger, U.S.	50,000	Hard	(United States) Alexa Glatch	7–6^{(7–4)}, 6–1
Win	5–2	Apr 2012	Dothan Pro Classic, U.S.	50,000	Clay	(Romania) Edina Gallovits-Hall	6–2, 4–6, 6–4

== Fed Cup/Billie Jean King Cup participation ==
Giorgi debuted for the Italy Fed Cup team in 2014.

Legend
World Group (2–2)
World Group Play-off / Finals Qualifying Round (3–2)
World Group 2 Play-Off (0–2)
Zone Group (2–1)

=== Singles (7–7) ===
Edition	Round	Date	Location	Against	Surface	Opponent	W/L	Result
2014	WG QF	Feb 2014	Cleveland (USA)	United States	Hard (i)	Madison Keys	W (1)	6–2, 6–1
2014	WG SF	Apr 2014	Ostrava (CZE)	Czech Republic	Hard (i)	Petra Kvitová	L (1)	4–6, 2–6
2015	WG QF	Feb 2015	Genoa (ITA)	France	Clay (i)	Alizé Cornet	W (2)	6–4, 6–2
2015	WG QF	Feb 2015	Genoa (ITA)	France	Clay (i)	Caroline Garcia	L (2)	6–4, 0–6, 2–6
2015	WG PO	Apr 2015	Brindisi (ITA)	United States	Clay (i)	Serena Williams	L (3)	6–7^{(5–7)}, 2–6
2016	WG QF	Feb 2016	Marseille (FRA)	France	Hard (i)	Kristina Mladenovic	W (3)	1–6, 6–4, 6–1
2016	WG QF	Feb 2016	Marseille (FRA)	France	Hard (i)	Caroline Garcia	L (4)	3–6, 4–6
2019	WG2 RR	Feb 2019	Biel/Bienne (SUI)	Switzerland	Hard (i)	Viktorija Golubic	L (5)	4–6, 6–2, 4–6
2019	WG2 RR	Feb 2019	Biel/Bienne (SUI)	Switzerland	Hard (i)	Belinda Bencic	L (6)	2–6, 4–6
2020–21	Z1 RR	Feb 2020	Tallinn (EST)	Austria	Hard (i)	Mira Antonitsch	W (4)	4–6, 6–3, 6–0
2020–21	Z1 RR	Feb 2020	Tallinn (EST)	Estonia	Hard (i)	Anett Kontaveit	L (7)	3–6, 6–4, 6–7
2020–21	Z1 PO	Feb 2020	Tallinn (EST)	Croatia	Hard (i)	Jana Fett	W (5)	7–6, 6–4
2022	F QR	Apr 2022	Alghero (ITA)	France	Hard	Océane Dodin	W (6)	6–1, 6–2
2022	F QR	Apr 2022	Alghero (ITA)	France	Hard	Harmony Tan	W (7)	6–2, 6–0

=== Doubles (0–1) ===
Edition	Round	Date	Location	Partner	Against	Surface	Opponents	W/L	Result
2014	WG SF	Apr 2014	Ostrava (CZE)	Karin Knapp	Czech Republic	Hard (i)	Andrea Hlaváčková; Klára Koukalová	L (1)	2–6, 7–5, [9–11]

== WTA Tour career earnings ==
current as of 23 May 2022

Year	Grand Slam titles	WTA titles	Total titles	Earnings ($)	Money list rank
2013	0	0	0	357,368	72
2014	0	0	0	448,626	63
2015	0	1	1	580,781	54
2016	0	0	0	352,779	88
2017	0	0	0	374,444	98
2018	0	1	1	922,593	40
2019	0	0	0	407,043	107
2020	0	0	0	334,139	69
2021	0	1	1	733,471	47
2022	0	0	0	226,906	77
Career	0	3	3	5,050,334	125

== Head-to-head records ==
=== Top 10 wins ===
Season	2012	2013	2014	2015	2016	2017	2018	...	2021	2022	2023	Total
Wins	1	1	3	1	0	2	1		4	3	1	17

#	Opponent	Rk	Event	Surface	Rd	Score	Rk
2012
1.	(Italy) Sara Errani	7	China Open	Hard	1R	5–4 ret.	93
2013
2.	(Denmark) Caroline Wozniacki	No. 8	US Open, U.S.	Hard	3R	4–6, 6–4, 6–3	136
2014
3.	(Russia) Maria Sharapova	No. 5	Indian Wells Open, U.S.	Hard	3R	6–3, 4–6, 7–5	79
4.	(Slovakia) Dominika Cibulková	No. 10	Italian Open, Italy	Clay	1R	6–4, 7–6^{(2)}	54
5.	(Belarus) Victoria Azarenka	No. 8	Eastbourne International, UK	Grass	1R	4–6, 6–3, 7–5	42
2015
6.	(Poland) Agnieszka Radwańska	No. 9	Katowice Open, Poland	Hard (i)	SF	6–4, 6–2	34
2017
7.	(Czech Republic) Karolína Plíšková	No. 3	Prague Open, Czech Republic	Clay	1R	7–6^{(6)}, 6–2	99
8.	(Ukraine) Elina Svitolina	No. 5	Birmingham Classic, UK	Grass	2R	6–4, 4–6, 6–2	102
2018
9.	(Denmark) Caroline Wozniacki	No. 2	Pan Pacific Open, Japan	Hard (i)	2R	6–2, 2–6, 6–4	37
2021
10.	(Czech Republic) Karolína Plíšková	No. 10	Eastbourne International, UK	Grass	1R	2–6, 6–2, 6–2	75
11.	(Belarus) Aryna Sabalenka	No. 4	Eastbourne International, UK	Grass	QF	7–6^{(7–5)}, 0–6, 6–4	75
12.	(Czech Republic) Karolína Plíšková	No. 7	Tokyo Olympics	Hard	3R	6–4, 6–2	58
13.	(Czech Republic) Karolína Plíšková	No. 6	Canadian Open	Hard	F	6–3, 7–5	71
2022
14.	(Belarus) Aryna Sabalenka	No. 7	French Open, France	Clay	3R	4–6, 6–1, 6–0	30
15.	(Spain) Garbiñe Muguruza	No. 10	Eastbourne International, UK	Grass	3R	7–5, 6–3	26
16.	(United Kingdom) Emma Raducanu	No. 10	Canadian Open, Canada	Hard	1R	7–6^{(7–0)}, 6–2	29
2023
17.	(Tunisia) Ons Jabeur	No. 6	Eastbourne International, UK	Grass	2R	6–3, 6–2	67

=== Double-bagel matches ===
Result	W–L	Year	Tournament	Tier	Surface	Opponent	Rank	Rd	CGR
Win	1–0	2007	Lagos Open, Nigeria	25,000	Hard	(Nigeria) Vivian Cassimer	N/A	Q2	No. 824
Win	2–0	2011	Carson Challenger, United States	50,000	Hard	(United States) Ashley Weinhold (3)	No. 250	SF	No. 196
Win	3–0	2023	Mérida Open, Mexico	WTA 250	Hard	(United States) Sloane Stephens (2)	No. 41	QF	No. 68
