= 2015 Katowice Open – Doubles =

Doubles
- 2015 Katowice Open

Final
- Champions: (Belgium) Ysaline Bonaventure (Netherlands) Demi Schuurs
- Runners-up: (Italy) Gioia Barbieri (Italy) Karin Knapp
- Score: 7-5, 4-6, [10-6]

Events
| Singles | Doubles |
| ← 2014 · | Katowice Open | · 2016 → |

Yuliya Beygelzimer and Olga Savchuk were the defending champions, but Savchuk chose to compete in Charleston instead. Beygelzimer played alongside Eva Hrdinová, but they lost in the first round to Ysaline Bonaventure and Demi Schuurs.

Bonaventure and Schuurs went on to win the title, defeating Gioia Barbieri and Karin Knapp in the final, 7-5, 4-6, [10-6].

== Seeds ==
1. (Poland) Klaudia Jans-Ignacik / (France) Kristina Mladenovic (quarterfinals)
2. (Czech Republic) Klára Koukalová / (Czech Republic) Kateřina Siniaková (quarterfinals)
3. (Ukraine) Lyudmyla Kichenok / (Ukraine) Nadiia Kichenok (semifinals)
4. (Ukraine) Yuliya Beygelzimer / (Czech Republic) Eva Hrdinová (first round)

== Draw ==
=== Key ===
- Q = Qualifier
- WC = Wild card
- LL = Lucky loser
- Alt = Alternate
- SE = Special exempt
- PR = Protected ranking
- ITF = ITF entry
- JE = Junior exempt
- w/o = Walkover
- r = Retired
- d = Defaulted
- SR = Special ranking

=== Draw ===
First round
1 | (Poland) K Jans-Ignacik (France) K Mladenovic | 6 | 6
(United Kingdom) J Rae (United Kingdom) A Smith | 0 | 2
(Italy) G Barbieri (Italy) K Knapp | 6 | 4 | [10]
(Japan) M Doi (Israel) S Pe'er | 2 | 6 | [5]
3 | (Ukraine) L Kichenok (Ukraine) N Kichenok | 2 | 7^{7} | [10]
(Serbia) A Krunić (Croatia) P Martić | 6 | 6^{3} | [6]
(Romania) R Olaru (Russia) V Zvonareva | 6^{7} | 6^{5}
WC | (Poland) M Fręch (Poland) K Kawa | 7^{9} | 7^{7}
(Georgia (country)) O Kalashnikova (Hungary) K Marosi | 7 | 6
(Argentina) T Búa (Chile) D Seguel | 5 | 4
(Belgium) Y Bonaventure (Netherlands) D Schuurs | 6 | 6
4 | (Ukraine) Y Beygelzimer (Czech Republic) E Hrdinová | 2 | 1
(Austria) S Klemenschits (France) L Thorpe | 5 | 4
(France) A Cornet (Poland) M Linette | 7 | 6
(Russia) M Gasparyan (Belarus) A Sasnovich | 6 | 4 | [5]
2 | (Czech Republic) K Koukalová (Czech Republic) K Siniaková | 1 | 6 | [10]

Quarterfinals
1 | (Poland) K Jans-Ignacik (France) K Mladenovic | 3 | 4
(Italy) G Barbieri (Italy) K Knapp | 6 | 6
3 | (Ukraine) L Kichenok (Ukraine) N Kichenok | 6 | 4 | [12]
WC | (Poland) M Fręch (Poland) K Kawa | 4 | 6 | [10]
(Georgia (country)) O Kalashnikova (Hungary) K Marosi | 6^{4} | 3
(Belgium) Y Bonaventure (Netherlands) D Schuurs | 7^{7} | 6
(France) A Cornet (Poland) M Linette | 7 | 7
2 | (Czech Republic) K Koukalová (Czech Republic) K Siniaková | 5 | 5

Semifinals
(Italy) G Barbieri (Italy) K Knapp | 6 | 6
3 | (Ukraine) L Kichenok (Ukraine) N Kichenok | 3 | 1
(Belgium) Y Bonaventure (Netherlands) D Schuurs | 6 | 6
(France) A Cornet (Poland) M Linette | 4 | 2

Final
(Italy) G Barbieri (Italy) K Knapp | 5 | 6 | [6]
(Belgium) Y Bonaventure (Netherlands) D Schuurs | 7 | 4 | [10]
