= 2016 Katowice Open – Doubles =

Doubles
- 2016 Katowice Open

Final
- Champions: (Japan) Eri Hozumi (Japan) Miyu Kato
- Runners-up: (Russia) Valentyna Ivakhnenko (Russia) Marina Melnikova
- Score: 3–6, 7–5, [10–8]

Events
Singles	Doubles
← 2015 ·	Katowice Open

For the doubles event during the 2016 Katowice Open, Eri Hozumi and Miyu Kato won the title, defeating Ivakhnenko and Melnikova in the final, 3–6, 7–5, [10–8].

Ysaline Bonaventure and Demi Schuurs were the defending champions, but Bonaventure chose not to participate this year. Schuurs played alongside Oksana Kalashnikova, but lost in the quarterfinals to Valentyna Ivakhnenko and Marina Melnikova.

== Seeds ==
1. (Argentina) María Irigoyen / (Poland) Paula Kania (first round)
2. (Georgia (country)) Oksana Kalashnikova / (Netherlands) Demi Schuurs (quarterfinals)
3. (Russia) Vera Dushevina / (Spain) María José Martínez Sánchez (first round)
4. (United Kingdom) Jocelyn Rae / (United Kingdom) Anna Smith (first round)

== Draw ==
=== Key ===
- Q = Qualifier
- WC = Wild card
- LL = Lucky loser
- Alt = Alternate
- SE = Special exempt
- PR = Protected ranking
- ITF = ITF entry
- JE = Junior exempt
- w/o = Walkover
- r = Retired
- d = Defaulted
- SR = Special ranking

First round
1	(Argentina) M Irigoyen (Poland) P Kania	4	3
(New Zealand) M Erakovic (Italy) K Knapp	6	6
(United Kingdom) N Broady (Poland) A Rosolska	6	6
(Romania) E Bogdan (Romania) A Mitu	1	1
3	(Russia) V Dushevina (Spain) MJ Martínez Sánchez	6	4	[13]
(Turkey) B Eraydın (Belarus) L Marozava	3	6	[15]
WC	(Poland) K Piter (Czech Republic) Kr Plíšková	6^{3}	1
(Japan) E Hozumi (Japan) M Kato	7^{7}	6
(France) S Foretz (France) A Hesse	6	5	[10]
WC	(Belarus) V Lapko (Belarus) A Sasnovich	1	7	[7]
(Poland) K Jans-Ignacik (United Kingdom) H Watson	2	6	[10]
4	(United Kingdom) J Rae (United Kingdom) A Smith	6	2	[6]
(Russia) V Ivakhnenko (Russia) M Melnikova	7	7^{7}
(Switzerland) V Golubic (Switzerland) X Knoll	5	6^{5}
(Luxembourg) M Minella (Czech Republic) R Voráčová	2	3
2	(Georgia (country)) O Kalashnikova (Netherlands) D Schuurs	6	6

Quarterfinals
(New Zealand) M Erakovic (Italy) K Knapp
(United Kingdom) N Broady (Poland) A Rosolska	w/o
(Turkey) B Eraydın (Belarus) L Marozava	5	4
(Japan) E Hozumi (Japan) M Kato	7	6
(France) S Foretz (France) A Hesse	7	6
(Poland) K Jans-Ignacik (United Kingdom) H Watson	5	4
(Russia) V Ivakhnenko (Russia) M Melnikova	7	1	[10]
2	(Georgia (country)) O Kalashnikova (Netherlands) D Schuurs	5	6	[5]

Semifinals
(United Kingdom) N Broady (Poland) A Rosolska	6	4	[10]
(Japan) E Hozumi (Japan) M Kato	0	6	[12]
(France) S Foretz (France) A Hesse	2	6	[7]
(Russia) V Ivakhnenko (Russia) M Melnikova	6	1	[10]

Final
(Japan) E Hozumi (Japan) M Kato	3	7	[10]
(Russia) V Ivakhnenko (Russia) M Melnikova	6	5	[8]
