= 2016 Katowice Open =

- Date: 4–10 April
- Edition: 4th
- Category: WTA International tournaments
- Draw: 32S / 16D
- Prize money: $250,000
- Surface: Hard (indoor)
- Location: Katowice, Poland
- Venue: Spodek

Champions

Singles
- (Slovakia) Dominika Cibulková

Doubles
- (Japan) Eri Hozumi / (Japan) Miyu Kato
← 2015 ·	Katowice Open

The 2016 Katowice Open was a women's tennis tournament played on indoor hard courts. It was the 4th edition of the Katowice Open and an International tournament on the 2016 WTA Tour. It took place at Spodek arena in Katowice, Poland, from 4 April to 10 April 2016.

== Points and prize money ==
=== Point distribution ===
Event	W	F	SF	QF	Round of 16	Round of 32	Q	Q3	Q2	Q1
Women's singles	280	180	110	60	30	1	18	14	10	1
Women's doubles	280	180	110	60	1	—	—	—	—	—

=== Prize money ===
Event	W	F	SF	QF	Round of 16	Round of 32	Q3	Q2	Q1
Women's singles	$43,000	$21,400	$11,300	$5,900	$3,310	$1,925	$1,005	$730	$530
Women's doubles	$12,300	$6,400	$3,435	$1,820	$960	—	—	—	—

== Singles main-draw entrants ==
=== Seeds ===
Country	Player	Rank^{1}	Seed
~~POL~~	~~Agnieszka Radwańska~~	~~2~~	~~1~~
SVK	Anna Karolína Schmiedlová	30	2
LAT	Jeļena Ostapenko	39	3
FRA	Alizé Cornet	42	4
ITA	Camila Giorgi	43	5
UKR	Lesia Tsurenko	45	6
HUN	Tímea Babos	49	7
SVK	Dominika Cibulková	54	8
BEL	Kirsten Flipkens	65	9

- ^{1} Rankings as of 21 March 2016.

=== Other entrants ===
The following players received wildcards into the main draw:

- (Poland) Paula Kania
- (Belarus) Vera Lapko
- (Ukraine) Anastasiya Shoshyna

The following players received entry from the qualifying draw:

- (Russia) Ekaterina Alexandrova
- (Switzerland) Viktorija Golubic
- (Slovakia) Daniela Hantuchová
- (Bulgaria) Isabella Shinikova

The following players received entry as lucky losers:

- (Czech Republic) Jesika Malečková
- (Ukraine) Valeriya Strakhova

=== Withdrawals ===
Before the tournament

- (Czech Republic) Denisa Allertová → replaced by (Croatia) Donna Vekić
- (Germany) Anna-Lena Friedsam → replaced by (Switzerland) Stefanie Vögele
- (Slovenia) Polona Hercog → replaced by (Czech Republic) Klára Koukalová
- (Estonia) Anett Kontaveit → replaced by (France) Pauline Parmentier
- (Romania) Monica Niculescu → replaced by (Switzerland) Romina Oprandi
- (Poland) Agnieszka Radwańska (shoulder injury) → replaced by (Ukraine) Valeriya Strakhova
- (Slovakia) Magdaléna Rybáriková (left wrist injury) → replaced by (Czech Republic) Jesika Malečková
- (Czech Republic) Barbora Strýcová → replaced by (Czech Republic) Kristýna Plíšková
- (Belgium) Alison Van Uytvanck (ankle surgery) → replaced by (Belarus) Aliaksandra Sasnovich

== WTA doubles main-draw entrants ==
=== Seeds ===
Country	Player	Country	Player	Rank^{1}	Seed
ARG	María Irigoyen	POL	Paula Kania	116	1
GEO	Oksana Kalashnikova	NED	Demi Schuurs	134	2
RUS	Vera Dushevina	ESP	María José Martínez Sánchez	135	3
GBR	Jocelyn Rae	GBR	Anna Smith	146	4

- ^{1} Rankings as of 21 March 2016.

=== Other entrants ===
The following pairs received a wildcard into the main draw:

- (Belarus) Vera Lapko / (Belarus) Aliaksandra Sasnovich
- (Poland) Katarzyna Piter / (Czech Republic) Kristýna Plíšková

=== Withdrawals ===
During the tournament

- (Italy) Karin Knapp (right ankle injury)

== Champions ==
=== Singles ===
- (Slovakia) Dominika Cibulková def. (Italy) Camila Giorgi, 6–4, 6–0

=== Doubles ===
- (Japan) Eri Hozumi / (Japan) Miyu Kato def. (Russia) Valentyna Ivakhnenko / (Russia) Marina Melnikova, 3–6, 7–5, [10–8]
