= 2015 Katowice Open =

- Date: 6–12 April
- Edition: 3rd
- Category: WTA International tournaments
- Draw: 32S / 16D
- Prize money: $250,000
- Surface: Hard
- Location: Katowice, Poland
- Venue: Spodek

Champions

Singles
- (Slovakia) Anna Karolína Schmiedlová

Doubles
- (Belgium) Ysaline Bonaventure / (Netherlands) Demi Schuurs
| ← 2014 · | Katowice Open | · 2016 → |

The 2015 Katowice Open was a women's tennis tournament played on indoor hard courts. It was the 3rd edition of the Katowice Open, in the International category of the 2015 WTA Tour. It took place at Spodek arena in Katowice, Poland, from 6 April through 12 April 2015.

== Points and prize money ==
=== Point distribution ===
| Event | W | F | SF | QF | Round of 16 | Round of 32 | Q | Q3 | Q2 | Q1 |
| Women's singles | 280 | 180 | 110 | 60 | 30 | 1 | 18 | 14 | 10 | 1 |
| Women's doubles | 280 | 180 | 110 | 60 | 1 | — | — | — | — | — |

=== Prize money ===
| Event | W | F | SF | QF | Round of 16 | Round of 32 | Q2 | Q1 |
| Women's singles | $43,000 | $21,400 | $11,300 | $5,900 | $3,310 | $1,925 | $730 | $530 |
| Women's doubles | $12,300 | $6,400 | $3,435 | $1,820 | $960 | — | — | — |

== Singles main-draw entrants ==
=== Seeds ===
| Country | Player | Rank^{1} | Seed |
|---|---|---|---|
| POL | Agnieszka Radwańska | 8 | 1 |
| FRA | Alizé Cornet | 24 | 2 |
| ITA | Camila Giorgi | 37 | 3 |
| SVK | Magdaléna Rybáriková | 47 | 4 |
| EST | Kaia Kanepi | 51 | 5 |
| ITA | Karin Knapp | 55 | 6 |
| BEL | Kirsten Flipkens | 57 | 7 |
| SVK | Anna Karolína Schmiedlová | 58 | 8 |

- ^{1} Rankings as of 23 March 2015.

=== Other entrants ===
The following players received wildcards into the main draw:

- (Poland) Magdalena Fręch
- (Poland) Urszula Radwańska

The following player used a protected ranking to gain entry into the singles main draw:

- (Russia) Vera Zvonareva

The following players received entry from the qualifying draw:

- (Poland) Magda Linette
- (Israel) Shahar Pe'er
- (Croatia) Petra Martić
- (Uzbekistan) Nigina Abduraimova

The following player received entry as a lucky loser:

- (Russia) Elizaveta Kulichkova

=== Withdrawals ===
Before the tournament

- (Russia) Vitalia Diatchenko →replaced by María Teresa Torró Flor
- (France) Océane Dodin (ear infection) →replaced by Elizaveta Kulichkova
- (Germany) Julia Görges →replaced by Denisa Allertová
- (Sweden) Johanna Larsson →replaced by Anna-Lena Friedsam
- (Czech Republic) Karolína Plíšková →replaced by An-Sophie Mestach
- (Italy) Francesca Schiavone →replaced by Misaki Doi

== WTA doubles main-draw entrants ==
=== Seeds ===
| Country | Player | Country | Player | Rank^{1} | Seed |
|---|---|---|---|---|---|
| POL | Klaudia Jans-Ignacik | FRA | Kristina Mladenovic | 55 | 1 |
| CZE | Klára Koukalová | CZE | Kateřina Siniaková | 125 | 2 |
| UKR | Lyudmyla Kichenok | UKR | Nadiia Kichenok | 146 | 3 |
| UKR | Yuliya Beygelzimer | CZE | Eva Hrdinová | 184 | 4 |

- ^{1} Rankings as of 23 March 2015.

=== Other entrants ===
The following pair received a wildcard into the main draw:

- (Poland) Magdalena Fręch / (Poland) Katarzyna Kawa

== Champions ==
=== Singles ===
- (Slovakia) Anna Karolína Schmiedlová def. (Italy) Camila Giorgi 6–4, 6–3

=== Doubles ===
- (Belgium) Ysaline Bonaventure / (Netherlands) Demi Schuurs def. (Italy) Gioia Barbieri / (Italy) Karin Knapp, 7–5, 4–6, [10–6]
