= 2015 Katowice Open – Singles =

Singles
- 2015 Katowice Open

Final
- Champion: (Slovakia) Anna Karolína Schmiedlová
- Runner-up: (Italy) Camila Giorgi
- Score: 6–4, 6–3

Events
Singles	Doubles
- Katowice Open

Alizé Cornet was the defending champion, but lost to Anna Karolína Schmiedlová in the quarterfinals.

Schmiedlová went on to win her first WTA title, defeating Camila Giorgi in the final, 6–4, 6–3. It was her first WTA Tour singles title.

== Seeds ==
1. (Poland) Agnieszka Radwańska (semifinals)
2. (France) Alizé Cornet (quarterfinals)
3. (Italy) Camila Giorgi (final)
4. (Slovakia) Magdaléna Rybáriková (first round)
5. (Estonia) Kaia Kanepi (second round)
6. (Italy) Karin Knapp (first round)
7. (Belgium) Kirsten Flipkens (quarterfinals)
8. (Slovakia) Anna Karolína Schmiedlová (champion)

== Draw ==
Key

- Q = Qualifier
- WC = Wild card
- LL = Lucky loser
- Alt = Alternate
- ITF = ITF entry
- PR = Protected ranking
- SR = Special ranking
- SE = Special exempt
- JE = Junior exempt
- JR = Junior Accelerator Programme entrant
- CO = College Accelerator Programme entrant
- NG = Next Gen Accelerator Program entrant
- w/o = Walkover
- r = Retired
- d = Defaulted

=== Finals ===
Semifinals
1	(Poland) Agnieszka Radwańska	4	2
3	(Italy) Camila Giorgi	6	6
(Belgium) Alison Van Uytvanck	4	1
8	(Slovakia) Anna Karolína Schmiedlová	6	6

Final
3	(Italy) Camila Giorgi	4	3
8	(Slovakia) Anna Karolína Schmiedlová	6	6

=== Top half ===
First round
1	(Poland) A Radwańska	6	6
(Belgium) Y Wickmayer	1	3
WC	(Poland) M Fręch	2	1
(Belgium) A-S Mestach	6	6
Q	(Croatia) P Martić	2	4
(Czech Republic) K Koukalová	6	6
PR	(Russia) V Zvonareva	7	6
6	(Italy) K Knapp	5	4
3	(Italy) C Giorgi	7	4	6
(Czech Republic) D Allertová	5	6	4
(Germany) A-L Friedsam	6^{5}	4
Q	(Poland) M Linette	7^{7}	6
WC	(Poland) U Radwańska	0	1
LL	(Russia) E Kulichkova	6	6
Q	(Israel) S Pe'er	1	2
5	(Estonia) K Kanepi	6	6

Second round
1	(Poland) A Radwańska	6	6
(Belgium) A-S Mestach	3	1
(Czech Republic) K Koukalová	6	6
PR	(Russia) V Zvonareva	1	4
3	(Italy) C Giorgi	6^{3}	6	6
Q	(Poland) M Linette	7^{7}	2	3
LL	(Russia) E Kulichkova	6	6
5	(Estonia) K Kanepi	1	2

Quarterfinals
1	(Poland) A Radwańska	6	6
(Czech Republic) K Koukalová	1	1
3	(Italy) C Giorgi	6	6
LL	(Russia) E Kulichkova	3	4

Semifinals
1	(Poland) A Radwańska	4	2
3	(Italy) C Giorgi	6	6

=== Bottom half ===
First round
7	(Belgium) K Flipkens	6	6
(Germany) A Beck	4	1
(Romania) M Niculescu	6	6
(France) K Mladenovic	4	4
(Czech Republic) T Smitková	2	2
(Germany) C Witthöft	6	6
(Belgium) A Van Uytvanck	6	6
4	(Slovakia) M Rybáriková	2	3
8	(Slovakia) AK Schmiedlová	6	4	6
Q	(Uzbekistan) N Abduraimova	1	6	1
(Spain) MT Torró Flor	6	5	2
(Czech Republic) K Siniaková	4	7	6
(Slovenia) P Hercog	6	3	6
(Japan) M Doi	0	6	2
(Netherlands) K Bertens	1	3
2	(France) A Cornet	6	6

Second round
7	(Belgium) K Flipkens	6^{6}	6	6
(Romania) M Niculescu	7^{8}	1	4
(Germany) C Witthöft	3	3
(Belgium) A Van Uytvanck	6	6
8	(Slovakia) AK Schmiedlová	6	3	6
(Czech Republic) K Siniaková	1	6	3
(Slovenia) P Hercog	6	1	3
2	(France) A Cornet	4	6	6

Quarterfinals
7	(Belgium) K Flipkens	2	4
(Belgium) A Van Uytvanck	6	6
8	(Slovakia) AK Schmiedlová	6	6
2	(France) A Cornet	2	0

Semifinals
(Belgium) A Van Uytvanck	4	1
8	(Slovakia) AK Schmiedlová	6	6

== Qualifying ==
=== Seeds ===
1. (Poland) Magda Linette (qualified)
2. (Israel) Shahar Pe'er (qualified)
3. (Netherlands) Richèl Hogenkamp (second round)
4. (Japan) Misa Eguchi (second round, withdrew)
5. (Russia) Elizaveta Kulichkova (qualifying competition, lucky loser)
6. (Belarus) Aliaksandra Sasnovich (qualifying competition)
7. (Uzbekistan) Nigina Abduraimova (qualified)
8. (Japan) Risa Ozaki (first round)

=== Qualifiers ===
1. (Poland) Magda Linette
2. (Israel) Shahar Pe'er
3. (Croatia) Petra Martić
4. (Uzbekistan) Nigina Abduraimova

=== Lucky losers ===
1. (Russia) Elizaveta Kulichkova

=== Draw ===
==== First qualifier ====
First round
WC	(Poland) Zuzanna Maciejewska	1	2
(Ukraine) Lyudmyla Kichenok	6	6
(Ukraine) Nadiia Kichenok	6	6
WC	(Poland) Olga Brózda	1	2
WC	(Poland) Joanna Zawadzka	6	2	0
5	(Russia) Elizaveta Kulichkova	4	6	6

Second round
1	(Poland) Magda Linette	6	4
(Ukraine) Lyudmyla Kichenok	1	0^{r}
(Ukraine) Nadiia Kichenok	2	7^{7}	3
5	(Russia) Elizaveta Kulichkova	6	6^{4}	6

Qualifying competition
1	(Poland) Magda Linette	6	5	7
5	(Russia) Elizaveta Kulichkova	4	7	5

==== Second qualifier ====
First round
(Netherlands) Indy de Vroome	5	2
(Bulgaria) Elitsa Kostova	7	6
(Sweden) Susanne Celik	7	6
(Georgia (country)) Oksana Kalashnikova	5	4
(Italy) Gioia Barbieri	4	7^{7}	4
6	(Belarus) Aliaksandra Sasnovich	6	6^{3}	6

Second round
2	(Israel) Shahar Pe'er	6	6
(Bulgaria) Elitsa Kostova	4	4
(Sweden) Susanne Celik	4	3
6	(Belarus) Aliaksandra Sasnovich	6	6

Qualifying competition
2	(Israel) Shahar Pe'er	6	7^{7}
6	(Belarus) Aliaksandra Sasnovich	3	6^{5}

==== Third qualifier ====
First round
3	(Netherlands) Richèl Hogenkamp	7	6
(Czech Republic) Tereza Martincová	5	4
(Italy) Alberta Brianti	6	4	1
(Croatia) Petra Martić	1	6	6
(Romania) Ana Bogdan	2	6	6
WC	(Poland) Katarzyna Kawa	6	2	0
(Poland) Justyna Jegiołka	5	6	6
8	(Japan) Risa Ozaki	7	2	3

Second round
3	(Netherlands) Richèl Hogenkamp	4	7^{7}	5
(Croatia) Petra Martić	6	6^{5}	7
(Romania) Ana Bogdan	7	6^{10}	7
(Poland) Justyna Jegiołka	5	7^{12}	5

Qualifying competition
(Croatia) Petra Martić	6	7^{7}
(Romania) Ana Bogdan	4	6^{5}

==== Fourth qualifier ====
First round
4	(Japan) Misa Eguchi	w/o
(Estonia) Anett Kontaveit
(Belgium) Ysaline Bonaventure	6^{7}	6	3
WC	(Czech Republic) Marie Bouzková	7^{9}	0	6
(Uzbekistan) Akgul Amanmuradova	3^{r}
WC	(Poland) Oliwia Szymczuch	4
(Czech Republic) Kateřina Vaňková	2	4
7	(Uzbekistan) Nigina Abduraimova	6	6

Second round
4	(Japan) Misa Eguchi
WC	(Czech Republic) Marie Bouzková	w/o
WC	(Poland) Oliwia Szymczuch	4	2
7	(Uzbekistan) Nigina Abduraimova	6	6

Qualifying competition
WC	(Czech Republic) Marie Bouzková	4	6	4
7	(Uzbekistan) Nigina Abduraimova	6	2	6
