= 2016 Katowice Open – Singles =

Singles
- 2016 Katowice Open

Final
- Champion: (Slovakia) Dominika Cibulková
- Runner-up: (Italy) Camila Giorgi
- Score: 6–4, 6–0

Events
Singles	Doubles
- Katowice Open

Anna Karolína Schmiedlová was the defending champion, but lost in the first round to Pauline Parmentier.

Dominika Cibulková won the title, defeating Camila Giorgi in the final, 6–4, 6–0.

== Seeds ==
1. (Poland) Agnieszka Radwańska (withdrew)
2. (Slovakia) Anna Karolína Schmiedlová (first round)
3. (Latvia) Jeļena Ostapenko (semifinals)
4. (France) Alizé Cornet (second round)
5. (Italy) Camila Giorgi (final)
6. (Ukraine) Lesia Tsurenko (first round)
7. (Hungary) Tímea Babos (quarterfinals)
8. (Slovakia) Dominika Cibulková (champion)
9. (Belgium) Kirsten Flipkens (quarterfinals)

== Draw ==
Key

- Q = Qualifier
- WC = Wild card
- LL = Lucky loser
- Alt = Alternate
- ITF = ITF entry
- PR = Protected ranking
- SR = Special ranking
- SE = Special exempt
- JE = Junior exempt
- JR = Junior Accelerator Programme entrant
- CO = College Accelerator Programme entrant
- NG = Next Gen Accelerator Program entrant
- w/o = Walkover
- r = Retired
- d = Defaulted

=== Finals ===
Semifinals
3	(Latvia) Jeļena Ostapenko	4	3
5	(Italy) Camila Giorgi	6	6
8	(Slovakia) Dominika Cibulková	7	6
(France) Pauline Parmentier	5	0

Final
5	(Italy) Camila Giorgi	4	0
8	(Slovakia) Dominika Cibulková	6	6

=== Top half ===
First round
3	(Latvia) J Ostapenko	6	6
Q	(Slovakia) D Hantuchová	1	1
(Czech Republic) Kr Plíšková	6	3	6
(United Kingdom) H Watson	2	6	4
Q	(Switzerland) V Golubic	6^{2}	6	6
WC	(Poland) P Kania	7^{7}	1	2
LL	(Czech Republic) J Malečková	3	5
7	(Hungary) T Babos	6	7
5	(Italy) C Giorgi	6	6
(Belarus) A Sasnovich	4	4
Q	(Russia) E Alexandrova	6	7^{7}
(Czech Republic) K Koukalová	0	6^{5}
(Romania) A Mitu	4	6	7
(Switzerland) R Oprandi	6	2	5
(Croatia) D Vekić	1	4
9	(Belgium) K Flipkens	6	6

Second round
3	(Latvia) J Ostapenko	6	6
(Czech Republic) Kr Plíšková	3	4
Q	(Switzerland) V Golubic	6	4	5
7	(Hungary) T Babos	1	6	7
5	(Italy) C Giorgi	4	6	6
Q	(Russia) E Alexandrova	6	2	4
(Romania) A Mitu	1	2
9	(Belgium) K Flipkens	6	6

Quarterfinals
3	(Latvia) J Ostapenko	7^{7}	2	6
7	(Hungary) T Babos	6^{3}	6	3
5	(Italy) C Giorgi	6	5	6
9	(Belgium) K Flipkens	2	7	4

Semifinals
3	(Latvia) J Ostapenko	4	3
5	(Italy) C Giorgi	6	6

=== Bottom half ===
First round
8	(Slovakia) D Cibulková	6^{6}	6	7^{7}
(Germany) C Witthöft	7^{8}	4	6^{3}
(Russia) E Kulichkova	7^{7}	6
WC	(Belarus) V Lapko	6^{4}	0
(Italy) F Schiavone	6	6
LL	(Ukraine) V Strakhova	4	3
Q	(Bulgaria) I Shinikova	2	7^{7}	3
4	(France) A Cornet	6	6^{5}	6
6	(Ukraine) L Tsurenko	4	0
(Switzerland) S Vögele	6	6
WC	(Ukraine) A Shoshyna	1	6^{5}
(Poland) M Linette	6	7^{7}
(Italy) K Knapp	7^{8}	4	4
(United Kingdom) N Broady	6^{6}	6	6
(France) P Parmentier	6	6
2	(Slovakia) AK Schmiedlová	2	0

Second round
8	(Slovakia) D Cibulková	6	7
(Russia) E Kulichkova	2	5
(Italy) F Schiavone	7^{7}	6
4	(France) A Cornet	6^{5}	1
(Switzerland) S Vögele	6	5	2
(Poland) M Linette	1	7	6
(United Kingdom) N Broady	4	5
(France) P Parmentier	6	7

Quarterfinals
8	(Slovakia) D Cibulková	7	6
(Italy) F Schiavone	5	1
(Poland) M Linette	2	4
(France) P Parmentier	6	6

Semifinals
8	(Slovakia) D Cibulková	7	6
(France) P Parmentier	5	0

== Qualifying ==
=== Seeds ===
1. (Ukraine) Kateryna Kozlova (qualifying competition)
2. (Switzerland) Viktorija Golubic (qualified)
3. (Czech Republic) Tereza Smitková (first round)
4. (Croatia) Jana Fett (first round)
5. (Romania) Ana Bogdan (first round)
6. (France) Amandine Hesse (second round)
7. (Luxembourg) Mandy Minella (first round, retired)
8. (France) Mathilde Johansson (first round)

=== Qualifiers ===
1. (Slovakia) Daniela Hantuchová
2. (Switzerland) Viktorija Golubic
3. (Russia) Ekaterina Alexandrova
4. (Bulgaria) Isabella Shinikova

=== Lucky losers ===
1. (Czech Republic) Jesika Malečková
2. (Ukraine) Valeriya Strakhova

=== Draw ===
==== First qualifier ====
First round
1	(Ukraine) Kateryna Kozlova	6	6
(Argentina) María Irigoyen	1	4
WC	(Poland) Wiktoria Kulik	1	3
WC	(Czech Republic) Markéta Vondroušová	6	6
(Slovakia) Daniela Hantuchová	6	6
WC	(Poland) Maja Chwalińska	0	2
(Italy) Nastassja Burnett	6	2	7
8	(France) Mathilde Johansson	2	6	5

Second round
1	(Ukraine) Kateryna Kozlova	7	7
WC	(Czech Republic) Markéta Vondroušová	5	5
(Slovakia) Daniela Hantuchová	6	6
(Italy) Nastassja Burnett	1	3

Qualifying competition
1	(Ukraine) Kateryna Kozlova	4	4
(Slovakia) Daniela Hantuchová	6	6

==== Second qualifier ====
First round
2	(Switzerland) Viktorija Golubic	6	6
(France) Virginie Razzano	3	2
(Russia) Polina Leykina	2	6^{2}
(Tunisia) Ons Jabeur	6	7^{7}
(France) Fiona Ferro	2	0^{r}
(Turkey) Başak Eraydın	6	3
(Poland) Katarzyna Piter	6^{3}	4
6	(France) Amandine Hesse	7^{7}	6

Second round
2	(Switzerland) Viktorija Golubic	6	6
(Tunisia) Ons Jabeur	2	4
(Turkey) Başak Eraydın	7^{7}	6
6	(France) Amandine Hesse	6^{5}	0

Qualifying competition
2	(Switzerland) Viktorija Golubic	6	6
(Turkey) Başak Eraydın	0	3

==== Third qualifier ====
First round
3	(Czech Republic) Tereza Smitková	2	6	2
(Russia) Valentyna Ivakhnenko	6	0	6
(Russia) Marina Melnikova	2	3
(Russia) Ekaterina Alexandrova	6	6
(Ukraine) Valeriya Strakhova	6	4	6
(Poland) Katarzyna Kawa	1	6	4
(Czech Republic) Barbora Štefková	6	7^{7}
5	(Romania) Ana Bogdan	4	6^{5}

Second round
(Russia) Valentyna Ivakhnenko	6	0	3
(Russia) Ekaterina Alexandrova	0	6	6
(Ukraine) Valeriya Strakhova	6	6
(Czech Republic) Barbora Štefková	3	4

Qualifying competition
(Russia) Ekaterina Alexandrova	6	6
(Ukraine) Valeriya Strakhova	3	1

==== Fourth qualifier ====
First round
4	(Croatia) Jana Fett	3	2
(Bulgaria) Isabella Shinikova	6	6
(Romania) Alexandra Cadanțu	0	6^{2}
(New Zealand) Marina Erakovic	6	7^{7}
WC	(Poland) Weronika Falkowska	6^{1}	4
(Czech Republic) Renata Voráčová	7^{7}	6
(Czech Republic) Jesika Malečková	6	1
7	(Luxembourg) Mandy Minella	0	0^{r}

Second round
(Bulgaria) Isabella Shinikova	6	3	6
(New Zealand) Marina Erakovic	4	6	1
(Czech Republic) Renata Voráčová	6^{4}	2
(Czech Republic) Jesika Malečková	7^{7}	6

Qualifying competition
(Bulgaria) Isabella Shinikova	6	6
(Czech Republic) Jesika Malečková	2	4
