= 2017 Aegon Classic Birmingham – Singles =

Singles
- 2017 Aegon Classic Birmingham

Final
- Champion: (Czech Republic) Petra Kvitová
- Runner-up: (Australia) Ashleigh Barty
- Score: 4–6, 6–3, 6–2

Details
- Draw: 32 (4 Q / 3 WC )
- Seeds: 8

Events
Singles	Doubles
← 2016 ·	Birmingham Classic	· 2018 →

Madison Keys was the defending champion, but withdrew with a wrist injury before the tournament began.

Petra Kvitová won the title, defeating Ashleigh Barty in the final, 4–6, 6–3, 6–2. This was Kvitová's first WTA title since recovering from injuries sustained during a home invasion.

== Seeds ==
1. (Germany) Angelique Kerber (withdrew because of a left hamstring injury)
2. (Ukraine) Elina Svitolina (second round)
3. (Slovakia) Dominika Cibulková (first round)
4. (United Kingdom) Johanna Konta (second round)
5. (France) Kristina Mladenovic (quarterfinals)
6. (Spain) Garbiñe Muguruza (semifinals)
7. (Czech Republic) Petra Kvitová (champion)
8. (Czech Republic) Barbora Strýcová (second round)
9. (Australia) Daria Gavrilova (quarterfinals)

== Draw ==
=== Key ===
- Q = Qualifier
- WC = Wild card
- LL = Lucky loser
- Alt = Alternate
- ITF = ITF entry
- PR = Protected ranking
- SR = Special ranking
- SE = Special exempt
- JE = Junior exempt
- JR = Junior Accelerator Programme entrant
- CO = College Accelerator Programme entrant
- NG = Next Gen Accelerator Program entrant
- w/o = Walkover
- r = Retired
- d = Defaulted

=== Finals ===
Semifinals
(Czech Republic) Lucie Šafářová	1	0^{r}
7/WC	(Czech Republic) Petra Kvitová	6	1
6	(Spain) Garbiñe Muguruza	6	4	3
(Australia) Ashleigh Barty	3	6	6

Final
7/WC	(Czech Republic) Petra Kvitová	4	6	6
(Australia) Ashleigh Barty	6	3	2

=== Top half ===
First round
3	(Slovakia) D Cibulková	7	6^{7}	5
(Czech Republic) L Šafářová	5	7^{9}	7
(United States) L Davis	1	6	6^{4}
(Japan) N Osaka	6	2	7^{7}
(Japan) N Hibino	5	5
(Czech Republic) K Siniaková	7	7
Q	(Chinese Taipei) S-w Hsieh	4	4
9	(Australia) D Gavrilova	6	6
5	(France) K Mladenovic	6	7^{7}
(China) Y Duan	3	6^{2}
(China) S Zhang	7	7
(Poland) M Linette	5	5
(France) A Cornet	6^{3}	0
WC	(United Kingdom) N Broady	7^{7}	6
LL	(Czech Republic) T Smitková	2	3
7/WC	(Czech Republic) P Kvitová	6	6

Second round
(Czech Republic) L Šafářová	6	6
(Japan) N Osaka	2	4
(Czech Republic) K Siniaková	5	6	4
9	(Australia) D Gavrilova	7	2	6
5	(France) K Mladenovic	6	7^{7}
(China) S Zhang	4	6^{3}
WC	(United Kingdom) N Broady	2	2
7/WC	(Czech Republic) P Kvitová	6	6

Quarterfinals
(Czech Republic) L Šafářová	6^{4}	6	7^{7}
9	(Australia) D Gavrilova	7^{7}	3	6^{5}
5	(France) K Mladenovic	4	6^{5}
7/WC	(Czech Republic) P Kvitová	6	7^{7}

Semifinals
(Czech Republic) L Šafářová	1	0^{r}
7/WC	(Czech Republic) P Kvitová	6	1

=== Bottom half ===
First round
6	(Spain) G Muguruza	6	3	6
Q	(Russia) E Kulichkova	3	6	4
(Croatia) D Vekić	2	6^{2}
(United States) A Riske	6	7^{7}
(United States) C McHale	4	2
(United States) C Vandeweghe	6	6
(Ukraine) L Tsurenko	3	6^{6}
4	(United Kingdom) J Konta	6	7^{8}
8	(Czech Republic) B Strýcová	6	6
(Kazakhstan) Y Putintseva	3	3
Q	(Czech Republic) M Vondroušová	5	6^{1}
(Australia) A Barty	7	7^{7}
Q	(Italy) C Giorgi	6	7^{7}
(Russia) N Vikhlyantseva	3	6^{4}
WC	(United Kingdom) H Watson	2	7	3
2	(Ukraine) E Svitolina	6	5	6

Second round
6	(Spain) G Muguruza	6	6
(United States) A Riske	1	4
(United States) C Vandeweghe	6	6
4	(United Kingdom) J Konta	1	3
8	(Czech Republic) B Strýcová	3	6	1
(Australia) A Barty	6	3	6
Q	(Italy) C Giorgi	6	4	6
2	(Ukraine) E Svitolina	4	6	2

Quarterfinals
6	(Spain) G Muguruza	4	6	0
(United States) C Vandeweghe	6	4	0^{r}
(Australia) A Barty	5
Q	(Italy) C Giorgi	2^{r}

Semifinals
6	(Spain) G Muguruza	6	4	3
(Australia) A Barty	3	6	6

== Qualifying ==
=== Seeds ===
1. (Czech Republic) Markéta Vondroušová (qualified)
2. (Italy) Camila Giorgi (qualified)
3. (Chinese Taipei) Hsieh Su-wei (qualified)
4. (United States) Sachia Vickery (qualifying competition)
5. (Russia) Elizaveta Kulichkova (qualified)
6. (Czech Republic) Tereza Smitková (qualifying competition, lucky loser)
7. (Turkey) İpek Soylu (qualifying competition)
8. (Croatia) Jana Fett (qualifying competition)

=== Qualifiers ===
1. (Czech Republic) Markéta Vondroušová
2. (Italy) Camila Giorgi
3. (Chinese Taipei) Hsieh Su-wei
4. (Russia) Elizaveta Kulichkova

=== Lucky loser ===
1. (Czech Republic) Tereza Smitková

=== Draw ===
==== First qualifier ====
First round
1	(Czech Republic) Markéta Vondroušová	6	6
(Japan) Shuko Aoyama	1	1
(Bulgaria) Aleksandrina Naydenova	6	6
(Bulgaria) Isabella Shinikova	3	4
(India) Ankita Raina	7^{8}	6
(United Kingdom) Katy Dunne	6^{6}	4
(Australia) Anastasia Rodionova	5	1
6	(Czech Republic) Tereza Smitková	7	6

Second round
1	(Czech Republic) Markéta Vondroušová	6	6
(Bulgaria) Aleksandrina Naydenova	4	4
(India) Ankita Raina	7	2	2
6	(Czech Republic) Tereza Smitková	5	6	6

Qualifying competition
1	(Czech Republic) Markéta Vondroušová	4	7	6
6	(Czech Republic) Tereza Smitková	6	5	3

==== Second qualifier ====
First round
2	(Italy) Camila Giorgi	7	6
WC	(United Kingdom) Emily Appleton	5	4
WC	(United Kingdom) Samantha Murray	7	3	4
(United States) Grace Min	5	6	6
(Australia) Lizette Cabrera	4	6	4
(Hungary) Fanny Stollár	6	1	6
(Ukraine) Dayana Yastremska	3	4
8	(Croatia) Jana Fett	6	6

Second round
2	(Italy) Camila Giorgi	6	7^{7}
(United States) Grace Min	0	6^{5}
(Hungary) Fanny Stollár	3	1
8	(Croatia) Jana Fett	6	6

Qualifying competition
2	(Italy) Camila Giorgi	6	6
8	(Croatia) Jana Fett	3	4

==== Third qualifier ====
First round
3	(Chinese Taipei) Hsieh Su-wei	1	7^{7}	6
(Switzerland) Conny Perrin	6	6^{5}	1
(Portugal) Michelle Larcher de Brito	6	6
(United States) Jacqueline Cako	3	4
Alt	(Poland) Alicja Rosolska	2	6	1
(Japan) Miyu Kato	6	4	6
(Ukraine) Olga Savchuk	4	4
7	(Turkey) İpek Soylu	6	6

Second round
3	(Chinese Taipei) Hsieh Su-wei	6	6
(Portugal) Michelle Larcher de Brito	4	2
(Japan) Miyu Kato	4	2
7	(Turkey) İpek Soylu	6	6

Qualifying competition
3	(Chinese Taipei) Hsieh Su-wei	6	6
7	(Turkey) İpek Soylu	3	3

==== Fourth qualifier ====
First round
4	(United States) Sachia Vickery	7^{7}	2	7
(Canada) Gabriela Dabrowski	6^{4}	6	5
WC	(United Kingdom) Jodie Burrage	1	7^{7}	4
(United Kingdom) Katie Boulter	6	6^{3}	6
(Czech Republic) Petra Krejsová	7^{7}	6
(United Kingdom) Tara Moore	6^{2}	3
WC	(United Kingdom) Katie Swan	6^{1}	3
5	(Russia) Elizaveta Kulichkova	7^{7}	6

Second round
4	(United States) Sachia Vickery	6	7^{7}
(United Kingdom) Katie Boulter	1	6^{4}
(Czech Republic) Petra Krejsová	4	6	1
5	(Russia) Elizaveta Kulichkova	6	3	6

Qualifying competition
4	(United States) Sachia Vickery	0	2
5	(Russia) Elizaveta Kulichkova	6	6
