= Katowice Open =

Women's tennis tournament in Poland

Defunct tennis tournament
- Founded: 2013
- Abolished: 2016
- Editions: 4
- Location: Katowice; Poland
- Venue: Spodek
- Category: WTA International
- Surface: Clay (i) (2013); Hard (i) (2014–2016)
- Draw: 32S/32Q/16D
- Prize money: $250,000
- Website: Official Website

Current champions
- Women's singles: (Slovakia) Dominika Cibulková
- Women's doubles: (Japan) Eri Hozumi (Japan) Miyu Kato

The Katowice Open was a professional women's tennis tournament played on an indoor hard court in Katowice, Poland and was held in April. The event was affiliated with the Women's Tennis Association (WTA), and was an International-level tournament on the WTA Tour. Katowice Open replaced the Danish Open beginning with the 2013 WTA Tour season. The official tournament ball was Babolat Roland Garros’. The organizer of the tournament was SOS Music company from Toruń, which had obtained the license from Octagon sport agency. Telewizja Polska had taken the television partnership of the event. The tournament was broadcast by TVP in April.

From 2014, the surface was changed from clay to hard.

Octagon chose to relocate the event to Biel/Bienne as the Ladies Open Biel Bienne beginning in 2017.

== Past finals ==
=== Singles ===
Year	Champions	Runners-up	Score
2013	(Italy) Roberta Vinci	(Czech Republic) Petra Kvitová	7–6^{(7–2)}, 6–1
2014	(France) Alizé Cornet	(Italy) Camila Giorgi	7–6^{(7–3)}, 5–7, 7–5
2015	(Slovakia) Anna Karolína Schmiedlová	(Italy) Camila Giorgi	6–4, 6–3
2016	(Slovakia) Dominika Cibulková	(Italy) Camila Giorgi	6–4, 6–0

=== Doubles ===
Year	Champions	Runners-up	Score
2013	(Spain) Lara Arruabarrena (Spain) Lourdes Domínguez Lino	(Romania) Raluca Olaru (Russia) Valeria Solovyeva	6–4, 7–5
2014	(Ukraine) Yuliya Beygelzimer (Ukraine) Olga Savchuk	(Czech Republic) Klára Koukalová (Romania) Monica Niculescu	6–4, 5–7, [10–7]
2015	(Belgium) Ysaline Bonaventure (Netherlands) Demi Schuurs	(Italy) Gioia Barbieri (Italy) Karin Knapp	7–5, 4–6, [10–6]
2016	(Japan) Eri Hozumi (Japan) Miyu Kato	(Russia) Valentyna Ivakhnenko (Russia) Marina Melnikova	3–6, 7–5, [10–8]
