= Alizé Cornet =

French tennis player (born 1990)

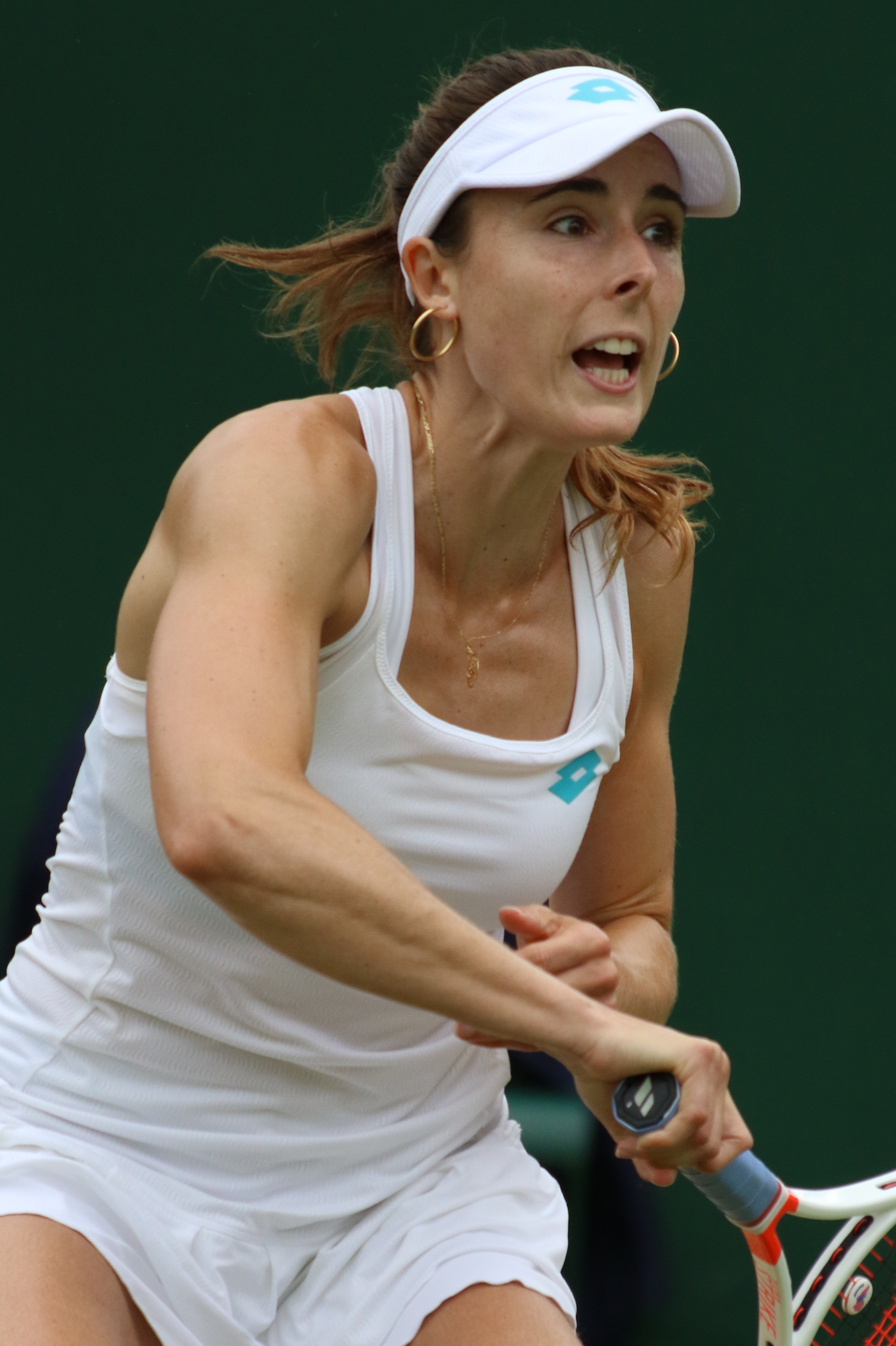
- Cornet at the 2019 Wimbledon Championships
- Country (sports): France
- Born: 22 January 1990 (age 36) Nice, France
- Height: 1.73 m (5 ft 8 in)
- Turned pro: 2006
- Retired: 2025
- Plays: Right-handed (two-handed backhand)
- Prize money: US$ 10,531,464

Singles
- Career record: 547–461
- Career titles: 6
- Highest ranking: No. 11 (16 February 2009)

Grand Slam singles results
- Australian Open: QF (2022)
- French Open: 4R (2015, 2017)
- Wimbledon: 4R (2014, 2022)
- US Open: 4R (2020)

Other tournaments
- Olympic Games: 3R (2008)

Doubles
- Career record: 121–159
- Career titles: 3
- Highest ranking: No. 59 (7 March 2011)

Grand Slam doubles results
- Australian Open: 3R (2014)
- French Open: 3R (2023)
- Wimbledon: 3R (2019)
- US Open: 2R (2013, 2021)

Other doubles tournaments
- Olympic Games: 2R (2021)

Grand Slam mixed doubles results
- Australian Open: QF (2009)
- French Open: QF (2014)
- Wimbledon: QF (2022)
- US Open: 2R (2013)

Team competitions
- Fed Cup: W (2019), record 11–23
- Hopman Cup: W (2014)
- Last updated on: 31 May 2024.

Alizé Cornet (French pronunciation: [alize kɔʁnɛ]; born 22 January 1990) is a French former professional tennis player. She has won six singles and three doubles titles on the WTA Tour, as well as three singles and three doubles titles on the ITF Circuit. On 16 February 2009, she reached her highest WTA singles ranking of world No. 11. Cornet has also made the second week at each of the four Grand Slam events, having reached the quarterfinals at the 2022 Australian Open, and the fourth round at the 2014 Wimbledon Championships, the 2015 and 2017 French Opens, and the 2020 US Open. She holds the record for the most consecutive Grand Slam appearances with 69 and also in third place for overall appearances with 72.

Cornet became known for defeating world No. 1 Serena Williams on three occasions in 2014. At the Dubai Tennis Championships she recorded a straight-sets win over Williams in the semifinals, which resulted in Cornet reaching her biggest singles final in almost six years. In July, at the Wimbledon Championships, she came back from a set down to upset Williams in the third round, handing the American her earliest exit at the tournament since 2005. Her third win came in the second round of Wuhan later that year, where Williams retired due to illness.

Cornet is responsible for ending the then No. 1 Iga Świątek's 37-match win streak in the third round of the 2022 Wimbledon Championships, the longest in the 21st century and tied for the 12th longest in the Open Era. It was Cornet's fourth win over a No. 1 ranked player.

Cornet also has an impressive junior record, reaching a career-high combined junior ranking of world No. 8, on 11 June 2007. She won her sole Grand Slam junior singles title at the 2007 French Open.

== Career ==
=== 2005–2007 ===
Cornet made her Grand Slam singles debut at the age of 15 in the 2005 French Open after receiving a singles main-draw wildcard. Coming into that tournament ranked only 645th in the world, she upset 71st-ranked Alina Jidkova in the first round before losing to No. 3 seed Amélie Mauresmo in the second round. At the 2006 French Open, she beat Virginia Ruano Pascual of Spain in the first round before losing to Tathiana Garbin in the second round. She could not repeat this performance at the 2007 French Open, where she lost in the first round to No. 26 seed Venus Williams. Cornet made her Wimbledon singles debut in 2007. At that tournament, she was defeated in the final qualifying round by Olga Govortsova, but made it to the main draw as a lucky loser when Li Na withdrew. Cornet defeated Maria Kirilenko the first round of the main draw before losing to the experienced No. 26 seed Ai Sugiyama in the second round in three sets. In 2007, Cornet won the $50k singles title in Dnipropetrovsk, beating Stefanie Vögele in the final. Cornet made her US Open singles debut in 2007. At that tournament, she defeated after three qualifying matches in the main draw No. 29 seed Samantha Stosur and unseeded Caroline Wozniacki in the first and second rounds, respectively, before losing to No. 3 seed, Jelena Janković.

=== 2008: First Premier-5 final, first WTA Tour titles ===
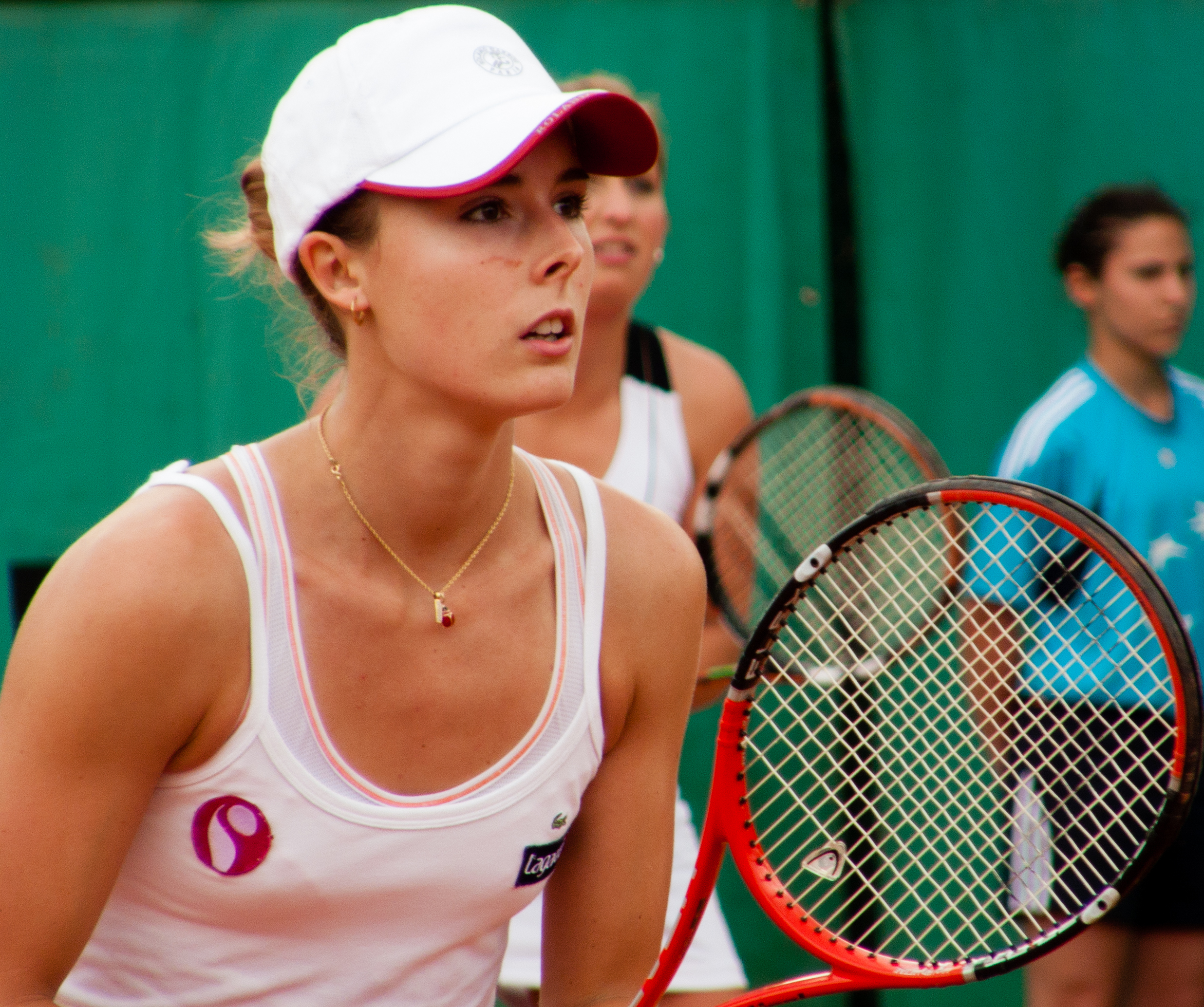
Cornet at the 2008 French Open

Cornet reached the second round of the Australian Open where she lost to ninth seed Daniela Hantuchová. Over the following months, Cornet experienced a great level of success on the main tour, particularly on clay, reaching the final in Acapulco and the semifinals in Amelia Island and Charleston (a Tier-I event). Cornet entered the Rome Masters and beat Vera Dushevina in the first round, Francesca Schiavone in the second, world No. 3 Svetlana Kuznetsova in the third, and then received a walkover from an injured Serena Williams to get into the semifinals. She defeated Anna Chakvetadze to reach her first Tier-I final where, however, she lost to Janković in two sets.

Due to her great run at Rome, she rose to No. 20 in the world and was seeded 19th for her home Grand Slam, the French Open. She defeated Julia Vakulenko in the first round after a stylish display. She then beat clay specialist Gisela Dulko in the second round but lost to 14th seed Agnieszka Radwańska in the third round.

She suffered a poor grass-court season, making first round exits at Eastbourne (to Amélie Mauresmo) and at Wimbledon, to Anastasia Pavlyuchenkova.

She won her first WTA title at Budapest. Cornet was seeded second and received a bye into the second round. Here she defeated Magdaléna Rybáriková, and followed it up with a straight-sets win over Anna-Lena Grönefeld in the quarterfinals. In the semifinal she defeated Gréta Arn, to make her third final of the year, which she won in two sets against Andreja Klepač. She capped it off by winning the doubles with Janette Husárová at the same tournament.

At Austria, she was seeded second. However, whilst 6–2, 2–1 up, she suffered an injury and retired when trailing 3–2 in the final set.

Cornet then competed at the Beijing Olympics. She was seeded 15th for the singles event, and defeated Nicole Vaidišová in the first round, Peng Shuai in the second, before falling to No. 4 seed Serena Williams in three sets. She also competed in the women's doubles with Virginie Razzano, where they lost in the first round. In New Haven, she was seeded seventh and again beat Vaidišová in the first round. Cornet followed it up by beating Katarina Srebotnik, and a win over second seeded Daniela Hantuchová in the quarterfinal. However, she lost in the semifinals to eventual champion Caroline Wozniacki.

At the US Open, she was seeded 17th in the singles event, where she reached the third round with wins over Camille Pin and Bethanie Mattek-Sands in the first and second rounds, respectively, before losing 4–6, 5–7 to Anna-Lena Grönefeld in the third.

=== 2009: Singles career-high ===
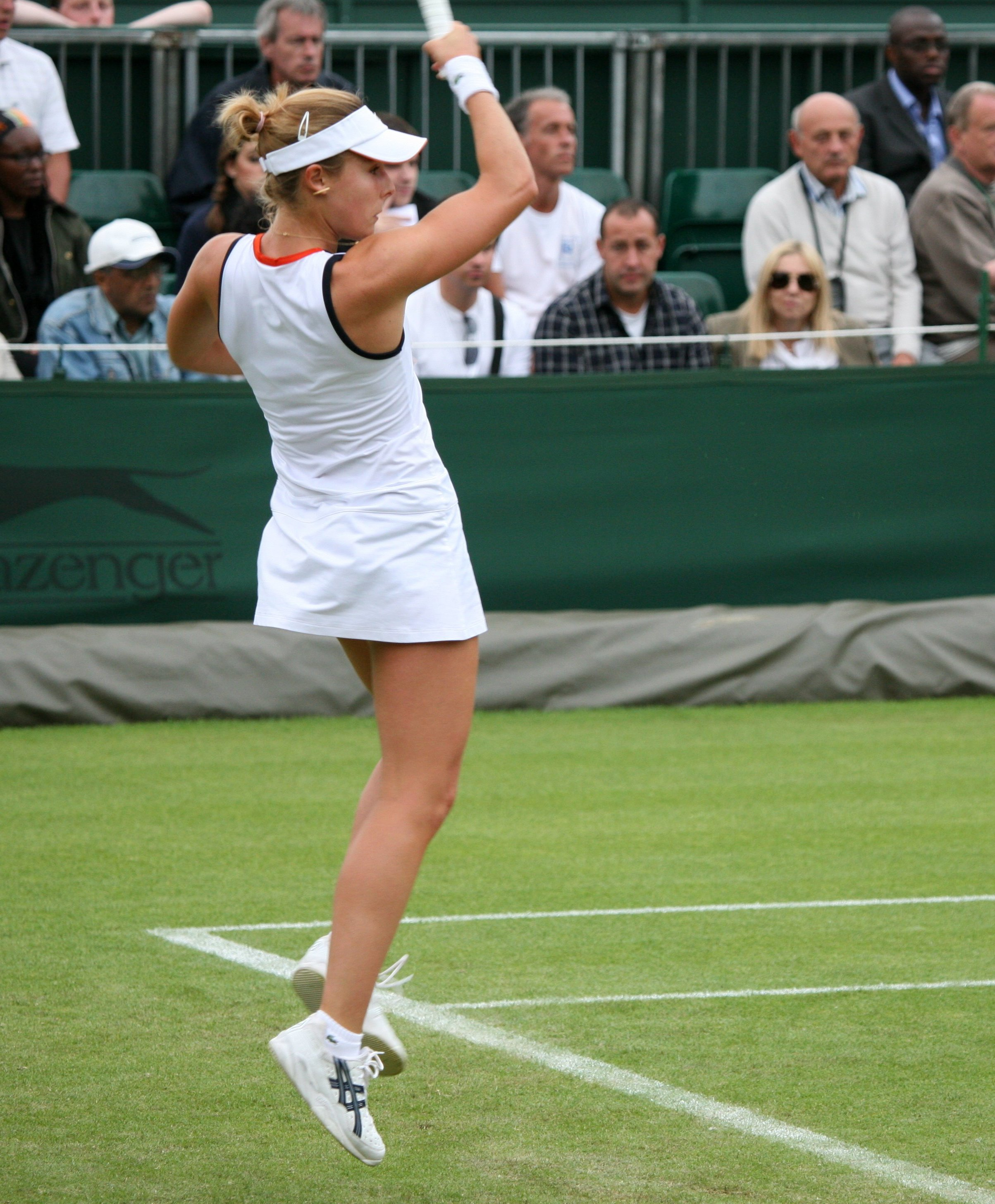
Cornet at the 2009 Wimbledon Championships

Cornet played at the Hopman Cup, and placed third in her group, partnering Gilles Simon. She defeated Hsieh Su-wei of Taiwan and Italian Flavia Pennetta. She then lost to Russia's Dinara Safina, 3–6, 2–6.

Cornet began the season at the Sydney International where she defeated seventh seed Nadia Petrova and Alisa Kleybanova before losing to second seed and eventual finalist Dinara Safina in the quarterfinals. Cornet entered the Australian Open as the 15th seed, easily winning her two matches. In the third round, she dropped a set against Daniela Hantuchová, but advanced regardless. In the fourth round, she held two match points against Safina, but was eventually ousted in three sets. This was her third loss to the Russian already that year.

Cornet then took part in the Open GdF Suez in Paris. Seeded fifth, she defeated Latvian qualifier Anastasija Sevastova in the first round and went on to again defeat Hantuchová in three tight sets in the second. She was then defeated by second seed Jelena Janković in the quarterfinal.

Despite having an impressive first month of the year, Cornet's results began to slide. She lost her two matches to Francesca Schiavone and Flavia Pennetta in the Fed Cup, playing for France. Her best result in her next seven tournaments were third round showings in Dubai and Miami. She would lose another two matches in the Fed Cup Play-offs, to Daniela Hantuchová and Dominika Cibulková.

Cornet fell in the early rounds in both the French Open and Wimbledon, continuing a dismal 2009 tennis season.

She was then defeated in the early rounds in Budapest and Palermo. After months of early losses, Cornet had a promising showing in Bad Gastein, advancing to the semifinals before losing to Raluca Olaru, a match in which Cornet had a 5–4 lead and serve for closing the match in the second set.

=== 2010: Second doubles title, loss of form ===
Cornet began the season at the Auckland Open in New Zealand, losing to Francesca Schiavone in the quarterfinals. She then suffered an early loss to Alona Bondarenko in Hobart. At the Australian Open in the opening round, she again lost to Schiavone. Over the next two months, poor results continued for the Frenchwoman. During this period, her most notable tournament was in Monterrey, Mexico, where she reached the quarterfinals.

During the European clay-court season, Cornet, as a qualifier in the Barcelona Open, lost to Timea Bacsinszky in the first round. Cornet reached her first semifinal of the season in Fes, Morocco, losing to Iveta Benešová. She had previously not dropped a set in her previous three matches at the tournament. At the Estoril Open in Portugal, home favourite Michelle Larcher de Brito beat Cornet in the first round. As a qualifier in the Madrid Open, she lost again to Schiavone, for the fourth time that year.

Cornet won her first tournament of the year in doubles at the Internationaux de Strasbourg, playing with Vania King. Cornet would lose to King in singles. At the French Open, 29th seed Anastasia Pavlyuchenkova defeated her in the first round 6–4, 6–2. Soon after, at an ITF event in Marseille, Cornet lost to 412th-ranked Caroline Garcia in three sets.

At Wimbledon, she lost in the first round to Raluca Olaru.

She then played on clay in the Budapest Grand Prix upsetting Timea Bacsinszky, before losing to eventual champion Ágnes Szávay in the quarterfinals. At the Prague Open, she fell to Patty Schnyder in the second round. Cornet reached her second semifinal of the year in Bad Gastein with a win over top seed and defending champion, Andrea Petkovic, where she lost to Julia Görges. At the US Open, she fell in the first round to 31st seed Kaia Kanepi, in three sets. So she had lost in the opening round at all four Grand Slam tournaments.

=== 2011: Career-high ranking in doubles ===
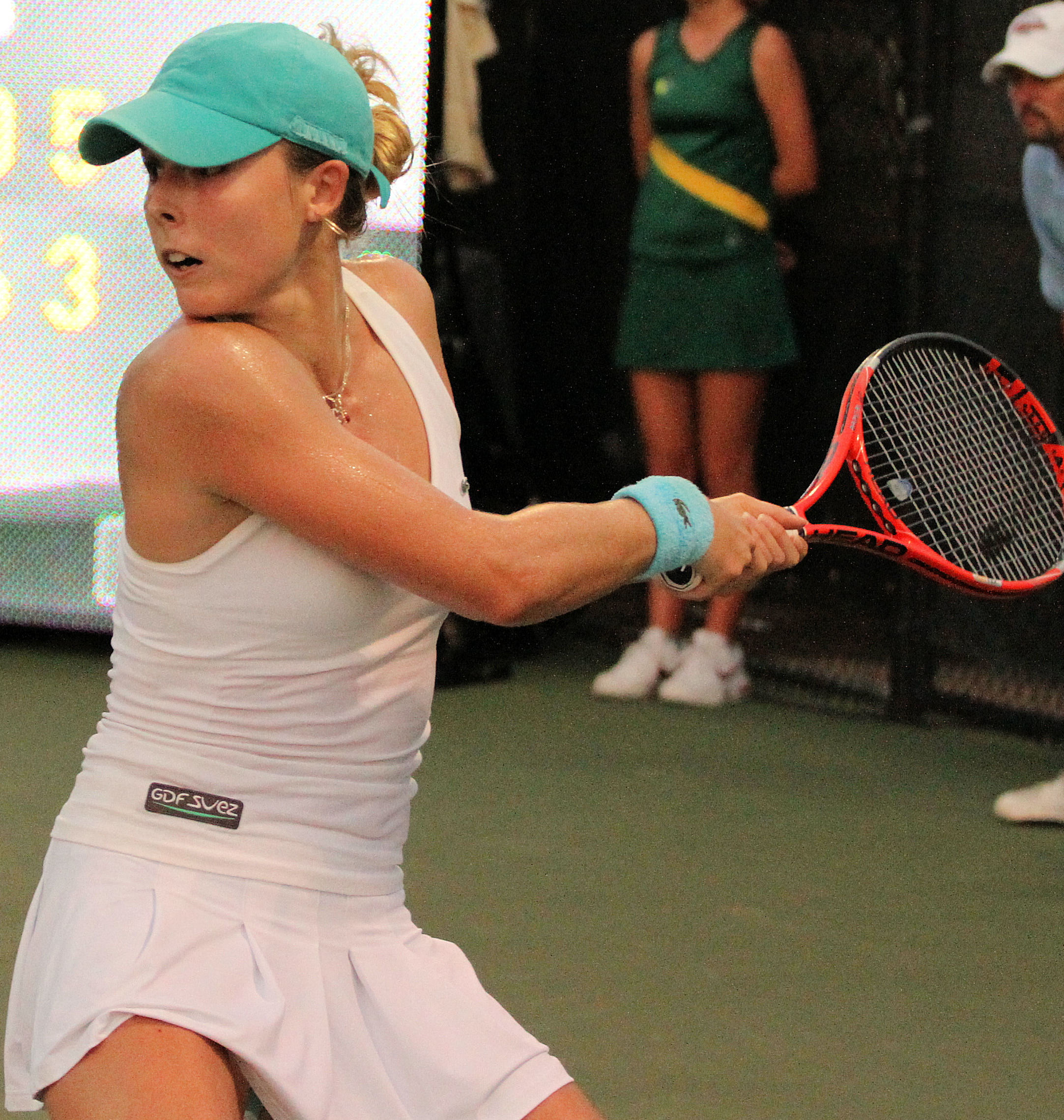
Cornet at the 2011 Texas Open

Cornet's first tournament was the Auckland Open. She defeated Sandra Záhlavová in the first round, before being swept aside by Julia Görges 6–2, 6–4. In Melbourne, she defeated CoCo Vandeweghe and 26th seed María José Martínez Sánchez in straight sets en route to the third round the Australian Open, where she was defeated by eventual champion Kim Clijsters.

Cornet then headed to Moscow for the quarterfinals of the Fed Cup against Russia. She defeated two-time Grand Slam champion Svetlana Kuznetsova in three sets for her biggest win in nearly a year and one of the biggest of her career. However, she lost her second singles match to Anastasia Pavlyuchenkova. In doubles, partnering Julie Coin, she lost to Pavlyuchenkova and Kuznetsova in straight sets.

Paris was Cornet's next destination. As the home favorite, her fans were greatly upset when she was sent crashing out to Sofia Arvidsson in the first round. At the same tournament she reached the semifinals with Virginie Razzano in doubles. As a result, she reached a career-high ranking of No. 59 in doubles on 7 March 2011. In singles, her bad run continued when she lost in the second round of the Monterrey Open to Anastasija Sevastova. But then, her form improved when she headed to Indian Wells. In the first round of qualifications she defeated Han Xinyun, followed by another win over Vesna Dolonts. In the first round of the main draw, she had a decisive two-sets victory over former top ten player Patty Schnyder, and backed it up by winning a tough match against 2010 Wimbledon semifinalist Tsvetana Pironkova in three sets, to advance to the third round, where she was sent crashing out of the tournament by fifth seed Francesca Schiavone in two sets.

At the Miami Open, she fell in the first round to Virginie Razzano. At the Family Circle Cup she again suffered an early elimination in the first round by Arvidsson, for the second time that year. Seeded eighth at the Morocco Open, Cornet was beaten by former world No. 1, Dinara Safina, in the second round. Cornet's disastrous run continued when she lost in the first qualifying rounds of the Madrid Open and the Italian Open. She then defeated Sania Mirza in the Internationaux de Strasbourg, before falling to Nadia Petrova in three sets in the second round. At the French Open, she defeated Renata Voráčová in the first round but was then crushed by qualifier Nuria Llagostera Vives in the second.

Cornet began her grass-court season in Birmingham, losing in the first round to 16th seed Alla Kudryavtseva. She then lost in the first round of qualifications at the Aegon International to home favorite Anne Keothavong. Following these losses, she headed to London for the Wimbledon Championships, losing in the first round to Kateryna Bondarenko. Cornet then reached the quarterfinals of an ITF event in Italy, losing to Stefanie Vögele.

She again lost in the first rounds of the Swedish Open and the Gastein Ladies to Caroline Wozniacki and Ksenia Pervak. And in Cincinnati, she was beaten in the first round of qualifying by Sofia Arvidsson.

Also at the Texas Open, Cornet was defeated in the first round by Julia Görges. Then she proceeded to the US Open where she saw better results than at the French Open and Wimbledon, by getting to the second round where she lost to Roberta Vinci. Cornet then played two ITF events, reaching the second round of one and the quarterfinals of the other. She qualified for the Kremlin Cup, but lost in the first round to Svetlana Kuznetsova. Her final tournaments of the year were two ITF events in France, of which she reached one first round and one semifinal.

=== 2012: First WTA Tour singles title in four years ===
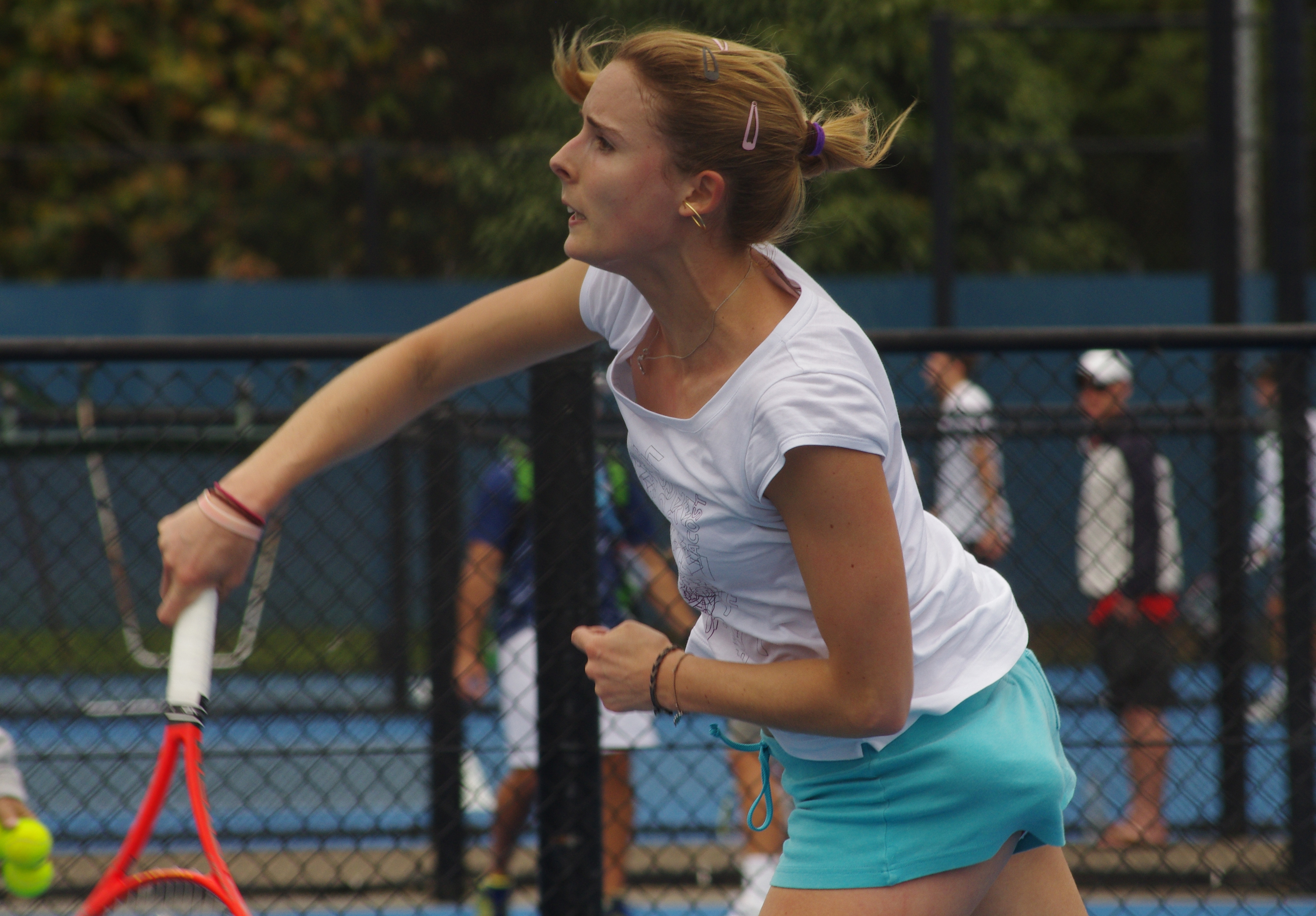
Cornet in 2012

Cornet began her 2012 season at the Auckland Open, losing in the first round of qualifying to wildcard Claire Feuerstein. Her next tournament was the Sydney International, where she was eliminated in the final round of qualifying by Chanelle Scheepers in straight sets. She also suffered an early first round loss at the Australian Open to Monica Niculescu. Cornet also played one Fed Cup singles match against Slovakia, losing to former world No. 5, Daniela Hantuchová, in straight sets.

Cornet was then awarded a wildcard for the Paris indoor event. Being the home favourite, her fans were greatly disappointed when she was knocked out of the tournament in the first round by eventual semifinalist Klára Zakopalová. Then, at the Monterrey Open, Cornet won her third match of the year against Tetiana Luzhanska in the first round, but was defeated by second seed Sara Errani in the second. She then fell in the first round of the Mexican Open to Alberta Brianti, in three sets.

Cornet's poor run continued when she fell in the qualifying of the Indian Wells Open. She then reached the final of the $100k Bahamas Open, where she lost to Aleksandra Wozniak. After that, she headed to the Miami Open, for which she qualified, but she went out in the first round to Shahar Pe'er. Cornet reached the second round at Stuttgart, after defeating Anna Chakvetadze before losing to Maria Sharapova. Cornet then reached the final at the Internationaux de Strasbourg which she lost to Francesca Schiavone. At the French Open, she lost to Zheng Jie in the first round.

Cornet then won the Bad Gastein tournament, her second singles title, defeating Yanina Wickmayer in the final. At Wimbledon, she lost in the second round to eventual quarterfinalist Tamira Paszek. At the London Olympics, she defeated Paszek in the first round before losing to Daniela Hantuchová. She competed in the women's doubles with Kristina Mladenovic. At the US Open, Cornet defeated wildcard Nicole Gibbs in the first round. In the following round, she lost to fifth seed Petra Kvitová. She reached the quarterfinals at Guangzhou, losing to Sorana Cîrstea in straight sets. Cornet then entered the Kremlin Cup, defeating Anastasia Rodionova in the first round, only to be defeated by Sam Stosur in the second round.

=== 2013: Steady results at the Grand Slam championships ===
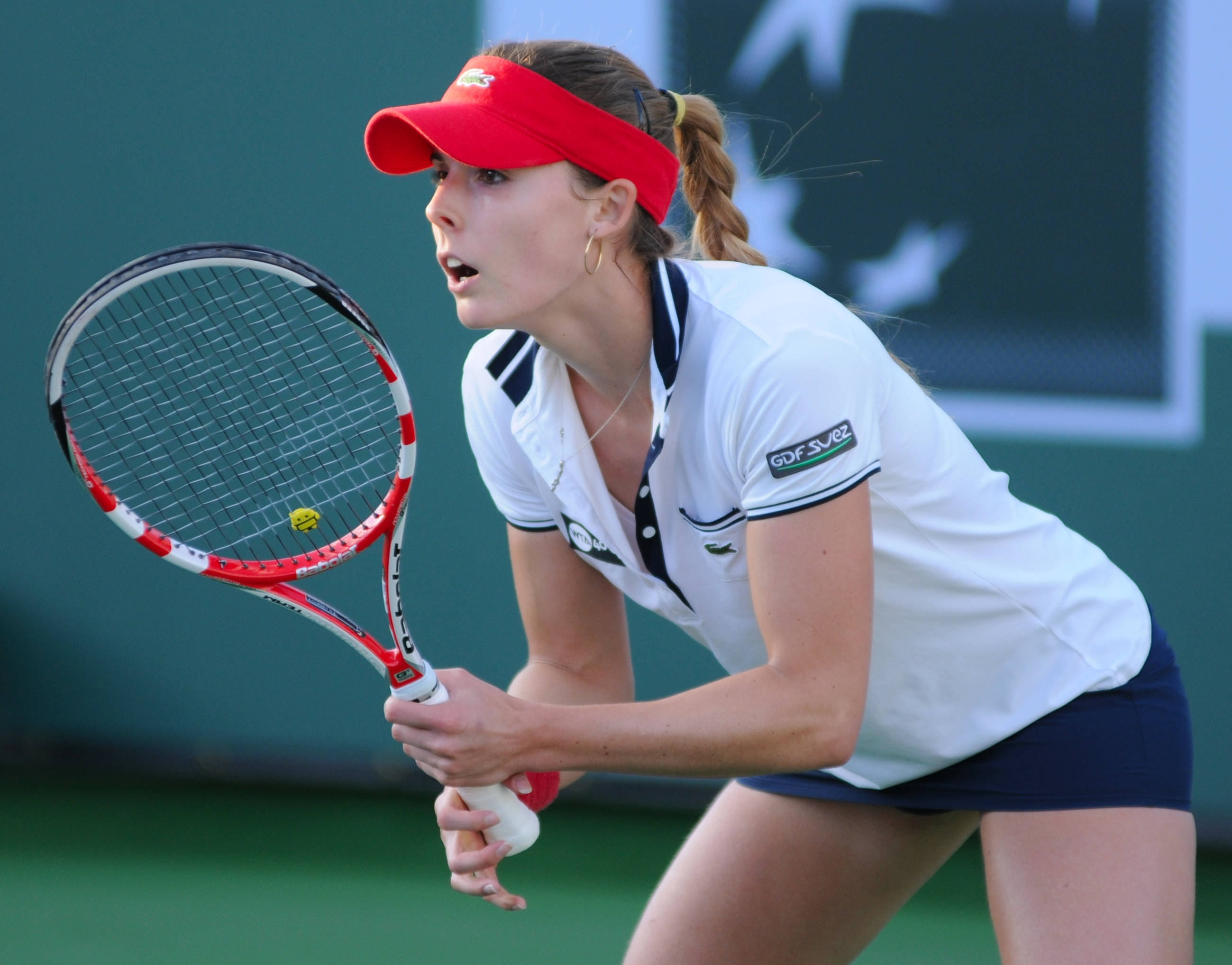
Cornet at the 2013 Indian Wells Open

She kicked off the new season by playing in the Brisbane International where she defeated Australian qualifier Bojana Bobusic in the first round. She drew world No. 3, Serena Williams, in the second round, and was defeated in two sets. The next week, Cornet played at the Hobart International, but was beaten in the first round by Chanelle Scheepers. In the first round of the Australian Open, she defeated Marina Erakovic of New Zealand in a marathon match lasting 3 hours and 28 minutes. Cornet drew Venus Williams in the second round, to whom she lost. She also played in the doubles tournament, partnering with German player Mona Barthel. They were, however, defeated in the first round by Alexandra Panova and Galina Voskoboeva.

Following the Australian Open, Cornet's WTA singles ranking climbed six places to No. 35. Her next tournament was the indoor event in Paris where Cornet drew the Swedish No. 1, Sofia Arvidsson, in the first round, and defeated her in three sets. However, she lost in the second round to Lucie Šafářová. Cornet did not fare well in doubles either, as she and her partner Kristina Mladenovic were defeated in the first round by 2013 Australian Open doubles champions Errani and Vinci.

Cornet began clay-court season at the Copa Colsanitas tournament in Colombia where she was defeated in the second round. She improved upon this performance in her next tournament, the Mexican Open, reaching the semifinals before being defeated by eventual champion Sara Errani. Next, she won the Internationaux de Strasbourg, defeating Lucie Hradecká in the final. Cornet entered the French Open playing some of her best tennis of the year, and advanced to the third round before being defeated by third-seeded Victoria Azarenka. On 24 June, she achieved a season-high ranking of No. 31.

At Wimbledon, Cornet advanced to the third round, a personal best for the tournament, but suffered a disappointing defeat by Flavia Pennetta there after winning the first set 6–0 and having match point in the second. During the US Open Series, she reached the semifinals at the Washington Open where she lost to Andrea Petkovic. Then, she recorded two consecutive third-round appearances at Toronto and Cincinnati where she lost to Sara Errani and Magdaléna Rybáriková, respectively. At the US Open, Cornet was seeded 26th and reached the third round, losing to Victoria Azarenka in three sets.

In September, Cornet played in Guangzhou as the second seed where she lost to Yvonne Meusburger in quarterfinals. She then suffered two first-round defeats at Tokyo and Beijing in the hands of Stosur and veteran Schiavone, respectively. At the Kremlin Cup, Cornet defeated Elina Svitolina in round one before succumbing to Stosur again. Her final tournament of 2013 was the Tournament of Champions, held in Sofia. She qualified for the first time as a result of winning the title in Strasbourg earlier and was the seventh seed. However, she lost in round-robin stage, managing just one win over Maria Kirilenko via retirement. Her other two losses came in the hands of Simona Halep and Anastasia Pavlyuchenkova. Cornet ended the year at No. 27, her highest since 2008.

=== 2014: Serena Williams' nemesis ===
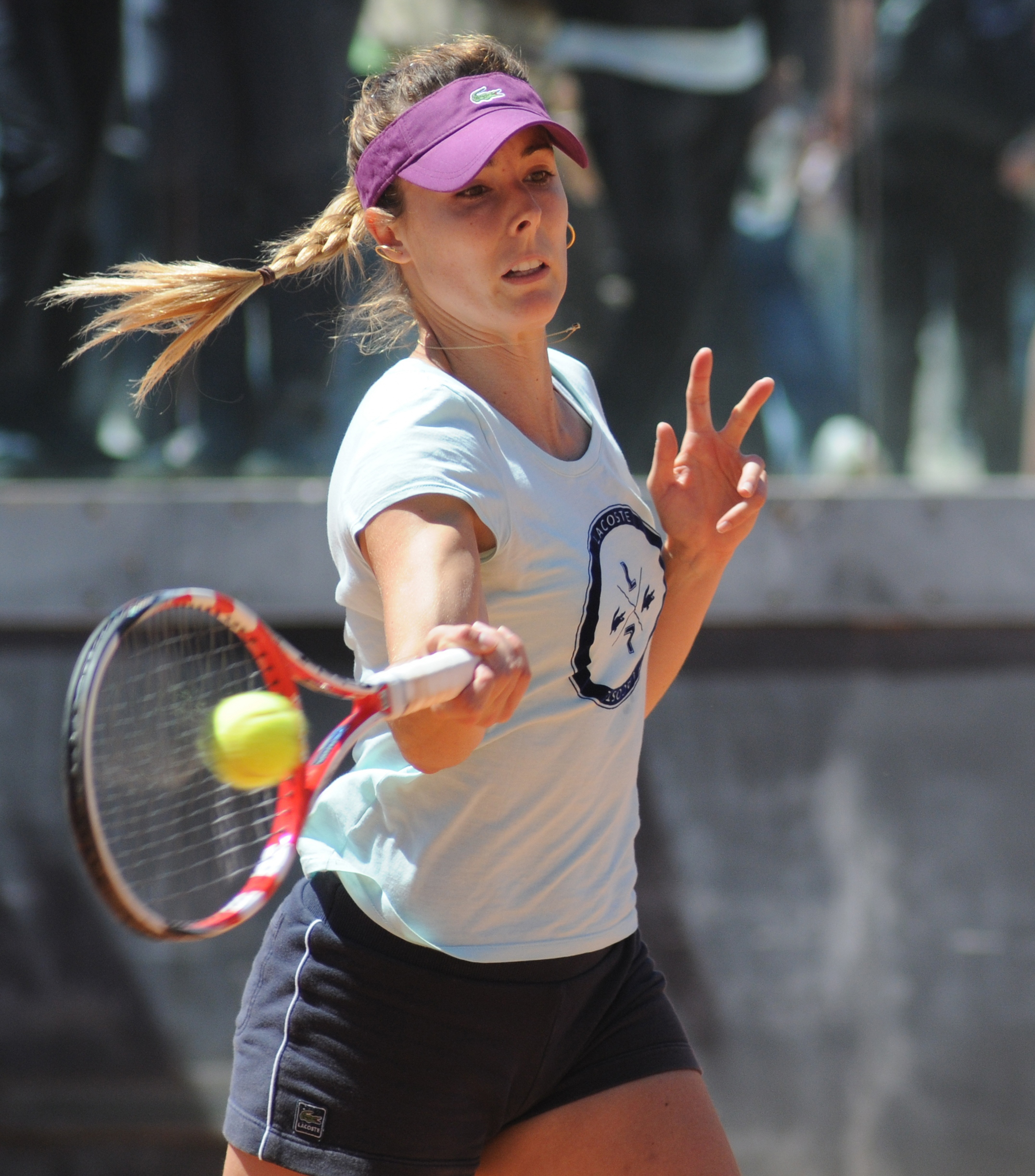
Cornet at the 2014 Italian Open

Cornet started the year ranked 26th. She teamed with Jo-Wilfried Tsonga to win the Hopman Cup for Team France. She lost to Maria Sharapova in the third round at the Australian Open. At the Dubai Championships, in what was the fourth match between them, Alize defeated world No. 1, Serena Williams, for the first time to reach the finals. However, also in a fourth match against the American, she lost in straight sets to world No. 44, Venus Williams, in the final. After Dubai, Cornet moved three places up the rankings, to No. 23. She defeated Camila Giorgi in April to win the Katowice Open, her fourth career title. She defeated Agnieszka Radwańska, the top seed en route to the final.

Cornet then competed at the Madrid Open where she faced Svetlana Kuznetsova in the first round but lost in three sets. She defeated Kirsten Flipkens in the first round at the Internazionali d'Italia but lost to Ana Ivanovic in the second round. Cornet was the defending champion at the Internationaux de Strasbourg but lost to Camila Giorgi in a tight three-setter in the first round. At the French Open, Cornet was seeded 20th, her highest seeding in more than four years. She defeated wildcard Ashleigh Barty easily in round one. She then faced American wildcard Taylor Townsend but lost in three roller coaster sets. Cornet dropped to the world No. 24 after the French Open.

Alizé kicked off her grass-court season by defeating Bojana Jovanovski in the first round at the Eastbourne International. She then faced fifth seeded Angelique Kerber but lost in three sets after winning the second set 6–1. Cornet was seeded 25th at Wimbledon and defeated WTA rising star Anna Schmiedlová in the first round. In the second round, she defeated Petra Cetkovská. In the third round, she faced Serena Williams and defeated her for the second time in a row. She played in the second week of a Grand Slam tournament for the first time in five years, her first at Wimbledon, and lost to 13th seed Eugenie Bouchard in the fourth round.

Cornet was the top seed at the Swedish Open but suffered a shocking defeat to Anett Kontaveit in the first round. Her clay-court season saw her accumulating just two wins and five losses. Cornet then participated in Washington where she was seeded third. She once again suffered an opening-round exit to rising American Shelby Rogers. At the Rogers Cup, Alize defeated American Lauren Davis in the first round. In the second round, she faced the eighth seed Victoria Azarenka and lost in three sets. The following week at Cincinnati, Cornet lost to young Madison Keys in the first round. She was the 22nd seed at the US Open and defeated Amandine Hesse and Daniela Hantuchová in her first two matches before succumbing to Lucie Šafářová.

In September, Cornet travelled to China for the Guangzhou Open. She was seeded second and was the sole seed to advance past the first round. She reached the final by defeating the likes of Yulia Putintseva, former champion Shahar Pe'er, Hsieh Su-wei and Timea Bacsinszky before falling to Monica Niculescu, in straight sets. Cornet competed in the Wuhan where she defeated Romina Oprandi in round one before recording her third straight over Serena Williams, this time via retirement. Cornet became the first player since Justine Henin in 2007 to win against Serena three times in a season. She then booked her place in the quarterfinals with a three-set win over Kirsten Flipkens. It was Cornet's first quarterfinal at a Premier-5-event. She then lost in the quarterfinal round to Eugenie Bouchard, the tournament's eventual runner-up.

=== 2015: Out of the top 40 in the year-end rankings ===
Cornet started her year by playing for France at the Hopman Cup. She won all three of her Group-B singles matches, beating Heather Watson of Great Britain, Casey Dellacqua of Australia, and Agnieszka Radwańska of Poland. Due to Jo-Wilfried Tsonga withdrawing from the Hopman Cup because of an arm injury, Cornet's mixed-doubles partner was Benoît Paire. They beat the Polish team Agnieszka Radwańska/Jerzy Janowicz (4–6 ret.) and the Australian team Casey Dellacqua/Marinko Matosevic (7–6, 7–5), but lost to the British duo Heather Watson/Andy Murray (4–6, 6–2, [8–10]). France did not qualify for the final as they finished Group B only in third position. At the Premier tournament in Sydney, Cornet lost in the first round to third seed Radwańska in straight sets.

For the whole of 2015, Cornet managed to advance beyond the last 16 of the singles main draw of a WTA Tour tournament only twice; she lost in the singles quarterfinals at the International tournaments in Katowice and Hong Kong.

=== 2016: Fifth singles title, Fed Cup final ===
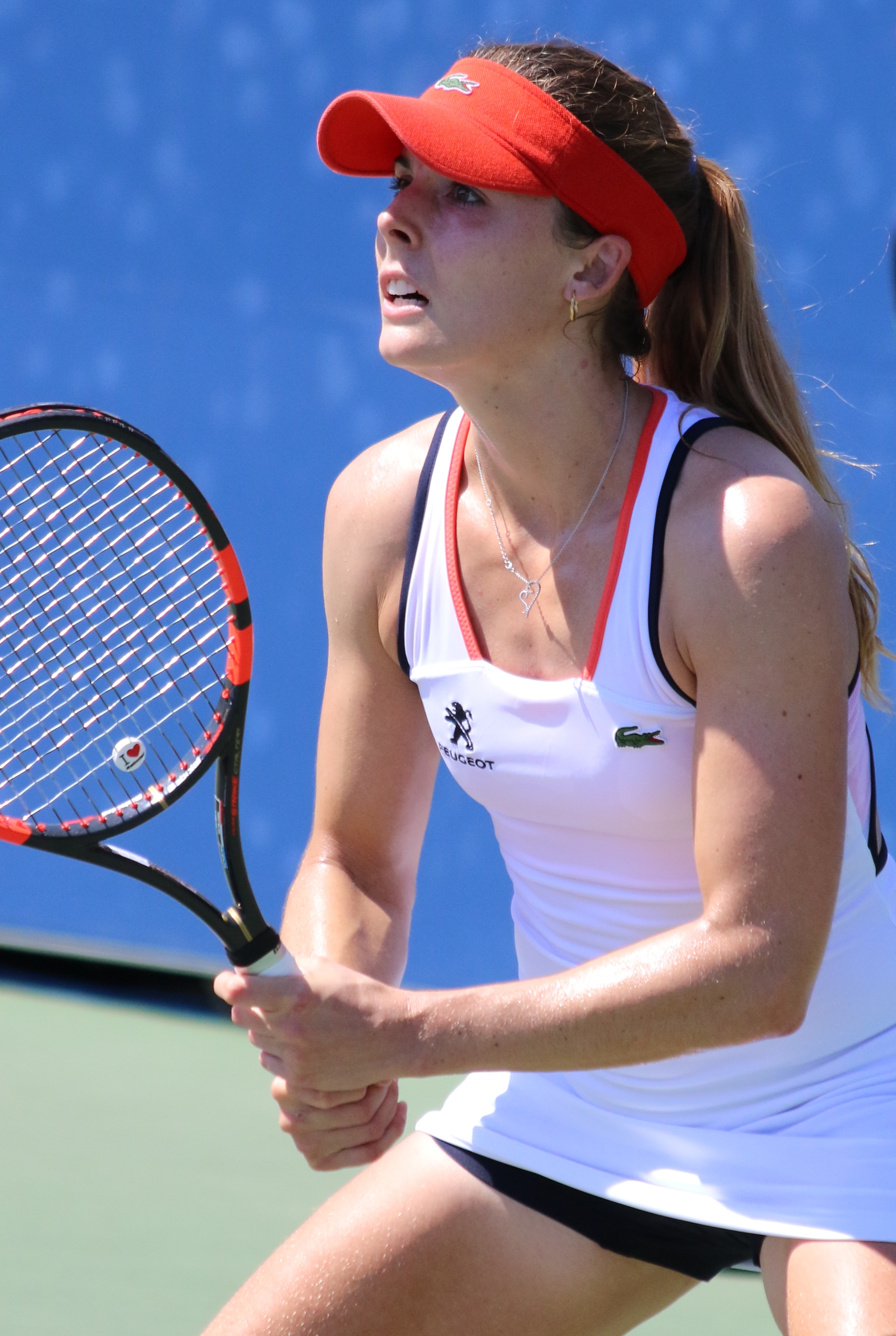
Cornet at the 2016 US Open

Cornet started her 2016 season at the Brisbane International where she lost in the second round to Anastasia Pavlyuchenkova. Seeded seventh at the Hobart International, Cornet won her fifth career singles title beating Eugenie Bouchard in the final. At the Australian Open, Cornet was defeated in the second round by qualifier Zhang Shuai.

In March, Cornet competed at the Miami Open. She lost in the second round to third seed and 2012 champion Agnieszka Radwańska. Seeded fourth at the Katowice Open, Cornet was defeated in the second round by Francesca Schiavone.

Starting her clay-court season at the Porsche Tennis Grand Prix, Cornet lost in the first round to Julia Görges. In Prague, Cornet fell in her first-round match to Czech wildcard Kateřina Siniaková. At the Madrid Open, Cornet was eliminated in the second round by fourth seed Victoria Azarenka. Competing in Rome, she lost her first-round match to Misaki Doi. Seeded ninth at the Internationaux de Strasbourg, Cornet was defeated in the first round by qualifier Alla Kudryavtseva. At the French Open, she reached the third round where she lost to ninth seed Venus Williams.

Cornet played just one tournament before Wimbledon. In Eastbourne, she was defeated in the first round by Caroline Wozniacki. Cornet lost in the third round at the Wimbledon Championships to ninth seed Madison Keys.

Seeded seventh at the Stanford Classic, Cornet was upset in the second round by Zheng Saisai. Competing at the Rogers Cup in Toronto, Cornet fell in her first-round match to Andrea Petkovic. Playing for France at the Summer Olympics, Cornet lost in the second round to top seed Serena Williams. Getting past qualifying at the Cincinnati Open, Cornet retired during her second-round match against ninth seed Carla Suárez Navarro. At the final grand slam of the year, the US Open, Cornet was defeated in the first round by Mirjana Lučić-Baroni.

Making it through qualifying at the Wuhan Open, Cornet lost in the first round to tenth seed and eventual finalist Dominika Cibulková.

=== 2017: First Premier final in doubles ===
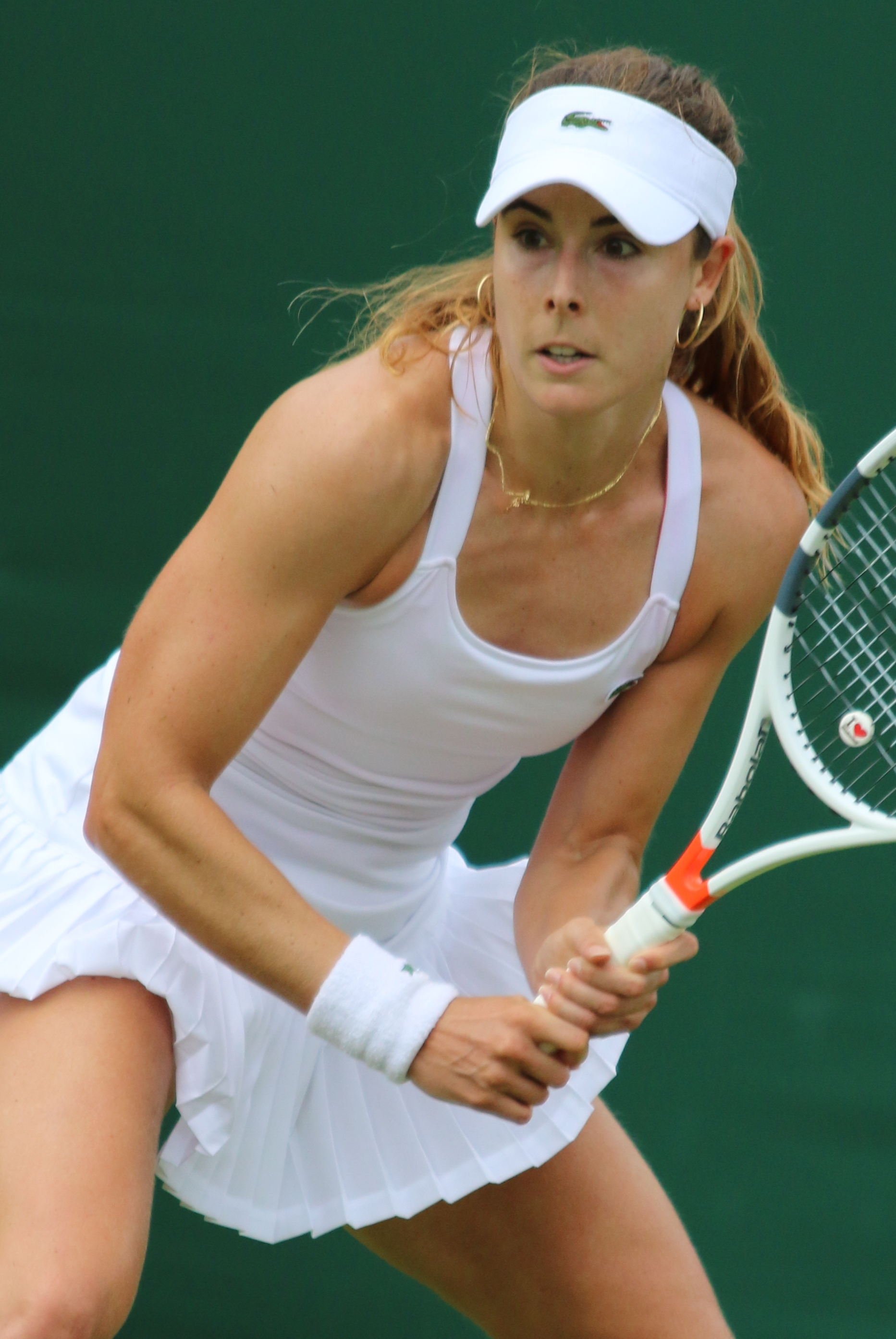
Cornet at the 2017 Wimbledon Championships

Cornet played her first tournament of the year at the Brisbane International. Being unseeded, she defeated No. 7 seed Elena Vesnina and Christina McHale in the first and second round respectively before causing a big upset in the quarterfinals by beating Dominika Cibulková, the No. 2 seed. Garbiñe Muguruza (seeded No. 4) retired after she was trailing Cornet 1–4 in the first set of the semifinal, enabling Cornet to reach the final (her second Premier career final), where she lost to No. 3 seed Karolína Plíšková 0–6, 3–6.

At the Australian Open, Cornet was seeded No. 28. She defeated French wildcard Myrtille Georges in the first round before losing to Maria Sakkari in the second.

Cornet played in the 2017 Fed Cup World Group quarterfinal tie against Switzerland, in which she lost the first singles match (her only match) to Timea Bacsinszky; France lost the tie 1–4.

On 16 February, Cornet withdrew from the Dubai Tennis Championships because of a torn pectoral muscle.

She lost to Carla Suárez Navarro in the quarterfinals of the Monterrey Open. She suffered early exits in the singles main draw of her next four WTA tournaments in Rabat (first round), Madrid (first round), Rome (second round) and Strasbourg (first round). At the French Open, she upset No. 20 seed Barbora Strýcová in the second round, No. 9 seed Agnieszka Radwańska in the third before losing to No. 28 seed Caroline Garcia in the fourth round. After the French Open, Cornet lost in the singles main-draw first round of the next five tournaments that she entered – Birmingham, Eastbourne, Wimbledon, Stanford and Toronto. She ended her five-singles match losing streak when she defeated CiCi Bellis in the first round of the Premier-5 tournament in Cincinnati before losing world No. 11, Dominika Cibulková, in the second round.

In the second half of September, Cornet reached consecutively the singles quarterfinals of two WTA Tour events – Guangzhou and Wuhan. At the Premier-5 tournament in Wuhan, she upset No. 6 seed Svetlana Kuznetsova in the second round before falling to the qualifier Maria Sakkari in the quarterfinals; that was just Cornet's third singles quarterfinal appearance in a Premier-Mandatory or Premier-5 tournament. In early October, the unseeded Cornet knocked out No. 10 seed Angelique Kerber in the second round of the Premier Mandatory China Open, before losing to her compatriot Caroline Garcia in the third round. In her last tournament of 2017 in Moscow, Cornet defeated No. 8 seed Magdaléna Rybáriková in the second round, before losing to Natalia Vikhlyantseva in the quarterfinals in a three-hour match, meaning that Cornet advanced beyond the singles quarterfinals of a WTA tournament only once (in Brisbane) in 2017.

=== 2018: Sixth singles title ===
On 11 January 2018, Cornet was charged by the ITF with missing three out-of-competition drugs tests that were to be conducted between November 2016 and October 2017. Under WADA rules, Cornet could face a suspension of up to two years. The case would be heard on 1 May 2018 in London. She would be allowed to play WTA and ITF tournaments until then, but if found guilty all prize money and rankings points accumulated during a certain period in 2017 would be forfeited. The French Tennis Federation stated that they would not select Cornet for the upcoming Fed Cup team tie against Belgium in February 2018, to allow her time to "prepare her defence" in front of an independent tribunal set up by WADA.

On 15 May, the ITF announced that the independent tribunal set up by WADA had cleared Cornet of the charge of missing the three out-of-competition drugs tests that were to be conducted between November 2016 and October 2017 because the Doping Control Officer (DCO) did not satisfy all of the requirements of article I.4.3 of the International Standard for Testing and Investigations in relation to the third missed drugs test. Specifically, the DCO did not do "what was reasonable in the circumstances (i.e. given the nature of the specified location) to try to locate Cornet, short of giving her any advance notice of the test". For that reason, the third missed drugs test declared against Cornet no longer stood.

On 22 July, she won her sixth career singles title at the Swiss Open, held in Gstaad.

At the US Open, Cornet was given a code violation under Grand Slam rules for changing her shirt while on the court. Some fans and players criticised the ruling as male players are allowed to change their shirts while on court. The WTA said the ruling was "not based on a WTA rule, as the WTA has no rule against a change of attire on court". The next day, tournament officials clarified the policy by saying that players of any gender would be allowed to change their shirt while sitting in their chair, and female players could also change their shirts in a private location off the court, for which they would not be assessed a bathroom break.

=== 2019: 13th singles final ===
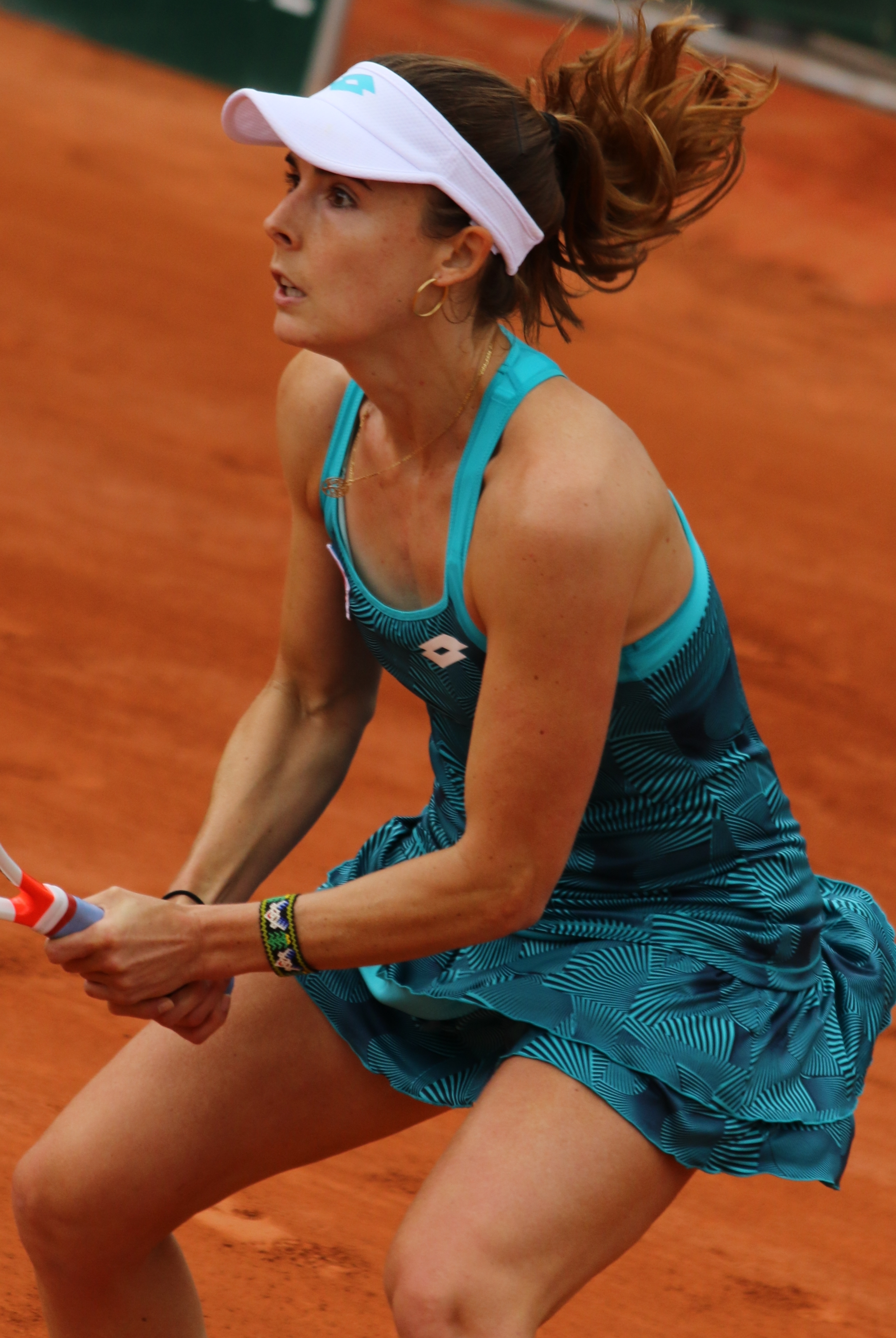
Cornet at the 2019 French Open

Cornet played for France at the Hopman Cup, alongside Lucas Pouille. She lost all her singles matches. France finished last in their group. In Hobart, the sixth-seeded Cornet won her first three matches in straight sets to reach the semifinals, where she lost to Sofia Kenin. At the Australian Open, Cornet was eliminated in the second round by Venus Williams.

Cornet lost in the first round at the St. Petersburg Ladies' Trophy to Anastasia Pavlyuchenkova. Playing for France in the Fed Cup tie against Belgium, Cornet played one match and won beating Elise Mertens. In the end, France won the tie 3–1. At the Dubai Championships, Cornet fell in her second-round match to Alison Riske.

At the Italian Open, Cornet won two qualifying matches to reach the singles main draw, where she defeated No. 9 seed and world No. 10, Aryna Sabalenka, in the first round and lost her second-round match against Carla Suárez Navarro. Cornet was suffering from an injured abductor muscle and retired from the match against Suárez Navarro when the latter was leading 6–3, 3–0.

=== 2020: US Open fourth round ===
Cornet began her 2020 season at the Auckland Open. She reached the quarterfinals where she retired against eventual finalist Jessica Pegula due to an upper-right thigh injury. Cornet lost in the second round at the Hobart International to third seed and eventual champion Elena Rybakina. At the Australian Open, she was defeated in the second round by 19th seed Donna Vekić.

Coming through qualifying at the St. Petersburg Ladies' Trophy, Cornet fell in her second-round match to sixth seed Maria Sakkari. Seeded fourth at the first edition of the Lyon Open, she made it to the second round where she lost to Camila Giorgi.

Due to the COVID-19 pandemic, many of the WTA tournaments were cancelled. Cornet returned to action in August at the Cincinnati Open. She stunned second seed Sofia Kenin in the second round. She was defeated in the third round by eventual champion, Victoria Azarenka. Cornet then made her first second week at the US Open in September, after reaching the fourth round, completing the sweep of second-week appearances at each of the four Grand Slam events. There, she lost to Tsvetana Pironkova.

Competing at the Internationaux de Strasbourg, Cornet was defeated in the second round by fifth seed and eventual finalist, Elena Rybakina. At the French Open, Cornet lost her second-round encounter to Zhang Shuai.

Cornet ended the year ranked No.53.

=== 2021: Fourth Olympics participation, two top-10 wins ===
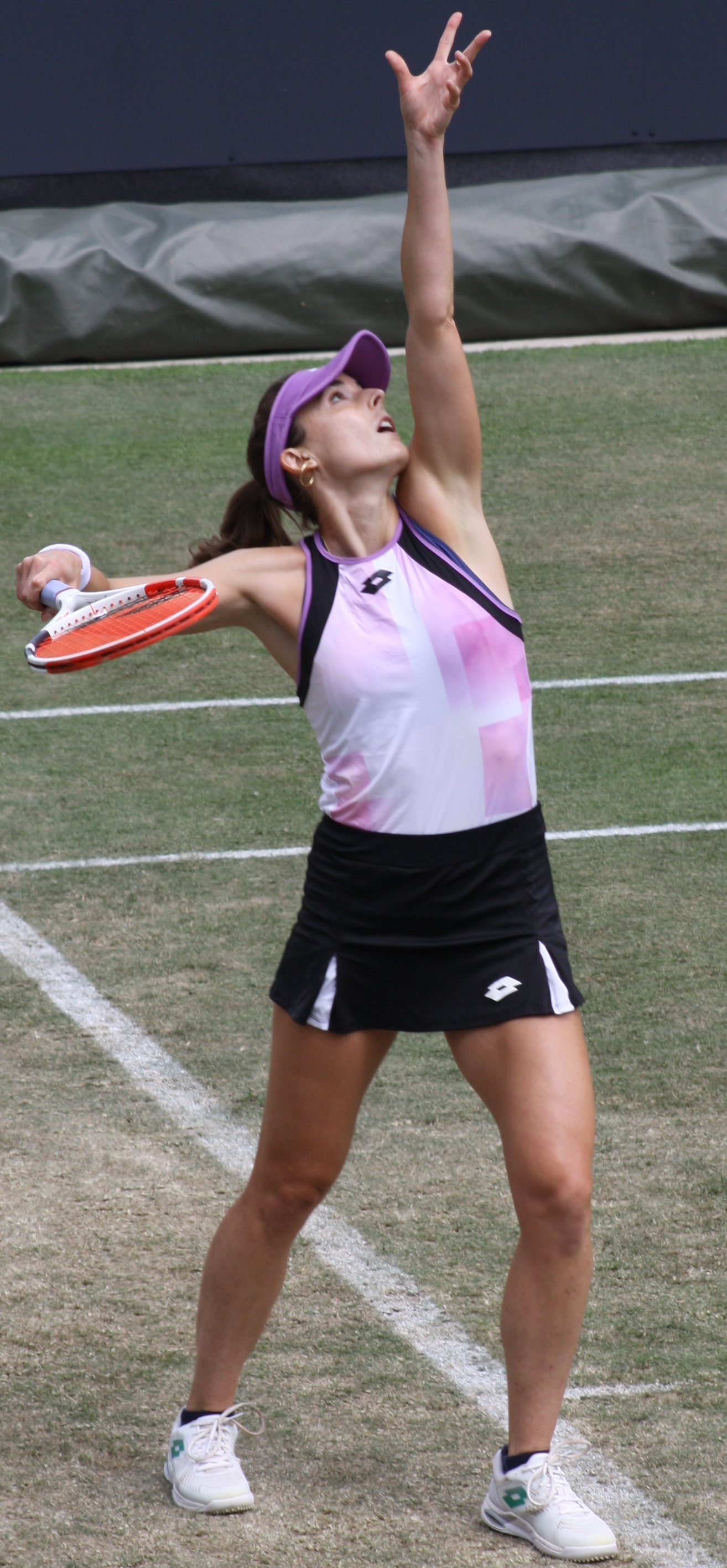
Cornet at the 2021 Bad Homburg Open

Cornet started her 2021 season in January at the first edition of the Abu Dhabi Open where she lost in the second round to Paula Badosa. She was defeated in the second round of the first edition of the Gippsland Trophy by second seed Naomi Osaka. At the Australian Open, she lost in the second round to Ann Li. Seeded 15th at the first edition of the Phillip Island Trophy, Cornet was defeated in the first round by Australian wildcard Kimberly Birrell.

Seeded fifth at the Lyon Open, she lost in round one to compatriot Clara Burel. Competing at the Dubai Tennis Championships, Cornet was defeated in her second-round match by third seed Aryna Sabalenka. In Miami, she reached the second round where she lost to ninth-seeded Petra Kvitová.

Beginning her clay-court season at the Charleston Open, Cornet made it to the third round where she was defeated by 12th seed Ons Jabeur. Seeded fourth at the first edition of the MUSC Health Open, she retired from her first-round match against wildcard Linda Fruhvirtová due to injury. As the top seed at the Open de Saint-Malo, she fell in the first round to fellow French Océane Dodin.

In June at the beginning of grass-court season at the German Open, Cornet reached the semifinals defeating third seed Bianca Andreescu (her first top-10 win for 2021) and sixth seed Garbiñe Muguruza in a tight three-set match en route. She lost to Belinda Bencic in the semifinal. She defeated fifth seeded Andreescu again at Wimbledon, in the first round, her second top-10 win for the year.

In August, Cornet participated in the first edition of the Chicago Women's Open reaching the final where she lost to Elina Svitolina. In October, she lost in the second round at Indian Wells to Leylah Fernandez, in straight sets.

=== 2022: Major quarterfinal ===
Cornet reached the quarterfinals of the Australian Open, defeating Bulgarian qualifier Viktoriya Tomova, world No. 3 Garbiñe Muguruza, 29th seed Tamara Zidanšek, and 14th seed Simona Halep en route. This was Cornet's first major quarterfinal appearance, finally reaching the last eight on her 63rd attempt. However, she lost her quarterfinal match to Danielle Collins.

With her participation in 2022 Wimbledon, Cornet tied the record set by Ai Sugiyama of 62 consecutive Grand Slam appearances. In the third round, she upset world No. 1, Iga Świątek, and ended her 37 match winning streak. This marked the second time she beat the reigning world No. 1 at Wimbledon (after Serena Williams in 2014). In the fourth round, Cornet lost to Ajla Tomljanović in a three-set match lasting 2 hours and 34 minutes.

In the first round of the 2022 US Open, making her record 63rd consecutive major appearance, she stunned the defending champion, Emma Raducanu, in straight sets. Next, she defeated Kateřina Siniaková but lost to Danielle Collins in the third round, in straight sets.

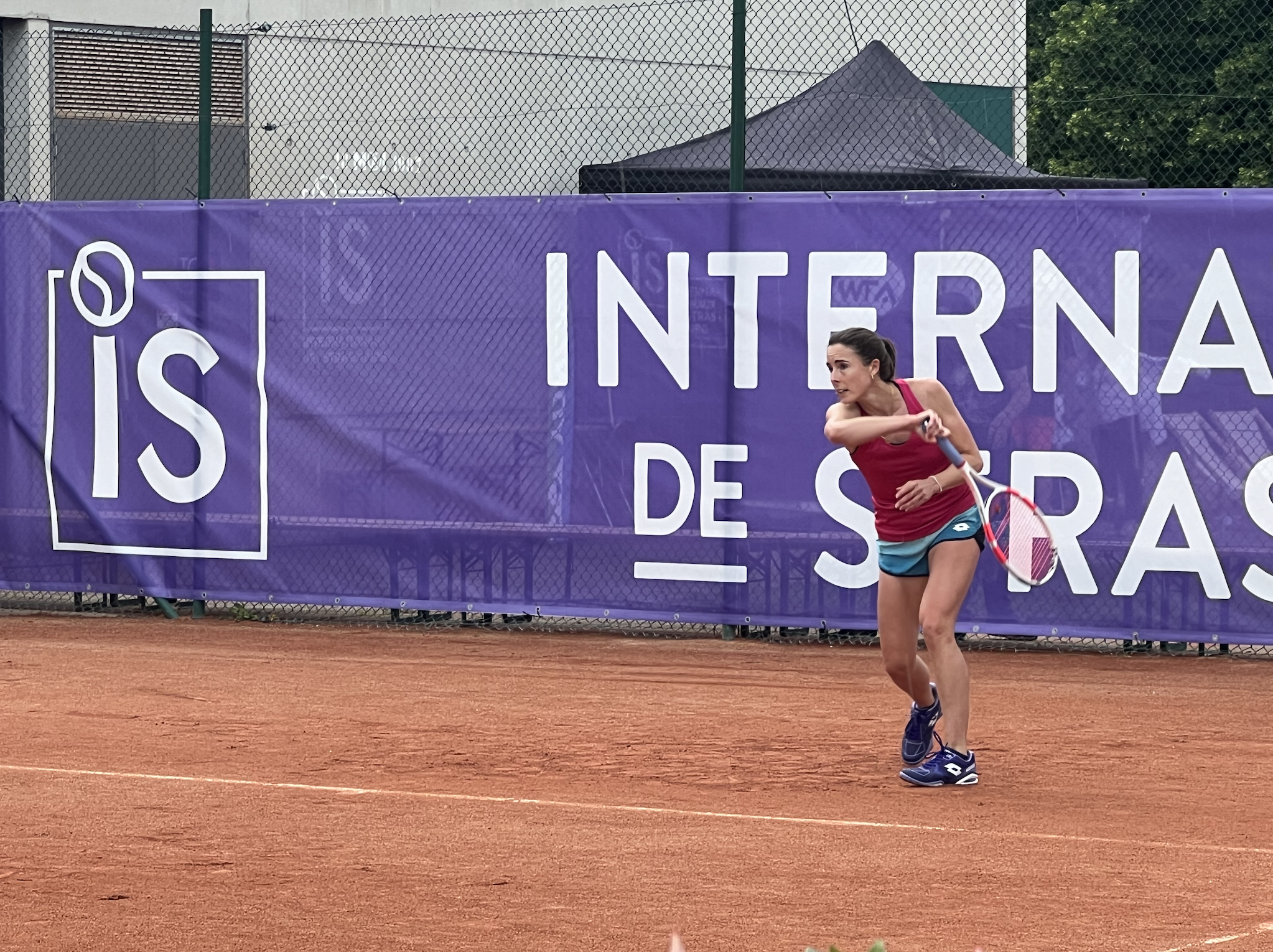
Cornet bidding farewell to Strasbourg in 2024.

=== 2024: Record 69th consecutive appearance, retirement ===
On 27 April 2024, Cornet announced her intention to retire from professional tennis after the 2024 French Open.

In May 2024, Cornet announced her retirement from tennis after Roland Garros, where she received a wildcard. She played her last singles match against Zheng Qinwen in the first round. It was an Open Era record marking her 69th consecutive major appearance.

=== 2025: Brief comeback and second retirement ===
In March 2025, Cornet announced her comeback to the WTA Tour at the 2025 Open de Rouen where she received a wildcard, but withdrew before the tournament.

She made her comeback at the WTA 125K in La Bisbal d'Empordà in Spain where she reached the quarterfinal. She then entered the main draw of the 2025 Internationaux de Strasbourg with a wildcard.

In June, Cornet entered the qualifying rounds at Wimbledon but failed to reach the main draw, losing in the final round to fellow French player Elsa Jacquemot.

Cornet announced her definitive retirement from professional tennis in September 2025, following her appearance at the 2025 Open Internacional de San Sebastián. She cited other work projects, including joining the RMC's Les Grandes Gueules du sport team and being a consultant for beIN Sports, as the reason.

== Apparel and equipment ==
From the beginning of her professional career in 2005 Cornet was endorsed by Lacoste whilst typically wearing Asics shoes, but from 2018 onward she has worn Lotto clothing and shoes. She uses Babolat racquets, specifically endorsing the Pure Strike range of racquets.

== Career statistics ==
=== Grand Slam tournament performance timeline ===
Key
W	F	SF	QF	#R	RR	Q#	DNQ	A	NH

(W) winner; (F) finalist; (SF) semifinalist; (QF) quarterfinalist; (#R) rounds 4, 3, 2, 1; (RR) round-robin stage; (Q#) qualification round; (DNQ) did not qualify; (A) absent; (NH) not held; (SR) strike rate (events won / competed); (W–L) win–loss record.
To avoid confusion and double counting, these charts are updated at the conclusion of a tournament or when the player's participation has ended.

==== Singles ====
Tournament	2005	2006	2007	2008	2009	2010	2011	2012	2013	2014	2015	2016	2017	2018	2019	2020	2021	2022	2023	2024	2025	SR	W–L	Win%
Australian Open	A	1R	1R	2R	4R	1R	3R	1R	2R	3R	3R	2R	2R	3R	2R	2R	2R	QF	1R	1R	A	0 / 19	22–19	54%
French Open	2R	2R	1R	3R	2R	1R	2R	1R	3R	2R	4R	3R	4R	2R	1R	2R	1R	3R	1R	1R	A	0 / 20	21–20	51%
Wimbledon	A	A	2R	1R	1R	1R	1R	2R	3R	4R	2R	3R	1R	1R	1R	NH	2R	4R	2R	A	Q3	0 / 16	15–16	48%
US Open	A	A	3R	3R	2R	1R	2R	2R	3R	3R	1R	1R	2R	1R	2R	4R	1R	3R	1R	A	A	0 / 17	18–17	51%
Win–loss	1–1	1–2	3–4	5–4	5–4	0–4	4–4	2–4	7–4	8–4	6–4	5–4	5–4	3–4	2–4	5–3	2–4	11–4	1–4	0–2	0–0	0 / 72	76–72	51%

==== Doubles ====
Tournament	2006	2007	2008	2009	2010	2011	2012	2013	2014	2015	2016	2017	2018	2019	2020	2021	2022	2023	SR	W–L
Australian Open	A	A	1R	2R	1R	1R	1R	1R	3R	1R	1R	2R	1R	3R	1R	A	1R	1R	0 / 15	6–15
French Open	1R	1R	2R	1R	2R	1R	1R	1R	1R	2R	2R	1R	1R	2R	1R	A	A	3R	0 / 16	7–16
Wimbledon	A	A	1R	1R	A	1R	1R	2R	2R	1R	2R	1R	1R	3R^{†}	NH	A	2R	A	0 / 12	6–11
US Open	A	A	1R	1R	1R	A	1R	2R	1R	1R	1R	1R	1R	1R	A	2R	1R	1R	0 / 14	2–14
Win–loss	0–1	0–1	1–4	1–4	1–3	0–3	0–4	2–4	3–4	1–4	2–4	1–4	0–4	5–3	0–2	1–1	1–3	2–3	0 / 57	21–56

Notes

- ^{†} Cornet and Petra Martić withdrew before their third-round match at the 2019 Wimbledon, and the result is not counted as a loss.

== Open Era record ==
Time span	Record accomplished	#	Players matched
2007 Australian Open – 2024 French Open	Most consecutive Grand Slam main draw appearances	69	Stands alone
