= 1998 IPB Czech Indoor – Doubles =

Doubles
- 1998 IPB Czech Indoor

Final
- Champions: (Germany) Nicolas Kiefer (Germany) David Prinosil
- Runners-up: (South Africa) David Adams (Czech Republic) Pavel Vízner
- Score: 6–4, 6–3

Events
Singles	Doubles
- IPB Czech Indoor

The 1998 IPB Czech Indoor was a men's tennis tournament played on indoor carpet in Ostrava, Czech Republic that was part of the International Series of the 1998 ATP Tour. It was the fifth edition of the tournament and was held from 19 October – 25 October.

== Seeds ==
Champion seeds are indicated in bold text while text in italics indicates the round in which those seeds were eliminated.

1. (Australia) Sandon Stolle / (Czech Republic) Cyril Suk (quarterfinals)
2. Unknown (withdrew)
3. (United States) Donald Johnson / (United States) Francisco Montana (quarterfinals)
4. (Russia) Yevgeny Kafelnikov / (Czech Republic) Daniel Vacek (semifinals)

== Draw ==
Key

- Q = Qualifier
- WC = Wild card
- LL = Lucky loser
- Alt = Alternate
- ITF = ITF entry
- PR = Protected ranking
- SR = Special ranking
- SE = Special exempt
- JE = Junior exempt
- JR = Junior Accelerator Programme entrant
- CO = College Accelerator Programme entrant
- NG = Next Gen Accelerator Program entrant
- w/o = Walkover
- r = Retired
- d = Defaulted

=== Finals ===
First round
1	(Australia) **S Stolle** **(Czech Republic) C Suk**	3	**6**	**6**
(Croatia) S Hiršzon (Croatia) G Ivanišević	**6**	3	2
(Germany) **N Kiefer** **(Germany) D Prinosil**	**6**	**6**
(Ukraine) A Medvedev (Russia) M Safin	2	3
4	(Russia) **Y Kafelnikov** **(Czech Republic) D Vacek**	**6**	**6**
(Czech Republic) J Novák (Czech Republic) D Rikl	1	3
(Zimbabwe) **B Black** **(South Africa) P Norval**	4	**6**	**6**
(South Africa) M Barnard (Russia) A Olhovskiy	**6**	0	3
(Sweden) **J Johansson** **(Sweden) M Tillström**	**7**	**6**
(Zimbabwe) W Black (Netherlands) F Wibier	6	2
3	(United States) **D Johnson** **(United States) F Montana**	**6**	**6**
(Finland) T Ketola (Czech Republic) T Anzari	4	2
(Sweden) **N Kulti** **(Australia) D Macpherson**	**6**	**6**
(North Macedonia) A Kitinov (South Africa) P Rosner	2	4
(South Africa) **D Adams** **(Czech Republic) P Vízner**	**6**	**6**
(Czechoslovakia) M Damm (United States) J Grabb	3	4

Quarterfinals
1	(Australia) S Stolle (Czech Republic) C Suk	3	4
(Germany) **N Kiefer** **(Germany) D Prinosil**	**6**	**6**
4	(Russia) **Y Kafelnikov** **(Czech Republic) D Vacek**	**6**	**7**
(Zimbabwe) B Black (South Africa) P Norval	3	5
(Sweden) **J Johansson** **(Sweden) M Tillström**	5	**6**	**6**
3	(United States) D Johnson (United States) F Montana	**7**	4	2
(Sweden) N Kulti (Australia) D Macpherson	1	6
(South Africa) **D Adams** **(Czech Republic) P Vízner**	**6**	**7**

Semifinals
(Germany) **N Kiefer** **(Germany) D Prinosil**	**7**	**6**
4	(Russia) Y Kafelnikov (Czech Republic) D Vacek	5	0
(Sweden) J Johansson (Sweden) M Tillström	2	1
(South Africa) **D Adams** **(Czech Republic) P Vízner**	**6**	**6**

Final
(Germany) **N Kiefer** **(Germany) D Prinosil**	**6**	**6**
(South Africa) D Adams (Czech Republic) P Vízner	4	3
