= 1994 IPB Czech Indoor – Doubles =

Doubles
- 1994 IPB Czech Indoor

Final
- Champions: (Czech Republic) Martin Damm (Czech Republic) Karel Nováček
- Runners-up: (South Africa) Gary Muller (South Africa) Piet Norval
- Score: 6–4, 1–6, 6–3

Events
Singles	Doubles
- Ostrava Open

In the first edition of the tournament, Martin Damm and Karel Nováček won the title by defeating Gary Muller and Piet Norval 6–4, 1–6, 6–3 in the final.

== Seeds ==
1. (Netherlands) Tom Nijssen / (Czech Republic) Cyril Suk (quarterfinals)
2. (South Africa) Gary Muller / (South Africa) Piet Norval (final)
3. (Czech Republic) Martin Damm / (Czech Republic) Karel Nováček (champions)
4. (Germany) Marc-Kevin Goellner / (Italy) Diego Nargiso (first round)

== Draw ==
Key

- Q = Qualifier
- WC = Wild card
- LL = Lucky loser
- Alt = Alternate
- ITF = ITF entry
- PR = Protected ranking
- SR = Special ranking
- SE = Special exempt
- JE = Junior exempt
- JR = Junior Accelerator Programme entrant
- CO = College Accelerator Programme entrant
- NG = Next Gen Accelerator Program entrant
- w/o = Walkover
- r = Retired
- d = Defaulted

=== Draw ===
First round
1	(Netherlands) T Nijssen (Czech Republic) C Suk	7	6
WC	(Czech Republic) D Fiala (Czech Republic) J Pelikán	5	2
(United Kingdom) J Bates (Czech Republic) D Rikl	6	6
WC	(Czech Republic) T Krupa (Czech Republic) P Vízner	2	2
3	(Czech Republic) M Damm (Czech Republic) K Nováček	6	6
WC	(Czech Republic) S Doseděl (United States) MV Washington	1	2
(France) R Gilbert (France) S Simian	3	7	4
(South Africa) E Ferreira (United States) D Randall	6	5	6
(United States) M Bauer (South Africa) B Talbot	3	3
Q	(Czech Republic) J Kodeš Jr. (Czech Republic) T Anzari	6	6
(Czech Republic) V Flégl (Netherlands) J Siemerink	4	7	7
4	(Germany) MK Goellner (Italy) D Nargiso	6	6	6
(Mexico) J Lozano (United States) B Pearce	3	3
(France) O Delaître (France) G Raoux	6	6
(United States) S Cannon (Belgium) L Pimek	5	4
2	(South Africa) G Muller (South Africa) P Norval	7	6

Quarterfinals
1	(Netherlands) T Nijssen (Czech Republic) C Suk	3	4
(United Kingdom) J Bates (Czech Republic) D Rikl	6	6
3	(Czech Republic) M Damm (Czech Republic) K Nováček	7	6
(South Africa) E Ferreira (United States) D Randall	5	3
Q	(Czech Republic) J Kodeš Jr. (Czech Republic) T Anzari	6	6
(Czech Republic) V Flégl (Netherlands) J Siemerink	3	2
(France) O Delaître (France) G Raoux	7	3	5
2	(South Africa) G Muller (South Africa) P Norval	6	6	7

Semifinals
(United Kingdom) J Bates (Czech Republic) D Rikl	1	4
3	(Czech Republic) M Damm (Czech Republic) K Nováček	6	6
Q	(Czech Republic) J Kodeš Jr. (Czech Republic) T Anzari	3	3
2	(South Africa) G Muller (South Africa) P Norval	6	6

Final
3	(Czech Republic) M Damm (Czech Republic) K Nováček	6	1	6
2	(South Africa) G Muller (South Africa) P Norval	4	6	3
