= 1996 IPB Czech Indoor =

- Date: 14–20 October
- Edition: 3rd
- Category: World Series
- Draw: 32S / 16D
- Prize money: $450,000
- Surface: Carpet / indoor
- Location: Ostrava, Czech Republic
- Venue: ČEZ Aréna

Champions

Singles
- (Germany) David Prinosil

Doubles
- (Australia) Sandon Stolle / (Czech Republic) Cyril Suk
- IPB Czech Indoor

The 1996 IPB Czech Indoor was a men's tennis tournament played on indoor carpet courts at the ČEZ Aréna in Ostrava in the Czech Republic and was part of the World Series of the 1996 ATP Tour. The tournament ran from 14 October through 20 October 1996. Unseeded David Prinosil won the singles title.

== Finals ==
=== Singles ===
(Germany) David Prinosil defeated (Czech Republic) Petr Korda 6–1, 6–2

- It was Prinosil's 1st title of the year and the 5th of his career.

=== Doubles ===
(Australia) Sandon Stolle / (Czech Republic) Cyril Suk defeated (Slovakia) Ján Krošlák / (Slovakia) Karol Kučera 7–6, 6–3

- It was Stolle's 1st title of the year and the 6th of his career. It was Suk's 2nd title of the year and the 19th of his career.
