= 1996 IPB Czech Indoor – Singles =

Singles
- 1996 IPB Czech Indoor

Final
- Champion: (Germany) David Prinosil
- Runner-up: (Czech Republic) Petr Korda
- Score: 6–1, 6–2

Details
- Draw: 32
- Seeds: 8

Events
Singles	Doubles
- IPB Czech Indoor

Wayne Ferreira was the defending champion but lost in the quarterfinals to Tim Henman.

David Prinosil won in the final 6–1, 6–2 against Petr Korda.

== Seeds ==
A champion seed is indicated in bold text while text in italics indicates the round in which that seed was eliminated.

1. (Croatia) Goran Ivanišević (second round)
2. (South Africa) Wayne Ferreira (quarterfinals)
3. (Germany) Boris Becker (second round, withdrew)
4. (Netherlands) Richard Krajicek (first round)
5. (United States) Todd Martin (quarterfinals)
6. (Germany) Michael Stich (quarterfinals)
7. (United Kingdom) Tim Henman (semifinals)
8. (Czech Republic) Bohdan Ulihrach (second round)

== Draw ==
Key

- Q = Qualifier
- WC = Wild card
- LL = Lucky loser
- Alt = Alternate
- ITF = ITF entry
- PR = Protected ranking
- SR = Special ranking
- SE = Special exempt
- JE = Junior exempt
- JR = Junior Accelerator Programme entrant
- CO = College Accelerator Programme entrant
- NG = Next Gen Accelerator Program entrant
- w/o = Walkover
- r = Retired
- d = Defaulted

First round
1	(Croatia) **G Ivanišević**	**7^{7}**	**6**
(Romania) A Voinea	6^{2}	4
(Ecuador) N Lapentti	3	2
(Czech Republic) **P Korda**	**6**	**6**
(Russia) A Volkov	2	3
(Czech Republic) **J Novák**	**6**	**6**
(Czech Republic) D Vacek	2	**6**	5
8	(Czech Republic) **B Ulihrach**	**6**	3	**7**
WC/3	(Germany) **B Becker**	**6**	**6**
(Denmark) F Fetterlein	3	4
(Netherlands) D van Scheppingen	3	4
(Czech Republic) **M Damm**	**6**	**6**
(Germany) **A Rădulescu**	**7^{7}**	**7**
Q	(Czech Republic) P Luxa	6^{5}	5
(Australia) S Stolle	6^{6}	2
6	(Germany) **M Stich**	**7^{8}**	**6**
5	(United States) **T Martin**	**6**	**6**
(Slovakia) J Krošlák	3	4
(Italy) **C Caratti**	**6**	**6**
WC	(Netherlands) P Wessels	2	4
Q	(Germany) **P Baur**	**7^{11}**	**7**
(Slovakia) K Kučera	6^{9}	5
(Germany) **D Prinosil**	**6**	**6**
4	(Netherlands) R Krajicek	4	3
7	(United Kingdom) **T Henman**	**7^{7}**	**6**
(Sweden) N Kulti	6^{3}	4
(United Kingdom) **G Rusedski**	**6**	**7^{7}**
Q	(Switzerland) G Bastl	4	6^{5}
Q	(Netherlands) **J Winnink**	**6**	4	**7**
WC	(Czech Republic) M Tabara	4	**6**	5
(Italy) R Furlan	5	**6**	3
2	(South Africa) **W Ferreira**	**7**	4	**6**

Second round
1	(Croatia) G Ivanišević	6^{5}	2
(Czech Republic) **P Korda**	**7^{7}**	**6**
(Czech Republic) **J Novák**	**6**	**6**
8	(Czech Republic) B Ulihrach	4	2
WC/3	(Germany) B Becker
(Czech Republic) **M Damm**	w/o
(Germany) A Rădulescu	6^{7}	3
6	(Germany) **M Stich**	**7^{9}**	**6**
5	(United States) **T Martin**	**6**	**6**
(Italy) C Caratti	4	1
Q	(Germany) P Baur	0	3
(Germany) **D Prinosil**	**6**	**6**
7	(United Kingdom) **T Henman**	**7^{7}**	**7**
(United Kingdom) G Rusedski	6^{2}	5
Q	(Netherlands) J Winnink	6^{3}	**7**	5
2	(South Africa) **W Ferreira**	**7^{7}**	5	**7**

Quarterfinals
(Czech Republic) **P Korda**	**6**	**6**
(Czech Republic) J Novák	1	0
(Czech Republic) **M Damm**	5	**6**	**6**
6	(Germany) M Stich	**7**	4	4
5	(United States) T Martin	6^{7}	6^{2}
(Germany) **D Prinosil**	**7^{9}**	**7^{7}**
7	(United Kingdom) **T Henman**	**6**	**6**
2	(South Africa) W Ferreira	4	3

Semifinals
(Czech Republic) **P Korda**	4	**6**	**7**
(Czech Republic) M Damm	**6**	3	5
(Germany) **D Prinosil**	**6**	**6**
7	(United Kingdom) T Henman	4	3

Final
(Czech Republic) Petr Korda	1	2
(Germany) **David Prinosil**	**6**	**6**
