= 1996 IPB Czech Indoor – Doubles =

Doubles
- 1996 IPB Czech Indoor
- 1995 Champions: (Sweden) Jonas Björkman (Argentina) Javier Frana

Final
- Champions: (Australia) Sandon Stolle (Czech Republic) Cyril Suk
- Runners-up: (Slovakia) Karol Kučera (Slovakia) Ján Krošlák
- Score: 7–6, 6–3

Details
- Draw: 16
- Seeds: 4

Events
Singles	Doubles
- IPB Czech Indoor

Jonas Björkman and Javier Frana was the defending champions but did not compete that year.

Sandon Stolle and Cyril Suk won in the final 7–6, 6–3 against Karol Kučera and Ján Krošlák.

== Seeds ==
Champion seeds are indicated in bold text while text in italics indicates the round in which those seeds were eliminated.

1. (Belgium) Libor Pimek / (South Africa) Byron Talbot (first round)
2. (Australia) **Sandon Stolle** / (Czech Republic) **Cyril Suk (champions)**
3. (Netherlands) Menno Oosting / (Czech Republic) Pavel Vízner (first round)
4. (Czech Republic) Jiří Novák / (Czech Republic) David Rikl (first round)

== Draw ==
Key

- Q = Qualifier
- WC = Wild card
- LL = Lucky loser
- Alt = Alternate
- ITF = ITF entry
- PR = Protected ranking
- SR = Special ranking
- SE = Special exempt
- JE = Junior exempt
- JR = Junior Accelerator Programme entrant
- CO = College Accelerator Programme entrant
- NG = Next Gen Accelerator Program entrant
- w/o = Walkover
- r = Retired
- d = Defaulted

First round
1	(Belgium) L Pimek (South Africa) B Talbot	**7**	4	6
(Sweden) **D Ekerot** (Sweden) **P Nyborg**	6	**6**	**7**
(United States) **S Cannon** (United States) **T. J. Middleton**	**7**	**6**
(South Africa) J-L de Jager (South Africa) C van Rensburg	6	4
4	(Czech Republic) J Novák (Czech Republic) D Rikl	4	**6**	4
WC	(Czech Republic) **P Luxa** (Czech Republic) **B Ulihrach**	**6**	4	**6**
WC	(Slovakia) **J Krošlák** (Slovakia) **K Kučera**	**6**	**6**
(Czech Republic) V Flégl (Czech Republic) D Vacek	1	2
(Croatia) S Hiršzon (Croatia) G Ivanišević	**7**	4	6
(United Kingdom) **T Henman** (United Kingdom) **A Richardson**	6	**6**	**7**
(South Africa) **L Bale** (South Africa) **W Ferreira**	**6**	**6**
3	(Netherlands) M Oosting (Czech Republic) P Vízner	3	4
WC	(Germany) A Rădulescu (Germany) M Stich	6	**6**	3
Q	(Switzerland) **G Bastl** (Russia) **A Volkov**	**7**	4	**6**
(Italy) D Nargiso (Netherlands) J Winnink	3	6
2	(Australia) **S Stolle** (Czech Republic) **C Suk**	**6**	**7**

Quarterfinals
(Sweden) **D Ekerot** (Sweden) **P Nyborg**	6	**6**	**6**
(United States) S Cannon (United States) T. J. Middleton	**7**	4	4
WC	(Czech Republic) P Luxa (Czech Republic) B Ulihrach	3	2
WC	(Slovakia) **J Krošlák** (Slovakia) **K Kučera**	**6**	**6**
(United Kingdom) **T Henman** (United Kingdom) **A Richardson**	**6**	**6**
(South Africa) L Bale (South Africa) W Ferreira	1	2
Q	(Switzerland) G Bastl (Russia) A Volkov	**6**	3	3
2	(Australia) **S Stolle** (Czech Republic) **C Suk**	4	**6**	**6**

Semifinals
(Sweden) D Ekerot (Sweden) P Nyborg	4	3
WC	(Slovakia) **J Krošlák** (Slovakia) **K Kučera**	**6**	**6**
(United Kingdom) T Henman (United Kingdom) A Richardson	3	**7**	5
2	(Australia) **S Stolle** (Czech Republic) **C Suk**	**6**	5	**7**

Final
WC	(Slovakia) Ján Krošlák (Slovakia) Karol Kučera	6	3
2	(Australia) **Sandon Stolle** (Czech Republic) **Cyril Suk**	**7**	**6**
