= 1998 IPB Czech Indoor – Singles =

Singles
- 1998 IPB Czech Indoor

Final
- Champion: (United States) Andre Agassi
- Runner-up: (Slovakia) Ján Krošlák
- Score: 6–2, 3–6, 6–3

Details
- Draw: 32
- Seeds: 8

Events
| Singles | Doubles |
- IPB Czech Indoor

The 1998 IPB Czech Indoor was a men's tennis tournament played on indoor carpet in Ostrava, Czech Republic that was part of the International Series of the 1998 ATP Tour. It was the fifth edition of the tournament and was held from 19 October – 25 October.

== Seeds ==
Champion seeds are indicated in bold text while text in italics indicates the round in which those seeds were eliminated.

1. (Czech Republic) Petr Korda (first round)
2. (United States) **Andre Agassi (champion)**
3. (Slovakia) Karol Kučera (second round)
4. (Russia) Yevgeny Kafelnikov (second round)
5. (Croatia) Goran Ivanišević (first round)
6. (Australia) Mark Philippoussis (first round)
7. (Sweden) Thomas Enqvist (semifinals)
8. (Sweden) Thomas Johansson (quarterfinals)

== Draw ==
Key

- Q = Qualifier
- WC = Wild card
- LL = Lucky loser
- Alt = Alternate
- ITF = ITF entry
- PR = Protected ranking
- SR = Special ranking
- SE = Special exempt
- JE = Junior exempt
- JR = Junior Accelerator Programme entrant
- CO = College Accelerator Programme entrant
- NG = Next Gen Accelerator Program entrant
- w/o = Walkover
- r = Retired
- d = Defaulted

=== Finals ===
Semifinals
7 | (Sweden) Thomas Enqvist | 3^{r}
**(Slovakia) Ján Krošlák** | 4
(Zimbabwe) Wayne Black | 6^{2} | 3
2 | **(United States) Andre Agassi** | **7** | **6**

Final
(Slovakia) Ján Krošlák | 2 | **6** | 3
2 | **(United States) Andre Agassi** | **6** | 3 | **6**

=== Top half ===
First round
**(Russia) M Safin** | **6** | **6**
1 | (Czech Republic) P Korda | 4 | 2
**(Sweden) N Kulti** | 3 | **6** | **6**
(United States) J-M Gambill | **6** | 3 | 2
**(Czech Republic) B Ulihrach** | **6** | **6**
(Germany) L Rehmann | 4 | 3
7 | **(Sweden) T Enqvist** | 3 | **6** | **6**
(Netherlands) P Haarhuis | **6** | 4 | 2
3 | **(Slovakia) K Kučera** | 4 | **7** | **6**
(Czech Republic) D Vacek | **6** | 6^{3} | 3
**(Ukraine) A Medvedev** | **6** | **6**
(Netherlands) S Schalken | 0 | 4
**(France) G Raoux** | 4 | **6** | **7**
(Sweden) M Tillström | **6** | 3 | 6^{3}
**(Slovakia) J Krošlák** | 4 | **6** | **7**
5 | (Croatia) G Ivanišević | **6** | 2 | 6^{4}

Second round
(Russia) M Safin | 6^{4} | 6^{1}
**(Sweden) N Kulti** | **7** | **7**
(Czech Republic) B Ulihrach | **7** | 2 | 4
7 | **(Sweden) T Enqvist** | 6^{4} | **6** | **6**
3 | (Slovakia) K Kučera | 4 | **7** | 4
**(Ukraine) A Medvedev** | **6** | 6^{4} | **6**
(France) G Raoux | 5 | 2
**(Slovakia) J Krošlák** | **7** | **6**

Quarterfinals
(Sweden) N Kulti | 3 | 4
7 | **(Sweden) T Enqvist** | **6** | **6**
(Ukraine) A Medvedev | 3 | 0
**(Slovakia) J Krošlák** | **6** | **6**

Semifinals
7 | (Sweden) T Enqvist | 3^{r}
**(Slovakia) J Krošlák** | 4

=== Bottom half ===
First round
**(Germany) D Prinosil** | **6** | 6^{8} | **6**
6 | (Australia) M Philippoussis | 3 | **7** | 3
**(Zimbabwe) W Black** | **6** | **6**
(Czech Republic) R Štěpánek | 3 | 3
**(Czech Republic) M Damm** | 5 | **6** | **6**
(Zimbabwe) B Black | **7** | 2 | 4
4 | **(Russia) Y Kafelnikov** | **7** | **6**
(Australia) R Fromberg | 6^{4} | 3
8 | **(Sweden) T Johansson** | **6** | **6**
(Australia) A Ilie | 4 | 4
**(Czech Republic) J Novák** | **7** | 0 | **7**
(Germany) N Kiefer | 6^{5} | **6** | 6^{2}
**(Sweden) M Norman** | **7** | **7**
(Netherlands) J van Lottum | 6^{5} | 6^{7}
2 | **(United States) A Agassi** | **6** | **6**
(Denmark) K Carlsen | 4 | 4

Second round
(Germany) D Prinosil | **6** | 2 | 4
**(Zimbabwe) W Black** | 3 | **6** | **6**
**(Czech Republic) M Damm** | 3 | **6** | **6**
4 | (Russia) Y Kafelnikov | **6** | 3 | 2
8 | **(Sweden) T Johansson** | **6** | **7**
(Czech Republic) J Novák | 4 | 5
(Sweden) M Norman | 2 | 5
2 | **(United States) A Agassi** | **6** | **7**

Quarterfinals
**(Zimbabwe) W Black** | **7** | 6^{8} | **6**
(Czech Republic) M Damm | 6^{3} | **7** | 3
8 | (Sweden) T Johansson | **7** | 4 | 4
2 | **(United States) A Agassi** | 6^{6} | **6** | **6**

Semifinals
(Zimbabwe) W Black | 6^{2} | 3
2 | **(United States) A Agassi** | **7** | **6**
