= 2003 Ordina Open – Men's singles =

Men's singles
- 2003 Ordina Open

Final
- Champion: (Netherlands) Sjeng Schalken
- Runner-up: (France) Arnaud Clément
- Score: 6–3, 6–4

Details
- Draw: 32 (4 Q / 3 WC )
- Seeds: 8

Events
Singles	men	women
Doubles	men	women
- Ordina Open

Sjeng Schalken was the defending champion and won in the final 6–3, 6–4 against Arnaud Clément.

== Seeds ==
A champion seed is indicated in bold text while text in italics indicates the round in which that seed was eliminated.

1. (Czech Republic) Jiří Novák (quarterfinals)
2. (Thailand) Paradorn Srichaphan (second round)
3. (Netherlands) **Sjeng Schalken (champion)**
4. (Netherlands) Martin Verkerk (first round)
5. (France) Sébastien Grosjean (second round)
6. (Spain) Tommy Robredo (quarterfinals)
7. (France) Arnaud Clément (final)
8. (Argentina) José Acasuso (first round)

== Draw ==
Key

- Q = Qualifier
- WC = Wild card
- LL = Lucky loser
- Alt = Alternate
- ITF = ITF entry
- PR = Protected ranking
- SR = Special ranking
- SE = Special exempt
- JE = Junior exempt
- JR = Junior Accelerator Programme entrant
- CO = College Accelerator Programme entrant
- NG = Next Gen Accelerator Program entrant
- w/o = Walkover
- r = Retired
- d = Defaulted

First round
WC/1	(Czech Republic) **J Novák**	**6**	**6**
(Austria) J Melzer	1	3
(France) **O Mutis**	**6**	**7^{7}**
(Netherlands) R Krajicek	4	6^{4}
(Czech Republic) **J Vacek**	**7^{7}**	**6**
(France) A Dupuis	6^{2}	3
Q	(Germany) P Petzschner	2	**7**	3
5	(France) **S Grosjean**	**6**	5	**6**
4	(Netherlands) M Verkerk	**6**	4	6^{11}
(Germany) **L Burgsmüller**	3	**6**	**7^{13}**
(Spain) **F Vicente**	0	**7^{12}**	**6**
(Italy) D Sanguinetti	**6**	6^{10}	2
WC	(Netherlands) **D v Scheppingen**	3	**6**	**6**
(Spain) F López	**6**	4	3
WC	(Netherlands) F Hemmes Jr.	2	3
7	(France) **A Clément**	**6**	**6**
6	(Spain) **T Robredo**	5	**7^{7}**	**6**
LL	(Germany) F Moser	**7**	6^{1}	2
(Denmark) **K Carlsen**	**6**	**6**
Q	(Switzerland) Y Allegro	4	3
(Croatia) M Ančić	2	3
(Belgium) **C Rochus**	**6**	**6**
(Spain) A Portas	2	2
3	(Netherlands) **S Schalken**	**6**	**6**
8	(Argentina) J Acasuso	3	2
(Netherlands) **J van Lottum**	**6**	**6**
Q	(Czech Republic) **F Čermák**	**6**
(Germany) N Kiefer	3	r
(Slovakia) K Beck	3	5
(Netherlands) **R Sluiter**	**6**	**7**
Q	(Netherlands) P Logtens	4	**6**	4
2	(Thailand) **P Srichaphan**	**6**	4	**6**

Second round
WC/1	(Czech Republic) **J Novák**	**6**	**6**
(France) O Mutis	2	4
(Czech Republic) **J Vacek**	**6**	3	**6**
5	(France) S Grosjean	4	**6**	2
(Germany) L Burgsmüller	**6**	4	4
(Spain) **F Vicente**	4	**6**	**6**
WC	(Netherlands) D van Scheppingen	6^{4}	**7^{7}**	3
7	(France) **A Clément**	**7^{7}**	6^{5}	**6**
6	(Spain) **T Robredo**	**6**	2	**6**
(Denmark) K Carlsen	4	**6**	3
(Belgium) C Rochus	0	0
3	(Netherlands) **S Schalken**	**6**	**6**
(Netherlands) **J van Lottum**	**6**	**6**
Q	(Czech Republic) F Čermák	4	3
(Netherlands) **R Sluiter**	**7**	**6**
2	(Thailand) P Srichaphan	5	4

Quarterfinals
WC/1	(Czech Republic) J Novák	4	4
(Czech Republic) **J Vacek**	**6**	**6**
(Spain) F Vicente	**6**	3	0
7	(France) **A Clément**	4	**6**	**6**
6	(Spain) T Robredo	5	4
3	(Netherlands) **S Schalken**	**7**	**6**
(Netherlands) J van Lottum	4	5
(Netherlands) **R Sluiter**	**6**	**7**

Semifinals
(Czech Republic) J Vacek	3	4
7	(France) **A Clément**	**6**	**6**
3	(Netherlands) **S Schalken**	**6**	**6**
(Netherlands) R Sluiter	3	4

Final
7	(France) Arnaud Clément	3	4
3	(Netherlands) **Sjeng Schalken**	**6**	**6**
