= 2002 Ordina Open =

- Date: 17–23 June
- Edition: 13th (men) / 7th (women)
- Surface: Grass / outdoor
- Location: Rosmalen, 's-Hertogenbosch, Netherlands

Champions

Men's singles
- (Netherlands) Sjeng Schalken

Women's singles
- (Greece) Eleni Daniilidou

Men's doubles
- (Czech Republic) Martin Damm / (Czech Republic) Cyril Suk

Women's doubles
- (Australia) Catherine Barclay / (Germany) Martina Müller
- Ordina Open

The 2002 Ordina Open was a tennis tournament played on grass courts in Rosmalen, 's-Hertogenbosch in the Netherlands that was part of the International Series of the 2002 ATP Tour and of Tier III of the 2002 WTA Tour. The tournament was held from June 17 through June 23, 2002.

== Finals ==
=== Men's singles ===
(Netherlands) Sjeng Schalken defeated (France) Arnaud Clément 3–6, 6–3, 6–2

- It was Schalken's only title of the year and the 13th of his career.

=== Women's singles ===
(Greece) Eleni Daniilidou defeated (Russia) Elena Dementieva 3–6, 6–2, 6–3

- It was Daniilidou's only title of the year and the 1st of her career.

=== Men's doubles ===
(Czech Republic) Martin Damm / (Czech Republic) Cyril Suk defeated (Netherlands) Paul Haarhuis / (United States) Brian MacPhie 7–6^{(8–6)}, 6–7^{(6–8)}, 6–4

- It was Damm's 3rd title of the year and the 23rd of his career. It was Suk's 3rd title of the year and the 25th of his career.

=== Women's doubles ===
(Australia) Catherine Barclay / (Germany) Martina Müller defeated (Germany) Bianka Lamade / (Bulgaria) Magdalena Maleeva 6–4, 7–5

- It was Barclay's 2nd title of the year and the 2nd of her career. It was Müller's 2nd title of the year and the 2nd of her career.
