= 1998 IPB Czech Indoor =

- Date: 19–25 October
- Edition: 5th
- Category: World Series
- Draw: 32S / 16D
- Prize money: $975,000
- Surface: Carpet / indoor
- Location: Ostrava, Czech Republic

Champions

Singles
- (United States) Andre Agassi

Doubles
- (Germany) Nicolas Kiefer / (Germany) David Prinosil
- IPB Czech Indoor

The 1998 IPB Czech Indoor was a men's tennis tournament played on indoor carpet courts in Ostrava, Czech Republic that was part of the World Series of the 1998 ATP Tour. It was the fifth edition of the tournament and was held from 19 October to 25 October 1998. Second-seeded Andre Agassi won the singles title.

== Finals ==
=== Singles ===
(United States) Andre Agassi defeated (Slovakia) Ján Krošlák, 6–2, 3–6, 6–3

- It was Agassi's 5th singles title of the year and the 39th of his career.

=== Doubles ===
(Germany) Nicolas Kiefer / (Germany) David Prinosil defeated (South Africa) David Adams / (Czech Republic) Pavel Vízner, 6–4, 6–3.
