= 1995 IPB Czech Indoor – Doubles =

Doubles
- 1995 IPB Czech Indoor

Final
- Champions: (Sweden) Jonas Björkman (Argentina) Javier Frana
- Runners-up: (France) Guy Forget (Australia) Patrick Rafter
- Score: 6–7, 6–4, 7–6

Details
- Draw: 16
- Seeds: 4

Events
Singles	Doubles
- Ostrava Open

Martin Damm and Karel Nováček were the defending champions, but lost in the first round to Olivier Delaître and Greg Rusedski.

Jonas Björkman and Javier Frana won the title by defeating Guy Forget and Patrick Rafter 6–7, 6–4, 7–6 in the final.

== Seeds ==
1. (Czech Republic) Cyril Suk / (Czech Republic) Daniel Vacek (semifinals)
2. (United States) Rick Leach / (United States) Scott Melville (quarterfinals)
3. (France) Guy Forget / (Australia) Patrick Rafter (final)
4. (Czech Republic) Martin Damm / (Czech Republic) Karel Nováček (first round)

== Draw ==
Key

- Q = Qualifier
- WC = Wild card
- LL = Lucky loser
- Alt = Alternate
- ITF = ITF entry
- PR = Protected ranking
- SR = Special ranking
- SE = Special exempt
- JE = Junior exempt
- JR = Junior Accelerator Programme entrant
- CO = College Accelerator Programme entrant
- NG = Next Gen Accelerator Program entrant
- w/o = Walkover
- r = Retired
- d = Defaulted

=== Draw ===
First round
1	(Czech Republic) C Suk (Czech Republic) D Vacek	7	6
WC	(Czech Republic) J Novák (Czech Republic) T Anzari	5	4
(United States) M Lucena (Netherlands) T Nijssen	4	5
WC	(Czech Republic) V Flégl (United States) MV Washington	6	7
3	(France) G Forget (Australia) P Rafter	6	6
Q	(Germany) J Knippschild (Germany) N Kiefer	4	4
(Czech Republic) P Korda (Germany) D Prinosil	6	6
(United States) D Randall (United States) G Van Emburgh	4	3
WC	(Czech Republic) P Luxa (Czech Republic) D Miketa	3	3
(Belgium) L Pimek (South Africa) B Talbot	6	6
(France) O Delaître (United Kingdom) G Rudesdki	6	6
4	(Czech Republic) M Damm (Czech Republic) K Nováček	3	4
(South Africa) E Ferreira (South Africa) W Ferreira	7	3	4
(Sweden) J Björkman (Argentina) J Frana	6	6	6
(United Kingdom) N Broad (South Africa) G Muller	3	3
2	(United States) R Leach (United States) S Melville	6	6

Quarterfinals
1	(Czech Republic) C Suk (Czech Republic) D Vacek	6	6
WC	(Czech Republic) V Flégl (United States) MV Washington	3	2
3	(France) G Forget (Australia) P Rafter	w	/	o
(Czech Republic) P Korda (Germany) D Prinosil
(Belgium) L Pimek (South Africa) B Talbot	4	6
(France) O Delaître (United Kingdom) G Rudesdki	6	7
(Sweden) J Björkman (Argentina) J Frana	6	7
2	(United States) R Leach (United States) S Melville	3	6

Semifinals
1	(Czech Republic) C Suk (Czech Republic) D Vacek	6	7	6
3	(France) G Forget (Australia) P Rafter	7	6	7
(France) O Delaître (United Kingdom) G Rudesdki	6	3
(Sweden) J Björkman (Argentina) J Frana	7	6

Final
3	(France) G Forget (Australia) P Rafter	7	4	6
(Sweden) J Björkman (Argentina) J Frana	6	6	7
