= 2006 Sky Radio Tennis Masters =

The 2006 Sky Radio Tennis Masters were held from 10 to 17 December 2006 in the Topsportcentrum Rotterdam in Rotterdam, Netherlands.

Robin Haase won his first Masters title by beating defending champion Raemon Sluiter in the final. Michaëlla Krajicek won her third consecutive Masters title after beating Elise Tamaëla in a replay of the 2005 final. Krajicek, 17 years old during the tournament had not lost a single match against another Dutch player since she was 11.

Prior to the tournament Thiemo de Bakker and Antal van der Duim were suspended by the Dutch Tennis Association because of bad behaviour after playing some tournaments in Israel in November. Both players were suspended for a month, while Van der Duim also was excluded from the association's youth project.

== Men's results ==
=== Seeds ===
1. Raemon Sluiter
2. Robin Haase
3. Igor Sijsling
4. Jesse Huta Galung
5. ~~Thiemo de Bakker~~
6. Paul Logtens
7. Nick van der Meer
8. Eric Reuijl

=== Finals ===
Quarterfinals
1	Raemon Sluiter	6	6
–	Michel Meijer	4	2
–	Jasper Smit	7	7
–	Michel Koning	6	5
4	Jesse Huta Galung	3	7	6
6	Paul Logtens	6	6	4
–	Matwé Middelkoop	2	4
2	Robin Haase	6	6

Semifinals
1	Raemon Sluiter	6	6
–	Jasper Smit	4	2
4	Jesse Huta Galung	2	4
2	Robin Haase	6	6

Finals
1	Raemon Sluiter	6	3	4
2	Robin Haase	3	6	6

== Women's results ==
=== Seeds ===
1. Michaëlla Krajicek
2. Elise Tamaëla
3. Linda Sentis
4. Olga Kalyuzhnaya
5. Seda Noorlander
6. Daniëlle Harmsen
7. Nicole Thijssen
8. Marrit Boonstra

=== Finals ===
Quarterfinals
1	Michaëlla Krajicek	6	6
8	Marrit Boonstra	3	0
5	Seda Noorlander	7	6
3	Linda Sentis	6	3
4	Olga Kalyuzhnaya	3	1
7	Nicole Thijssen	6	6
6	Daniëlle Harmsen	6	2
2	Elise Tamaëla	6	6

Semifinals
1	Michaëlla Krajicek	6	7
5	Seda Noorlander	4	5
7	Nicole Thijssen	1	3
2	Elise Tamaëla	6	6

Finals
1	Michaëlla Krajicek	6	6
2	Elise Tamaëla	4	4
