= Topsportcentrum Rotterdam =

Indoor sport venue in Rotterdam, Netherlands

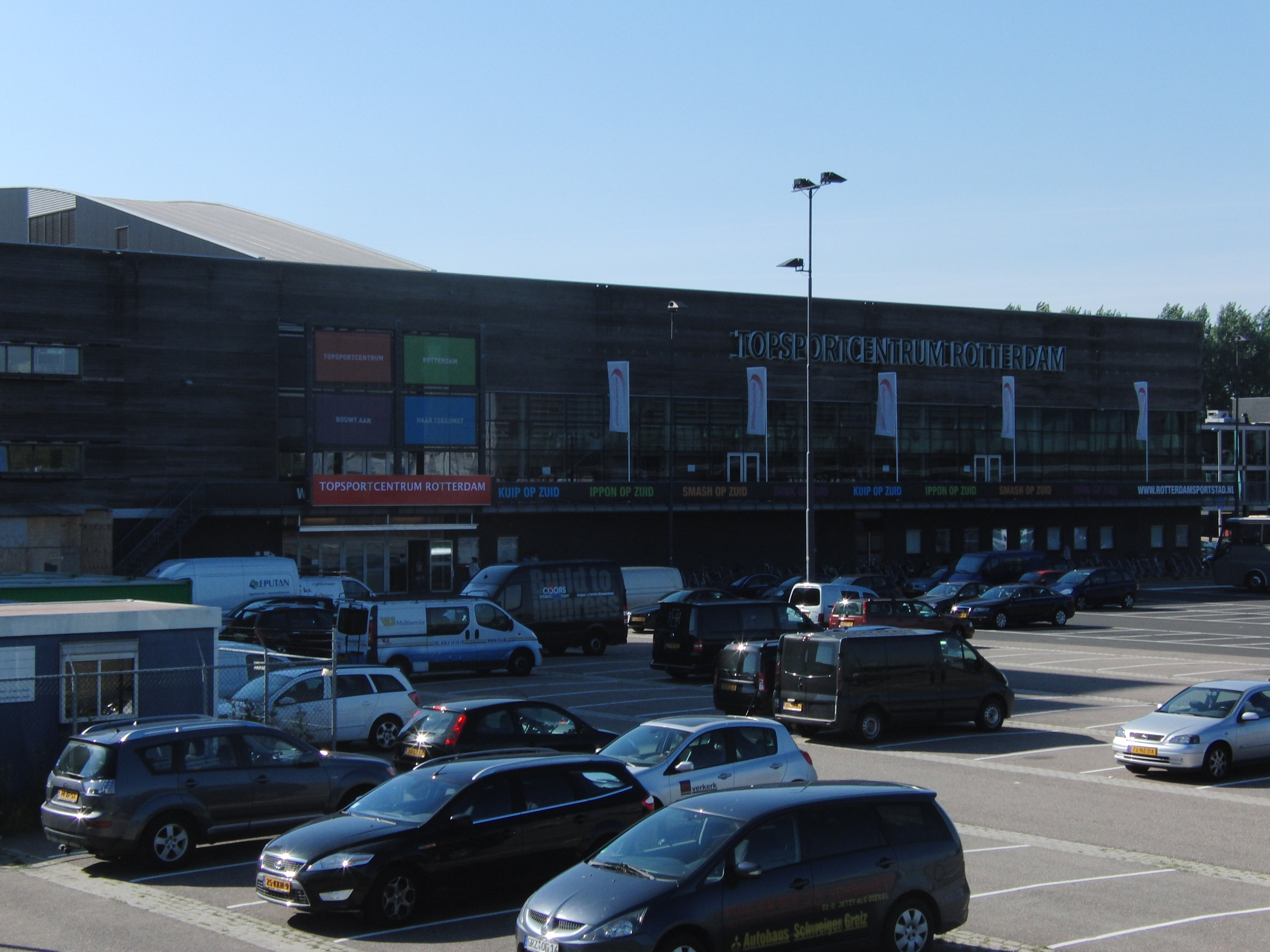
- Interactive map of Topsportcentrum Rotterdam
- Location: Rotterdam, Netherlands
- Coordinates: 51.8940°N 4.5265°E
- Owner: Rotterdam
- Capacity: 2,500

Construction
- Opened: 2000
- Cost: €11 million

Tenant
- Feyenoord Basketbal (basketball)

Topsportcentrum Rotterdam is an indoor arena located in Rotterdam next to the Feijenoord Stadion. The arena opened in 2000 and has a capacity of 2,500 seats. It holds many sports events in various sports and levels, such as international World and European Championships and Dutch National Championships.

The complex exists as two sporting halls. The first is located on the first floor and is 48x28 metres, while the pitch is 40x20 metres. On the second floor another sports hall of 44x24 metres is located. The pitch in this hall is 40x20 metres also, but the underground is rebound ace hardcourt.

As well as the sporting facilities, various hotel, restaurant and cafe facilities are available.

== Teams ==
Currently there are three national sports teams that play their games inside the Topsportcentrum: the volleyball team Ortec Rotterdam Nesselande and the basketball teams Feyenoord Basketball.

== Events ==
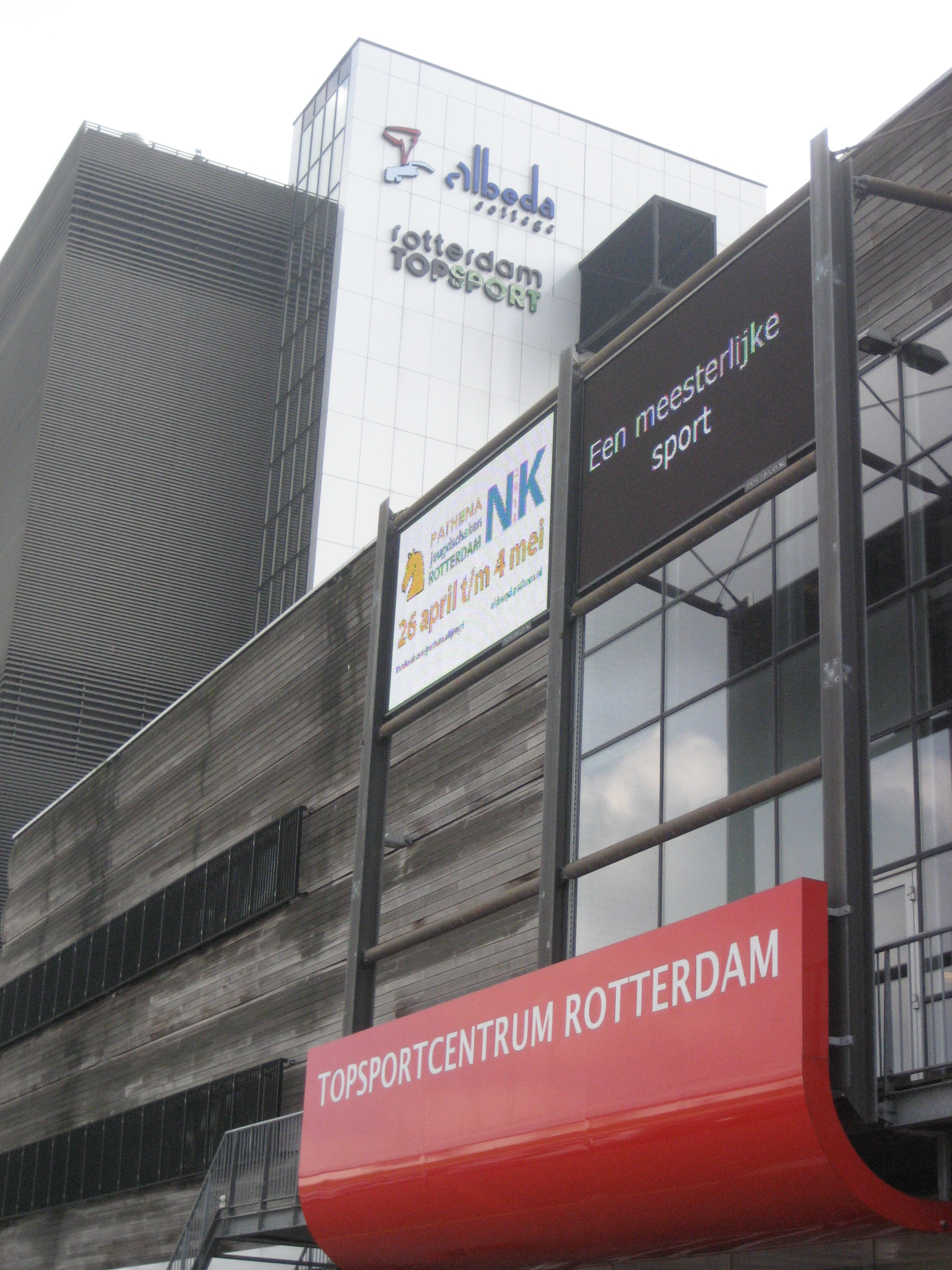
The entrance of the Topsportcentrum in 2014

This is a list of events held in the Topsportcentrum Rotterdam.

- Basketball
  - All Star Basketball Gala (2006)
  - Women's All Star Basketball Gala (2010,2011)
  - Dutch Cup Finals (2006)
  - FEB Basketball Gala (2005)
  - Harlem Globetrotters Exhibition (2004)
  - Men's International Basketball test matches (2002, 2003)
  - Wheelchair basketball European Cup (2000, 2001)
  - Women's European Basketball Championship Qualifiers (2005, 2006)
  - Women's International Basketball test matches (2005)
- Fighting
  - Bep van Klaveren Memorial (2002, 2003, 2004, 2005, 2006)
  - Big Boss Boxing Gala (2004, 2005)
  - Dutch Boxing Championships (2000)
  - Fighting Gala (2001)
  - It's Showtime Trophy (2006)
  - Kickboxing Gala (2000, 2001, 2002, 2003, 2006)
  - Kickboxing Muay Thai Gala (2001)
  - Mix Fight Gala (2004)
  - Regilio Tuur homecoming (2001)
  - Sumo Challenge (2000)
- Futsal
  - European Futsal Championships (2001)
  - Footlockers Futsal Tournament (2000)
  - International test matches The Netherlands (2005)
- Handball
  - Mini CSIT Handball Tournament (2005)
  - Women's Holland Handball Tournament (former Lucardi Cup) (2000, 2001, 2002, 2003, 2004, 2005, 2006)
  - Women's European Handball Championship Qualifiers (2006)
  - Women's World Handball Championship Qualifiers (2001)
- Indoor Hockey
  - European Indoor Hockey Championships A-Division (2001)
  - European Indoor Hockey Championships B-Division (2002)
- Judo
  - Dutch Open Grand Prix Rotterdam (2000, 2001)
  - A-Tournament Dutch Open Rotterdam (2002, 2003, 2004)
  - World Cup Dutch Open Rotterdam (2005, 2006)
  - Dutch Judo Championships (2004, 2005)
  - 2004 European Cadet Judo Championships
  - 2005 European Judo Championships
- Jujutsu
  - 2006 Ju-Jitsu World Championships
- Karate
  - Dutch Open Karate Championships (2001, 2002, 2003, 2004, 2005)
  - Dutch Senior Karate Championships (2005)
  - Golden League (2006)
  - Rotterdam Karate Cup (2004, 2005, 2006)
  - World Gojukai Karate Championships (2005)
- Korfball
  - Dutch B-Youth Korfball Championship (2000)
  - Rotterdam Korfball Challenge (2000, 2001, 2002, 2003, 2004, 2005)
  - World Korfball Championships (2003)
- Table tennis
  - European Table tennis Top 12 (2002)
  - Table tennis Pro Tour (2001)
- Volleyball
  - Dutch Volleyball Cup Finals (2004)
  - Final Four (2006)
  - Men's European Volleyball Championship Qualifiers (2002, 2006)
  - Men's European Volleyball League (2006)
  - Men's youth Volleyball international test matches (2006)
  - Ortec Rotterdam Nesselande European Cup matches (2002, 2004, 2005, 2006)
  - Women's Volleyball international test matches (2006)
  - Men's European Volleyball Championship Qualifiers (2001)
- Other
  - 2006 Sky Radio Tennis Masters
  - Dutch Sportsman of the year announcement (2005)
  - European Aerobics and Fitness Championships (2004)
  - European Wushu Championship (2000)
  - Rotterdam Kendo Tournament (2000)
  - Kingdom of the Netherlands Games (2001)
  - Rotterdam Sportsman of the year announcement (2001, 2003, 2004)
  - Rotterdam Tennismasters (2002, 2003, 2004, 2005)
  - World 3-cushion Billiards Championships (2004)
  - Zomercarnaval Queen Election (2003)
  - Zuid-Holland Gymnastics Championships (2001, 2004, 2006)
  - Chess (Dutch Youth Chess Championships 2014)

== See also ==
- Topsportcentrum
