= 2003 Ordina Open – Women's doubles =

Women's doubles
- 2003 Ordina Open

Final
- Champions: (Russia) Elena Dementieva (Russia) Lina Krasnoroutskaya
- Runners-up: (Russia) Nadia Petrova (France) Mary Pierce
- Score: 2–6, 6–3, 6–4

Details
- Draw: 16
- Seeds: 4

Events
Singles	men	women
Doubles	men	women
← 2002 ·	Rosmalen Grass Court Championships	· 2004 →

Catherine Barclay and Martina Müller were the defending champions but Müller did not enter this year, as she competed at the qualifying rounds of the Wimbledon Championships during the same week. Barclay teamed up with Nannie de Villiers and lost in the first round to tournament runners-up Nadia Petrova and Mary Pierce.

Elena Dementieva and Lina Krasnoroutskaya won the title by defeating Nadia Petrova and Mary Pierce 2–6, 6–3, 6–4 in the final.

== Seeds ==
1. (Spain) Virginia Ruano Pascual / (Argentina) Paola Suárez (quarterfinals)
2. (Slovenia) Tina Križan / (Slovenia) Katarina Srebotnik (semifinals, retired due to a lumbar strain on Križan)
3. (Russia) Elena Dementieva / (Russia) Lina Krasnoroutskaya (champions)
4. (Belgium) Els Callens / (France) Émilie Loit (first round)

== Draw ==
=== Key ===
- Q = Qualifier
- WC = Wild card
- LL = Lucky loser
- Alt = Alternate
- SE = Special exempt
- PR = Protected ranking
- ITF = ITF entry
- JE = Junior exempt
- w/o = Walkover
- r = Retired
- d = Defaulted
- SR = Special ranking

=== Draw ===
First round
1	(Spain) V Ruano Pascual (Argentina) P Suárez	6	6
(Netherlands) D Haak (Netherlands) K Kilsdonk	2	1
(Australia) C Barclay (South Africa) N de Villiers	3	3
(Russia) N Petrova (France) M Pierce	6	6
4	(Belgium) E Callens (France) É Loit	4	5
(Russia) A Jidkova (Germany) B Rittner	6	7
(Italy) R Grande (Indonesia) A Widjaja	6	6
(United States) A Harkleroad (Paraguay) R de los Ríos	4	4
(Slovenia) M Matevžič (Slovakia) H Nagyová	6	6
(Australia) L McShea (Kazakhstan) I Selyutina	2	2
(Australia) N Pratt (Uzbekistan) I Tulyaganova	4	6	6^{1}
3	(Russia) E Dementieva (Russia) L Krasnoroutskaya	6	2	7^{7}
(Australia) A Rodionova (Germany) M Weingärtner	1	4
(Australia) T Musgrave (United States) A Spears	6	6
(France) M Bartoli (France) S Cohen-Aloro	5	1
2	(Slovenia) T Križan (Slovenia) K Srebotnik	7	6

Quarterfinals
1	(Spain) V Ruano Pascual (Argentina) P Suárez	4	4
(Russia) N Petrova (France) M Pierce	6	6
(Russia) A Jidkova (Germany) B Rittner	6	7
(Italy) R Grande (Indonesia) A Widjaja	4	5
(Slovenia) M Matevžič (Slovakia) H Nagyová	3	6^{2}
3	(Russia) E Dementieva (Russia) L Krasnoroutskaya	6	7^{7}
(Australia) T Musgrave (United States) A Spears	3	6	2
2	(Slovenia) T Križan (Slovenia) K Srebotnik	6	3	6

Semifinals
(Russia) N Petrova (France) M Pierce	6	6
(Russia) A Jidkova (Germany) B Rittner	3	3
3	(Russia) E Dementieva (Russia) L Krasnoroutskaya	7^{7}
2	(Slovenia) T Križan (Slovenia) K Srebotnik	6^{5}	r

Final
(Russia) N Petrova (France) M Pierce	6	3	4
3	(Russia) E Dementieva (Russia) L Krasnoroutskaya	2	6	6
