= 1994 IPB Czech Indoor – Singles =

Singles
- 1994 IPB Czech Indoor

Final
- Champion: (United States) MaliVai Washington
- Runner-up: (France) Arnaud Boetsch
- Score: 3–6, 6–4, 6–3

Details
- Draw: 32 (3WC/4Q)
- Seeds: 8

Events
Singles	Doubles
- Ostrava Open

In the first edition of the tournament, MaliVai Washington won the title by defeating Arnaud Boetsch 3–6, 6–4, 6–3 in the final.

== Seeds ==
1. (Spain) Alberto Berasategui (first round)
2. (Czech Republic) Petr Korda (first round)
3. (Spain) Carlos Costa (first round)
4. (France) Cédric Pioline (first round)
5. (United States) MaliVai Washington (champion)
6. (France) Arnaud Boetsch (final)
7. (Czech Republic) Sláva Doseděl (first round)
8. (Czech Republic) Karel Nováček (first round)

== Draw ==
Key

- Q = Qualifier
- WC = Wild card
- LL = Lucky loser
- Alt = Alternate
- ITF = ITF entry
- PR = Protected ranking
- SR = Special ranking
- SE = Special exempt
- JE = Junior exempt
- JR = Junior Accelerator Programme entrant
- CO = College Accelerator Programme entrant
- NG = Next Gen Accelerator Program entrant
- w/o = Walkover
- r = Retired
- d = Defaulted

=== Finals ===
Semifinals
(Czech Republic) Martin Damm	3	6	5
5	(United States) MaliVai Washington	6	2	7
6	(France) Arnaud Boetsch	6^{6}	6	6
(Italy) Diego Nargiso	7^{8}	4	2

Final
5	(United States) MaliVai Washington	4	6	6
6	(France) Arnaud Boetsch	6	3	3

=== Top half ===
First round
1	(Spain) A Berasategui	6^{3}	4
(Russia) A Volkov	7^{7}	6
WC	(Germany) N Kiefer	1	3
(United Kingdom) J Bates	6	6
(France) R Gilbert	6	6
(France) G Raoux	3	4
(Czech Republic) M Damm	7^{8}	6
7	(Czech Republic) S Doseděl	6^{6}	4
4	(France) C Pioline	7^{7}	5	4
Q	(Belgium) J Van Herck	6^{1}	7	6
(Germany) M Zoecke	2	4
(Denmark) K Carlsen	6	6
(Czech Republic) D Rikl	1	1
(Germany) H Dreekmann	6	6
(Austria) H Skoff	4	r
5	(United States) MV Washington	6

Second round
(Russia) A Volkov	5	6^{3}
(United Kingdom) J Bates	7	7^{7}
(France) R Gilbert	4	4
(Czech Republic) M Damm	6	6
Q	(Belgium) J Van Herck	4	3
(Denmark) K Carlsen	6	6
(Germany) H Dreekmann	6^{3}	3
5	(United States) MV Washington	7^{7}	6

Quarterfinals
(United Kingdom) J Bates	2	3
(Czech Republic) M Damm	6	6
(Denmark) K Carlsen	6^{4}	6^{6}
5	(United States) MV Washington	7^{7}	7^{8}

Semifinals
(Czech Republic) M Damm	3	6	5
5	(United States) MV Washington	6	2	7

=== Bottom half ===
First round
6	(France) A Boetsch	6	6
WC	(Czech Republic) Radovan Chrz	1	4
Q	(Germany) A Rădulescu	6	6
WC	(Czech Republic) Otakar Jurecka	2	1
(Germany) J Renzenbrink	6	6
Q	(France) S Simian	3	4
(Sweden) J Svensson	7	6
3	(Spain) C Costa	5	2
8	(Czech Republic) K Nováček	1	4
(Germany) MK Goellner	6	6
(Netherlands) J Siemerink	6	6
Q	(Hungary) J Krocskó	1	2
(France) O Delaître	3	7	1
(Italy) D Nargiso	6	5	6
(France) L Roux	7^{7}	7^{7}
2	(Czech Republic) P Korda	6^{3}	6^{5}

Second round
6	(France) A Boetsch	7^{7}	6
Q	(Germany) A Rădulescu	6^{2}	2
(Germany) J Renzenbrink	3	1
(Sweden) J Svensson	6	6
(Germany) MK Goellner	5	2
(Netherlands) J Siemerink	7	6
(Italy) D Nargiso	6	6
(France) L Roux	3	4

Quarterfinals
6	(France) A Boetsch	2	6	6
(Sweden) J Svensson	6	2	3
(Netherlands) J Siemerink	0	6^{4}
(Italy) D Nargiso	6	7^{7}

Semifinals
6	(France) A Boetsch	6^{6}	6	6
(Italy) D Nargiso	7^{8}	4	2
