= 2002 Ordina Open – Men's singles =

Men's singles
- 2002 Ordina Open
- 2001 Champion: (Australia) Lleyton Hewitt

Final
- Champion: (Netherlands) Sjeng Schalken
- Runner-up: (France) Arnaud Clément
- Score: 3–6, 6–3, 6–2

Details
- Draw: 32 (4 Q / 3 WC )
- Seeds: 8

Events
Singles	men	women
Doubles	men	women
- Ordina Open

Lleyton Hewitt was the defending champion but lost in the quarterfinals to Arnaud Clément.

Sjeng Schalken won in the final 3–6, 6–3, 6–2 against Clément.

== Seeds ==
A champion seed is indicated in bold text while text in italics indicates the round in which that seed was eliminated.

1. (Australia) Lleyton Hewitt (quarterfinals, withdrew because of a stomach virus)
2. (Switzerland) Roger Federer (quarterfinals)
3. (Argentina) Guillermo Cañas (semifinals)
4. (Spain) Tommy Robredo (semifinals)
5. (France) Nicolas Escudé (second round, retired because of a stomach muscle injury)
6. (Netherlands) **Sjeng Schalken (champion)**
7. (France) Arnaud Clément (final)
8. (France) Julien Boutter (first round)

== Draw ==
Key

- Q = Qualifier
- WC = Wild card
- LL = Lucky loser
- Alt = Alternate
- ITF = ITF entry
- PR = Protected ranking
- SR = Special ranking
- SE = Special exempt
- JE = Junior exempt
- JR = Junior Accelerator Programme entrant
- CO = College Accelerator Programme entrant
- NG = Next Gen Accelerator Program entrant
- w/o = Walkover
- r = Retired
- d = Defaulted

First round
1	(Australia) **L Hewitt**	**7^{7}**	**7^{7}**
(United States) M Chang	6^{2}	6^{4}
(Russia) **M Youzhny**	**6**	**6**
(Argentina) A Calleri	3	0
(Netherlands) R Sluiter	6^{4}	2
(United States) **M Russell**	**7^{7}**	**6**
(Germany) O Gross	0	2
7	(France) **A Clément**	**6**	**6**
WC/3	(Argentina) **G Cañas**	**6**	**7**
(Austria) J Knowle	2	5
Q	(Argentina) M García	**6**	2	4
SE	(Denmark) **K Carlsen**	4	**6**	**6**
(France) **C Pioline**	4
(South Africa) N Godwin	5^{r}
(Brazil) F Saretta	6^{5}	6^{1}
5	(France) **N Escudé**	**7^{7}**	**7^{7}**
8	(France) J Boutter	4	4
(France) **A Dupuis**	**6**	**6**
Q	(Switzerland) **Y Allegro**	**6**	**6**
(Spain) Á Calatrava	4	2
Q	(Russia) K I-Smolensky	4	0
(Germany) **M Kohlmann**	**6**	**6**
(United Kingdom) M Lee	6^{3}	**6**	2
4	(Spain) **T Robredo**	**7^{7}**	3	**6**
6	(Netherlands) **S Schalken**	**6**	**6**
(France) J Golmard	4	4
(Belgium) **C Rochus**	1	**6**	**6**
Q	(France) R Cadart	**6**	2	4
(Switzerland) **I Heuberger**	**6**	3	**7^{10}**
WC	(Luxembourg) G Müller	2	**6**	6^{8}
WC	(Netherlands) R Krajicek	2	5
2	(Switzerland) **R Federer**	**6**	**7**

Second round
1	(Australia) **L Hewitt**	**6**	5	**7^{7}**
(Russia) M Youzhny	4	**7**	6^{4}
(United States) M Russell	5	0
7	(France) **A Clément**	**7**	**6**
WC/3	(Argentina) **G Cañas**	**6**	**6**
SE	(Denmark) K Carlsen	4	4
(France) **C Pioline**	4	**3**
5	(France) N Escudé	**6**	1	r
(France) A Dupuis	6^{6}	**7^{7}**	3
Q	(Switzerland) **Y Allegro**	**7^{8}**	6^{1}	**6**
(Germany) M Kohlmann	**7^{8}**	2	1
4	(Spain) **T Robredo**	6^{6}	**6**	**6**
6	(Netherlands) **S Schalken**	4	**7^{7}**	**6**
(Belgium) C Rochus	**6**	6^{1}	3
(Switzerland) I Heuberger	4	r
2	(Switzerland) **R Federer**	**6**

Quarterfinals
1	(Australia) L Hewitt
7	(France) **A Clément**	w/o
WC/3	(Argentina) **G Cañas**	**7^{8}**	**6**
(France) C Pioline	6^{6}	3
Q	(Switzerland) Y Allegro	4	2
4	(Spain) **T Robredo**	**6**	**6**
6	(Netherlands) **S Schalken**	3	**7**	**6**
2	(Switzerland) R Federer	**6**	5	3

Semifinals
7	(France) **A Clément**	**7^{7}**	**6**
WC/3	(Argentina) G Cañas	6^{2}	2
4	(Spain) T Robredo	3	3
6	(Netherlands) **S Schalken**	**6**	**6**

Final
7	(France) Arnaud Clément	**6**	3	2
6	(Netherlands) **Sjeng Schalken**	3	**6**	**6**
