= 2002 Ordina Open – Women's doubles =

Women's doubles
- 2002 Ordina Open

Final
- Champions: (Australia) Catherine Barclay (Germany) Martina Müller
- Runners-up: (Germany) Bianka Lamade (Bulgaria) Magdalena Maleeva
- Score: 6–4, 7–5

Events
Singles	men	women
Doubles	men	women
← 2001 ·	Rosmalen Grass Court Championships	· 2003 →

Ruxandra Dragomir Ilie and Nadia Petrova were the defending champions, but did not compete this year.

Catherine Barclay and Martina Müller won the title, defeating Bianka Lamade and Magdalena Maleeva 6–4, 7–5 in the final.

== Seeds ==
1. (Slovenia) Tina Križan / (Slovenia) Katarina Srebotnik (quarterfinals)
2. (Russia) Elena Bovina / (Russia) Elena Dementieva (first round)
3. (Netherlands) Miriam Oremans / (Germany) Barbara Rittner (first round)
4. (Spain) Marta Marrero / (Belarus) Tatiana Poutchek (quarterfinals)

== Draw ==
=== Key ===
- Q = Qualifier
- WC = Wild card
- LL = Lucky loser
- Alt = Alternate
- SE = Special exempt
- PR = Protected ranking
- ITF = ITF entry
- JE = Junior exempt
- w/o = Walkover
- r = Retired
- d = Defaulted
- SR = Special ranking

=== Draw ===
First round
1	(Slovenia) T Križan (Slovenia) K Srebotnik	6	6
WC	(Netherlands) J Mens (Netherlands) Anouk Sterk	4	2
(Slovenia) T Pisnik (United States) K Schlukebir	3	7^{7}	3
(South Africa) N de Villiers (South Africa) N Grandin	6	6^{5}	6
3	(Netherlands) M Oremans (Germany) B Rittner	3	6^{5}
(Germany) B Lamade (Bulgaria) M Maleeva	6	7^{7}
(Germany) K Freye (Japan) R Hiraki	4	3
(Australia) T Musgrave (Paraguay) R de los Ríos	6	6
(Australia) C Barclay (Germany) M Müller	6	7^{7}
(Spain) C Torrens Valero (United States) M Tu	1	6^{3}
(Germany) A Barna (Germany) M Weingärtner	6	6^{3}	2
4	(Spain) M Marrero (Belarus) T Poutchek	1	7^{7}	6
(Denmark) E Dyrberg (Slovenia) M Matevžič	5	7^{7}	6
(South Africa) K Grant (United States) A Spears	7	6^{1}	1
(Germany) A Glass (Czech Republic) K Hrdličková	6	6
2	(Russia) E Bovina (Russia) E Dementieva	3	3

Quarterfinals
1	(Slovenia) T Križan (Slovenia) K Srebotnik	6^{1}	6	6^{2}
(South Africa) N de Villiers (South Africa) N Grandin	7^{7}	4	7^{7}
(Germany) B Lamade (Bulgaria) M Maleeva	7	7^{7}
(Australia) T Musgrave (Paraguay) R de los Ríos	5	6^{5}
(Australia) C Barclay (Germany) M Müller	6	6
4	(Spain) M Marrero (Belarus) T Poutchek	3	2
(Denmark) E Dyrberg (Slovenia) M Matevžič	5	6^{5}
(Germany) A Glass (Czech Republic) K Hrdličková	7	7^{7}

Semifinals
(South Africa) N de Villiers (South Africa) N Grandin	1	4
(Germany) B Lamade (Bulgaria) M Maleeva	6	6
(Australia) C Barclay (Germany) M Müller	4	6	6
(Germany) A Glass (Czech Republic) K Hrdličková	6	2	1

Final
(Germany) B Lamade (Bulgaria) M Maleeva	4	5
(Australia) C Barclay (Germany) M Müller	6	7
