= 2002 Ordina Open – Women's singles =

Women's singles
- 2002 Ordina Open

Final
- Champion: (Greece) Eleni Daniilidou
- Runner-up: (Russia) Elena Dementieva
- Score: 3–6, 6–2, 6–3

Details
- Seeds: 8

Events
Singles	men	women
Doubles	men	women
← 2001 ·	Rosmalen Grass Court Championships	· 2003 →

Justine Henin was the defending champion, but lost in the semifinals to Eleni Daniilidou.

Unseeded Daniilidou won the title, defeating Elena Dementieva 3–6, 6–2, 6–3 in the final.

== Seeds ==
The first two seeds received a bye into the second round.

1. (Belgium) Kim Clijsters (quarterfinals)
2. (Belgium) Justine Henin (semifinals)
3. (France) Amélie Mauresmo (quarterfinals)
4. (Russia) Elena Dementieva (final)
5. (Bulgaria) Magdalena Maleeva (quarterfinals)
6. (Spain) Cristina Torrens Valero (second round)
7. (Italy) Adriana Serra Zanetti (second round)
8. (Slovakia) Martina Suchá (second round)

== Draw ==
=== Key ===
- Q = Qualifier
- WC = Wild card
- LL = Lucky loser
- Alt = Alternate
- ITF = ITF entry
- PR = Protected ranking
- SR = Special ranking
- SE = Special exempt
- JE = Junior exempt
- JR = Junior Accelerator Programme entrant
- CO = College Accelerator Programme entrant
- NG = Next Gen Accelerator Program entrant
- w/o = Walkover
- r = Retired
- d = Defaulted

=== Finals ===
Semifinal
(Slovenia) Tina Pisnik	2	0
4	(Russia) Elena Dementieva	6	6
(Greece) Eleni Daniilidou	4	7^{11}	6
2	(Belgium) Justine Henin	6	6^{9}	3

Final
4	(Russia) Elena Dementieva	6	2	3
(Greece) Eleni Daniilidou	3	6	6

=== Top half ===
First round
(Germany) A Glass	6^{4}	7	6
(Paraguay) R Neffa-de los Ríos	7^{7}	5	4
(United States) M Tu	0	6	1
(Slovenia) T Pisnik	6	3	6
(Slovenia) M Matevžič	6^{3}	4
7	(Italy) A Serra Zanetti	7^{7}	6
4	(Russia) E Dementieva	7^{7}	6
(Spain) M Marrero	6^{4}	3
WC	(Netherlands) S Bauer	2	2
(Germany) B Lamade	6	6
(Netherlands) M Oremans	6	6
(Denmark) E Dyrberg	1	3
(Germany) M Müller	4	2
5	(Bulgaria) M Maleeva	6	6

Second round
1	(Belgium) K Clijsters	6	6
(Germany) A Glass	3	2
(Slovenia) T Pisnik	6	4	6
7	(Italy) A Serra Zanetti	3	6	4
4	(Russia) E Dementieva	6	3	6
(Germany) B Lamade	4	6	1
(Netherlands) M Oremans	6^{3}	5
5	(Bulgaria) M Maleeva	7^{7}	7

Quarterfinals
1	(Belgium) K Clijsters	6^{5}	2
(Slovenia) T Pisnik	7^{7}	6
4	(Russia) E Dementieva	6	0	6
5	(Bulgaria) M Maleeva	2	6	1

Semifinals
(Slovenia) T Pisnik	2	0
4	(Russia) E Dementieva	6	6

=== Bottom half ===
First round
6	(Spain) C Torrens Valero	6	6
Alt	(Czech Republic) E Martincová	4	3
(Greece) E Daniilidou	7^{7}	6
(Belarus) T Poutchek	6^{2}	0
(Germany) A Barna	3	4
(Slovenia) K Srebotnik	6	6
(Spain) Á Montolio	3	5
3	(France) A Mauresmo	6	7
8	(Slovakia) M Suchá	7^{7}	7
(Germany) B Rittner	6^{3}	5
(Germany) M Weingärtner	4	5
(Russia) E Bovina	6	7
WC	(Netherlands) E Tamaëla	2	2
(Czech Republic) K Hrdličková	6	6

Second round
6	(Spain) C Torrens Valero	2	2
(Greece) E Daniilidou	6	6
(Slovenia) K Srebotnik	2	1
3	(France) A Mauresmo	6	6
8	(Slovakia) M Suchá	5	3
(Russia) E Bovina	7	6
(Czech Republic) K Hrdličková	1	4
2	(Belgium) J Henin	6	6

Quarterfinals
(Greece) E Daniilidou	6	6
3	(France) A Mauresmo	4	4
(Russia) E Bovina	6^{4}	4
2	(Belgium) J Henin	7^{7}	6

Semifinals
(Greece) E Daniilidou	4	7^{11}	6
2	(Belgium) J Henin	6	6^{9}	3
