= 1994 IPB Czech Indoor =

- Date: 10–16 October
- Edition: 1st
- Category: World Series
- Draw: 32S / 16D
- Prize money: $290,000
- Surface: Carpet / indoor
- Location: Ostrava, Czech Republic
- Venue: ČEZ Aréna

Champions

Singles
- (United States) MaliVai Washington

Doubles
- (Czech Republic) Martin Damm / (Czech Republic) Karel Nováček
- IPB Czech Indoor

The 1994 IPB Czech Indoor was a men's tennis tournament played on indoor carpet courts at the ČEZ Aréna in Ostrava in the Czech Republic and was part of the World Series of the 1994 ATP Tour. It was the inaugural edition of the tournament and took place from 10 October until 16 October 1994. Fifth-seeded MaliVai Washington won the singles title.

== Finals ==
=== Singles ===
(United States) MaliVai Washington defeated (France) Arnaud Boetsch 3–6, 6–4, 6–3

- It was Washington's 1st singles title of the year and the 3rd of his career.

=== Doubles ===
(Czech Republic) Martin Damm / (Czech Republic) Karel Nováček defeated (South Africa) Gary Muller / (South Africa) Piet Norval 6–4, 1–6, 6–3
