= 2003 Ordina Open – Men's doubles =

Men's doubles
- 2003 Ordina Open
- 2002 Champions: (Czech Republic) Martin Damm (Czech Republic) Cyril Suk

Final
- Champions: (Czech Republic) Martin Damm (Czech Republic) Cyril Suk
- Runners-up: (United States) Donald Johnson (India) Leander Paes
- Score: 7–5, 7–6^{(7–4)}

Events
Singles	men	women
Doubles	men	women
- Ordina Open

Martin Damm and Cyril Suk were the defending champions and won in the final 7–5, 7–6^{(7–4)} against Donald Johnson and Leander Paes.

== Seeds ==
Champion seeds are indicated in bold text while text in italics indicates the round in which those seeds were eliminated.

1. (United States) Donald Johnson / (India) Leander Paes (final)
2. (Czech Republic) **Martin Damm** / (Czech Republic) **Cyril Suk (champions)**
3. (Czech Republic) František Čermák / (Czech Republic) Leoš Friedl (quarterfinals)
4. (Czech Republic) Tomáš Cibulec / (Czech Republic) Pavel Vízner (semifinals)

== Draw ==
Key

- Q = Qualifier
- WC = Wild card
- LL = Lucky loser
- Alt = Alternate
- ITF = ITF entry
- PR = Protected ranking
- SR = Special ranking
- SE = Special exempt
- JE = Junior exempt
- JR = Junior Accelerator Programme entrant
- CO = College Accelerator Programme entrant
- NG = Next Gen Accelerator Program entrant
- w/o = Walkover
- r = Retired
- d = Defaulted

First round
1	(United States) **D Johnson** (India) **L Paes**	**6**	**7^{7}**
(Netherlands) S Schalken (Netherlands) J van Lottum	2	6^{5}
(France) **S Grosjean** (Thailand) **P Srichaphan**	**6**	3	**7**
(Argentina) M Rodríguez (Czech Republic) D Škoch	1	**6**	5
3	(Czech Republic) **F Čermák** (Czech Republic) **L Friedl**	4	**6**	**6**
(United States) R Leach (United States) B MacPhie	**6**	3	2
(Netherlands) **R Sluiter** (Netherlands) **M Verkerk**	**6**	**7^{8}**
(United States) D Bowen (Australia) A Fisher	4	6^{6}
WC	(Netherlands) E Kempes (Netherlands) R Wassen	4	6^{3}
(Argentina) **J Acasuso** (Denmark) **K Carlsen**	**6**	**7^{7}**
(France) A Clément (France) A Dupuis	**6**	3	3
4	(Czech Republic) **T Cibulec** (Czech Republic) **P Vízner**	4	**6**	**6**
(Spain) A Portas (Spain) T Robredo	4	6^{5}
WC	(Netherlands) **F Hemmes Jr.** (Netherlands) **D van Scheppingen**	**6**	**7^{7}**
(Italy) M Bertolini (Czech Republic) P Pála	4	4
2	(Czech Republic) **M Damm** (Czech Republic) **C Suk**	**6**	**6**

Quarterfinals
1	(United States) **D Johnson** (India) **L Paes**	**w/o**
(France) S Grosjean (Thailand) P Srichaphan
3	(Czech Republic) F Čermák (Czech Republic) L Friedl	**7^{7}**	6^{3}	0
(Netherlands) **R Sluiter** (Netherlands) **M Verkerk**	6^{5}	**7^{7}**	**6**
(Argentina) J Acasuso (Denmark) K Carlsen	**7^{13}**	3	2
4	(Czech Republic) **T Cibulec** (Czech Republic) **P Vízner**	6^{11}	**6**	**6**
WC	(Netherlands) F Hemmes Jr. (Netherlands) D van Scheppingen	3	6^{1}
2	(Czech Republic) **M Damm** (Czech Republic) **C Suk**	**6**	**7^{7}**

Semifinals
1	(United States) **D Johnson** (India) **L Paes**	**6**	**7^{7}**
(Netherlands) R Sluiter (Netherlands) M Verkerk	3	6^{3}
4	(Czech Republic) T Cibulec (Czech Republic) P Vízner	**6**	6^{3}	1
2	(Czech Republic) **M Damm** (Czech Republic) **C Suk**	2	**7^{7}**	**6**

Final
1	(United States) Donald Johnson (India) Leander Paes	5	6^{4}
2	(Czech Republic) **Martin Damm** (Czech Republic) **Cyril Suk**	**7**	**7^{7}**
