= 2003 Ordina Open =

- Date: 16–22 June
- Edition: 14th (men); 8th (women)
- Category: International Series (men); Tier III (women)
- Surface: Grass / outdoor
- Location: Rosmalen, 's-Hertogenbosch, Netherlands

Champions

Men's singles
- (Netherlands) Sjeng Schalken

Women's singles
- (Belgium) Kim Clijsters

Men's doubles
- (Czech Republic) Martin Damm / (Czech Republic) Cyril Suk

Women's doubles
- (Russia) Elena Dementieva / (Russia) Lina Krasnoroutskaya
- Ordina Open

The 2003 Ordina Open was a tennis tournament played on grass courts in Rosmalen, 's-Hertogenbosch in the Netherlands that was part of the International Series of the 2003 ATP Tour and of Tier III of the 2003 WTA Tour. The tournament was held from 16 June until 22 June 2003. Sjeng Schalken and Kim Clijsters won the singles titles.

== Finals ==
=== Men's singles ===
(Netherlands) Sjeng Schalken defeated (France) Arnaud Clément 6–3, 6–4

- It was Schalken's 1st title of the year and the 8th of his career.

=== Women's singles ===
(Belgium) Kim Clijsters defeated (Belgium) Justine Henin-Hardenne 6–7^{(4–7)}, 3–0 (Henin-Hardenne retired)

- It was Clijsters' 4th title of the year and the 14th of her career.

=== Men's doubles ===
(Czech Republic) Martin Damm / (Czech Republic) Cyril Suk defeated (United States) Donald Johnson / (India) Leander Paes 7–5, 7–6^{(7–4)}

- It was Damm's 2nd title of the year and the 25th of his career. It was Suk's 2nd title of the year and the 26th of his career.

=== Women's doubles ===
(Russia) Elena Dementieva / (Russia) Lina Krasnoroutskaya defeated (Russia) Nadia Petrova / (France) Mary Pierce 2–6, 6–3, 6–4

- It was Dementieva's 2nd title of the year and the 6th of her career. It was Krasnoroutskaya's only title of the year and the 1st of her career.
