= Jiří Pelikán (tennis) =

Czech tennis player (born 1970)

- Country (sports): Czech Republic
- Born: 9 May 1970 (age 55); Ostrava, Czechoslovakia
- Height: 6 ft 5 in (196 cm)
- Prize money: $17,550

Singles
- Highest ranking: No. 280 (10 Jul 1995)

Grand Slam singles results
- Wimbledon: Q1 (1995)

Doubles
- Career record: 0–1
- Highest ranking: No. 219 (19 Aug 1996)

Jiří Pelikán (born 9 May 1970) is a Czech former professional tennis player.

Born in Ostrava, Pelikán competed on the professional tour in the 1990s, reaching a best singles ranking of 208 in the world. He was a semi-finalist at the Poznan Challenger in 1992 and featured in the qualifying draw of the 1995 Wimbledon Championships. His only ATP Tour main draw appearance came in doubles, at the 1994 Czech Indoor.

Pelikán coaches at the TJ Start Ostrava tennis club.
