= 1995 IPB Czech Indoor – Singles =

Singles
- 1995 IPB Czech Indoor

Final
- Champion: (South Africa) Wayne Ferreira
- Runner-up: (United States) MaliVai Washington
- Score: 3–6, 6–4, 6–3

Details
- Draw: 32 (3WC/4Q/2LL)
- Seeds: 8

Events
Singles	Doubles
- Ostrava Open

MaliVai Washington was the defending champion, but lost in the final to Wayne Ferreira. The score was 3–6, 6–4, 6–3.

== Seeds ==
1. (Russia) Yevgeny Kafelnikov (first round)
2. (n/a)
3. (South Africa) Wayne Ferreira (champion)
4. (Ukraine) Andrei Medvedev (quarterfinals)
5. (Czech Republic) Petr Korda (first round)
6. (France) Arnaud Boetsch (semifinals)
7. (Sweden) Jonas Björkman (quarterfinals)
8. (Argentina) Javier Frana (first round)

== Draw ==
Key

- Q = Qualifier
- WC = Wild card
- LL = Lucky loser
- Alt = Alternate
- ITF = ITF entry
- PR = Protected ranking
- SR = Special ranking
- SE = Special exempt
- JE = Junior exempt
- JR = Junior Accelerator Programme entrant
- CO = College Accelerator Programme entrant
- NG = Next Gen Accelerator Program entrant
- w/o = Walkover
- r = Retired
- d = Defaulted

=== Finals ===
Semifinals
Q	(Germany) Patrik Kühnen	2	5
3	(South Africa) Wayne Ferreira	6	7
6	(France) Arnaud Boetsch	3	2
(United States) MaliVai Washington	6	6

Final
3	(South Africa) Wayne Ferreira	3	6	6
(United States) MaliVai Washington	6	4	3

=== Top half ===
First round
1	(Russia) Y Kafelnikov	2	4
(Czech Republic) B Ulihrach	6	6
Q	(Germany) P Kühnen	1	6	7^{8}
(United Kingdom) G Rusedski	6	3	6^{6}
(Germany) D Prinosil	6	2	6
(Germany) M Sinner	1	6	1
Q	(Netherlands) J Winnink	3	7	7^{7}
8	(Argentina) J Frana	6	5	6^{5}
3	(South Africa) W Ferreira	6	6
WC	(Czech Republic) Otakar Jurecka	1	4
(Romania) A Voinea	2	6	5
(Czech Republic) M Damm	6	3	7
Q	(Netherlands) T Nijssen	7^{7}	3	6^{3}
(Australia) P Rafter	6^{5}	6	7^{7}
(Czech Republic) J Novák	6	6^{2}	6
5/WC	(Czech Republic) P Korda	2	7^{7}	0

Second round
(Czech Republic) B Ulihrach	7	3	0
Q	(Germany) P Kühnen	5	6	6
(Germany) D Prinosil	6^{4}	2
Q	(Netherlands) J Winnink	7^{7}	6
3	(South Africa) W Ferreira	6	7^{7}
(Czech Republic) M Damm	4	6^{5}
(Australia) P Rafter	6	6
(Czech Republic) J Novák	3	2

Quarterfinals
Q	(Germany) P Kühnen	4	6	6
Q	(Netherlands) J Winnink	6	1	1
3	(South Africa) W Ferreira	6	6
(Australia) P Rafter	4	4

Semifinals
Q	(Germany) P Kühnen	2	5
3	(South Africa) W Ferreira	6	7

=== Bottom half ===
First round
6	(France) A Boetsch	6^{4}	6	7^{9}
(Czech Republic) D Vacek	7^{7}	4	6^{7}
(Russia) A Chesnokov	3	6	3
WC	(Germany) N Kiefer	6	3	6
(France) J Golmard	3	3
(France) O Delaître	6	6
Q	(Switzerland) L Manta	4	6	1
4	(Ukraine) A Medvedev	6	3	6
7	(Sweden) J Björkman	7^{7}	7
(France) C Pioline	6^{5}	5
(Czech Republic) K Nováček	3	6	7^{7}
(France) L Roux	6	3	6^{4}
LL	(Czech Republic) P Luxa	1	3
(United States) MV Washington	6	6
(France) G Forget	6	6
LL	(Czech Republic) J Bulant	2	4

Second round
6	(France) A Boetsch	7	6
WC	(Germany) N Kiefer	5	3
(France) O Delaître	4	4
4	(Ukraine) A Medvedev	6	6
7	(Sweden) J Björkman	6	4	7
(Czech Republic) K Nováček	4	6	5
(United States) MV Washington	7^{7}	6
(France) G Forget	6^{2}	4

Quarterfinals
6	(France) A Boetsch	6	6
4	(Ukraine) A Medvedev	1	1
7	(Sweden) J Björkman	2	4
(United States) MV Washington	6	6

Semifinals
6	(France) A Boetsch	3	2
(United States) MV Washington	6	6
