= Topsportcentrum =

Topsportcentrum may refer to:

- Topsportcentrum Rotterdam, Netherlands
- Topsportcentrum (Almere), Netherlands
- Landstede Sportcentrum, Zwolle, Netherlands
- Flanders Sports Arena, Ghent, Belgium
