= ATP Bolzano =

Defunct tennis tournament
- Tour: ATP Tour
- Founded: 1992
- Abolished: 1993
- Editions: 2
- Location: Bolzano, Italy
- Surface: Carpet

The ATP Bolzano was a men's tennis tournament played in Bolzano, Italy. The event was played as part of the ATP World Series of the ATP Tour in 1992 and 1993. It was played on indoor carpet courts.

According to the ATP website, its place in the calendar was preceded by the European Indoor Championships in Berlin (1990 and 1991) and followed by the IPB Czech Indoor in Ostrava (1994 to 1998).

== Finals ==
=== Singles ===
Year	Champions	Runners-up	Score
1992	(Sweden) Thomas Enqvist	(France) Arnaud Boetsch	6–2, 1–6, 7–6
1993	(United States) Jonathan Stark	(France) Cédric Pioline	6–3, 6–2

=== Doubles ===
Year	Champions	Runners-up	Score
1992	(Sweden) Anders Järryd (Norway) Bent-Ove Pedersen	(Netherlands) Tom Nijssen (Czechoslovakia) Cyril Suk	6–1, 6–7, 6–3
1993	(Netherlands) Hendrik Jan Davids (South Africa) Piet Norval	(South Africa) David Adams (Russia) Andrei Olhovskiy	6–3, 6–2
