= 2002 Ordina Open – Men's doubles =

Men's doubles
- 2002 Ordina Open
- 2001 Champions: (Netherlands) Paul Haarhuis (Netherlands) Sjeng Schalken

Final
- Champions: (Czech Republic) Martin Damm (Czech Republic) Cyril Suk
- Runners-up: (Netherlands) Paul Haarhuis (United States) Brian MacPhie
- Score: 7–6^{(8–6)}, 6–7^{(6–8)}, 6–4

Details
- Draw: 16
- Seeds: 4

Events
Singles	men	women
Doubles	men	women
- Ordina Open

Paul Haarhuis and Sjeng Schalken were the defending champions but they competed with different partners that year, Haarhuis with Brian MacPhie and Schalken with Julien Boutter.

Boutter and Schalken lost in the first round to Gastón Etlis and Martín García.

Haarhuis and MacPhie lost in the final 7–6^{(8–6)}, 6–7^{(6–8)}, 6–4 against Martin Damm and Cyril Suk.

== Seeds ==
Champion seeds are indicated in bold text while text in italics indicates the round in which those seeds were eliminated.

1. (Czech Republic) **Martin Damm** / (Czech Republic) **Cyril Suk (champions)**
2. (Netherlands) Paul Haarhuis / (United States) Brian MacPhie (final)
3. (France) Julien Boutter / (Netherlands) Sjeng Schalken (first round)
4. (Australia) Michael Hill / (Czech Republic) Daniel Vacek (first round)

== Draw ==
Key

- Q = Qualifier
- WC = Wild card
- LL = Lucky loser
- Alt = Alternate
- ITF = ITF entry
- PR = Protected ranking
- SR = Special ranking
- SE = Special exempt
- JE = Junior exempt
- JR = Junior Accelerator Programme entrant
- CO = College Accelerator Programme entrant
- NG = Next Gen Accelerator Program entrant
- w/o = Walkover
- r = Retired
- d = Defaulted

First round
1	(Czech Republic) **M Damm** (Czech Republic) **C Suk**	**6**	**6**
WC	(United States) M Chang (Netherlands) J van Lottum	4	4
(Argentina) M Rodríguez (Belgium) T Vanhoudt	**7**	5	4
(Argentina) **A Calleri** (Argentina) **G Cañas**	5	**7**	**6**
3	(France) J Boutter (Netherlands) S Schalken	4	3
(Argentina) **G Etlis** (Argentina) **M García**	**6**	**6**
(Czech Republic) **T Cibulec** (Czech Republic) **L Friedl**	**7^{8}**	**6**
(France) A Clément (France) N Escudé	6^{6}	3
(South Africa) **D Adams** (Russia) **A Olhovskiy**	**6**	**6**
WC	(Netherlands) S Groen (Netherlands) R Sluiter	1	3
WC	(Netherlands) **M Koning** (Netherlands) **B van der Valk**	6^{8}	**6**	**7^{7}**
4	(Australia) M Hill (Czech Republic) D Vacek	**7^{10}**	2	6^{5}
(Spain) T Robredo (Russia) M Youzhny	3	**6**	4
(Germany) **K Braasch** (Germany) **M Kohlmann**	**6**	4	**6**
(Czech Republic) P Pála (Czech Republic) P Vízner	6^{2}	6^{2}
2	(Netherlands) **P Haarhuis** (United States) **B MacPhie**	**7^{7}**	**7^{7}**

Quarterfinals
1	(Czech Republic) **M Damm** (Czech Republic) **C Suk**	**6**	**6**
(Argentina) A Calleri (Argentina) G Cañas	1	4
(Argentina) G Etlis (Argentina) M García	4	**6**	6^{10}
(Czech Republic) **T Cibulec** (Czech Republic) **L Friedl**	**6**	2	**7^{12}**
(South Africa) **D Adams** (Russia) **A Olhovskiy**	**6**	**7**
WC	(Netherlands) M Koning (Netherlands) B van der Valk	3	5
(Germany) K Braasch (Germany) M Kohlmann	**7^{10}**	2	4
2	(Netherlands) **P Haarhuis** (United States) **B MacPhie**	6^{8}	**6**	**6**

Semifinals
1	(Czech Republic) **M Damm** (Czech Republic) **C Suk**	6^{6}	**7^{7}**	**7**
(Czech Republic) T Cibulec (Czech Republic) L Friedl	**7^{8}**	6^{3}	5
(South Africa) D Adams (Russia) A Olhovskiy	6^{2}	**6**	6^{2}
2	(Netherlands) **P Haarhuis** (United States) **B MacPhie**	**7^{7}**	4	**7^{7}**

Final
1	(Czech Republic) **Martin Damm** (Czech Republic) **Cyril Suk**	**7^{8}**	6^{6}	**6**
2	(Netherlands) Paul Haarhuis (United States) Brian MacPhie	6^{6}	**7^{8}**	4
