= 1995 IPB Czech Indoor =

- Date: 9–15 October
- Edition: 2nd
- Category: World Series
- Draw: 32S / 16D
- Prize money: $375,000
- Surface: Carpet / indoor
- Location: Ostrava, Czech Republic
- Venue: ČEZ Aréna

Champions

Singles
- (South Africa) Wayne Ferreira

Doubles
- (Sweden) Jonas Björkman / (Argentina) Javier Frana
- IPB Czech Indoor

The 1995 IPB Czech Indoor was a men's tennis tournament played on indoor carpet courts at the ČEZ Aréna in Ostrava in the Czech Republic and was part of the World Series of the 1995 ATP Tour. It was the second edition of the tournament and took place from 9 October until 15 October 1995. Third-seeded Wayne Ferreira won the singles title.

== Finals ==
=== Singles ===
(South Africa) Wayne Ferreira defeated (United States) MaliVai Washington 3–6, 6–4, 6–3

- It was Ferreira's 3rd singles title of the year and the 10th of his career.

=== Doubles ===
(Sweden) Jonas Björkman / (Argentina) Javier Frana defeated (France) Guy Forget / (Australia) Patrick Rafter 6–7, 6–4, 7–6
