= 2003 Ordina Open – Women's singles =

Women's singles
- 2003 Ordina Open

Final
- Champion: (Belgium) Kim Clijsters
- Runner-up: (Belgium) Justine Henin-Hardenne
- Score: 6–7^{(4–7)}, 3–0, retired

Details
- Draw: 30 (2WC/2Alt)
- Seeds: 8

Events
Singles	men	women
Doubles	men	women
← 2002 ·	Rosmalen Grass Court Championships	· 2004 →

Eleni Daniilidou was the defending champion, but did not compete this year.

Kim Clijsters won the title after Justine Henin-Hardenne was forced to retire due to a left wrist injury. The score was 6–7^{(4–7)}, 3–0.

== Seeds ==
The first two seeds received a bye into the second round.

1. (Belgium) Kim Clijsters (champion)
2. (Belgium) Justine Henin-Hardenne (final, retired due to a left wrist strain)
3. (France) Amélie Mauresmo (second round)
4. (Russia) Elena Dementieva (quarterfinals)
5. (Russia) Nadia Petrova (semifinals)
6. (Uzbekistan) Iroda Tulyaganova (quarterfinals)
7. (United States) Ashley Harkleroad (first round)
8. (Slovenia) Katarina Srebotnik (second round)

== Draw ==
=== Key ===
- Q = Qualifier
- WC = Wild card
- LL = Lucky loser
- Alt = Alternate
- SE = Special exempt
- PR = Protected ranking
- ITF = ITF entry
- JE = Junior exempt
- w/o = Walkover
- r = Retired
- d = Defaulted
- SR = Special ranking

=== Finals ===
Semifinals
1	(Belgium) Kim Clijsters	6	6
Alt	(Germany) Barbara Rittner	2	1
5/WC	(Russia) Nadia Petrova	7	6^{5}	3
2	(Belgium) Justine Henin-Hardenne	5	7^{7}	6

Final
1	(Belgium) Kim Clijsters	6^{4}	3
2	(Belgium) Justine Henin-Hardenne	7^{7}	0^{r}

=== Top half ===
First round
(Zimbabwe) C Black	6	6
(Slovakia) H Nagyová	3	2
(Slovenia) T Pisnik	6	6
(Italy) F Pennetta	3	1
(Slovenia) M Matevžič	2	4
8	(Slovenia) K Srebotnik	6	6
3	(France) A Mauresmo	1	7^{7}	6
(France) M Bartoli	6	6^{5}	4
Alt	(Germany) B Rittner	6	6
(Italy) R Grande	1	3
(Spain) V Ruano Pascual	1	0
(Germany) A Barna	6	6
(Russia) L Krasnoroutskaya	3	0
6	(Uzbekistan) I Tulyaganova	6	6

Second round
1	(Belgium) K Clijsters	6	6
(Zimbabwe) C Black	4	4
(Slovenia) T Pisnik	3	6	6
8	(Slovenia) K Srebotnik	6	3	4
3	(France) A Mauresmo	7^{7}	0	5
Alt	(Germany) B Rittner	6^{1}	6	7
(Germany) A Barna	3	3
6	(Uzbekistan) I Tulyaganova	6	6

Quarterfinals
1	(Belgium) K Clijsters	7^{7}	7^{7}
(Slovenia) T Pisnik	6^{4}	6^{4}
Alt	(Germany) B Rittner	6	6
6	(Uzbekistan) I Tulyaganova	2	1

Semifinals
1	(Belgium) K Clijsters	6	6
Alt	(Germany) B Rittner	2	1

=== Bottom half ===
First round
5/WC	(Russia) N Petrova	6	3	6
(Indonesia) A Widjaja	4	6	2
(France) S Cohen-Aloro	7	6
(Czech Republic) I Benešová	5	2
(South Korea) Y-j Cho	4	1
(Belgium) E Callens	6	6
(France) É Loit	6^{3}	5
4	(Russia) E Dementieva	7^{7}	7
7	(United States) A Harkleroad	7^{7}	3	4
(Germany) M Weingärtner	6^{4}	6	6
(Slovakia) Ľ Cervanová	6	6
WC	(Netherlands) M Krajicek	3	1
Alt	(Spain) M Sánchez Lorenzo	7	6
(Australia) N Pratt	5	2

Second round
5/WC	(Russia) N Petrova	4	6	6
(France) S Cohen-Aloro	6	2	0
(Belgium) E Callens	2	1
4	(Russia) E Dementieva	6	6
(Germany) M Weingärtner	5	1
(Slovakia) Ľ Cervanová	7	6
Alt	(Spain) M Sánchez Lorenzo	4	3
2	(Belgium) J Henin-Hardenne	6	6

Quarterfinals
5/WC	(Russia) N Petrova	6	3	6
4	(Russia) E Dementieva	4	6	2
(Slovakia) Ľ Cervanová	6	5	3
2	(Belgium) J Henin-Hardenne	3	7	6

Semifinals
5/WC	(Russia) N Petrova	7	6^{5}	3
2	(Belgium) J Henin-Hardenne	5	7^{7}	6
