= 1997 IPB Czech Indoor =

- Date: 13–19 October
- Edition: 4th
- Category: World Series
- Draw: 32S / 16D
- Prize money: $975,000
- Surface: Carpet / indoor
- Location: Ostrava, Czech Republic
- Venue: ČEZ Aréna

Champions

Singles
- (Slovakia) Karol Kučera

Doubles
- (Czech Republic) Jiří Novák / (Czech Republic) David Rikl
- IPB Czech Indoor

The 1997 IPB Czech Indoor was a men's tennis tournament played on indoor carpet courts at the ČEZ Aréna in Ostrava in the Czech Republic and was part of the World Series of the 1997 ATP Tour. It was the fourth edition of the tournament and was held from 13 October through 19 October 1997. Eighth-seeded Karol Kučera won the singles title.

== Finals ==
=== Singles ===
(Slovakia) Karol Kučera defeated (Sweden) Magnus Norman 6–2 retired

- It was Kučera's 1st singles title of the year and the 2nd of his career.

=== Doubles ===
(Czech Republic) Jiří Novák / (Czech Republic) David Rikl defeated (United States) Donald Johnson / (United States) Francisco Montana 6–2, 6–4
