= Paul Logtens =

Dutch tennis player

- Country (sports): Netherlands
- Residence: Boxmeer, Netherlands
- Born: 7 November 1979 (age 46) Boxmeer, Netherlands
- Height: 1.75 m (5 ft 9 in)
- Plays: Right-handed
- Prize money: $58,333

Singles
- Career record: 0–2 (at ATP Tour level, Grand Slam level, and in Davis Cup)
- Career titles: 0
- Highest ranking: No. 269 (4 July 2005)

Doubles
- Career record: 0–0 (at ATP Tour level, Grand Slam level, and in Davis Cup)
- Career titles: 0
- Highest ranking: No. 254 (23 May 2005)
- Last updated on: 25 June 2018.

Paul Logtens (born 7 November 1979) is a former Dutch tennis player.

Logtens has a career high ATP singles ranking of 269 achieved on 4 July 2005. He also has a career high ATP doubles ranking of 254 achieved on 23 May 2005.

Logtens made his ATP main draw debut at the 2003 Ordina Open after qualifying for the singles main draw.

In 2022 he was appointed as a member of the executive board at the University of Humanistic Studies in Utrecht. He was named chairman of OJC Rosmalen in 2023.

== Personal life ==
Logtens has a wife, Marlou, and two children.
