= Ján Krošlák =

Slovak tennis player

- Country (sports): Slovakia
- Residence: Bratislava, Slovakia
- Born: 17 October 1974 (age 51) Bratislava, Czechoslovakia
- Height: 1.88 m (6 ft 2 in)
- Turned pro: 1993
- Plays: Right-handed (two-handed backhand)
- Coach: Michal Krotiouk
- Prize money: $1,169,329

Singles
- Career record: 76–96
- Career titles: 2
- Highest ranking: No. 53 (13 September 1999)

Grand Slam singles results
- Australian Open: 3R (1999)
- French Open: 1R (1996, 1997, 1999)
- Wimbledon: 3R (1996)
- US Open: 3R (1999)

Other tournaments
- Olympic Games: 1R (1996)

Doubles
- Career record: 12–14
- Career titles: 0
- Highest ranking: No. 215 (23 June 1997)

Other doubles tournaments
- Olympic Games: 1R (1996)

Ján Krošlák (Slovak pronunciation: [jaːn ˈkrɔʂlaːk]; born 17 October 1974) is a former tennis player from Slovakia, who turned professional in 1993.

He represented his native country at the 1996 Summer Olympics in Atlanta, United States, where he was defeated in the first round by America's MaliVai Washington. The right-hander reached his career-high ATP singles ranking of world No. 53 in September 1999. He won two singles titles on the ATP Tour.

In the 1998 Davis Cup, he played with Martin Hromec.

== Political career ==
In 2020, Krošlák was elected an MP of the National Council of Slovakia, representing the Ordinary People and Independent Personalities along with fellow former tennis players Karol Kučera and Romana Tabak. He departed from the OĽaNO caucus in 2021, joining We Are Family parliamentary group. In December 2022, Krošlák was one of the crucial MPs in a vote of no confidence to Heger's Cabinet. He stated he would declare no confidence and, in so doing, go against the We Are Family parliamentary caucus. He departed from the caucus along with Martin Borguľa on 13 December and announced that he was considering a move to a different political party ahead of the next parliamentary elections, naming HLAS-SD as a potential destination.

== ATP career finals ==
=== Singles: 3 (2 titles, 1 runner-up) ===
Legend Grand Slam Tournaments (0–0) ATP World Tour Finals (0–0) ATP Masters Series (0–0) ATP Championship Series (0–0) ATP World Series (2–1)	Finals by surface Hard (1–0) Clay (0–0) Grass (0–0) Carpet (1–1)	Finals by setting Outdoors (1–0) Indoors (1–1)

Result	W–L	Date	Tournament	Tier	Surface	Opponent	Score
Win	1–0	Oct 1995	Tel Aviv, Israel	Grand Prix	Hard	(Spain) Javier Sánchez	6–4, 6–2
Win	2–0	Feb 1997	Shanghai, China	World Series	Carpet	(Russia) Alexander Volkov	6–2, 7–6^{(7–2)}
Loss	2–1	Oct 1998	Ostrava, Czech Republic	World Series	Carpet	(United States) Andre Agassi	2–6, 6–3, 3–6

=== Doubles: 1 (1 runner-up) ===
Legend Grand Slam Tournaments (0–0) ATP World Tour Finals (0–0) ATP Masters Series (0–0) ATP Championship Series (0–0) ATP World Series (0–1)	Finals by surface Hard (0–0) Clay (0–0) Grass (0–0) Carpet (0–1)	Finals by setting Outdoors (0–0) Indoors (0–1)

Result	W–L	Date	Tournament	Tier	Surface	Partnet	Opponents	Score
Loss	0–1	Oct 1996	Ostrava, Czech Republic	World Series	Carpet	(Slovakia) Karol Kučera	(Australia) Sandon Stolle (Czech Republic) Cyril Suk	6–7, 3–6

== ATP Challenger and ITF Futures finals ==
=== Singles: 6 (2–4) ===
Legend ATP Challenger (2–3) ITF Futures (0–1)	Finals by surface Hard (0–2) Clay (0–2) Grass (1–0) Carpet (1–0)

Result	W–L	Date	Tournament	Tier	Surface	Opponent	Score
Win	1–0	Dec 1994	Perth, Australia	Challenger	Grass	(United States) Kent Kinnear	6–1, 6–2
Win	2–0	Feb 1995	Hambühren, Germany	Challenger	Carpet	(United Kingdom) Chris Wilkinson	7–6, 6–3
Loss	2–1	May 1995	Sliema, Malta	Challenger	Hard	(Romania) Adrian Voinea	3–6, 4–6
Loss	2–2	Nov 1996	Portorož, Slovenia	Challenger	Hard	(Italy) Gianluca Pozzi	6–7, 7–6, 2–6
Loss	2–3	May 1998	Kyiv, Ukraine	Challenger	Clay	(Socialist Federal Republic of Yugoslavia) Nenad Zimonjic	3–6, 3–6
Loss	2–4	Aug 2007	Slovakia F3, Bratislava	Futures	Clay	(Slovakia) Filip Polasek	4–6, 1–6

=== Doubles: 2 (1–1) ===
Legend ATP Challenger (0–0) ITF Futures (1–1)	Finals by surface Hard (0–1) Clay (1–0) Grass (0–0) Carpet (0–0)

Result	W–L	Date	Tournament	Tier	Surface	Partner	Opponents	Score
Win	1–0	Jul 2002	Slovakia F1, Bratislava	Futures	Clay	(Slovakia) Branislav Sekac	(Slovakia) Boris Borgula (Germany) Ivo Klec	6–1, 6–7^{(2–7)}, 7–6^{(7–4)}
Loss	1–1	Sep 2003	Jamaica F7, Montego Bay	Futures	Hard	(Slovakia) David Sebok	(United States) Andrew Carlson (United States) Trevor Spracklin	1–6, 4–6

== Performance timeline ==
Key
W	F	SF	QF	#R	RR	Q#	DNQ	A	NH

(W) winner; (F) finalist; (SF) semifinalist; (QF) quarterfinalist; (#R) rounds 4, 3, 2, 1; (RR) round-robin stage; (Q#) qualification round; (DNQ) did not qualify; (A) absent; (NH) not held; (SR) strike rate (events won / competed); (W–L) win–loss record.

=== Singles ===
Tournament	1995	1996	1997	1998	1999	2000	2001	2002	SR	W–L	Win %
Grand Slam tournaments
Australian Open	2R	A	2R	1R	3R	2R	Q3	Q1	0 / 5	5–5	50%
French Open	Q2	1R	1R	A	1R	A	A	A	0 / 3	0–3	0%
Wimbledon	1R	3R	1R	Q1	1R	A	Q2	Q1	0 / 4	2–4	33%
US Open	Q1	2R	2R	A	3R	Q3	Q1	A	0 / 3	4–3	57%
Win–loss	1–2	3–3	2–4	0–1	4–4	1–1	0–0	0–0	0 / 15	11–15	42%
National Representation
Summer Olympics	NH	1R	Not Held			A	NH		0 / 1	0–1	0%
ATP Masters Series
Indian Wells	A	Q1	A	A	A	1R	A	A	0 / 1	0–1	0%
Miami	A	1R	A	A	3R	Q1	A	A	0 / 2	2–2	50%
Monte Carlo	A	A	Q1	A	A	A	A	A	0 / 0	0–0	–
Hamburg	A	A	A	A	1R	A	A	A	0 / 1	0–1	0%
Rome	A	A	A	A	Q1	A	A	A	0 / 0	0–0	–
Canada	A	A	A	A	1R	A	A	A	0 / 1	0–1	0%
Cincinnati	A	Q3	A	A	1R	Q1	A	A	0 / 1	0–1	0%
Paris	A	Q3	Q1	1R	Q1	A	A	A	0 / 1	0–1	0%
Win–loss	0–0	0–1	0–0	0–1	2–4	0–1	0–0	0–0	0 / 7	2–7	22%
