= IPB Czech Indoor =

Tournament information
- Tour: ATP Tour
- Founded: 1994
- Abolished: 1998
- Editions: 5
- Location: Ostrava, Czech Republic
- Category: ATP World Series
- Surface: Carpet (indoors)

The Czech Indoor was a men's tennis tournament that was part of the World Series of the ATP Tour. It was held at the ČEZ Aréna in Ostrava, Czech Republic, on indoor carpet courts.

According to the ATP website, its place in the calendar was preceded by the ATP Bolzano (1992 and 1993).

== Results ==
=== Singles ===
Location	Year	Champions	Runners-up	Score
Ostrava
Ostrava	1994	(United States) MaliVai Washington	(France) Arnaud Boetsch	4–6, 6–3, 6–3
Ostrava	1995	(South Africa) Wayne Ferreira	(United States) MaliVai Washington	3–6, 6–4, 6–3
Ostrava	1996	(Germany) David Prinosil	(Czech Republic) Petr Korda	6–1, 6–2
Ostrava	1997	(Slovakia) Karol Kučera	(Sweden) Magnus Norman	6–2, ret.
Ostrava	1998	(United States) Andre Agassi	(Slovakia) Ján Krošlák	6–2, 3–6, 6–3

=== Doubles ===
Location	Year	Champions	Runners-up	Score
Ostrava
Ostrava	1994	(Czech Republic) Martin Damm (Czech Republic) Karel Nováček	(South Africa) Gary Muller (South Africa) Piet Norval	6–4, 1–6, 6–3
Ostrava	1995	(Sweden) Jonas Björkman (Argentina) Javier Frana	(France) Guy Forget (Australia) Patrick Rafter	6–7, 6–4, 7–6
Ostrava	1996	(Australia) Sandon Stolle (Czech Republic) Cyril Suk	(Slovakia) Ján Krošlák (Slovakia) Karol Kučera	7–6, 6–3
Ostrava	1997	(Czech Republic) Jiří Novák (Czech Republic) David Rikl	(United States) Donald Johnson (United States) Francisco Montana	6–2, 6–4
Ostrava	1998	(Germany) Nicolas Kiefer (Germany) David Prinosil	(South Africa) David Adams (Czech Republic) Pavel Vízner	6–4, 6–3
