= Piet Norval =

South African tennis player

- Country (sports): South Africa
- Residence: Cape Town, South Africa
- Born: 7 April 1970 (age 55); Cape Town, South Africa
- Height: 1.85 m (6 ft 1 in)
- Turned pro: 1988
- Retired: 2001
- Plays: Right-handed
- Prize money: $1,832,303

Singles
- Career record: 4–12
- Career titles: 0
- Highest ranking: No. 125 (19 June 1989)

Doubles
- Career record: 329–300
- Career titles: 14
- Highest ranking: No. 16 (16 January 1995)

Grand Slam doubles results
- Australian Open: QF (1997)
- French Open: QF (1993)
- Wimbledon: SF (1991)
- US Open: QF (1998)

Grand Slam mixed doubles results
- French Open: W (1999)
Medal record
Olympic Games
Silver medal – second place	1992 Barcelona	Doubles

Pieter ("Piet") Norval (born 7 April 1970) is a former tennis player from South Africa, who turned professional in 1988. His most notable achievement was winning the mixed doubles at the French Open in 1999. The right-hander represented his native country in the doubles competition at the 1992 Summer Olympics in Barcelona, where he partnered Wayne Ferreira. The pair won the silver medal, after losing the final to Boris Becker and Michael Stich from Germany. Norval reached his highest singles ATP-ranking on 19 June 1989, when he became the no. 125 of the world.

== Retirement ==
After retiring in 2001 from professional tennis, Norval set up and currently runs a tennis academy in Hartbeespoort.

== Major finals ==
=== Olympic finals ===
==== Doubles: 1 (1 silver medal) ====
Result	Year	Championship	Surface	Partner	Opponents	Score
Silver	1992	Barcelona Olympics	Clay	Wayne Ferreira (RSA)	(Germany) Boris Becker (Germany) Michael Stich	6–7^{(5–7)}, 6–4, 6–7^{(5–7)}, 3–6

=== Year-end championships finals ===
==== Doubles: 1 (1–0) ====
Result	Year	Championship	Surface	Partner	Opponents	Score
Win	2000	Bangalore	Hard	(United States) Donald Johnson	(India) Mahesh Bhupathi (India) Leander Paes	7–6^{(10–8)}, 6–3, 6–4

== Career finals ==
=== Doubles: 35 (14–21) ===
Legend Grand Slam (0) Year-end championships (1) ATP Masters Series (2) ATP Championship Series (1) ATP Tour (10)	Titles by surface Hard (4) Clay (5) Grass (2) Carpet (3)

Result	No.	Date	Tournament	Surface	Partner	Opponents	Score
Win	1.	Mar 1991	Key Biscayne, USA	Hard	(South Africa) Wayne Ferreira	(United States) Ken Flach (United States) Robert Seguso	5–7, 7–6, 6–2
Loss	1.	Apr 1992	Johannesburg, South Africa	Hard	(South Africa) Wayne Ferreira	(South Africa) Pieter Aldrich (South Africa) Danie Visser	4–6, 4–6
Loss	2.	Aug 1992	Summer Olympics, Barcelona, Spain	Clay	(South Africa) Wayne Ferreira	(Germany) Boris Becker (Germany) Michael Stich	6–7, 6–4, 6–7, 3–6
Win	2.	Mar 1993	Casablanca, Morocco	Clay	(United States) Mike Bauer	(Latvia) Ģirts Dzelde (Croatia) Goran Prpić	7–5, 7–6
Loss	3.	Jul 1993	Gstaad, Switzerland	Clay	(Netherlands) Hendrik Jan Davids	(France) Cédric Pioline (Switzerland) Marc Rosset	3–6, 6–3, 6–7
Loss	4.	Jul 1993	Stuttgart, Germany	Clay	(South Africa) Gary Muller	(Netherlands) Tom Nijssen (Czech Republic) Cyril Suk	6–7, 3–6
Win	3.	Oct 1993	Bolzano, Italy	Carpet	(Netherlands) Hendrik Jan Davids	(South Africa) David Adams (Russia) Andrei Olhovskiy	6–3, 6–2
Loss	5.	Feb 1994	Milan, Italy	Carpet	(Netherlands) Hendrik Jan Davids	(Netherlands) Tom Nijssen (Czech Republic) Cyril Suk	6–4, 6–7, 6–7
Loss	6.	Apr 1994	Nice, France	Clay	(Netherlands) Hendrik Jan Davids	(Spain) Javier Sánchez (Australia) Mark Woodforde	5–7, 3–6
Win	4.	May 1994	Hamburg, Germany	Clay	(United States) Scott Melville	(Sweden) Henrik Holm (Sweden) Anders Järryd	6–3, 6–4
Win	5.	Jul 1994	Stuttgart, Germany	Clay	(United States) Scott Melville	(Netherlands) Jacco Eltingh (Netherlands) Paul Haarhuis	7–6, 7–5
Loss	7.	Oct 1994	Ostrava, Czech Republic	Carpet	(South Africa) Gary Muller	(Czech Republic) Martin Damm (Czech Republic) Karel Nováček	4–6, 6–1, 3–6
Loss	8.	Mar 1995	Indian Wells, USA	Hard	(South Africa) Gary Muller	(United States) Tommy Ho (New Zealand) Brett Steven	4–6, 6–7
Loss	9.	Oct 1995	Palermo, Italy	Clay	(Netherlands) Hendrik Jan Davids	(Spain) Àlex Corretja (France) Fabrice Santoro	7–6, 4–6, 3–6
Loss	10.	Apr 1996	Barcelona, Spain	Clay	(United Kingdom) Neil Broad	(Argentina) Luis Lobo (Spain) Javier Sánchez	1–6, 3–6
Loss	11.	Jun 1996	Nottingham, UK	Grass	(United Kingdom) Neil Broad	(United Kingdom) Mark Petchey (United Kingdom) Danny Sapsford	7–6, 6–7, 4–6
Win	6.	Jul 1996	Newport, USA	Grass	(South Africa) Marius Barnard	(Australia) Paul Kilderry (Australia) Michael Tebbutt	6–7, 6–4, 6–4
Win	7.	Aug 1996	Los Angeles, USA	Hard	(South Africa) Marius Barnard	(Sweden) Jonas Björkman (Sweden) Nicklas Kulti	7–5, 6–2
Loss	12.	Oct 1996	Lyon, France	Carpet	(United Kingdom) Neil Broad	(United States) Jim Grabb (United States) Richey Reneberg	2–6, 1–6
Loss	13.	May 1997	Hamburg, Germany	Clay	(United Kingdom) Neil Broad	(Argentina) Luis Lobo (Spain) Javier Sánchez	3–6, 6–7
Loss	14.	Mar 1998	Rotterdam, Netherlands	Carpet	(United Kingdom) Neil Broad	(Netherlands) Jacco Eltingh (Netherlands) Paul Haarhuis	6–7, 3–6
Loss	15.	Jul 1998	Båstad, Sweden	Clay	(South Africa) Lan Bale	(Sweden) Magnus Gustafsson (Sweden) Magnus Larsson	4–6, 2–6
Win	8.	Aug 1998	Umag, Croatia	Clay	(United Kingdom) Neil Broad	(Czech Republic) Jiří Novák (Czech Republic) David Rikl	6–1, 3–6, 6–3
Loss	16.	Oct 1998	Basel, Switzerland	Hard (i)	(Zimbabwe) Kevin Ullyett	(France) Olivier Delaître (France) Fabrice Santoro	3–6, 6–7
Loss	17.	Jan 1999	Doha, Qatar	Hard	(Zimbabwe) Kevin Ullyett	(United States) Alex O'Brien (United States) Jared Palmer	3–6, 4–6
Loss	18.	Oct 1999	Vienna, Austria	Hard (i)	(Zimbabwe) Kevin Ullyett	(Germany) David Prinosil (Australia) Sandon Stolle	3–6, 4–6
Win	9.	Oct 1999	Lyon, France	Carpet	(Zimbabwe) Kevin Ullyett	(South Africa) Wayne Ferreira (Australia) Sandon Stolle	4–6, 7–6, 7–6
Win	10.	Nov 1999	Stockholm, Sweden	Hard (i)	(Zimbabwe) Kevin Ullyett	(United States) Jan-Michael Gambill (United States) Scott Humphries	7–5, 6–3
Loss	19.	Mar 2000	Santiago, Chile	Clay	(South Africa) Lan Bale	(Brazil) Gustavo Kuerten (Brazil) Antonio Prieto	2–6, 4–6
Win	11.	Apr 2000	Estoril, Portugal	Clay	(United States) Donald Johnson	(South Africa) David Adams (Australia) Joshua Eagle	6–4, 7–5
Win	12.	Jun 2000	Nottingham, UK	Grass	(United States) Donald Johnson	(South Africa) Ellis Ferreira (United States) Rick Leach	1–6, 6–4, 6–3
Loss	20.	Oct 2000	Toulouse, France	Hard (i)	(United States) Donald Johnson	(France) Julien Boutter (France) Fabrice Santoro	6–7, 6–4, 6–7
Win	13.	Oct 2000	Basel, Switzerland	Carpet	(United States) Donald Johnson	(Switzerland) Roger Federer (Slovakia) Dominik Hrbatý	7–6, 4–6, 7–6
Loss	21.	Nov 2000	Stuttgart, Germany	Hard (i)	(United States) Donald Johnson	(Czech Republic) Jiří Novák (Czech Republic) David Rikl	6–3, 3–6, 4–6
Win	14.	Dec 2000	Year-end championships, Bangalore, India	Hard	(United States) Donald Johnson	(India) Mahesh Bhupathi (India) Leander Paes	7–6, 6–3, 6–4

== Doubles performance timeline ==
Key
W	F	SF	QF	#R	RR	Q#	DNQ	A	NH

(W) winner; (F) finalist; (SF) semifinalist; (QF) quarterfinalist; (#R) rounds 4, 3, 2, 1; (RR) round-robin stage; (Q#) qualification round; (DNQ) did not qualify; (A) absent; (NH) not held; (SR) strike rate (events won / competed); (W–L) win–loss record.

Tournament	1986	1987	1988	1989	1990	1991	1992	1993	1994	1995	1996	1997	1998	1999	2000	2001	Career SR	Career win–loss
Grand Slam tournaments
Australian Open	NH	A	A	A	A	A	2R	3R	3R	1R	2R	QF	1R	1R	2R	1R	0 / 10	9–10
French Open	A	A	A	A	A	1R	3R	QF	1R	1R	1R	2R	1R	3R	3R	A	0 / 10	9–10
Wimbledon	A	A	A	A	3R	SF	1R	3R	1R	3R	1R	QF	3R	3R	2R	A	0 / 11	18–11
US Open	A	A	A	A	3R	2R	3R	2R	1R	1R	1R	1R	QF	1R	1R	A	0 / 11	9–10
Grand Slam SR	0 / 0	0 / 0	0 / 0	0 / 0	0 / 2	0 / 3	0 / 4	0 / 4	0 / 4	0 / 4	0 / 4	0 / 4	0 / 4	0 / 4	0 / 4	0 / 1	0 / 42	N/A
Annual win–loss	0–0	0–0	0–0	0–0	4–2	5–2	5–4	8–4	1–4	2–4	1–4	7–4	5–4	4–4	3–4	0–1	N/A	45–41
ATP Masters Series
Indian Wells	These Were Not ATP Masters Series Before 1990				A	1R	QF	A	A	F	A	2R	1R	A	1R	A	0 / 6	7–6
Miami	These Were Not ATP Masters Series Before 1990				A	W	SF	A	A	2R	A	SF	SF	2R	3R	A	1 / 7	16–6
Monte Carlo	These Were Not ATP Masters Series Before 1990				A	A	A	1R	2R	2R	2R	QF	1R	2R	1R	A	0 / 8	6–8
Rome	These Were Not ATP Masters Series Before 1990				A	A	A	1R	QF	1R	1R	1R	1R	1R	2R	A	0 / 8	3–8
Hamburg	These Were Not ATP Masters Series Before 1990				A	A	A	1R	W	1R	2R	F	QF	2R	2R	A	1 / 8	14–7
Montreal/Toronto	These Were Not ATP Masters Series Before 1990				A	A	A	A	A	A	2R	1R	A	2R	SF	A	0 / 4	5–4
Cincinnati	These Were Not ATP Masters Series Before 1990				A	QF	1R	1R	1R	2R	2R	2R	1R	1R	1R	A	0 / 10	5–10
Stuttgart (Stockholm)	These Were Not ATP Masters Series Before 1990				A	2R	2R	QF	2R	1R	1R	1R	1R	1R	F	A	0 / 10	7–10
Paris	These Were Not ATP Masters Series Before 1990				A	1R	QF	1R	2R	1R	A	SF	QF	1R	1R	A	0 / 9	8–9
Masters Series SR	N/A				0 / 0	1 / 5	0 / 5	0 / 6	1 / 6	0 / 8	0 / 6	0 / 9	0 / 8	0 / 8	0 / 9	0 / 0	2 / 70	N/A
Annual win–loss	N/A				0–0	8–4	8–5	2–6	9–5	6–8	4–6	14–9	7–8	3–8	10–9	0–0	N/A	71–68
Year-end ranking	870	336	334	503	89	19	39	36	18	43	37	28	29	25	23	1292	N/A	
