= Cyril Suk =

Czech tennis player and official

- Full name: Cyril Suk III
- Country (sports): Czechoslovakia (1988–92); Czech Republic (1993–2006)
- Residence: Bradenton, Florida, US
- Born: 29 January 1967 (age 59) Prague, Czechoslovakia (now Czech Republic)
- Height: 1.80 m (5 ft 11 in)
- Turned pro: 1988
- Retired: 2006
- Plays: Right-handed (two-handed backhand)
- Prize money: $3,651,530

Singles
- Career record: 1–17
- Career titles: 0
- Highest ranking: No. 180 (28 November 1988)

Grand Slam singles results
- Australian Open: 1R (1989, 1990)
- Wimbledon: Q3 (1991)

Doubles
- Career record: 618–529
- Career titles: 32
- Highest ranking: No. 7 (11 April 1994)

Grand Slam doubles results
- Australian Open: QF (1992, 1994)
- French Open: QF (1991, 2001, 2002)
- Wimbledon: QF (1994, 2002, 2003)
- US Open: W (1998)

Grand Slam mixed doubles results
- Australian Open: F (1995, 1998)
- French Open: W (1991)
- Wimbledon: W (1992, 1996, 1997)
- US Open: F (1995)

Cyril Suk III (born 29 January 1967) is a Czech former professional tennis player. A doubles specialist, Suk won five Grand Slam titles, one men's doubles and four Grand Slam mixed doubles titles and 32 ATP Tour doubles titles during his career. He reached a highest doubles ranking of world No. 7 in April 1994 and won 32 doubles titles.

== Early life ==
Suk was born in Prague, Czechoslovakia, a member of a prominent Czech tennis family. His mother, Vera, was a women's singles finalist at Wimbledon in 1962. His father, Cyril, was President of the Czechoslovak Tennis Federation. His sister, Helena, was an even more successful professional player on the women's tour who teamed-up with Suk to win three Grand Slam mixed doubles titles in the 1990s.

== Juniors ==
In 1985, Suk partnered with fellow Czech tennis player Petr Korda to win the boys' doubles title at the French Open. Suk and Korda were ranked the joint-World No. 1 junior doubles players that year.

== Career ==
Suk claimed his first Grand Slam mixed doubles title in 1991 at the French Open, partnering sister Helena. In 1992, he teamed up with Larisa Neiland to win the Wimbledon mixed doubles title. He went on to win the Wimbledon mixed doubles crown on two further occasions partnering Helena – in 1996 and 1997. In 1998, Suk teamed up with Sandon Stolle to win the US Open men's doubles title.

Suk's career-high doubles ranking was world No. 7 in 1994. (In singles, his career-high ranking was world No. 180 in 1988. He has largely focused on doubles play during his career.)

Suk was selected as captain of the Czech Republic's Davis Cup team for the 2003 season.

Suk married his wife Lenka in 1991. They have a son, Cyril IV (born 1992), who is a PGA Tour professional and a daughter, Natalie Mia (born 1996), who is also playing tennis, mostly on ITF Tour.

== Grand Slam finals ==
=== Doubles (1 title) ===
| Result | Year | Championship | Surface | Partner | Opponents | Score |
|---|---|---|---|---|---|---|
| Win | 1998 | U.S. Open | Hard | (Australia) Sandon Stolle | (The Bahamas) Mark Knowles (Canada) Daniel Nestor | 4–6, 7–6^{(10–8)}, 6–2 |

=== Mixed doubles: 8 (4 titles, 4 runners-up) ===
| Result | Year | Championship | Surface | Partner | Opponents | Score |
|---|---|---|---|---|---|---|
| Win | 1991 | French Open | Clay | (Czechoslovakia) Helena Suková | (Netherlands) Caroline Vis (Netherlands) Paul Haarhuis | 3–6, 6–4, 6–1 |
| Win | 1992 | Wimbledon | Grass | (Latvia) Larisa Neiland | (Netherlands) Miriam Oremans (Netherlands) Jacco Eltingh | 7–6^{(2)}, 6–2 |
| Loss | 1995 | Australian Open | Hard | (United States) Gigi Fernández | (Belarus) Natasha Zvereva (United States) Rick Leach | 6–7^{(4–7)}, 7–6^{(7–3)}, 4–6 |
| Loss | 1995 | Wimbledon | Grass | (United States) Gigi Fernández | (United States) Martina Navratilova (United States) Jonathan Stark | 4–6, 4–6 |
| Loss | 1995 | US Open | Hard | (United States) Gigi Fernández | (Australia) Meredith McGrath (United States) Matt Lucena | 4–6, 4–6 |
| Win | 1996 | Wimbledon | Grass | (Czechoslovakia) Helena Suková | (Latvia) Larisa Neiland (Australia) Mark Woodforde | 1–6, 6–3, 6–2 |
| Win | 1997 | Wimbledon | Grass | (Czechoslovakia) Helena Suková | (Latvia) Larisa Neiland (Russia) Andrei Olhovskiy | 4–6, 6–3, 6–4 |
| Loss | 1998 | Australian Open | Hard | (Czechoslovakia) Helena Suková | (United States) Venus Williams (United States) Justin Gimelstob | 2–6, 1–6 |

== Career finals ==
=== Doubles: 59 (32 titles / 27 runners-up) ===
| Legend Grand Slam (1) Tennis Masters Cup (0) ATP Masters Series (2) ATP International Series Gold (7) ATP Tour (22) | Titles by surface Hard (12) Clay (9) Grass (6) Carpet (5) |

| Result | W-L | Date | Tournament | Surface | Partner | Opponents | Score |
|---|---|---|---|---|---|---|---|
| Loss | 0–1 | Jul 1989 | Stuttgart Outdoor, Germany | Clay | (Romania) Florin Segărceanu | (Czechoslovakia) Petr Korda (Czechoslovakia) Tomáš Šmíd | 3–6, 4–6 |
| Win | 1–1 | Aug 1989 | St. Vincent, Italy | Clay | (Czechoslovakia) Josef Čihák | (Italy) Massimo Cierro (Italy) Alessandro de Minicis | 6–4, 6–2 |
| Loss | 1–2 | Feb 1991 | Milan, Italy | Carpet | (Netherlands) Tom Nijssen | (Italy) Omar Camporese (Croatia) Goran Ivanišević | 4–6, 6–7 |
| Loss | 1–3 | Apr 1991 | Estoril, Portugal | Clay | (Netherlands) Tom Nijssen | (Netherlands) Paul Haarhuis (Netherlands) Mark Koevermans | 3–6, 3–6 |
| Win | 2–3 | Aug 1991 | Prague, Czechoslovakia | Clay | (Czechoslovakia) Vojtěch Flégl | (Belgium) Libor Pimek (Czechoslovakia) Daniel Vacek | 6–4, 6–2 |
| Win | 3–3 | Oct 1991 | Toulouse, France | Hard (i) | (Netherlands) Tom Nijssen | (United Kingdom) Jeremy Bates (United States) Kevin Curren | 4–6, 6–3, 7–6 |
| Win | 4–3 | Oct 1991 | Lyon, France | Carpet | (Netherlands) Tom Nijssen | (United States) Steve DeVries (Australia) David Macpherson | 7–6, 6–3 |
| Loss | 4–4 | Oct 1991 | Stockholm, Sweden | Carpet | (Netherlands) Tom Nijssen | (Australia) John Fitzgerald (Sweden) Anders Järryd | 5–7, 2–6 |
| Win | 5–4 | Feb 1992 | Stuttgart Indoor, Germany | Carpet | (Netherlands) Tom Nijssen | (Australia) John Fitzgerald (Sweden) Anders Järryd | 6–3, 6–7, 6–3 |
| Loss | 5–5 | Jul 1992 | Gstaad, Switzerland | Clay | (Czechoslovakia) Petr Korda | (Netherlands) Hendrik Jan Davids (Belgium) Libor Pimek | W/O |
| Win | 6–5 | Oct 1992 | Basel, Switzerland | Hard (i) | (Netherlands) Tom Nijssen | (Czechoslovakia) Karel Nováček (Czechoslovakia) David Rikl | 6–3, 6–4 |
| Loss | 6–6 | Oct 1992 | Bolzano, Italy | Carpet | (Netherlands) Tom Nijssen | (Sweden) Anders Järryd (Norway) Bent-Ove Pedersen | 1–6, 7–6, 3–6 |
| Loss | 6–7 | Feb 1993 | Milan, Italy | Carpet | (Netherlands) Tom Nijssen | (Australia) Mark Kratzmann (Australia) Wally Masur | 6–4, 3–6, 4–6 |
| Win | 7–7 | Jun 1993 | Halle, Germany | Grass | (Czech Republic) Petr Korda | (United States) Mike Bauer (Germany) Marc-Kevin Goellner | 7–6, 5–7, 6–3 |
| Win | 8–7 | Jul 1993 | Stuttgart Outdoor, Germany | Clay | (Netherlands) Tom Nijssen | (South Africa) Gary Muller (South Africa) Piet Norval | 7–6, 6–3 |
| Win | 9–7 | Aug 1993 | New Haven, US | Hard | (Czech Republic) Daniel Vacek | (United States) Steve DeVries (Australia) David Macpherson | 6–3, 7–6 |
| Loss | 9–8 | Nov 1993 | Paris, France | Carpet | (Netherlands) Tom Nijssen | (Zimbabwe) Byron Black (United States) Jonathan Stark | 6–4, 5–7, 2–6 |
| Win | 10–8 | Jan 1994 | Oahu, US | Hard | (Netherlands) Tom Nijssen | (United States) Alex O'Brien (United States) Jonathan Stark | 6–4, 6–4 |
| Win | 11–8 | Feb 1994 | Milan, Italy | Carpet | (Netherlands) Tom Nijssen | (Netherlands) Hendrik Jan Davids (South Africa) Piet Norval | 4–6, 7–6, 7–6 |
| Loss | 11–9 | Feb 1995 | Stuttgart Indoor, Germany | Carpet | (Czech Republic) Daniel Vacek | (Canada) Grant Connell (United States) Patrick Galbraith | 2–6, 2–6 |
| Win | 12–9 | Apr 1995 | Nice, France | Clay | (Czech Republic) Daniel Vacek | (United States) Luke Jensen (United States) David Wheaton | 3–6, 7–6, 7–6 |
| Win | 13–9 | May 1995 | Rome, Italy | Clay | (Czech Republic) Daniel Vacek | (Sweden) Jan Apell (Sweden) Jonas Björkman | 6–3, 6–4 |
| Loss | 13–10 | Jul 1995 | Washington, D.C., US | Hard | (Czech Republic) Petr Korda | (France) Olivier Delaître (United States) Jeff Tarango | 6–1, 3–6, 2–6 |
| Win | 14–10 | Aug 1995 | Long Island, US | Hard | (Czech Republic) Daniel Vacek | (United States) Rick Leach (United States) Scott Melville | 5–7, 7–6, 7–6 |
| Loss | 14–11 | Sep 1995 | Bucharest, Romania | Clay | (Czech Republic) Daniel Vacek | (United States) Mark Keil (United States) Jeff Tarango | 4–6, 6–7 |
| Win | 15–11 | Oct 1995 | Basel, Switzerland | Hard (i) | (Czech Republic) Daniel Vacek | (United States) Mark Keil (Sweden) Peter Nyborg | 3–6, 6–3, 6–3 |
| Loss | 15–12 | Oct 1995 | Essen, Germany | Carpet | (Czech Republic) Daniel Vacek | (Netherlands) Jacco Eltingh (Netherlands) Paul Haarhuis | 5–7, 4–6 |
| Loss | 15–13 | Mar 1996 | Rotterdam, Netherlands | Carpet | (Netherlands) Hendrik Jan Davids | (South Africa) David Adams (South Africa) Marius Barnard | 3–6, 7–5, 6–7 |
| Loss | 15–14 | Aug 1996 | Cincinnati, US | Hard | (Australia) Sandon Stolle | (The Bahamas) Mark Knowles (Canada) Daniel Nestor | 6–3, 3–6, 4–6 |
| Loss | 15–15 | Aug 1996 | Indianapolis, US | Hard | (Czech Republic) Petr Korda | (United States) Jim Grabb (United States) Richey Reneberg | 6–7, 6–4, 4–6 |
| Win | 16–15 | Oct 1996 | Ostrava, Czech Republic | Carpet | (Australia) Sandon Stolle | (Slovakia) Ján Krošlák (Slovakia) Karol Kučera | 7–6, 6–3 |
| Loss | 16–16 | Feb 1997 | Dubai, UAE | Hard | (Australia) Sandon Stolle | (Netherlands) Sander Groen (Croatia) Goran Ivanišević | 6–7, 3–6 |
| Loss | 16–17 | Feb 1997 | Antwerp, Belgium | Hard (i) | (Australia) Sandon Stolle | (South Africa) David Adams (France) Olivier Delaître | 6–3, 2–6, 1–6 |
| Loss | 16–18 | Jun 1997 | London/Queen's Club, UK | Grass | (Australia) Sandon Stolle | (Australia) Mark Philippoussis (Australia) Patrick Rafter | 2–6, 6–4, 5–7 |
| Win | 17–18 | Nov 1997 | Moscow, Russia | Carpet | (Czech Republic) Martin Damm | (South Africa) David Adams (France) Fabrice Santoro | 6–4, 6–3 |
| Win | 18–18 | Mar 1998 | Scottsdale, US | Hard | (Australia) Michael Tebbutt | (United States) Kent Kinnear (United States) David Wheaton | 4–6, 6–1, 7–6 |
| Loss | 18–19 | Jul 1998 | Gstaad, Switzerland | Clay | (Argentina) Daniel Orsanic | (Brazil) Gustavo Kuerten (Brazil) Fernando Meligeni | 4–6, 5–7 |
| Win | 19–19 | Sep 1998 | U.S. Open, New York | Hard | (Australia) Sandon Stolle | (The Bahamas) Mark Knowles (Canada) Daniel Nestor | 4–6, 7–6, 6–2 |
| Win | 20–19 | Jul 1999 | Gstaad, Switzerland | Clay | (United States) Donald Johnson | (North Macedonia) Aleksandar Kitinov (United States) Eric Taino | 7–5, 7–6^{(7–4)} |
| Win | 21–19 | Jun 2000 | s’Hertogenbosch, Netherlands | Grass | (Czech Republic) Martin Damm | (Netherlands) Paul Haarhuis (Australia) Sandon Stolle | 6–4, 6–7^{(5–7)}, 7–6^{(7–5)} |
| Win | 22–19 | Jul 2000 | Kitzbühel, Austria | Clay | (Argentina) Pablo Albano | (Australia) Joshua Eagle (Australia) Andrew Florent | 6–3, 3–6, 6–3 |
| Loss | 22–20 | Jun 2001 | s'Hertogenbosch, Netherlands | Grass | (Czech Republic) Martin Damm | (Netherlands) Paul Haarhuis (Netherlands) Sjeng Schalken | 4–6, 4–6 |
| Loss | 22–21 | Jan 2002 | Auckland, New Zealand | Hard | (Argentina) Martín García | (Sweden) Jonas Björkman (Australia) Todd Woodbridge | 6–7^{(5–7)}, 6–7^{(7–9)} |
| Win | 23–21 | Mar 2002 | Delray Beach, US | Hard | (Czech Republic) Martin Damm | (South Africa) David Adams (Australia) Ben Ellwood | 6–4, 6–7^{(5–7)}, [10–5] |
| Win | 24–21 | May 2002 | Rome, Italy | Clay | (Czech Republic) Martin Damm | (Zimbabwe) Wayne Black (Zimbabwe) Kevin Ullyett | 7–5, 7–5 |
| Win | 25–21 | Jun 2002 | s’Hertogenbosch, Netherlands | Grass | (Czech Republic) Martin Damm | (Netherlands) Paul Haarhuis (United States) Brian MacPhie | 7–6^{(8–6)}, 6–7^{(6–8)}, 6–4 |
| Win | 26–21 | Jan 2003 | Doha, Qatar | Hard | (Czech Republic) Martin Damm | (The Bahamas) Mark Knowles (Canada) Daniel Nestor | 6–4, 7–6^{(10–8)} |
| Loss | 26–22 | Jun 2003 | Halle, Germany | Grass | (Czech Republic) Martin Damm | (Sweden) Jonas Björkman (Australia) Todd Woodbridge | 3–6, 4–6 |
| Win | 27–22 | Jun 2003 | s’Hertogenbosch, Netherlands | Grass | (Czech Republic) Martin Damm | (United States) Donald Johnson (India) Leander Paes | 7–5, 7–6^{(7–4)} |
| Win | 28–22 | Jul 2003 | Kitzbühel, Austria | Clay | (Czech Republic) Martin Damm | (Austria) Jürgen Melzer (Austria) Alexander Peya | 6–4, 6–4 |
| Loss | 28–23 | Aug 2003 | Long Island, US | Hard | (Czech Republic) Martin Damm | (South Africa) Robbie Koenig (Argentina) Martín Rodríguez | 3–6, 6–7 |
| Win | 29–23 | Jan 2004 | Doha, Qatar | Hard | (Czech Republic) Martin Damm | (Austria) Stefan Koubek (United States) Andy Roddick | 6–2, 6–4 |
| Loss | 29–24 | Feb 2004 | Marseille, France | Hard (i) | (Czech Republic) Martin Damm | (The Bahamas) Mark Knowles (Canada) Daniel Nestor | 5–7, 3–6 |
| Win | 30–24 | Jun 2004 | s’Hertogenbosch, Netherlands | Grass | (Czech Republic) Martin Damm | (Germany) Lars Burgsmüller (Czech Republic) Jan Vacek | 6–3, 7–6^{(7–9)}, 6–3 |
| Win | 31–24 | Oct 2004 | Vienna, Austria | Hard (i) | (Czech Republic) Martin Damm | (Argentina) Gastón Etlis (Argentina) Martín Rodríguez | 6–7^{(4–7)}, 6–4, 7–6^{(7–4)} |
| Loss | 31–25 | Feb 2005 | Rotterdam, Netherlands | Hard (i) | (Czech Republic) Pavel Vízner | (Israel) Jonathan Erlich (Israel) Andy Ram | 4–6, 6–4, 3–6 |
| Win | 32–25 | Jun 2005 | s’Hertogenbosch, Netherlands | Grass | (Czech Republic) Pavel Vízner | (Czech Republic) Tomáš Cibulec (Czech Republic) Leoš Friedl | 6–3, 6–4 |
| Loss | 32–26 | May 2006 | Pörtschach, Austria | Clay | (Austria) Oliver Marach | (Australia) Paul Hanley (United States) Jim Thomas | 3–6, 6–4, [5–10] |
| Loss | 32–27 | Jul 2006 | Kitzbühel, Austria | Clay | (Austria) Oliver Marach | (Germany) Philipp Kohlschreiber (Austria) Stefan Koubek | 2–6, 3–6 |

== Doubles performance timeline ==
Key
| W | F | SF | QF | #R | RR | Q# | DNQ | A | NH |

(W) winner; (F) finalist; (SF) semifinalist; (QF) quarterfinalist; (#R) rounds 4, 3, 2, 1; (RR) round-robin stage; (Q#) qualification round; (DNQ) did not qualify; (A) absent; (NH) not held; (SR) strike rate (events won / competed); (W–L) win–loss record.

| Tournament | 1986 | 1987 | 1988 | 1989 | 1990 | 1991 | 1992 | 1993 | 1994 | 1995 | 1996 | 1997 | 1998 | 1999 | 2000 | 2001 | 2002 | 2003 | 2004 | 2005 | 2006 | 2007 | Career SR | Career win–loss |
|---|---|---|---|---|---|---|---|---|---|---|---|---|---|---|---|---|---|---|---|---|---|---|---|---|
Grand Slam tournaments
| Australian Open | A | A | A | 1R | 2R | 2R | QF | 2R | QF | 2R | 3R | 2R | 3R | 1R | A | 1R | 1R | 3R | 2R | 2R | 3R | A | 0 / 17 | 21–17 |
| French Open | A | 2R | 2R | 2R | 2R | QF | 2R | 2R | 3R | 2R | 2R | 1R | 1R | 1R | 1R | QF | QF | 2R | 1R | 2R | 2R | 1R | 0 / 21 | 21–21 |
| Wimbledon | A | 1R | A | 2R | 1R | 3R | 1R | 2R | QF | 1R | 2R | 3R | 3R | 1R | 3R | 2R | QF | QF | 3R | 3R | 3R | 1R | 0 / 20 | 27–20 |
| US Open | A | A | A | A | 1R | 1R | 3R | 3R | QF | 2R | 1R | QF | W | 3R | 1R | 2R | 1R | QF | 3R | QF | 1R | 1R | 1 / 18 | 28–17 |
| Grand Slam SR | 0 / 0 | 0 / 2 | 0 / 1 | 0 / 3 | 0 / 4 | 0 / 4 | 0 / 4 | 0 / 4 | 0 / 4 | 0 / 4 | 0 / 4 | 0 / 4 | 1 / 4 | 0 / 4 | 0 / 3 | 0 / 4 | 0 / 4 | 0 / 4 | 0 / 4 | 0 / 4 | 0 / 4 | 0 / 3 | 1 / 76 | N/A |
| Annual win–loss | 0–0 | 1–2 | 1–1 | 2–3 | 2–4 | 6–4 | 6–4 | 5–4 | 11–4 | 3–4 | 4–4 | 6–4 | 10–3 | 2–4 | 2–3 | 4–4 | 6–4 | 9–4 | 5–4 | 7–4 | 5–4 | 0–3 | N/A | 97–75 |
ATP Masters Series
| Indian Wells | These Were Not ATP Masters Series Before 1990 | | | | A | A | 1R | A | A | A | A | 1R | QF | 1R | 1R | 1R | 1R | QF | QF | 2R | 1R | A | 0 / 11 | 6–11 |
| Miami | These Were Not ATP Masters Series Before 1990 | | | | A | 1R | 3R | 2R | 2R | 2R | 3R | 3R | QF | QF | 2R | 2R | 2R | QF | QF | 1R | QF | A | 0 / 16 | 14–16 |
| Monte Carlo | These Were Not ATP Masters Series Before 1990 | | | | 2R | 1R | SF | 1R | 1R | 1R | 1R | A | 1R | SF | 1R | 2R | QF | QF | SF | 2R | 1R | A | 0 / 16 | 12–16 |
| Rome | These Were Not ATP Masters Series Before 1990 | | | | QF | 1R | 1R | SF | 1R | W | 1R | SF | 2R | SF | A | SF | W | SF | 2R | 1R | 1R | A | 2 / 16 | 27–14 |
| Hamburg | These Were Not ATP Masters Series Before 1990 | | | | SF | QF | SF | 2R | QF | 1R | 1R | A | 2R | 2R | A | 1R | 2R | QF | 2R | 1R | 1R | A | 0 / 15 | 10–15 |
| Canada | These Were Not ATP Masters Series Before 1990 | | | | A | A | A | A | A | 2R | 2R | 2R | QF | 1R | 1R | 1R | 2R | SF | 2R | 2R | 1R | A | 0 / 12 | 9–10 |
| Cincinnati | These Were Not ATP Masters Series Before 1990 | | | | A | A | A | A | QF | 1R | F | QF | 2R | 2R | 1R | QF | SF | QF | 2R | 2R | 1R | A | 0 / 13 | 15–13 |
| Madrid (Stuttgart) | These Were Not ATP Masters Series Before 1990 | | | | 2R | F | QF | QF | 2R | F | 2R | 2R | 2R | 1R | A | 1R | QF | QF | SF | A | A | A | 0 / 14 | 15–14 |
| Paris | These Were Not ATP Masters Series Before 1990 | | | | A | 1R | QF | F | 2R | 2R | QF | 2R | QF | 1R | A | QF | 2R | 1R | QF | A | A | A | 0 / 13 | 13–13 |
| Masters Series SR | N/A | | | | 0 / 4 | 0 / 6 | 0 / 7 | 0 / 6 | 0 / 7 | 1 / 8 | 0 / 8 | 0 / 7 | 0 / 9 | 0 / 9 | 0 / 5 | 0 / 9 | 1 / 9 | 0 / 9 | 0 / 9 | 0 / 7 | 0 / 7 | 0 / 0 | 2 / 126 | N/A |
| Annual win–loss | N/A | | | | 7–4 | 5–6 | 8–7 | 8–6 | 3–7 | 8–7 | 9–8 | 8–6 | 9–9 | 10–9 | 1–5 | 9–9 | 13–8 | 10–8 | 8–9 | 3–7 | 2–7 | 0–0 | N/A | 121–122 |
| Year-end ranking | 153 | 108 | 88 | 88 | 75 | 18 | 17 | 9 | 24 | 8 | 32 | 23 | 11 | 41 | 58 | 35 | 14 | 16 | 16 | 26 | 37 | – | N/A | |
