= 2009 Maccabi Men's Challenger – Singles =

Singles
- 2009 Maccabi Men's Challenger

Final
- Champion: (Australia) Bernard Tomic
- Runner-up: (Australia) Marinko Matosevic
- Score: 5–7, 6–4, 6–3

Events
Singles	Doubles
← 2008 ·	Maccabi Men's Challenger	· 2010 →

Bernard Tomic won in the final of the first edition of these championships. He defeated his countryman Marinko Matosevic in three sets (5–7, 6–4, 6–3).

== Seeds ==
1. (Japan) Go Soeda (second round)
2. (Thailand) Danai Udomchoke (quarterfinals)
3. (Australia) Brydan Klein (semifinals)
4. (Australia) Colin Ebelthite (semifinals)
5. (Australia) Joseph Sirianni (first round)
6. (Australia) Marinko Matosevic (final)
7. (Australia) Nick Lindahl (quarterfinals)
8. (South Africa) Raven Klaasen (first round)

== Draw ==
=== Key ===
- Q = Qualifier
- WC = Wild card
- LL = Lucky loser
- Alt = Alternate
- SE = Special exempt
- PR = Protected ranking
- ITF = ITF entry
- JE = Junior exempt
- w/o = Walkover
- r = Retired
- d = Defaulted
- SR = Special ranking

=== Final four ===
Semifinals
WC	(Australia) Bernard Tomic	7	6
3	(Australia) Brydan Klein	6^{4}	3
4	(Australia) Colin Ebelthite	3	2
6	(Australia) Marinko Matosevic	6	6

Final
WC	(Australia) Bernard Tomic	5	6	6
6	(Australia) Marinko Matosevic	7	4	3

=== Top half ===
First round
1	(Japan) G Soeda	4	7	6
(Australia) A Coelho	6	6^{1}	3
(Japan) Junn Mitsuhashi	7	5	6
(New Zealand) J Statham	6^{2}	7	0
(Japan) T Matsui	2	4
WC	(Australia) M Reid	6	6
WC	(Australia) B Tomic	6	6
5	(Australia) J Sirianni	4	2
3	(Australia) B Klein	6	7
Q	(Australia) Joel Lindner	4	6^{4}
(Australia) R Junaid	3	2
(Australia) G Jones	6	6
(New Zealand) D King-Turner	6	4	6
(Finland) T Nieminen	2	6	3
(Slovakia) I Klec	4	6	6
8	(South Africa) R Klaasen	6	2	3

Second round
1	(Japan) G Soeda	3	6	4
(Japan) J Mitsuhashi	6	3	6
WC	(Australia) M Reid	6^{3}	1
WC	(Australia) B Tomic	7	6
3	(Australia) B Klein	4	6	6
(Australia) G Jones	6	4	2
(New Zealand) D King-Turner	6^{4}	6	6^{5}
(Slovakia) I Klec	7	4	7

Quarterfinals
(Japan) J Mitsuhashi	6	6^{5}	1
WC	(Australia) B Tomic	2	7	6
3	(Australia) B Klein	4	6	6
(Slovakia) I Klec	6	4	2

Semifinals
WC	(Australia) B Tomic	7	6
3	(Australia) B Klein	6^{4}	3

=== Bottom half ===
First round
7	(Australia) N Lindahl	6	3	6
(China) S-X Zheng	2	6	3
(China) M-X Gong	7	4	2
WC	(Australia) D Propoggia	6^{3}	6	6
(Chinese Taipei) T Chen	6	6
Q	(Germany) T Klein	4	4
(Australia) A Feeney	6^{4}	3
4	(Australia) C Ebelthite	7	6
6	(Australia) M Matosevic	6	6
(South Korea) H-W Nam	4	1
(Australia) M Ebden	7	6
WC	(Australia) Dayne Kelly	6^{5}	4
Q	(China) J-C Xu	4	5
Q	(Australia) S Kadir	6	7
(Australia) M Armstrong	2	0
2	(Thailand) D Udomchoke	6	6

Second round
7	(Australia) N Lindahl	6	6
WC	(Australia) D Propoggia	2	4
(Chinese Taipei) T Chen	2	1
4	(Australia) C Ebelthite	6	6
6	(Australia) M Matosevic	5	6	7
(Australia) M Ebden	7	1	6^{6}
Q	(Australia) S Kadir	3	5
2	(Thailand) D Udomchoke	6	7

Quarterfinals
7	(Australia) N Lindahl	4	2
4	(Australia) C Ebelthite	6	6
6	(Australia) M Matosevic	6	6
2	(Thailand) D Udomchoke	1	0

Semifinals
4	(Australia) C Ebelthite	3	2
6	(Australia) M Matosevic	6	6
