= 2005 Ordina Open – Women's doubles =

Women's doubles
- 2005 Ordina Open

Final
- Champions: (Spain) Anabel Medina Garrigues (Russia) Dinara Safina
- Runners-up: (Czech Republic) Iveta Benešová (Spain) Nuria Llagostera Vives
- Score: 6–4, 2–6, 7–6^{(13–11)}

Events
Singles	men	women
Doubles	men	women
← 2004 ·	Ordina Open	· 2006 →

Lisa McShea and Milagros Sequera were the defending champions, but Sequera did not compete this year. McShea teamed up with Claudine Schaul and lost in first round to tournament runners-up Iveta Benešová and Nuria Llagostera Vives.

Anabel Medina Garrigues and Dinara Safina won the title by defeating Iveta Benešová and Nuria Llagostera Vives 6–4, 2–6, 7–6^{(13–11)} in the final.

== Seeds ==
1. (Russia) Nadia Petrova / (United States) Meghann Shaughnessy (semifinals, withdrew due to a right adductor strain on Petrova)
2. (Germany) Anna-Lena Grönefeld / (United States) Martina Navratilova (semifinal)
3. (Spain) Anabel Medina Garrigues / (Russia) Dinara Safina (champions)
4. (Argentina) Gisela Dulko / (Russia) Maria Kirilenko (quarterfinals)

== Draw ==
=== Key ===
- Q = Qualifier
- WC = Wild card
- LL = Lucky loser
- Alt = Alternate
- SE = Special exempt
- PR = Protected ranking
- ITF = ITF entry
- JE = Junior exempt
- w/o = Walkover
- r = Retired
- d = Defaulted
- SR = Special ranking

=== Draw ===
First round
1	(Russia) N Petrova (United States) M Shaughnessy	6	2	6
(Slovenia) T Križan (United States) J Russell	3	6	0
(Belgium) L Butkiewicz (Netherlands) K Kilsdonk	1	6^{7}
(Czech Republic) D Chládková (Israel) S Pe'er	6	7^{9}
4	(Argentina) G Dulko (Russia) M Kirilenko	7^{7}	1	6
(Russia) A Jidkova (Australia) T Musgrave	6^{4}	6	4
(Czech Republic) I Benešová (Spain) N Llagostera Vives	6	7^{9}
(Australia) L McShea (Luxembourg) C Schaul	1	6^{7}
(Czech Republic) K Peschke (Germany) J Schruff	4	7^{7}	3
(Australia) B Sekulovski (Australia) C Watson	6	6^{0}	6
(Argentina) M Díaz Oliva (Netherlands) D van Boekel	1	5
3	(Spain) A Medina Garrigues (Russia) D Safina	6	7
(Poland) M Domachowska (Croatia) J Kostanić	3	4
(Russia) E Dementieva (Netherlands) M Krajicek	6	6
(Czech Republic) K Koukalová (Czech Republic) L Šafářová	7^{7}	4	3
2	(Germany) AL Grönefeld (United States) M Navratilova	6^{5}	6	6

Quarterfinals
1	(Russia) N Petrova (United States) M Shaughnessy	6	6
(Czech Republic) D Chládková (Israel) S Pe'er	2	1
4	(Argentina) G Dulko (Russia) M Kirilenko	3	3
(Czech Republic) I Benešová (Spain) N Llagostera Vives	6	6
(Australia) B Sekulovski (Australia) C Watson	2	1
3	(Spain) A Medina Garrigues (Russia) D Safina	6	6
(Russia) E Dementieva (Netherlands) M Krajicek
2	(Germany) AL Grönefeld (United States) M Navratilova	w/o

Semifinals
1	(Russia) N Petrova (United States) M Shaughnessy
(Czech Republic) I Benešová (Spain) N Llagostera Vives	w/o
3	(Spain) A Medina Garrigues (Russia) D Safina	6	6
2	(Germany) AL Grönefeld (United States) M Navratilova	4	3

Final
(Czech Republic) I Benešová (Spain) N Llagostera Vives	4	6	6^{11}
3	(Spain) A Medina Garrigues (Russia) D Safina	6	2	7^{13}
