= 2013 BNP Paribas Katowice Open =

- Date: April 8 – April 14
- Edition: 1st
- Category: WTA International tournaments
- Draw: 32S / 16D
- Prize money: $235,000
- Surface: Clay
- Location: Katowice, Poland
- Venue: Spodek

Champions

Singles
- (Italy) Roberta Vinci

Doubles
- (Spain) Lara Arruabarrena / (Spain) Lourdes Domínguez Lino
BNP Paribas Katowice Open	· 2014 →

The 2013 BNP Paribas Katowice Open was a women's tennis tournament played on indoor clay courts. It was the 1st edition of the BNP Paribas Katowice Open, in the International category of the 2013 WTA Tour. It took place at Spodek arena in Katowice, Poland, from April 8 through April 14, 2013.

== Singles main draw entrants ==
=== Seeds ===
Country	Player	Rank^{1}	Seed
CZE	Petra Kvitová	8	1
ITA	Roberta Vinci	13	2
CZE	Klára Zakopalová	21	3
GER	Julia Görges	30	4
FRA	Alizé Cornet	33	5
EST	Kaia Kanepi	38	6
GER	Sabine Lisicki	41	7
GBR	Laura Robson	42	8

- Rankings are as of April 1, 2013.

=== Other entrants ===
The following players received wildcards into the singles main draw:

- (Poland) Marta Domachowska
- (Czech Republic) Karolína Plíšková
- (Poland) Sandra Zaniewska

The following players received entry from the qualifying draw:

- (Romania) Alexandra Cadanțu
- (Italy) Maria Elena Camerin
- (United States) Jill Craybas
- (Slovakia) Anna Karolína Schmiedlová

The following player received entry as a lucky loser:

- (Israel) Shahar Pe'er

=== Withdrawals ===
Before the tournament

- (Czech Republic) Petra Cetkovská
- (Slovenia) Polona Hercog
- (Austria) Tamira Paszek
- (Slovakia) Magdaléna Rybáriková (low back injury)

=== Retirements ===
During the tournament

- (Germany) Julia Görges (dizziness)
- (Czech Republic) Andrea Hlaváčková (dizziness)

== Doubles main draw entrants ==
=== Seeds ===
Country	Player	Country	Player	Rank^{1}	Seed
GER	Anna-Lena Grönefeld	SVK	Janette Husárová	60	1
JPN	Shuko Aoyama	BIH	Mervana Jugić-Salkić	136	2
USA	Jill Craybas	LUX	Mandy Minella	137	3
CZE	Renata Voráčová	CZE	Klára Zakopalová	150	4

- Rankings are as of April 1, 2013.

=== Other entrants ===
The following pairs received wildcards into the doubles main draw:

- (Poland) Magdalena Fręch / (Poland) Katarzyna Pyka
- (Poland) Paula Kania / (Poland) Sandra Zaniewska

=== Withdrawals ===
Before the tournament

- (Uzbekistan) Akgul Amanmuradova (right elbow injury)
- (Poland) Magdalena Fręch (viral illness)

=== Retirements ===
During the tournament

- (Romania) Irina-Camelia Begu (right shoulder injury)

== Champions ==
=== Singles ===
- (Italy) Roberta Vinci def. (Czech Republic) Petra Kvitová, 7–6^{(7–2)}, 6–1

=== Doubles ===
- (Spain) Lara Arruabarrena / (Spain) Lourdes Domínguez Lino def. (Romania) Raluca Olaru / (Russia) Valeria Solovyeva, 6–4, 7–5
