= 2014 BNP Paribas Katowice Open – Singles =

Singles
- 2014 BNP Paribas Katowice Open

Final
- Champion: (France) Alizé Cornet
- Runner-up: (Italy) Camila Giorgi
- Score: 7–6^{(7–3)}, 5–7, 7–5

Events
| Singles | Doubles |
- BNP Paribas Katowice Open

Roberta Vinci was the defending champion, but lost to Camila Giorgi in the second round.

Alizé Cornet won the tournament, defeating Giorgi in the final, 7–6^{(7–3)}, 5–7, 7–5, despite being a championship match point down in the third set.

== Seeds ==
1. (Poland) Agnieszka Radwańska (semifinals)
2. (Italy) Roberta Vinci (second round)
3. (Spain) Carla Suárez Navarro (semifinals)
4. (France) Alizé Cornet (champion)
5. (Czech Republic) Klára Koukalová (quarterfinals)
6. (Austria) Yvonne Meusburger (quarterfinals)
7. (Slovakia) Magdaléna Rybáriková (quarterfinals)
8. (Bulgaria) Tsvetana Pironkova (second round)

== Main draw ==
Key

- Q = Qualifier
- WC = Wild card
- LL = Lucky loser
- Alt = Alternate
- ITF = ITF entry
- PR = Protected ranking
- SR = Special ranking
- SE = Special exempt
- JE = Junior exempt
- JR = Junior Accelerator Programme entrant
- CO = College Accelerator Programme entrant
- NG = Next Gen Accelerator Program entrant
- w/o = Walkover
- r = Retired
- d = Defaulted

=== Finals ===
Semifinals
1 | (Poland) Agnieszka Radwańska | 6 | 2 | 4
4/WC | (France) Alizé Cornet | 0 | 6 | 6
3 | (Spain) Carla Suárez Navarro | 6^{2} | 4
(Italy) Camila Giorgi | 7^{7} | 6

Final
4/WC | (France) Alizé Cornet | 7^{7} | 5 | 7
(Italy) Camila Giorgi | 6^{3} | 7 | 5

=== Top half ===
First round
1 | (Poland) A Radwańska | 6 | 6
WC | (Czech Republic) Kr Plíšková | 3 | 2
Q | (Russia) V Dushevina | 0 | 2
(Italy) F Schiavone | 6 | 6
(Croatia) M Lučić-Baroni | 6 | 6
SE | (Serbia) J Jakšić | 3 | 4
WC | (Poland) M Fręch | 3 | 1
6 | (Austria) Y Meusburger | 6 | 6
4/WC | (France) A Cornet | 6 | 6
(Serbia) V Dolonc | 3 | 2
Q | (Slovakia) K Kučová | 6 | 6
(Romania) M Niculescu | 1 | 1
(Germany) A Beck | 6 | 6
(Germany) M Barthel | 1 | 4
(Poland) M Linette | 4 | 3
5 | (Czech Republic) K Koukalová | 6 | 6

Second round
1 | (Poland) A Radwańska | 6 | 6
(Italy) F Schiavone | 4 | 3
(Croatia) M Lučić-Baroni | 2 | 3
6 | (Austria) Y Meusburger | 6 | 6
4/WC | (France) A Cornet | 6 | 4 | 6
Q | (Slovakia) K Kučová | 3 | 6 | 3
(Germany) A Beck | 6 | 3 | 1
5 | (Czech Republic) K Koukalová | 4 | 6 | 6

Quarterfinals
1 | (Poland) A Radwańska | 6 | 6
6 | (Austria) Y Meusburger | 4 | 1
4/WC | (France) A Cornet | 6 | 0 | 6
5 | (Czech Republic) K Koukalová | 2 | 6 | 2

Semifinals
1 | (Poland) A Radwańska | 6 | 2 | 4
4/WC | (France) A Cornet | 0 | 6 | 6

=== Bottom half ===
First round
7 | (Slovakia) M Rybáriková | 6 | 7
Q | (France) C Feuerstein | 2 | 5
(Japan) M Doi | 1 | 5
(Spain) S Soler Espinosa | 6 | 7
(Belgium) Y Wickmayer | 6 | 1 | 1
(Romania) A Cadanțu | 3 | 6 | 6
(Belgium) A Van Uytvanck | 4 | 0
3 | (Spain) C Suárez Navarro | 6 | 6
8 | (Bulgaria) T Pironkova | 4 | 7 | 6
(Czech Republic) A Hlaváčková | 6 | 5 | 1
(Israel) S Pe'er | 6 | 6
(Croatia) P Martić | 4 | 4
(Poland) K Piter | 0 | 1
(Italy) C Giorgi | 6 | 6
Q | (Russia) K Pervak | 3 | 3
2 | (Italy) R Vinci | 6 | 6

Second round
7 | (Slovakia) M Rybáriková | 6 | 6
(Spain) S Soler Espinosa | 2 | 0
(Romania) A Cadanțu | 6 | 4 | 4
3 | (Spain) C Suárez Navarro | 2 | 6 | 6
8 | (Bulgaria) T Pironkova | 2 | 1
(Israel) S Pe'er | 6 | 6
(Italy) C Giorgi | 6 | 6^{7} | 6
2 | (Italy) R Vinci | 3 | 7^{9} | 0

Quarterfinals
7 | (Slovakia) M Rybáriková | 2 | 3
3 | (Spain) C Suárez Navarro | 6 | 6
(Israel) S Pe'er | 1 | 4
(Italy) C Giorgi | 6 | 6

Semifinals
3 | (Spain) C Suárez Navarro | 6^{2} | 4
(Italy) C Giorgi | 7^{7} | 6

== Qualifying ==
=== Seeds ===
1. (France) Claire Feuerstein (qualified)
2. (Italy) Nastassja Burnett (first round)
3. (Russia) Vera Dushevina (qualified)
4. (Sweden) Sofia Arvidsson (second round)
5. (Slovakia) Kristína Kučová (qualified)
6. (Liechtenstein) Stephanie Vogt (first round)
7. (Netherlands) Arantxa Rus (second round)
8. (Serbia) Aleksandra Krunić (qualifying competition)

=== Qualifiers ===
1. (France) Claire Feuerstein
2. (Slovakia) Kristína Kučová
3. (Russia) Vera Dushevina
4. (Russia) Ksenia Pervak

=== Qualifying draw ===
==== First qualifier ====
First round
1 | (France) Claire Feuerstein | 6 | 6
WC | (Poland) Katarzyna Pyka | 2 | 3
(France) Julie Coin | 6 | 5 | 2
(Switzerland) Viktorija Golubic | 4 | 7 | 6
(Portugal) Maria João Koehler | 5 | 4
(Austria) Tamira Paszek | 7 | 6
(Italy) Alberta Brianti | 5 | 2
8 | (Serbia) Aleksandra Krunić | 7 | 6

Second round
1 | (France) Claire Feuerstein | 6 | 6
(Switzerland) Viktorija Golubic | 3 | 1
(Austria) Tamira Paszek | 2 | 2^{r}
8 | (Serbia) Aleksandra Krunić | 6 | 3

Qualifying competition
1 | (France) Claire Feuerstein | 6 | 6
8 | (Serbia) Aleksandra Krunić | 4 | 3

==== Second qualifier ====
First round
2 | (Italy) Nastassja Burnett | 1 | 6 | 1
(Japan) Eri Hozumi | 6 | 1 | 6
(Ukraine) Yuliya Beygelzimer | 6 | 6
(Ukraine) Olga Savchuk | 1 | 2
(Czech Republic) Renata Voráčová | 4 | 6 | 3
WC | (Czech Republic) Marie Bouzková | 6 | 2 | 6
(Ukraine) Kateryna Bondarenko | 1 | 3
5 | (Slovakia) Kristína Kučová | 6 | 6

Second round
(Japan) Eri Hozumi | 4 | 3
(Ukraine) Yuliya Beygelzimer | 6 | 6
WC | (Czech Republic) Marie Bouzková
5 | (Slovakia) Kristína Kučová | w/o

Qualifying competition
(Ukraine) Yuliya Beygelzimer | 3 | 7 | 4
5 | (Slovakia) Kristína Kučová | 6 | 5 | 6

==== Third qualifier ====
First round
3 | (Russia) Vera Dushevina | 6 | 6
(Croatia) Ana Vrljić | 1 | 4
(Latvia) Diāna Marcinkēviča | 6^{5} | 6^{8}
(Ukraine) Anastasiya Vasylyeva | 7^{7} | 7^{10}
(Italy) Maria Elena Camerin | 6 | 6
WC | (Poland) Marta Kowalska | 0 | 2
(Poland) Paula Kania | 6 | 6
6 | (Liechtenstein) Stephanie Vogt | 3 | 4

Second round
3 | (Russia) Vera Dushevina | 6 | 6
(Ukraine) Anastasiya Vasylyeva | 3 | 3
(Italy) Maria Elena Camerin | 6^{4} | 6 | 7
(Poland) Paula Kania | 7^{7} | 1 | 5

Qualifying competition
3 | (Russia) Vera Dushevina | 6 | 2 | 6
(Italy) Maria Elena Camerin | 1 | 6 | 1

==== Fourth qualifier ====
First round
4 | (Sweden) Sofia Arvidsson | 6 | 4 | 6
(Czech Republic) Kateřina Siniaková | 2 | 6 | 2
(Czech Republic) Eva Birnerová | 5 | 1
(Switzerland) Timea Bacsinszky | 7 | 6
WC | (Poland) Zuzanna Maciejewska | 4 | 3
(Russia) Ksenia Pervak | 6 | 6
(Germany) Carina Witthöft | 3 | 2
7 | (Netherlands) Arantxa Rus | 6 | 6

Second round
4 | (Sweden) Sofia Arvidsson | 2 | 3
(Switzerland) Timea Bacsinszky | 6 | 6
(Russia) Ksenia Pervak | 6 | 6
7 | (Netherlands) Arantxa Rus | 2 | 3

Qualifying competition
(Switzerland) Timea Bacsinszky | 5 | 7 | 4
(Russia) Ksenia Pervak | 7 | 5 | 6
