= 2014 BNP Paribas Katowice Open =

Women's tennis tournament

- Date: April 7–13
- Edition: 2nd
- Category: WTA International tournaments
- Draw: 32S / 16D
- Prize money: $250,000
- Surface: Hard
- Location: Katowice, Poland
- Venue: Spodek

Champions

Singles
- (France) Alizé Cornet

Doubles
- (Ukraine) Yuliya Beygelzimer / (Ukraine) Olga Savchuk
← 2013 ·	BNP Paribas Katowice Open	· 2015 →

The 2014 BNP Paribas Katowice Open is a women's tennis tournament played on indoor hard courts. It was the second edition of the BNP Paribas Katowice Open, in the International category of the 2014 WTA Tour. It took place at Spodek arena in Katowice, Poland, from April 7 through April 13, 2014.

== Points and prize money ==
=== Point distribution ===
Event	W	F	SF	QF	Round of 16	Round of 32	Q	Q3	Q2	Q1
Women's singles	280	180	110	60	30	1	18	14	10	1
Women's doubles	280	180	110	60	1	—	—	—	—	—

=== Prize money ===
Event	W	F	SF	QF	Round of 16	Round of 32	Round of 64	Q2	Q1
Women's singles	$43,000	$21,400	$11,300	$5,900	$3,310	$1,925	$1,005	$730	$530
Women's doubles	$12,300	$6,400	$3,435	$1,820	$960	—	—	—	—

== Singles main-draw entrants ==
=== Seeds ===
Country	Player	Rank^{1}	Seed
POL	Agnieszka Radwańska	3	1
ITA	Roberta Vinci	16	2
ESP	Carla Suárez Navarro	17	3
FRA	Alizé Cornet	23	4
CZE	Klára Koukalová	31	5
AUT	Yvonne Meusburger	37	6
SVK	Magdaléna Rybáriková	38	7
BUL	Tsvetana Pironkova	42	8

- ^{1} Rankings as of March 31, 2014.

=== Other entrants ===
The following players received wildcards into the main draw:

- (France) Alizé Cornet
- (Poland) Magdalena Fręch
- (Czech Republic) Kristýna Plíšková

The following players received entry as a special exempt into the singles main draw:

- (Serbia) Jovana Jakšić

The following players received entry from the qualifying draw:

- (Russia) Vera Dushevina
- (France) Claire Feuerstein
- (Slovakia) Kristína Kučová
- (Russia) Ksenia Pervak

=== Withdrawals ===
Before the tournament

- (Belgium) Kirsten Flipkens (ankle injury) → replaced by (Czech Republic) Andrea Hlaváčková
- (Slovenia) Polona Hercog → replaced by (Belgium) Alison Van Uytvanck
- (Spain) María Teresa Torró Flor → replaced by (Serbia) Vesna Dolonc

== WTA doubles main-draw entrants ==
=== Seeds ===
Country	Player	Country	Player	Rank^{1}	Seed
CZE	Klára Koukalová	ROU	Monica Niculescu	73	1
CRO	Darija Jurak	USA	Megan Moulton-Levy	99	2
AUT	Sandra Klemenschits	SLO	Andreja Klepač	119	3
JPN	Shuko Aoyama	CZE	Renata Voráčová	120	4

- ^{1} Rankings as of March 31, 2014.

=== Other entrants ===
The following pairs received wildcards into the main draw:

- (Poland) Magdalena Fręch / (Poland) Zuzanna Maciejewska
- (Poland) Klaudia Jans-Ignacik / (Romania) Raluca Olaru

The following pairs received entry as alternates:

- (Ukraine) Veronika Kapshay / (Serbia) Teodora Mirčić

=== Withdrawals ===
Before the tournament

- (Austria) Tamira Paszek (left rib injury)

== Champions ==
=== Singles ===
- (France) Alizé Cornet def. (Italy) Camila Giorgi, 7–6^{(7-3)}, 5–7, 7–5

=== Doubles ===
- (Ukraine) Yuliya Beygelzimer / (Ukraine) Olga Savchuk def. (Czech Republic) Klára Koukalová / (Romania) Monica Niculescu, 6–4, 5–7, [10–7]
