= 2013 BNP Paribas Katowice Open – Doubles =

Doubles
- 2013 BNP Paribas Katowice Open

Final
- Champions: (Spain) Lara Arruabarrena (Spain) Lourdes Domínguez Lino
- Runners-up: (Romania) Raluca Olaru (Russia) Valeria Solovyeva
- Score: 6–4, 7–5

Events
Singles	Doubles
BNP Paribas Katowice Open	· 2014 →

Lara Arruabarrena and Lourdes Domínguez Lino won the first edition of the tournament, defeating Raluca Olaru and Valeria Solovyeva in the final, 6–4, 7–5.

== Seeds ==
1. (Germany) Anna-Lena Grönefeld / (Slovakia) Janette Husárová (first round)
2. (Japan) Shuko Aoyama / (Bosnia and Herzegovina) Mervana Jugić-Salkić (quarterfinals)
3. (United States) Jill Craybas / (Luxembourg) Mandy Minella (first round)
4. (Czech Republic) Renata Voráčová / (Czech Republic) Klára Zakopalová (quarterfinals)

== Draw ==
=== Key ===
- Q = Qualifier
- WC = Wild card
- LL = Lucky loser
- Alt = Alternate
- SE = Special exempt
- PR = Protected ranking
- ITF = ITF entry
- JE = Junior exempt
- w/o = Walkover
- r = Retired
- d = Defaulted
- SR = Special ranking

First round
1	(Germany) A-L Grönefeld (Slovakia) J Husárová	6^{3}	6	[4]
(Czech Republic) Ka Plíšková (Czech Republic) Kr Plíšková	7^{7}	2	[10]
(Poland) M Linette (Poland) K Piter	4	1
(Romania) R Olaru (Russia) V Solovyeva	6	6
3	(United States) J Craybas (Luxembourg) M Minella	3	3
(Romania) I-C Begu (Italy) ME Camerin	6	6
WC	(Poland) M Fręch (Poland) K Pyka
(Poland) M Domachowska (Poland) A Rosolska	w/o
WC	(Poland) P Kania (Poland) S Zaniewska	6	3	[8]
(Czech Republic) E Birnerová (Ukraine) I Buryachok	1	6	[10]
(Romania) A Cadanțu (Austria) S Klemenschits	4	7	[4]
4	(Czech Republic) R Voráčová (Czech Republic) K Zakopalová	6	5	[10]
(Uzbekistan) A Amanmuradova (Serbia) V Dolonc
(Spain) L Arruabarrena (Spain) L Domínguez Lino	w/o
(Canada) G Dabrowski (Czech Republic) E Hrdinová	2	6	[5]
2	(Japan) S Aoyama (Bosnia and Herzegovina) M Jugić-Salkić	6	1	[10]

Quarterfinals
(Czech Republic) Ka Plíšková (Czech Republic) Kr Plíšková	6	2	[2]
(Romania) R Olaru (Russia) V Solovyeva	2	6	[10]
(Romania) I-C Begu (Italy) ME Camerin	6^{4}	0^{r}
(Poland) M Domachowska (Poland) A Rosolska	7	0
(Czech Republic) E Birnerová (Ukraine) I Buryachok	7^{7}	6
4	(Czech Republic) R Voráčová (Czech Republic) K Zakopalová	6^{5}	0
(Spain) L Arruabarrena (Spain) L Domínguez Lino	3	6	[10]
2	(Japan) S Aoyama (Bosnia and Herzegovina) M Jugić-Salkić	6	4	[8]

Semifinals
(Romania) R Olaru (Russia) V Solovyeva	6	6
(Poland) M Domachowska (Poland) A Rosolska	2	2
(Czech Republic) E Birnerová (Ukraine) I Buryachok	0	3
(Spain) L Arruabarrena (Spain) L Domínguez Lino	6	6

Final
(Romania) R Olaru (Russia) V Solovyeva	4	5
(Spain) L Arruabarrena (Spain) L Domínguez Lino	6	7
