= 2013 BNP Paribas Katowice Open – Singles =

Singles
- 2013 BNP Paribas Katowice Open

Final
- Champion: (Italy) Roberta Vinci
- Runner-up: (Czech Republic) Petra Kvitová
- Score: 7–6(2), 6–1

Events
Singles	Doubles
- BNP Paribas Katowice Open

Roberta Vinci won the first edition of the tournament, defeating Petra Kvitová in the final, 7–6(2), 6–1.

== Seeds ==
1. (Czech Republic) Petra Kvitová (final)
2. (Italy) Roberta Vinci (champion)
3. (Czech Republic) Klára Zakopalová (second round)
4. (Germany) Julia Görges (first round, retired because of dizziness)
5. (France) Alizé Cornet (first round)
6. (Estonia) Kaia Kanepi (second round)
7. (Germany) Sabine Lisicki (first round)
8. (United Kingdom) Laura Robson (first round)

== Draw ==
Key

- Q = Qualifier
- WC = Wild card
- LL = Lucky loser
- Alt = Alternate
- ITF = ITF entry
- PR = Protected ranking
- SR = Special ranking
- SE = Special exempt
- JE = Junior exempt
- JR = Junior Accelerator Programme entrant
- CO = College Accelerator Programme entrant
- NG = Next Gen Accelerator Program entrant
- w/o = Walkover
- r = Retired
- d = Defaulted

=== Finals ===
Semifinals
1	(Czech Republic) Petra Kvitová	6	6
Q	(Romania) Alexandra Cadanțu	0	4
(Germany) Annika Beck	1	0
2	(Italy) Roberta Vinci	6	6

Final
1	(Czech Republic) Petra Kvitová	6^{2}	1
2	(Italy) Roberta Vinci	7^{7}	6

=== Top half ===
First round
1	(Czech Republic) P Kvitová	6	6
(Japan) M Doi	4	4
(Serbia) V Dolonc	6	6^{4}	2
(Luxembourg) M Minella	3	7^{7}	6
(Ukraine) E Svitolina	7^{7}	3	2
(Croatia) P Martić	6^{2}	6	6
Q	(Slovakia) AK Schmiedlová	6	6
5	(France) A Cornet	3	0
4	(Germany) J Görges	7^{7}	3	1^{r}
Q	(United States) J Craybas	6^{5}	6	4
(Bulgaria) T Pironkova	7	6^{4}	6^{4}
LL	(Israel) S Pe'er	5	7^{7}	7^{7}
(Romania) I-C Begu	5	7^{7}	6
(France) M Johansson	7	6^{5}	1
Q	(Romania) A Cadanțu	7	6
7	(Germany) S Lisicki	5	2

Second round
1	(Czech Republic) P Kvitová	7	6
(Luxembourg) M Minella	5	2
(Croatia) P Martić	6	6
Q	(Slovakia) AK Schmiedlová	4	2
Q	(United States) J Craybas	1	3
LL	(Israel) S Pe'er	6	6
(Romania) I-C Begu	6	3	4
Q	(Romania) A Cadanțu	4	6	6

Quarterfinals
1	(Czech Republic) P Kvitová	6	6
(Croatia) P Martić	3	2
LL	(Israel) S Pe'er	7	3	3
Q	(Romania) A Cadanțu	5	6	6

Semifinals
1	(Czech Republic) P Kvitová	6	6
Q	(Romania) A Cadanțu	0	4

=== Bottom half ===
First round
8	(United Kingdom) L Robson	7	6^{7}	1
(Spain) L Domínguez Lino	5	7^{9}	6
(Germany) A Beck	6	7
WC	(Poland) M Domachowska	3	5
Q	(Italy) ME Camerin	7^{7}	6
(Slovakia) J Čepelová	6^{2}	3
(Czech Republic) Kr Plíšková	6^{2}	2
3	(Czech Republic) K Zakopalová	7^{7}	6
6	(Estonia) K Kanepi	6	6
WC	(Poland) S Zaniewska	1	1
(Spain) MT Torró Flor	1	6	0
WC	(Czech Republic) Ka Plíšková	6	3	6
(Spain) L Arruabarrena	1	1
(Netherlands) K Bertens	6	6
(Czech Republic) A Hlaváčková	2	0^{r}
2	(Italy) R Vinci	6	2

Second round
(Spain) L Domínguez Lino	7	3	2
(Germany) A Beck	5	6	6
Q	(Italy) ME Camerin	7	3	6
3	(Czech Republic) K Zakopalová	5	6	3
6	(Estonia) K Kanepi	5	3
WC	(Czech Republic) Ka Plíšková	7	6
(Netherlands) K Bertens	6	3	4
2	(Italy) R Vinci	2	6	6

Quarterfinals
(Germany) A Beck	7^{7}	6
Q	(Italy) ME Camerin	6^{1}	0
WC	(Czech Republic) Ka Plíšková	1	0
2	(Italy) R Vinci	6	6

Semifinals
(Germany) A Beck	1	0
2	(Italy) R Vinci	6	6

== Qualifying ==
=== Seeds ===
1. (Portugal) Maria João Koehler (second round)
2. (Romania) Alexandra Cadanțu (qualified)
3. (Israel) Shahar Pe'er (qualifying competition, lucky loser)
4. (Uzbekistan) Akgul Amanmuradova (second round, retired)
5. (Russia) Valeria Savinykh (first round)
6. (Slovenia) Tadeja Majerič (first round)
7. (Russia) Valeria Solovyeva (second round)
8. (United States) Chiara Scholl (first round)

=== Qualifiers ===
1. (Italy) Maria Elena Camerin
2. (Romania) Alexandra Cadanțu
3. (Slovakia) Anna Karolína Schmiedlová
4. (United States) Jill Craybas

=== Lucky losers ===
1. (Israel) Shahar Pe'er

=== Qualifying draw ===
==== First qualifier ====
First round
1	(Portugal) Maria João Koehler	6	6
(Bosnia and Herzegovina) Mervana Jugić-Salkić	3	2
(Poland) Katarzyna Piter	4	6	6
WC	(Czech Republic) Marie Bouzková	6	2	1
(Germany) Anna-Lena Friedsam	2	3
(Italy) Maria Elena Camerin	6	6
(Latvia) Diāna Marcinkēviča	6	6
6	(Slovenia) Tadeja Majerič	2	3

Second round
1	(Portugal) Maria João Koehler	5	3
(Poland) Katarzyna Piter	7	6
(Italy) Maria Elena Camerin	6	6
(Latvia) Diāna Marcinkēviča	4	4

Qualifying competition
(Poland) Katarzyna Piter	2	4
(Italy) Maria Elena Camerin	6	6

==== Second qualifier ====
First round
2	(Romania) Alexandra Cadanțu	7	6
(Ukraine) Yuliya Beygelzimer	5	2
WC	(Poland) Katarzyna Kawa	6	6
(Italy) Corinna Dentoni	3	0
WC	(Poland) Magdalena Fręch	0	3
(Romania) Raluca Olaru	6	6
(Belgium) Alison Van Uytvanck	5	3
7	(Russia) Valeria Solovyeva	7	6

Second round
2	(Romania) Alexandra Cadanțu	6	6
WC	(Poland) Katarzyna Kawa	2	3
(Romania) Raluca Olaru	7	6
7	(Russia) Valeria Solovyeva	5	4

Qualifying competition
2	(Romania) Alexandra Cadanțu	6	6
(Romania) Raluca Olaru	0	0

==== Third qualifier ====
First round
3	(Israel) Shahar Pe'er	7^{7}	1	7
(France) Aravane Rezaï	6^{3}	6	5
(Czech Republic) Renata Voráčová	6	6^{2}	0
WC	(Poland) Paula Kania	3	7^{7}	6
(Ukraine) Veronika Kapshay	6^{2}	4
(Slovakia) Anna Karolína Schmiedlová	7^{7}	6
(Czech Republic) Tereza Smitková	6	7
8	(United States) Chiara Scholl	1	5

Second round
3	(Israel) Shahar Pe'er	6	6
WC	(Poland) Paula Kania	3	3
(Slovakia) Anna Karolína Schmiedlová	6	6
(Czech Republic) Tereza Smitková	4	2

Qualifying competition
3	(Israel) Shahar Pe'er	4	1
(Slovakia) Anna Karolína Schmiedlová	6	6

==== Fourth qualifier ====
First round
4	(Uzbekistan) Akgul Amanmuradova	5	6	6
(Japan) Shuko Aoyama	7	3	1
(Ukraine) Irina Buryachok	6	6
WC	(Poland) Katarzyna Pyka	0	0
(Czech Republic) Sandra Záhlavová	3	3
(United States) Jill Craybas	6	6
(Poland) Magda Linette	2	6	6
5	(Russia) Valeria Savinykh	6	2	4

Second round
4	(Uzbekistan) Akgul Amanmuradova	3	0^{r}
(Ukraine) Irina Buryachok	6	0
(United States) Jill Craybas	6	6
(Poland) Magda Linette	4	0

Qualifying competition
(Ukraine) Irina Buryachok	3	2
(United States) Jill Craybas	6	6
