= 2004 Ordina Open =

- Date: 14–20 June
- Edition: 15th (men); 9th (women)
- Category: International Series (men); Tier III (women)
- Surface: Grass / outdoor
- Location: Rosmalen, 's-Hertogenbosch, Netherlands

Champions

Men's singles
- (France) Michaël Llodra

Women's singles
- (France) Mary Pierce

Men's doubles
- (Czech Republic) Martin Damm / (Czech Republic) Cyril Suk

Women's doubles
- (Australia) Lisa McShea / (Venezuela) Milagros Sequera
- Ordina Open

The 2004 Ordina Open was a tennis tournament played on grass courts in Rosmalen, 's-Hertogenbosch in the Netherlands that was part of the International Series of the 2004 ATP Tour and of Tier III of the 2004 WTA Tour. The tournament was held from 14 June until 20 June 2004. Michaël Llodra and Mary Pierce won the singles titles.

== Finals ==
=== Men's singles ===
(France) Michaël Llodra defeated (Argentina) Guillermo Coria 6–3, 6–4

=== Women's singles ===
(France) Mary Pierce defeated (Czechoslovakia) Klára Koukalová 7–6^{(8–6)}, 6–2

=== Men's doubles ===
(Czech Republic) Martin Damm / (Czech Republic) Cyril Suk defeated (Germany) Lars Burgsmüller / (Czechoslovakia) Jan Vacek 6–3, 6–7^{(7–9)}, 6–3

=== Women's doubles ===
(Australia) Lisa McShea / (Venezuela) Milagros Sequera defeated (Croatia) Jelena Kostanić / (Luxembourg) Claudine Schaul 7–6^{(7–3)}, 6–3
