= 2009 Maccabi Men's Challenger =

- Date: 23 February – 1 March
- Edition: 1st
- Surface: Hard
- Location: Melbourne, Australia

Champions

Singles
- (Australia) Bernard Tomic

Doubles
- (Thailand) Sanchai Ratiwatana / (Thailand) Sonchat Ratiwatana
Maccabi Men's Challenger	· 2010 →

The 2009 Maccabi Men's Challenger was a professional tennis tournament played on outdoor hard courts. It was part of the 2009 ATP Challenger Tour. It took place in Melbourne, Australia between 23 February and 1 March 2009.

== Singles main-draw entrants ==
=== Seeds ===
Country	Player	Rank	Seed
JPN	Go Soeda	107	1
THA	Danai Udomchoke	160	2
AUS	Brydan Klein	206	3
AUS	Colin Ebelthite	243	4
AUS	Joseph Sirianni	246	5
AUS	Marinko Matosevic	283	6
AUS	Nick Lindahl	312	7
RSA	Raven Klaasen	327	8

- Rankings are as of 16 February 2009.

=== Other entrants ===
The following players received wildcards into the singles main draw:

- (Australia) Dayne Kelly
- (Australia) Dane Propoggia
- (Australia) Matt Reid
- (Australia) Bernard Tomic

The following players received entry from the qualifying draw:

- (Australia) Sadik Kadir
- (Germany) Tobias Klein
- (Australia) Joel Lindner
- (China) Xu Junchao

== Champions ==
=== Men's singles ===
(Australia) Bernard Tomic def. (Australia) Marinko Matosevic, 5–7, 6–4, 6–3

=== Men's doubles ===
(Thailand) Sanchai Ratiwatana / (Thailand) Sonchat Ratiwatana def. (Chinese Taipei) Chen Ti / (Thailand) Danai Udomchoke, 7–6(5), 5–7, [10–7]
