= 2005 Ordina Open – Men's singles =

Men's singles
- 2005 Ordina Open

Final
- Champion: (Croatia) Mario Ančić
- Runner-up: (France) Michaël Llodra
- Score: 7–5, 6–4

Details
- Draw: 32 (4 Q / 3 WC )
- Seeds: 8

Events
Singles	men	women
Doubles	men	women
- Ordina Open

Michaël Llodra was the defending champion, but lost in the final this year.

Mario Ančić won the title, beating Llodra 7–5, 6–4 in the final.

== Seeds ==
1. (Spain) Tommy Robredo (second round)
2. (Argentina) Guillermo Coria (second round)
3. (Croatia) Mario Ančić (champion)
4. (Germany) ~~Tommy Haas~~ (withdrew because of a right thigh injury)
5. (Sweden) Robin Söderling (second round)
6. (Romania) Andrei Pavel (first round)
7. (Belgium) Christophe Rochus (first round)
8. (France) Paul-Henri Mathieu (second round)
9. (Italy) Davide Sanguinetti (quarterfinals)

== Draw ==
Key

- Q = Qualifier
- WC = Wild card
- LL = Lucky loser
- Alt = Alternate
- ITF = ITF entry
- PR = Protected ranking
- SR = Special ranking
- SE = Special exempt
- JE = Junior exempt
- JR = Junior Accelerator Programme entrant
- CO = College Accelerator Programme entrant
- NG = Next Gen Accelerator Program entrant
- w/o = Walkover
- r = Retired
- d = Defaulted

=== Finals ===
Semifinals
(France) Michaël Llodra	7^{7}	6^{5}	6
WC	(Australia) Mark Philippoussis	6^{2}	7^{7}	3
3	(Croatia) Mario Ančić	6	6
(Czech Republic) Jan Hernych	4	4

Final
(France) Michaël Llodra	5	4
3	(Croatia) Mario Ančić	7	6

=== Top half ===
First round
1	(Spain) T Robredo	6	6
(Luxembourg) G Müller	4	4
(Switzerland) S Wawrinka	6	5	3
(Germany) L Burgsmüller	2	7	6
Q	(Germany) D Gremelmayr	3	6	6^{2}
(France) M Llodra	6	3	7^{7}
(Czech Republic) J Vaněk	4	3
8	(France) P-H Mathieu	6	6
9	(Italy) D Sanguinetti	7^{7}	6
PR	(Slovakia) K Kučera	6^{1}	4
(Netherlands) S Schalken	7^{7}	6
(Germany) B Phau	6^{5}	1
(Spain) G García López	6	6
Q	(Germany) T Klein	0	2
WC	(Australia) M Philippoussis	6	7^{10}
7	(Belgium) C Rochus	3	6^{8}

Second round
1	(Spain) T Robredo	2	6^{5}
(Germany) L Burgsmüller	6	7^{7}
(France) M Llodra	6	4	6
8	(France) P-H Mathieu	4	6	3
9	(Italy) D Sanguinetti	7^{8}	6
(Netherlands) S Schalken	6^{6}	3
(Spain) G García López	6^{7}	6^{2}
WC	(Australia) M Philippoussis	7^{9}	7^{7}

Quarterfinals
(Germany) L Burgsmüller	2	7^{7}	3
(France) M Llodra	6	6^{4}	6
9	(Italy) D Sanguinetti	6^{2}	6^{0}
WC	(Australia) M Philippoussis	7^{7}	7^{7}

Semifinals
(France) M Llodra	7^{7}	6^{5}	6
WC	(Australia) M Philippoussis	6^{2}	7^{7}	3

=== Bottom half ===
First round
6	(Romania) A Pavel	2	6^{1}
(Sweden) J Björkman	6	7^{7}
Q	(Germany) P Petzschner	4	3
(France) J Benneteau	6	6
(Australia) W Arthurs	7	6
(Netherlands) R Sluiter	5	4
Q	(Netherlands) P Logtens	4	2
3	(Croatia) M Ančić	6	6
5	(Sweden) R Söderling	7	6
(France) J Haehnel	5	3
(France) J-R Lisnard	1	6^{4}
(Germany) P Kohlschreiber	6	7^{7}
(Czech Republic) J Hernych	7^{9}	6
WC	(Netherlands) D van Scheppingen	6^{7}	4
LL	(Germany) L Uebel	3	1
WC/2	(Argentina) G Coria	6	6

Second round
(Sweden) J Björkman	6	6
(France) J Benneteau	4	2
(Australia) W Arthurs	4	6^{1}
3	(Croatia) M Ančić	6	7^{7}
5	(Sweden) R Söderling	4	6	6^{9}
(Germany) P Kohlschreiber	6	4	7^{11}
(Czech Republic) J Hernych	6	6
WC/2	(Argentina) G Coria	3	4

Quarterfinals
(Sweden) J Björkman	1	6	3
3	(Croatia) M Ančić	6	3	6
(Germany) P Kohlschreiber	6^{1}	2
(Czech Republic) J Hernych	7^{7}	6

Semifinals
3	(Croatia) M Ančić	6	6
(Czech Republic) J Hernych	4	4
