= 2004 Ordina Open – Women's doubles =

Women's doubles
- 2004 Ordina Open

Final
- Champion: (Australia) Lisa McShea (Venezuela) Milagros Sequera
- Runner-up: (Croatia) Jelena Kostanić (Luxembourg) Claudine Schaul
- Score: 7–6^{(7–3)}, 6–3

Events
Singles	men	women
Doubles	men	women
← 2003 ·	Rosmalen Grass Court Championships	· 2005 →

Elena Dementieva and Lina Krasnoroutskaia were the defending champions, but Dementieva chose not to take part in 2004. Krasnoroutskaia paired up with Anca Barna, but lost in the first round.

Lisa McShea and Milagros Sequera won the title in 2004.

== Results ==
=== Seeds ===
1. (Austria) Barbara Schett / (Switzerland) Patty Schnyder (semifinals)
2. (Australia) Lisa McShea / (Venezuela) Milagros Sequera (champions)
3. (Slovenia) Tina Krizan / (Slovenia) Katarina Srebotnik (first round)
4. (France) Caroline Dhenin / (United States) Jennifer Russell (quarterfinals)

=== Key ===
- Q = Qualifier
- WC = Wild card
- LL = Lucky loser
- Alt = Alternate
- SE = Special exempt
- PR = Protected ranking
- ITF = ITF entry
- JE = Junior exempt
- w/o = Walkover
- r = Retired
- d = Defaulted
- SR = Special ranking

=== Draw ===
First round
(Russia) G Fokina (Australia) K van Elden	7	7
(Argentina) G Dulko (Russia) M Kirilenko	6^{2}	5
4	(France) C Dhenin (United States) J Russell	7	6
(Italy) ME Camerin (Spain) M Marrero	6^{2}	3
(Germany) An Barna (Russia) L Krasnoroutskaia	2	6^{5}
(Croatia) J Kostanić (Luxembourg) C Schaul	6	7
(Belgium) L Butkiewicz (Netherlands) K Kilsdonk	5	5
(Slovakia) Ľ Cervanová (Czech Republic) K Koukalová	7	7
(Serbia and Montenegro) J Janković (Luxembourg) A Kremer	7	6
3	(Slovenia) T Krizan (Slovenia) K Srebotnik	6^{4}	4
(Czech Republic) D Chládková (Spain) A Parra Santonja	3	6	5
WC	(United States) C Gullickson (Netherlands) M Krajicek	6	4	7

Quarterfinals
1	(Austria) B Schett (Switzerland) P Schnyder	6	6^{2}	6
(Russia) G Fokina (Australia) K van Elden	2	7	3
4	(France) C Dhenin (United States) J Russell	7	3	4
(Croatia) J Kostanić (Luxembourg) C Schaul	6^{6}	6	6
(Slovakia) Ľ Cervanová (Czech Republic) K Koukalová	2	0
(Serbia and Montenegro) J Janković (Luxembourg) A Kremer	6	6
WC	(United States) C Gullickson (Netherlands) M Krajicek	3	4
2	(Australia) L McShea (Venezuela) M Sequera	6	6

Semifinals
1	(Austria) B Schett (Switzerland) P Schnyder	4	3
(Croatia) J Kostanić (Luxembourg) C Schaul	6	6
(Serbia and Montenegro) J Janković (Luxembourg) A Kremer	5	7	2
2	(Australia) L McShea (Venezuela) M Sequera	7	5	6

Final
(Croatia) J Kostanić (Luxembourg) C Schaul	6^{3}	3
2	(Australia) L McShea (Venezuela) M Sequera	7	6
