= 2009 Maccabi Men's Challenger – Doubles =

Doubles
- 2009 Maccabi Men's Challenger

Final
- Champions: (Thailand) Sanchai Ratiwatana (Thailand) Sonchat Ratiwatana
- Runners-up: (Chinese Taipei) Chen Ti (Thailand) Danai Udomchoke
- Score: 7–6^{(7–5)}, 5–7, [10–7]

Events
Singles	Doubles
- Maccabi Men's Challenger

This was the first edition of the tournament.

Sanchai and Sonchat Ratiwatana won the title after defeating Chen Ti and Danai Udomchoke 7–6^{(7–5)}, 5–7, [10–7] in the final.

== Seeds ==
1. (Thailand) Sanchai Ratiwatana / (Thailand) Sonchat Ratiwatana (champions)
2. (Australia) Andrew Coelho / (United States) Joseph Sirianni (semifinals)
3. (Australia) Matthew Ebden / (Australia) Adam Feeney (first round)
4. (Chinese Taipei) Chen Ti / (Thailand) Danai Udomchoke (final)

== Draw ==
Key

- Q = Qualifier
- WC = Wild card
- LL = Lucky loser
- Alt = Alternate
- ITF = ITF entry
- PR = Protected ranking
- SR = Special ranking
- SE = Special exempt
- JE = Junior exempt
- JR = Junior Accelerator Programme entrant
- CO = College Accelerator Programme entrant
- NG = Next Gen Accelerator Program entrant
- w/o = Walkover
- r = Retired
- d = Defaulted

First round
1	(Thailand) Sa Ratiwatana (Thailand) So Ratiwatana	6	6
(New Zealand) M Statham (China) X Yu	2	3
WC	(Australia) Marvin Barker (Australia) Stephen Hoh	3	2
(South Africa) R Klaasen (Slovakia) I Klec	6	6
3	(Australia) M Eden (Australia) A Feeney	6	3	[5]
(Australia) C Ebelthite (Australia) R Junaid	1	6	[10]
WC	(Australia) Joel Lindner (Australia) Andrew Thomas	6	4	[8]
(New Zealand) GD Jones (New Zealand) D King-Turner	4	6	[10]
(Japan) T Matsui (Japan) G Soeda	6	6
WC	(Australia) D Kelly (Australia) D Propoggia	3	3
(Australia) N Lindahl (Australia) M Matosevic	7	3	[4]
4	(Chinese Taipei) T Chen (Thailand) D Udomchoke	5	6	[10]
(Australia) M Armstrong (Australia) S Kadir	1	6	[10]
(Finland) T Nieminen (New Zealand) J Statham	6	3	[6]
(China) M Gong (China) S Zeng	6	3	[3]
2	(Australia) A Coelho (Australia) J Sirianni	4	6	[10]

Quarterfinals
1	(Thailand) Sa Ratiwatana (Thailand) So Ratiwatana	6	6
(South Africa) R Klaasen (Slovakia) I Klec	4	2
(Australia) C Ebelthite (Australia) R Junaid	6	2	[10]
(New Zealand) GD Jones (New Zealand) D King-Turner	4	6	[8]
(Japan) T Matsui (Japan) G Soeda	4	1
4	(Chinese Taipei) T Chen (Thailand) D Udomchoke	6	6
(Australia) M Armstrong (Australia) S Kadir	6^{2}	4
2	(Australia) A Coelho (Australia) J Sirianni	7^{7}	6

Semifinals
1	(Thailand) Sa Ratiwatana (Thailand) So Ratiwatana	6	7
(Australia) C Ebelthite (Australia) R Junaid	2	5
4	(Chinese Taipei) T Chen (Thailand) D Udomchoke	1	6	[10]
2	(Australia) A Coelho (Australia) J Sirianni	6	3	[8]

Final
1	(Thailand) Sa Ratiwatana (Thailand) So Ratiwatana	7^{7}	5	[10]
4	(Chinese Taipei) T Chen (Thailand) D Udomchoke	6^{5}	7	[7]
