= 2014 BNP Paribas Katowice Open – Doubles =

Women's tennis tournament

Doubles
- 2014 BNP Paribas Katowice Open

Final
- Champions: (Ukraine) Yuliya Beygelzimer (Ukraine) Olga Savchuk
- Runners-up: (Czech Republic) Klára Koukalová (Romania) Monica Niculescu
- Score: 6–4, 5–7, [10–7]

Events
Singles	Doubles
← 2013 ·	BNP Paribas Katowice Open	· 2015 →

Lara Arruabarrena and Lourdes Domínguez Lino were the defending champions, but they decided not to participate this year.
Yuliya Beygelzimer and Olga Savchuk won the title, defeating first-seeded Klára Koukalová and Monica Niculescu in the final, 6–4, 5–7, [10–7].

== Seeds ==
1. (Czech Republic) Klára Koukalová / (Romania) Monica Niculescu (final)
2. (Croatia) Darija Jurak / (United States) Megan Moulton-Levy (first round)
3. (Austria) Sandra Klemenschits / (Slovenia) Andreja Klepač (first round)
4. (Japan) Shuko Aoyama / (Czech Republic) Renata Voráčová (quarterfinals)

== Draw ==
=== Key ===
- Q = Qualifier
- WC = Wild card
- LL = Lucky loser
- Alt = Alternate
- SE = Special exempt
- PR = Protected ranking
- ITF = ITF entry
- JE = Junior exempt
- w/o = Walkover
- r = Retired
- d = Defaulted
- SR = Special ranking

First round
1	(Czech Republic) K Koukalová (Romania) M Niculescu	5	6	[10]
(Israel) S Pe'er (Spain) S Soler Espinosa	7	2	[8]
(France) L Thorpe (Liechtenstein) S Vogt	4	6	[13]
(Japan) M Doi (Japan) E Hozumi	6	4	[11]
3	(Austria) S Klemenschits (Slovenia) A Klepač	3	6	[3]
(Poland) P Kania (Russia) V Solovyeva	6	1	[10]
(Poland) K Piter (Poland) A Rosolska	6	6
Alt	(Ukraine) V Kapshay (Serbia) T Mirčić	2	4
(Germany) K Barrois (Ukraine) I Buryachok	3	6^{5}
(Ukraine) Y Beygelzimer (Ukraine) O Savchuk	6	7^{7}
WC	(Poland) M Fręch (Poland) Z Maciejewska	1	3
4	(Japan) S Aoyama (Czech Republic) R Voráčová	6	6
(Germany) M Barthel (Croatia) P Martić	4	6^{5}
(Czech Republic) E Hrdinová (Czech Republic) Kr Plíšková	6	7
WC	(Poland) K Jans-Ignacik (Romania) R Olaru	6	6
2	(Croatia) D Jurak (United States) M Moulton-Levy	4	3

Quarterfinals
1	(Czech Republic) K Koukalová (Romania) M Niculescu	6	6
(France) L Thorpe (Liechtenstein) S Vogt	2	1
(Poland) P Kania (Russia) V Solovyeva	2	7	[10]
(Poland) K Piter (Poland) A Rosolska	6	5	[8]
(Ukraine) Y Beygelzimer (Ukraine) O Savchuk	6	6
4	(Japan) S Aoyama (Czech Republic) R Voráčová	4	2
(Czech Republic) E Hrdinová (Czech Republic) Kr Plíšková	6	3	[6]
WC	(Poland) K Jans-Ignacik (Romania) R Olaru	3	6	[10]

Semifinals
1	(Czech Republic) K Koukalová (Romania) M Niculescu	6	6
(Poland) P Kania (Russia) V Solovyeva	2	3
(Ukraine) Y Beygelzimer (Ukraine) O Savchuk	6	2	[12]
WC	(Poland) K Jans-Ignacik (Romania) R Olaru	1	6	[10]

Final
1	(Czech Republic) K Koukalová (Romania) M Niculescu	4	7	[7]
(Ukraine) Y Beygelzimer (Ukraine) O Savchuk	6	5	[10]
