= 2005 Ordina Open – Men's doubles =

Men's doubles
- 2005 Ordina Open

Final
- Champions: (Czech Republic) Cyril Suk (Czech Republic) Pavel Vízner
- Runners-up: (Czech Republic) Tomáš Cibulec (Czech Republic) Leoš Friedl
- Score: 6–3, 6–4

Details
- Draw: 16
- Seeds: 4

Events
Singles	men	women
Doubles	men	women
- Ordina Open

Martin Damm and Cyril Suk were the defending champions, but competed this year with different partners.

Damm teamed up with Mariano Hood and lost in quarterfinals to Davide Sanguinetti and Rogier Wassen.

Suk teamed up with Pavel Vízner and successfully defended his title, by defeating Tomáš Cibulec and Leoš Friedl 6–3, 6–4 in the final.

== Seeds ==
1. (Czech Republic) Martin Damm / (Argentina) Mariano Hood (quarterfinals)
2. (Czech Republic) Cyril Suk / (Czech Republic) Pavel Vízner (champions)
3. (Switzerland) Yves Allegro / (France) Michaël Llodra (first round)
4. (Argentina) Gastón Etlis / (Argentina) Martín Rodríguez (first round)

== Draw ==
Key

- Q = Qualifier
- WC = Wild card
- LL = Lucky loser
- Alt = Alternate
- ITF = ITF entry
- PR = Protected ranking
- SR = Special ranking
- SE = Special exempt
- JE = Junior exempt
- JR = Junior Accelerator Programme entrant
- CO = College Accelerator Programme entrant
- NG = Next Gen Accelerator Program entrant
- w/o = Walkover
- r = Retired
- d = Defaulted

=== Draw ===
First round
1	(Czech Republic) M Damm (Argentina) M Hood	7^{7}	6
(France) J Benneteau (France) PH Mathieu	6^{2}	4
(Italy) D Sanguinetti (Netherlands) R Wassen	6	6
WC	(Netherlands) R Sluiter (Netherlands) D van Scheppingen	4	3
3	(Switzerland) Y Allegro (France) M Llodra	7^{7}	3	6^{4}
(Australia) J Kerr (United States) J Thomas	6^{4}	6	7^{7}
(Czech Republic) T Cibulec (Czech Republic) L Friedl	6	6
(Romania) A Pavel (Romania) G Trifu	4	4
(South Africa) R Koenig (Germany) M Kohlmann	6	6^{1}	4
(Argentina) G Coria (Argentina) M García	1	7^{7}	6
(Luxembourg) G Müller (Belgium) C Rochus	6	6
4	(Argentina) G Etlis (Argentina) M Rodríguez	3	4
(Spain) G García-López (Spain) T Robredo	6	7
WC	(Netherlands) T de Bakker (Netherlands) A van der Duim	2	5
(United States) R Leach (United States) T Parrott	6^{4}	6^{4}
2	(Czech Republic) C Suk (Czech Republic) P Vízner	7^{7}	7^{7}

Quarterfinals
1	(Czech Republic) M Damm (Argentina) M Hood	5	6^{5}
(Italy) D Sanguinetti (Netherlands) R Wassen	7	7^{7}
(Australia) J Kerr (United States) J Thomas	4	6	6^{2}
(Czech Republic) T Cibulec (Czech Republic) L Friedl	6	3	7^{7}
(Argentina) G Coria (Argentina) M García	7	6
(Luxembourg) G Müller (Belgium) C Rochus	5	3
(Spain) G García-López (Spain) T Robredo	6^{2}	4
2	(Czech Republic) C Suk (Czech Republic) P Vízner	7^{7}	6

Semifinals
(Italy) D Sanguinetti (Netherlands) R Wassen	3	3
(Czech Republic) T Cibulec (Czech Republic) L Friedl	6	6
(Argentina) G Coria (Argentina) M García	6^{6}	4
2	(Czech Republic) C Suk (Czech Republic) P Vízner	7^{8}	6

Final
(Czech Republic) T Cibulec (Czech Republic) L Friedl	3	4
2	(Czech Republic) C Suk (Czech Republic) P Vízner	6	6
