= 2004 Ordina Open – Women's singles =

Women's singles
- 2004 Ordina Open

Final
- Champion: (France) Mary Pierce
- Runner-up: (Czech Republic) Klára Koukalová
- Score: 7–6^{(8–6)}, 6–2

Events
| Singles | men | women |
| Doubles | men | women |
| ← 2003 · | Rosmalen Grass Court Championships | · 2005 → |

Kim Clijsters was the defending champion, but did not compete in 2004.

Mary Pierce won the title in 2004.

== Seeds ==
The top two seeds receive a bye into the second round.

1. (Russia) Nadia Petrova (second round)
2. (Switzerland) Patty Schnyder (second round)
3. (France) Mary Pierce (Winner)
4. (Greece) Eleni Daniilidou (first round, withdrew due to a right achilles strain)
5. (France) Émilie Loit (first round, withdrew due to a right foot ligament strain)
6. (Croatia) Jelena Kostanić (first round)
7. (Luxembourg) Claudine Schaul (quarterfinals)
8. (Russia) Lina Krasnoroutskaia (semifinals)

== Draw ==
=== Key ===
- Q = Qualifier
- WC = Wild card
- LL = Lucky loser
- Alt = Alternate
- SE = Special exempt
- PR = Protected ranking
- ITF = ITF entry
- JE = Junior exempt
- w/o = Walkover
- r = Retired
- d = Defaulted
- SR = Special ranking

=== Finals ===
Semifinals
8 | (Russia) Lina Krasnoroutskaia | 2 | 2
3 | (France) Mary Pierce | 6 | 6
(Czech Republic) Klára Koukalová | 7 | 3
(Spain) Anabel Medina Garrigues | 5 | 0^{r}

Final
3 | (France) Mary Pierce | 7 | 6
(Czech Republic) Klára Koukalová | 6^{6} | 2

=== Top half ===
First round
(Serbia and Montenegro) J Janković | 6 | 6
(Argentina) G Dulko | 1 | 1
(Czech Republic) D Chládková | 4 | 6 | 6
(Slovakia) M Suchá | 6 | 2 | 4
(Hungary) M Czink | 2 | 1
8 | (Russia) L Krasnoroutskaia | 6 | 6
3 | (France) M Pierce | 6 | 6
(Switzerland) E Gagliardi | 2 | 4
(Russia) M Kirilenko | 6 | 6
(Italy) ME Camerin | 4 | 1
(Slovenia) K Srebotnik | 1 | 3
PR | (Luxembourg) A Kremer | 6 | 6
(Germany) A Barna | 6 | 3 | 6
6 | (Croatia) J Kostanić | 4 | 6 | 2

Second round
1 | (Russia) N Petrova | 4 | 3
(Serbia and Montenegro) J Janković | 6 | 6
(Czech Republic) D Chládková | 3 | 4
8 | (Russia) L Krasnoroutskaia | 6 | 6
3 | (France) M Pierce | 6^{3} | 6 | 6
(Russia) M Kirilenko | 7 | 4 | 2
PR | (Luxembourg) A Kremer | 6 | 6
(Germany) A Barna | 2 | 4

Quarterfinals
(Serbia and Montenegro) J Janković | 4 | 1
8 | (Russia) L Krasnoroutskaia | 6 | 6
3 | (France) M Pierce | 6 | 6
PR | (Luxembourg) A Kremer | 4 | 2

Semifinals
8 | (Russia) L Krasnoroutskaia | 2 | 2
3 | (France) M Pierce | 6 | 6

=== Bottom half ===
First round
5 | (France) É Loit
(Austria) B Schett | w/o
(Italy) F Pennetta | 6 | 7
(Spain) A Parra Santonja | 3 | 6^{5}
(Spain) M Marrero | 7 | 5 | 3
(Venezuela) M Sequera | 6^{3} | 7 | 6
(Czech Republic) K Koukalová | w/o
4 | (Greece) E Daniilidou
7 | (Luxembourg) C Schaul | 6 | 3
WC | (Netherlands) M Krajicek | 4 | 1^{r}
WC | (United States) C Gullickson | 1 | 5
(Japan) A Morigami | 6 | 7
(Slovakia) Ľ Cervanová | 2 | 1
(Spain) A Medina Garrigues | 6 | 6

Second round
(Austria) B Schett | 7 | 6
(Italy) F Pennetta | 5 | 2
(Venezuela) M Sequera | 6 | 3 | 3
(Czech Republic) K Koukalová | 4 | 6 | 6
7 | (Luxembourg) C Schaul | 4 | 6 | 0
(Japan) A Morigami | 6 | 4 | 0^{r}
(Spain) A Medina Garrigues | 6 | 6
2/WC | (Switzerland) P Schnyder | 2 | 4

Quarterfinals
(Austria) B Schett | 4 | 2
(Czech Republic) K Koukalová | 6 | 6
7 | (Luxembourg) C Schaul | 4 | 0
(Spain) A Medina Garrigues | 6 | 6

Semifinals
(Czech Republic) K Koukalová | 7 | 3
(Spain) A Medina Garrigues | 5 | 0^{r}
