= Maccabi Men's Challenger =

Defunct tennis tournament
- Event name: Melbourne
- Location: Melbourne, Australia
- Venue: Maccabi Tennis Club
- Category: ATP Challenger Tour
- Surface: Hard
- Draw: 32S/32Q/16D
- Prize money: $50,000
- Website: www.tennis.com.au

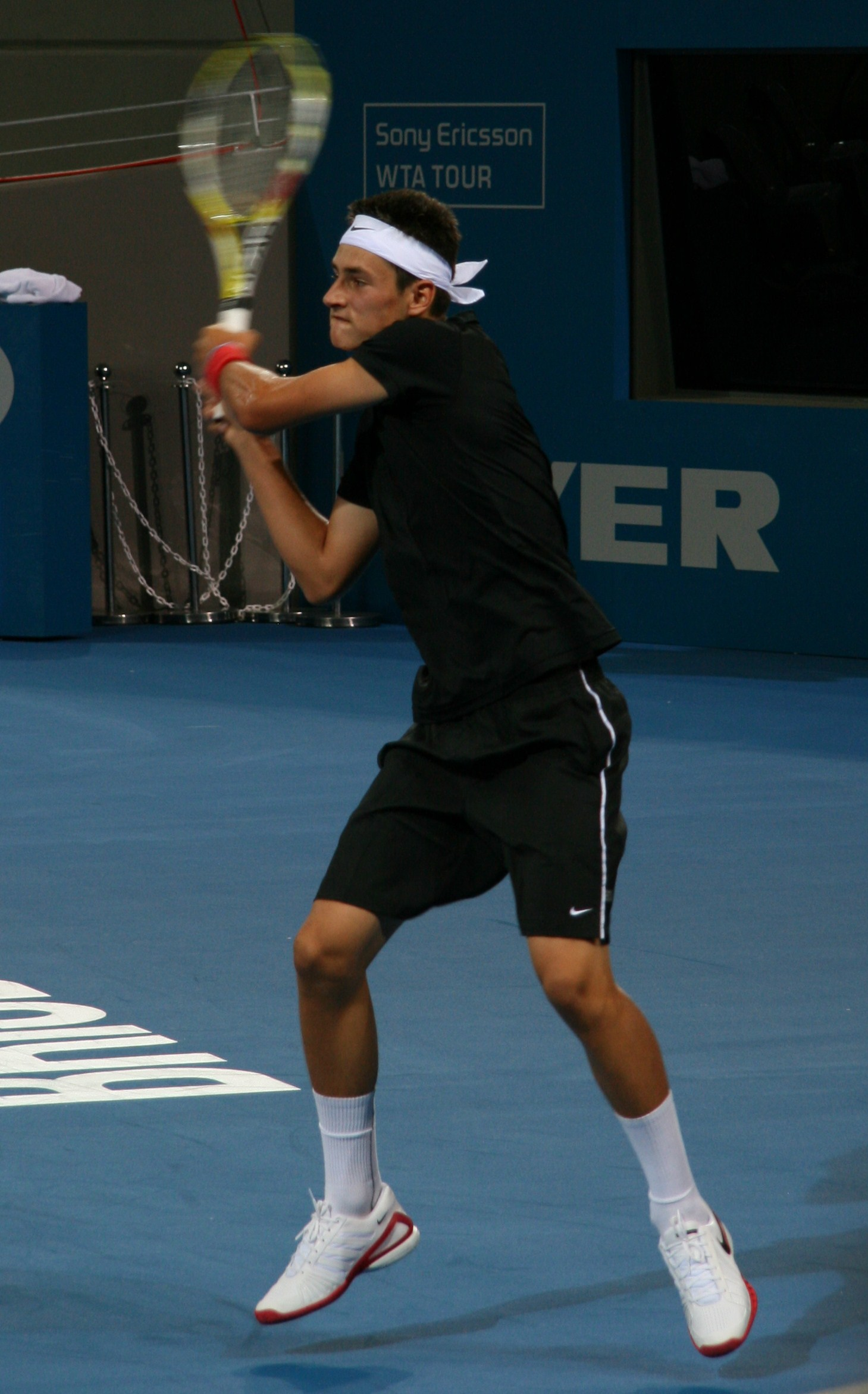
Bernard Tomic won his first ATP Challenger Tour title at the first and only edition of the event

The Maccabi Men's Challenger was a professional tennis tournament played on outdoor hard courts. It was part of the ATP Challenger Tour. It was held at the Maccabi Tennis Club in Melbourne, Australia, in 2009.

== Past finals ==
=== Singles ===
Year	Champion	Runner-up	Score
2009	(Australia) Bernard Tomic	(Australia) Marinko Matosevic	5–7, 6–4, 6–3

=== Doubles ===
Year	Champions	Runners-up	Score
2009	(Thailand) Sanchai Ratiwatana (Thailand) Sonchat Ratiwatana	(Chinese Taipei) Chen Ti (Thailand) Danai Udomchoke	7–6(5), 5–7, 10–7

== 2013 Melbourne Challenger ==
The 2013 Melbourne Challenger was a professional tennis tournament played on outdoor hard court. It was the first edition of the tournament which was part of the 2013 ATP Challenger Tour. It took place in Melbourne, Australia between 21 and 27 October 2013.

== Past finals ==
=== Singles ===
Year	Champion	Runner-up	Score
2013	(Australia) Matthew Ebden	(Japan) Tatsuma Ito	6–3, 5–7, 6–3

=== Doubles ===
Year	Champions	Runners-up	Score
2013	(Australia) Thanasi Kokkinakis (Australia) Benjamin Mitchell	(Australia) Alex Bolt (Australia) Andrew Whittington	6–3, 6–2
