= 2013 Melbourne Challenger =

- Date: 21–27 October
- Edition: 1st
- Location: Melbourne, Australia

Champions

Singles
- (Australia) Matthew Ebden

Doubles
- (Australia) Thanasi Kokkinakis / (Australia) Benjamin Mitchell
Melbourne Challenger

The 2013 Melbourne Challenger was a professional tennis tournament played on outdoor hardcourt. It was the first edition of the tournament which was part of the 2013 ATP Challenger Tour. It took place in Melbourne, Australia between 21 and 27 October 2013.

== Singles main draw entrants ==
=== Seeds ===
Country	Player	Rank^{1}	Seed
AUS	Matthew Ebden	110	1
FRA	Stéphane Robert	118	2
USA	Bradley Klahn	130	3
JPN	Yūichi Sugita	144	4
AUS	James Duckworth	147	5
JPN	Tatsuma Ito	171	6
AUS	Nick Kyrgios	180	7
GBR	James Ward	183	8

- Rankings are as of October 14, 2013.

=== Other entrants ===
The following players received wildcards into the singles main draw:

- (Australia) Thanasi Kokkinakis
- (Australia) Luke Saville
- (Australia) Jordan Thompson
- (Australia) Andrew Whittington

The following players received entry from the qualifying draw:

- (Australia) Maverick Banes
- (Australia) Blake Mott
- (Japan) Kento Takeuchi
- (Australia) James Lemke

== Champions ==
=== Singles ===
- (Australia) Matthew Ebden def. (Japan) Tatsuma Ito 6–3, 5–7, 6–3

=== Doubles ===
- (Australia) Thanasi Kokkinakis / (Australia) Benjamin Mitchell def. (Australia) Alex Bolt / (Australia) Andrew Whittington 6–3, 6–2
