= 2005 Ordina Open =

- Date: 13–19 June
- Edition: 15th (men); 9th (women)
- Category: International Series (men); Tier III (women)
- Prize money: $355,000 (men) $170,000 (women)
- Surface: Grass / outdoor
- Location: Rosmalen, 's-Hertogenbosch, Netherlands

Champions

Men's singles
- (Croatia) Mario Ančić

Women's singles
- (Czechoslovakia) Klára Koukalová

Men's doubles
- (Czech Republic) Cyril Suk / (Czech Republic) Pavel Vízner

Women's doubles
- (Spain) Anabel Medina Garrigues / (Russia) Dinara Safina
- Ordina Open

The 2005 Ordina Open was a combined men's and women's tennis tournament played on grass courts in Rosmalen, 's-Hertogenbosch in the Netherlands that was part of the International Series of the 2005 ATP Tour and of Tier III of the 2003 WTA Tour. The tournament was held from 13 June through 19 June 2005. Mario Ančić and Klára Koukalová won the singles titles.

== Finals ==
=== Men's singles ===
(Croatia) Mario Ančić defeated (France) Michaël Llodra 7–5, 6–4

=== Women's singles ===
(Czechoslovakia) Klára Koukalová defeated (Czechoslovakia) Lucie Šafářová 3–6, 6–2, 6–2

=== Men's doubles ===
(Czech Republic) Cyril Suk / (Czech Republic) Pavel Vízner defeated (Czechoslovakia) Tomáš Cibulec / (Czechoslovakia) Leoš Friedl 6–3, 6–4

=== Women's doubles ===
(Spain) Anabel Medina Garrigues / (Russia) Dinara Safina defeated (Czechoslovakia) Iveta Benešová / (Spain) Nuria Llagostera 6–4, 2–6, 7–6
