= Jan Zakopal =

Czech footballer (born 1977)

Personal information
- Date of birth: 22 October 1977 (age 49)
- Place of birth: Gottwaldow, Czechoslovakia
- Height: 1.86 m (6 ft 1 in)
- Position: Defender

Senior career*
Years	Team	Apps	(Gls)
1995–1998	Sparta Prague	3	(0)
1998–2001	Viktoria Žižkov	58	(0)
2000	České Budějovice	3	(0)
2001–2008	Viktoria Plzeň	162	(5)

International career
1998	Czech Republic U21	1	(0)
- * Club domestic league appearances and goals

Jan Zakopal (born 22 October 1977) is a Czech former football player, who played more than 100 times in the Gambrinus liga. He made one appearance for the Czech Republic U21 team, as well as numerous appearances at lower age groups. He announced his retirement from professional football in February 2008.

== Personal life ==
Zakopal married Czech tennis player Klára Zakopalová (née Koukalová) in 2006. Jan Zakopal and Klára divorced in January 2014.
