= 2004 Ordina Open – Men's singles =

Men's singles
- 2004 Ordina Open

Final
- Champion: (France) Michaël Llodra
- Runner-up: (Argentina) Guillermo Coria
- Score: 6–3, 6–4

Details
- Draw: 32 (4 Q / 3 WC )
- Seeds: 8

Events
Singles	men	women
Doubles	men	women
- Rosmalen Grass Court Championships

Sjeng Schalken was the defending champion, but lost in the first round this year.

Michaël Llodra won the title, beating Guillermo Coria 6–3, 6–4 in the final.

== Seeds ==
1. (Argentina) Guillermo Coria (final)
2. (Germany) Rainer Schüttler (first round)
3. (Netherlands) Sjeng Schalken (first round)
4. (Spain) Tommy Robredo (semifinals)
5. (Slovakia) Dominik Hrbatý (first round)
6. (Russia) Mikhail Youzhny (second round, retired because of a virus infection)
7. (France) Arnaud Clément (quarterfinals)
8. (Spain) Fernando Verdasco (quarterfinals)

== Draw ==
Key

- Q = Qualifier
- WC = Wild card
- LL = Lucky loser
- Alt = Alternate
- ITF = ITF entry
- PR = Protected ranking
- SR = Special ranking
- SE = Special exempt
- JE = Junior exempt
- JR = Junior Accelerator Programme entrant
- CO = College Accelerator Programme entrant
- NG = Next Gen Accelerator Program entrant
- w/o = Walkover
- r = Retired
- d = Defaulted

=== Finals ===
Semifinals
WC/1	(Argentina) Guillermo Coria	7^{7}	1	6
(Croatia) Mario Ančić	6^{4}	6	3
4	(Spain) Tommy Robredo	3	2
WC	(France) Michaël Llodra	6	6

Final
WC/1	(Argentina) Guillermo Coria	3	4
WC	(France) Michaël Llodra	6	6

=== Top half ===
First round
WC/1	(Argentina) G Coria	6	6
(Slovakia) K Beck	3	3
Q	(Switzerland) G Bastl	6^{7}	4
Q	(Germany) M Kohlmann	7^{9}	6
(Netherlands) D van Scheppingen	6	6
(Argentina) J Acasuso	3	2
(Croatia) I Karlović	6^{8}	7^{7}	3
7	(France) A Clément	7^{10}	6^{5}	6
3	(Netherlands) S Schalken	6	3	2
(Croatia) M Ančić	4	6	6
WC	(Netherlands) P Wessels	1	3
(Russia) I Andreev	6	6
(Belgium) K Vliegen	6^{2}	4
(Netherlands) M Verkerk	7^{7}	6
(France) A Dupuis	4	0
6	(Russia) M Youzhny	6	6

Second round
WC/1	(Argentina) G Coria	6	6
Q	(Germany) M Kohlmann	4	2
(Netherlands) D van Scheppingen	5	0^{r}
7	(France) A Clément	7	1
(Croatia) M Ančić	6	6
(Russia) I Andreev	3	1
(Netherlands) M Verkerk	6	2
6	(Russia) M Youzhny	2	0^{r}

Quarterfinals
WC/1	(Argentina) G Coria	6	7
7	(France) A Clément	2	5
(Croatia) M Ančić	6	6
(Netherlands) M Verkerk	3	3

Semifinals
WC/1	(Argentina) G Coria	7^{7}	1	6
(Croatia) M Ančić	6^{4}	6	3

=== Bottom half ===
First round
8	(Spain) F Verdasco	3	7^{9}	6
Q	(Switzerland) J-C Scherrer	6	6^{7}	4
(France) T Ascione	2	0
(Netherlands) J van Lottum	6	6
(Argentina) G Cañas	6	6
(Russia) N Davydenko	4	4
(Germany) L Burgsmüller	6	4	4
4	(Spain) T Robredo	3	6	6
5	(Slovakia) D Hrbatý	4	4
(Czech Republic) J Vacek	6	6
WC	(France) M Llodra	6	6
(Chinese Taipei) Y-h Lu	3	1
(Germany) A Popp	1	7	4
Q	(Germany) P Petzschner	6	5	6
(Netherlands) R Sluiter	3	7^{7}	6
2	(Germany) R Schüttler	6	6^{2}	3

Second round
8	(Spain) F Verdasco	5
(Netherlands) J van Lottum	4^{r}
(Argentina) G Cañas	5	6	5
4	(Spain) T Robredo	7	1	7
(Czech Republic) J Vacek	3	4
WC	(France) M Llodra	6	6
Q	(Germany) P Petzschner	3	0
(Netherlands) R Sluiter	6	6

Quarterfinals
8	(Spain) F Verdasco	6^{5}	2
4	(Spain) T Robredo	7^{7}	6
WC	(France) M Llodra	6^{2}	7^{7}	6
(Netherlands) R Sluiter	7^{7}	6^{5}	3

Semifinals
4	(Spain) T Robredo	3	2
WC	(France) M Llodra	6	6
