= 2004 Ordina Open – Men's doubles =

Men's doubles
- 2004 Ordina Open

Final
- Champions: (Czech Republic) Martin Damm (Czech Republic) Cyril Suk
- Runners-up: (Germany) Lars Burgsmüller (Czech Republic) Daniel Vacek
- Score: 6–3, 6–7^{(7–9)}, 6–3

Details
- Draw: 16
- Seeds: 4

Events
Singles	men	women
Doubles	men	women
- Rosmalen Grass Court Championships

Martin Damm and Cyril Suk, the two-time defending champions, successfully defended their title, by defeating Lars Burgsmüller and Daniel Vacek 6–3, 6–7^{(7–9)}, 6–3 in the final.

== Seeds ==
1. (Czech Republic) Martin Damm / (Czech Republic) Cyril Suk (champions)
2. (Argentina) Gastón Etlis / (Argentina) Martín Rodríguez (quarterfinals)
3. (Israel) Jonathan Erlich / (India) Leander Paes (semifinals)
4. (United States) Jared Palmer / (Czech Republic) Pavel Vízner (semifinals)

== Draw ==
Key

- Q = Qualifier
- WC = Wild card
- LL = Lucky loser
- Alt = Alternate
- ITF = ITF entry
- PR = Protected ranking
- SR = Special ranking
- SE = Special exempt
- JE = Junior exempt
- JR = Junior Accelerator Programme entrant
- CO = College Accelerator Programme entrant
- NG = Next Gen Accelerator Program entrant
- w/o = Walkover
- r = Retired
- d = Defaulted

=== Draw ===
First round
1	(Czech Republic) M Damm (Czech Republic) C Suk	6	7^{7}
(Switzerland) Y Allegro (Germany) M Kohlmann	4	6^{3}
(Poland) M Fyrstenberg (Poland) M Matkowski	6	6
WC	(Netherlands) D van Scheppingen (Netherlands) P Wessels	3	4
3	(Israel) J Erlich (India) L Paes	6	6
(Czech Republic) T Cibulec (Czech Republic) P Pála	4	2
(Argentina) G Cañas (Argentina) M García	7^{7}	6^{3}	7^{7}
(France) T Ascione (France) M Llodra	6^{5}	7^{7}	6^{1}
(Slovakia) D Hrbatý (United States) G Oliver	7	6
(Netherlands) R Sluiter (Netherlands) M Verkerk	5	4
(Croatia) I Karlović (United States) J Thomas	4	6^{3}
4	(United States) J Palmer (Czech Republic) P Vízner	6	7^{7}
Alt	(Germany) L Burgsmüller (Czech Republic) J Vacek	7^{7}	7^{8}
(Argentina) J Acasuso (Argentina) G Coria	6^{2}	6^{6}
(Germany) K Braasch (Spain) T Robredo	3	6^{9}
2	(Argentina) G Etlis (Argentina) M Rodríguez	6	7^{11}

Quarterfinals
1	(Czech Republic) M Damm (Czech Republic) C Suk	6	6
(Poland) M Fyrstenberg (Poland) M Matkowski	4	4
3	(Israel) J Erlich (India) L Paes	6	6
(France) T Ascione (France) M Llodra	3	2
(Slovakia) D Hrbatý (United States) G Oliver	6^{3}	7^{7}	4
4	(United States) J Palmer (Czech Republic) P Vízner	7^{7}	6^{4}	6
Alt	(Germany) L Burgsmüller (Czech Republic) J Vacek	6	6
2	(Argentina) G Etlis (Argentina) M Rodríguez	4	4

Semifinals
1	(Czech Republic) M Damm (Czech Republic) C Suk	6	7^{7}
3	(Israel) J Erlich (India) L Paes	4	6^{1}
4	(United States) J Palmer (Czech Republic) P Vízner	4	6	3
Alt	(Germany) L Burgsmüller (Czech Republic) J Vacek	6	3	6

Final
1	(Czech Republic) M Damm (Czech Republic) C Suk	6	6^{7}	6
Alt	(Germany) L Burgsmüller (Czech Republic) J Vacek	3	7^{9}	3
