= 2013 Melbourne Challenger – Singles =

Singles
- 2013 Melbourne Challenger

Final
- Champion: (Australia) Matthew Ebden
- Runner-up: (Japan) Tatsuma Ito
- Score: 6–3, 5–7, 6–3

Events
Singles	Doubles
Melbourne Challenger

This is the first edition of the event and was won by Australian Matthew Ebden defeating Tatsuma Ito in the final.

== Seeds ==
1. (Australia) Matthew Ebden (champions)
2. (France) Stéphane Robert (first round)
3. (United States) Bradley Klahn (quarterfinals)
4. (Japan) Yūichi Sugita (first round)
5. (Australia) James Duckworth (semifinals)
6. (Japan) Tatsuma Ito (final)
7. (Australia) Nick Kyrgios (first round)
8. (United Kingdom) James Ward (semifinals)

== Draw ==
=== Key ===
- Q = Qualifier
- WC = Wild card
- LL = Lucky loser
- Alt = Alternate
- SE = Special exempt
- PR = Protected ranking
- ITF = ITF entry
- JE = Junior exempt
- w/o = Walkover
- r = Retired
- d = Defaulted
- SR = Special ranking

=== Finals ===
Semifinals
1	(Australia) Matthew Ebden	6	5	6
8	(United Kingdom) James Ward	0	7	0
6	(Japan) Tatsuma Ito	4	6	7^{10}
5	(Australia) James Duckworth	6	3	6^{8}

Final
1	(Australia) Matthew Ebden	6	5	6
6	(Japan) Tatsuma Ito	3	7	3

=== Top half ===
First round
1	(Australia) M Ebden	6^{3}	6	6
(Japan) Y Uchiyama	7^{7}	3	3
WC	(Australia) T Kokkinakis	6	6
Q	(Japan) K Takeuchi	3	3
WC	(Australia) Jordan Thompson	6	6
(Australia) D Propoggia	3	2
Q	(Australia) B Mott	6	7
7	(Australia) N Kyrgios	3	5
4	(Japan) Y Sugita	2	4
(Japan) Shuichi Sekiguchi	6	6
(New Zealand) M Venus	6	6
(United Kingdom) B Klein	3	4
(Australia) A Feeney	6	2	2
WC	(Australia) A Whittington	1	6	6
(Australia) G Jones	4	0
8	(United Kingdom) J Ward	6	6

Second round
1	(Australia) M Ebden	1	7	6
WC	(Australia) T Kokkinakis	6	5	1
WC	(Australia) J Thompson	6	3	1
Q	(Australia) B Mott	4	6	6
(Japan) S Sekiguchi	3	2
(New Zealand) M Venus	6	6
WC	(Australia) A Whittington	7	4	3
8	(United Kingdom) J Ward	5	6	6

Quarterfinals
1	(Australia) M Ebden	6	6
Q	(Australia) B Mott	4	1
(New Zealand) M Venus	6	6^{2}	4
8	(United Kingdom) J Ward	3	7^{7}	6

Semifinals
1	(Australia) M Ebden	6	5	6
8	(United Kingdom) J Ward	0	7	0

=== Bottom half ===
First round
6	(Japan) T Ito	6	6
(Thailand) D Udomchoke	3	4
(South Korea) Y-k Lim	6	6
(Australia) M Reid	3	4
(Japan) H Moriya	6	6
WC	(Australia) L Saville	4	1
(Australia) B Mitchell	6^{3}	4
3	(United States) B Klahn	7^{7}	6
5	(Australia) J Duckworth	7^{7}	6
(Australia) A Bolt	6^{2}	3
(France) J Dasnières de Veigy	4	4
(New Zealand) J Statham	6	6
(India) Y Bhambri	6	6
Q	(Australia) J Lemke	4	0
Q	(Australia) M Banes	7^{8}	1	6
2	(France) S Robert	6^{6}	6	3

Second round
6	(Japan) T Ito	6	6
(South Korea) Y-k Lim	3	3
(Japan) H Moriya	1	3
3	(United States) B Klahn	6	6
5	(Australia) J Duckworth	6	6
(New Zealand) J Statham	3	4
(India) Y Bhambri	6	7^{7}
Q	(Australia) M Banes	1	6^{5}

Quarterfinals
6	(Japan) T Ito	6	6
3	(United States) B Klahn	3	3
5	(Australia) J Duckworth	6	6
(India) Y Bhambri	3	4

Semifinals
6	(Japan) T Ito	4	6	7^{10}
5	(Australia) J Duckworth	6	3	6^{8}
