= 2005 Ordina Open – Women's singles =

Women's singles
- 2005 Ordina Open

Final
- Champion: (Czech Republic) Klára Koukalová
- Runner-up: (Czech Republic) Lucie Šafářová
- Score: 3–6, 6–2, 6–2

Details
- Draw: 30 (2 WC )
- Seeds: 8

Events
Singles	men	women
Doubles	men	women
← 2004 ·	Ordina Open	· 2006 →

Mary Pierce was the defending champion, but did not compete this year.

Eighth-seeded Klára Koukalová won the title by defeating Lucie Šafářová 3–6, 6–2, 6–2 in the final.

== Seeds ==
The top two seeds receive a bye into the second round.

1. (Russia) Elena Dementieva (second round, retired due to a right shoulder strain)
2. (Russia) Nadia Petrova (quarterfinals)
3. (Spain) Anabel Medina Garrigues (second round)
4. (Russia) Dinara Safina (quarterfinals)
5. (Spain) Nuria Llagostera Vives (first round)
6. (Argentina) Gisela Dulko (semifinals)
7. (Germany) Anna-Lena Grönefeld (second round, retired due to a right groin strain)
8. (Czech Republic) Klára Koukalová (champion)

== Draw ==
=== Key ===
- Q = Qualifier
- WC = Wild card
- LL = Lucky loser
- Alt = Alternate
- ITF = ITF entry
- PR = Protected ranking
- SR = Special ranking
- SE = Special exempt
- JE = Junior exempt
- JR = Junior Accelerator Programme entrant
- CO = College Accelerator Programme entrant
- NG = Next Gen Accelerator Program entrant
- w/o = Walkover
- r = Retired
- d = Defaulted

=== Finals ===
Semifinals
8	(Czech Republic) Klára Koukalová	6	7
(United States) Meghann Shaughnessy	1	5
(Czech Republic) Lucie Šafářová	6	6
6	(Argentina) Gisela Dulko	3	3

Final
8	(Czech Republic) Klára Koukalová	3	6	6
(Czech Republic) Lucie Šafářová	6	2	2

=== Top half ===
First round
WC	(Iran) A Rezaï	6	4	4
(Czech Republic) D Chládková	3	6	6
WC	(United States) M Navratilova	6	1	4
(Luxembourg) C Schaul	4	6	6
(Poland) M Domachowska	6	4	3
8	(Czech Republic) K Koukalová	3	6	6
3	(Spain) A Medina Garrigues	6	7^{7}
(Czech Republic) I Benešová	4	6^{5}
WC	(Netherlands) M Krajicek	6	6
(Slovakia) Ľ Cervanová	1	3
(United States) M Shaughnessy	6	6
(Israel) A Smashnova	2	4
(Russia) A Jidkova	3	2
7	(Germany) A-L Grönefeld	6	6

Second round
1	(Russia) E Dementieva	5^{r}
(Czech Republic) D Chládková	5
(Luxembourg) C Schaul	6	4	0
8	(Czech Republic) K Koukalová	4	6	6
3	(Spain) A Medina Garrigues	3	6	2
WC	(Netherlands) M Krajicek	6	3	6
(United States) M Shaughnessy	7^{11}	3	3
7	(Germany) A-L Grönefeld	6^{9}	6	0^{r}

Quarterfinals
(Czech Republic) D Chládková	3	3
8	(Czech Republic) K Koukalová	6	6
WC	(Netherlands) M Krajicek	4^{r}
(United States) M Shaughnessy	3

Semifinals
8	(Czech Republic) K Koukalová	6	7
(United States) M Shaughnessy	1	5

=== Bottom half ===
First round
5	(Spain) N Llagostera Vives	7^{7}	6^{5}	4
(Czech Republic) L Šafářová	6^{5}	7^{7}	6
(Spain) V Ruano Pascual	6	3	6
(Australia) E Dominikovic	4	6	4
(Russia) M Kirilenko	6	6
(Czech Republic) K Peschke	4	3
(Israel) S Pe'er	2	1
4	(Russia) D Safina	6	6
6	(Argentina) G Dulko	6	6
(Madagascar) D Randriantefy	4	1
(Italy) ME Camerin	7^{7}	6
(Australia) S Stosur	6^{1}	1
(Argentina) M Díaz Oliva	1	6	6
(Croatia) J Kostanić	6	2	3

Second round
(Czech Republic) L Šafářová	6	6
(Spain) V Ruano Pascual	1	1
(Russia) M Kirilenko	4	6^{2}
4	(Russia) D Safina	6	7^{7}
6	(Argentina) G Dulko	6	6
(Italy) ME Camerin	3	0
(Argentina) M Díaz Oliva	3	4
2	(Russia) N Petrova	6	6

Quarterfinals
(Czech Republic) L Šafářová	6	6
4	(Russia) D Safina	4	4
6	(Argentina) G Dulko	6	4	6
2	(Russia) N Petrova	4	6	3

Semifinals
(Czech Republic) L Šafářová	6	6
6	(Argentina) G Dulko	3	3
