= 2011 UNICEF Open – Women's singles qualifying =

This article displays the qualifying draw of the 2011 UNICEF Open.

== Players ==
=== Seeds ===
1. (Slovakia) ~~Magdaléna Rybáriková~~
2. (Italy) Romina Oprandi (qualified)
3. (Russia) Vesna Dolonts (qualifying competition)
4. (United States) Coco Vandeweghe (qualifying competition)
5. (Uzbekistan) Akgul Amanmuradova (qualified)
6. (Netherlands) Arantxa Rus (qualified)
7. (Belarus) Olga Govortsova (withdrew because was still playing in 2011 Aegon Classic in Birmingham)
8. (Czech Republic) Sandra Záhlavová (qualifying competition)
9. (Belarus) Anastasiya Yakimova (qualifying competition, retired)

=== Qualifiers ===
1. (Uzbekistan) Akgul Amanmuradova
2. (Italy) Romina Oprandi
3. (Belgium) Alison van Uytvanck
4. (Netherlands) Arantxa Rus

== Qualifying draw ==
=== First qualifier ===
First round
9	(Belarus) Anastasiya Yakimova	7	6
WC	(Netherlands) Demi Schuurs	5	4
(Russia) Daria Gavrilova	6	3	4
5	(Uzbekistan) Akgul Amanmuradova	3	6	6

Qualifying competition
9	(Belarus) Anastasiya Yakimova	3^{r}
5	(Uzbekistan) Akgul Amanmuradova	1

=== Second qualifier ===
First round
2	(Italy) Romina Oprandi	6	6
(Belarus) Tatiana Poutchek	2	2
Alt	(Latvia) Līga Dekmeijere	1	3
8	(Czech Republic) Sandra Záhlavová	6	6

Qualifying competition
2	(Italy) Romina Oprandi	6	6
8	(Czech Republic) Sandra Záhlavová	1	4

=== Third qualifier ===
First round
3	(Russia) Vesna Dolonts	7^{9}	3	6
(Ukraine) Kateryna Bondarenko	6^{7}	6	2
(Belgium) Alison van Uytvanck	w/o
7	(Belarus) Olga Govortsova

Qualifying competition
3	(Russia) Vesna Dolonts	3	1
(Belgium) Alison van Uytvanck	6	6

=== Fourth qualifier ===
First round
4	(United States) Coco Vandeweghe	2	6	6
(China) Sun Shengnan	6	4	1
WC	(Netherlands) Indy de Vroome	3	0
6	(Netherlands) Arantxa Rus	6	6

Qualifying competition
4	(United States) Coco Vandeweghe	4	4
6	(Netherlands) Arantxa Rus	6	6
