= 2013 Melbourne Challenger – Doubles =

Doubles
- 2013 Melbourne Challenger

Final
- Champion: (Australia) Thanasi Kokkinakis (Australia) Benjamin Mitchell
- Runner-up: (Australia) Alex Bolt (Australia) Andrew Whittington
- Score: 6–3, 6–2

Events
Singles	Doubles
Melbourne Challenger

Australian pairing of Thanasi Kokkinakis and Benjamin Mitchell defeated compatriots Alex Bolt and Andrew Whittington, 6–3, 6–2, to be the inaugural champions.

== Seeds ==
1. (Australia) Chris Guccione / (Australia) Matt Reid (semifinals)
2. (Australia) Dane Propoggia / (New Zealand) Jose Statham (quarterfinals)
3. (United States) Bradley Klahn / (New Zealand) Michael Venus (quarterfinals)
4. (United Kingdom) Brydan Klein / (Thailand) Danai Udomchoke (semifinals)

== Draw ==
=== Key ===
- Q = Qualifier
- WC = Wild card
- LL = Lucky loser
- Alt = Alternate
- SE = Special exempt
- PR = Protected ranking
- ITF = ITF entry
- JE = Junior exempt
- w/o = Walkover
- r = Retired
- d = Defaulted
- SR = Special ranking

=== Draw ===
First round
1	(Australia) C Guccione (Australia) M Reid	6	6
PR	(Australia) J Lemke (Australia) Jarryd Maher	4	1
(South Korea) Y-k Lim (Japan) Y Sugita
(Japan) B Sato (Japan) Shuichi Sekiguchi	w/o
4	(United Kingdom) B Klein (Thailand) D Udomchoke	6	5	[12]
(Australia) R Agar (Australia) A Feeney	3	7	[10]
(France) J Dasnières de Veigy (France) S Robert	3	2
(Australia) A Bolt (Australia) A Whittington	6	6
WC	(Australia) T Kokkinakis (Australia) B Mitchell	6	2	[10]
(Australia) L Saville (Australia) J Thompson	4	6	[6]
(India) Y Bhambri (Japan) Y Uchiyama	4	6	[5]
3	(United States) B Klahn (New Zealand) M Venus	6	3	[10]
(Australia) G Jones (United Kingdom) J Ward
(Japan) T Ito (Japan) H Moriya	w/o
WC	(Australia) M Banes (Australia) Gavin van Peperzeel	2	2
2	(Australia) D Propoggia (New Zealand) J Statham	6	6

Quarterfinals
1	(Australia) C Guccione (Australia) M Reid	6	6
(Japan) B Sato (Japan) S Sekiguchi	3	2
4	(United Kingdom) B Klein (Thailand) D Udomchoke	5	3
(Australia) A Bolt (Australia) A Whittington	7	6
WC	(Australia) T Kokkinakis (Australia) B Mitchell	6	1	[11]
3	(United States) B Klahn (New Zealand) M Venus	3	6	[9]
(Japan) T Ito (Japan) H Moriya	6	3	[10]
2	(Australia) D Propoggia (New Zealand) J Statham	4	6	[6]

Semifinals
1	(Australia) C Guccione (Australia) M Reid	3	5
(Australia) A Bolt (Australia) A Whittington	6	7
WC	(Australia) T Kokkinakis (Australia) B Mitchell	6	6
(Japan) T Ito (Japan) H Moriya	2	3

Final
(Australia) A Bolt (Australia) A Whittington	3	2
WC	(Australia) T Kokkinakis (Australia) B Mitchell	6	6
