= Zuzanna Maciejewska =

Polish tennis player

- Country (sports): Poland
- Residence: Warsaw, Poland
- Born: 19 January 1995 (age 31) Toruń, Poland
- Height: 1.88 m (6 ft 2 in)
- Plays: Left (two-handed backhand)
- University: Barry University (2016–2019)
- Prize money: $11,568

Singles
- Career record: 37–37
- Career titles: 0
- Highest ranking: No. 574 (26 August 2013)

Doubles
- Career record: 20–15
- Career titles: 2 ITF
- Highest ranking: No. 699 (6 April 2015)

Zuzanna Maciejewska (born 19 January 1995) is a Polish former tennis player.

Maciejewska had a career-high singles ranking of 574 by the WTA, achieved on 26 August 2013. She also had a career-high doubles ranking of 699, achieved on 6 April 2015.

Maciejewska made her WTA Tour debut at the 2014 Katowice Open, in the doubles event, partnering Magdalena Fręch, losing in the first round to fourth seeds Shuko Aoyama and Renata Voráčová, 1–6, 3–6.

== ITF finals ==
=== Doubles (2–0) ===
Legend $25,000 tournaments $10,000 tournaments	Finals by surface Clay (1–0) Carpet (1–0)

Result	Date	Tournament	Surface	Partner	Opponents	Score
Win	2 June 2013	ITF Cantanhede, Portugal	Carpet	(Poland) Agata Barańska	(Argentina) Aranza Salut (Argentina) Carolina Zeballos	6–7^{(4)}, 6–4, [12–10]
Win	15 August 2014	ITF Innsbruck, Austria	Clay	(Italy) Camilla Rosatello	(Bulgaria) Isabella Shinikova (Bulgaria) Julia Stamatova	6–2, 6–2
