= Tobias Klein =

German tennis player

- Country (sports): Germany
- Born: 23 March 1982 (age 43) Schwetzingen, West Germany
- Height: 5 ft 7 in (170 cm)
- Plays: Right-handed
- Prize money: $19,838

Singles
- Career record: 0–1 (ATP Tour)
- Highest ranking: No. 591 (24 Apr 2006)

Doubles
- Highest ranking: No. 521 (20 Mar 2006)

Tobias Klein (born 23 March 1982), also known as Tobi Klein, is a German former professional tennis player.

Klein, a native of Baden-Württemberg, was a collegiate player for the University of Alabama at Birmingham.

Competing professionally from 2004, Klein's most notable achievement was qualifying for the main draw of the 2005 Ordina Open, an ATP Tour tournament in s-Hertogenbosch, Netherlands. He reached his career best singles world ranking of 591 in 2006 and won five ITF Futures titles as a doubles player.

== ITF Futures titles ==
=== Doubles: (5) ===
No.	Date	Tournament	Surface	Partner	Opponents	Score
1.	Feb 2006	Switzerland F1, Wilen	Carpet	(Jamaica) Dustin Brown	(Georgia (country)) Lado Chikhladze (Latvia) Deniss Pavlovs	6–4, 4–6, 7–5
2.	Mar 2006	Switzerland F2, Leuggern	Carpet	(Jamaica) Dustin Brown	(Germany) Jerome Becker (Germany) Julian Reister	4–6, 6–3, 7–6^{(2)}
3.	Sep 2008	Germany F20, Nürnberg	Clay	(Germany) Holger Fischer	(Germany) Martin Emmrich (Germany) Sascha Klör	2–1, ret.
4.	Jun 2009	Romania F5, Bacău	Clay	(Switzerland) Alexander Sadecky	(Moldova) Radu Albot (Moldova) Andrei Ciumac	6–4, 6–3
5.	Apr 2013	Turkey F17, Antalya	Hard	(Japan) Hiroyasu Ehara	(Serbia) Denis Bejtulahi (Hungary) Viktor Filipenkó	7–6^{(3)}, 6–1
