= Klára Koukalová =

Czech tennis player (born 1982)

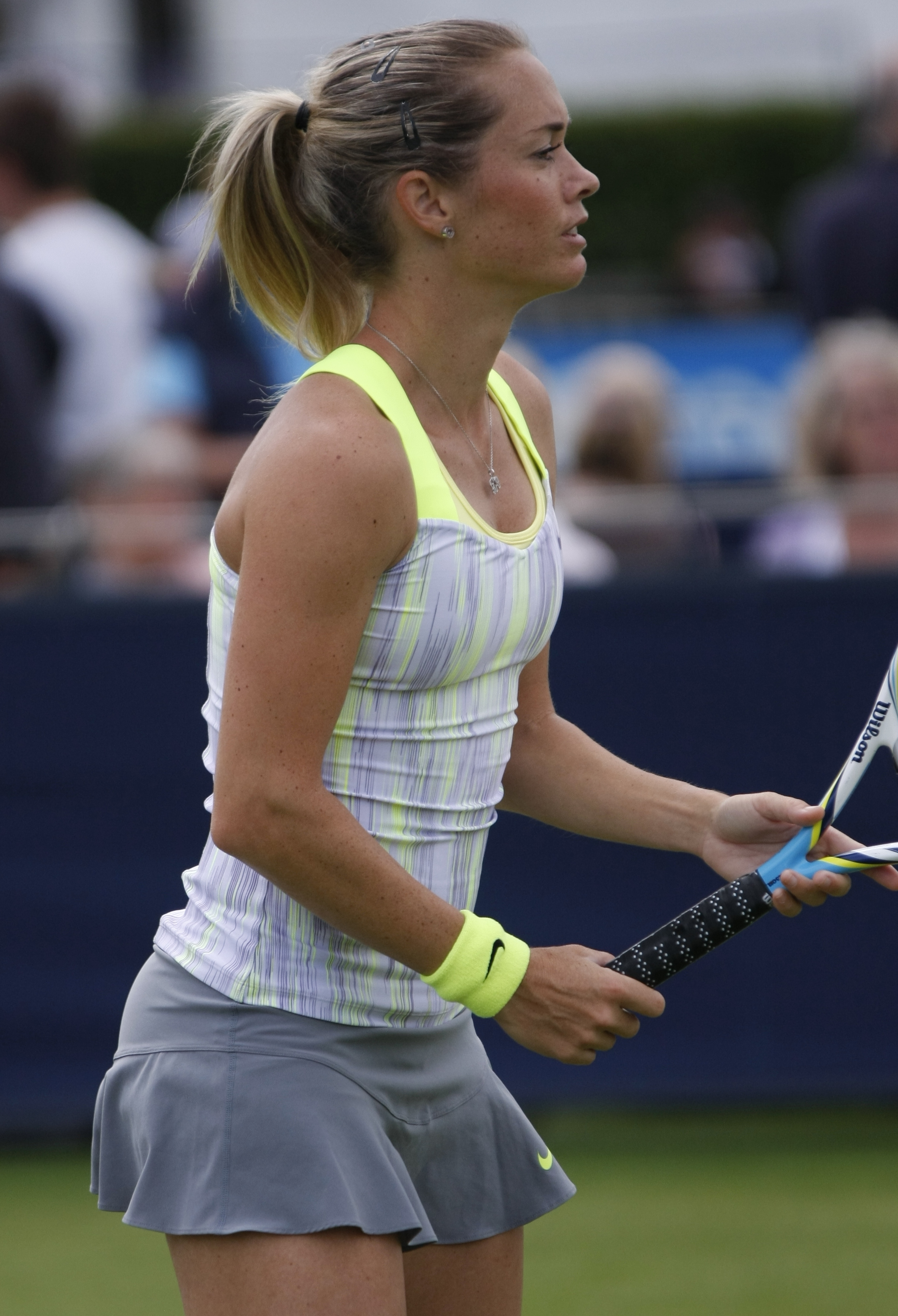
- Koukalová at the 2013 Aegon International
- Country (sports): Czech Republic
- Residence: Prague, Czech Republic
- Born: 24 February 1982 (age 44) Prague, Czechoslovakia
- Height: 1.66 m (5 ft 5 in)
- Turned pro: 1999
- Retired: 26 September 2016
- Plays: Right-handed (two-handed backhand)
- Prize money: US$ 4,084,344

Singles
- Career record: 510–434
- Career titles: 3
- Highest ranking: No. 20 (15 April 2013)

Grand Slam singles results
- Australian Open: 3R (2003)
- French Open: 4R (2012)
- Wimbledon: 4R (2010)
- US Open: 1R (2003–08, 2010–15)

Other tournaments
- Olympic Games: 1R (2004, 2008, 2012)

Doubles
- Career record: 105–147
- Career titles: 4
- Highest ranking: No. 31 (19 May 2014)

Grand Slam doubles results
- Australian Open: 2R (2008, 2011, 2014)
- French Open: 3R (2012)
- Wimbledon: 2R (2010, 2011, 2014)
- US Open: 3R (2014)

Grand Slam mixed doubles results
- Wimbledon: 1R (2014)
- US Open: 1R (2014)

Team competitions
- Fed Cup: 10–5

Klára Koukalová (formerly Zakopalová; born 24 February 1982) is a Czech former tennis player. She was born and still lives in Prague. Having turned professional in 1999, she reached a career-high singles ranking of world No. 20, on 15 April 2013. In doubles, she reached a career-high ranking of 31, on 19 May 2014. Koukalová won three WTA singles titles and four doubles titles during her career.

== Career ==
=== 2003–2009 ===
Koukalová made her Grand Slam debut at the 2003 Australian Open, defeating fellow qualifier and Grand Slam debutante Maria Sharapova in the first round, before going on to upset sixth-seed Monica Seles. Her run ended in the third round.

She won her first two WTA singles titles in 2005, first at the Rosmalen Open, where she defeated Lucie Šafářová in the final, and then at the Slovenia Open, where she overcame Katarina Srebotnik in the championship match.

In January 2006, she played comeback player Martina Hingis, at the WTA Tour tournament in Gold Coast, where she lost in the second round. Koukalová was seeded 29th at the Australian Open, but lost in the first round to Ekaterina Bychkova. In that year, she had ten first-round losses in singles and failed to win a doubles match.

In 2008, Koukalová reached the final of the inaugural Cachantún Cup in Chile. She played the top seed Flavia Pennetta, but was forced to retire due to a sprained ankle. This also forced her to withdraw from the next tournament in Bogotá, where she had made the quarterfinals in 2007.

Koukalová's biggest win came at the 2009 Andalucia Tennis Experience in Marbella, Spain. She defeated world No. 1 and ten-time Grand Slam champion, Serena Williams, in three sets. Williams was also her first-round opponent at the French Open, Koulalová this time lost.

=== 2010 ===
She gained another good win over a top-5 player, defeating Dinara Safina in the first round of the Madrid Open.

In the first round of the Warsaw Open, Koukalová caused a big upset by defeating fourth seed and world No. 14, Marion Bartoli. She was then defeated by world No. 205, Gréta Arn, in the second round.

At the Wimbledon Championships, Koukalová advanced to the fourth round for the first time at a Grand Slam. She scored upset wins over 18th seed Aravane Rezaï and tenth seed Flavia Pennetta, before falling to qualifier Kaia Kanepi.

Koukalová made the final at the Danish Open, where she lost to then world No. 3, Caroline Wozniacki. She defeated Rossana de los Rios, Tatjana Malek, Sorana Cîrstea, and Li Na en route to the final. After this tournament, she could not match her performance as she went on to do poorly in her last four tournaments, only advancing to the second round at Linz, where she lost to Patty Schnyder.

=== 2011 ===
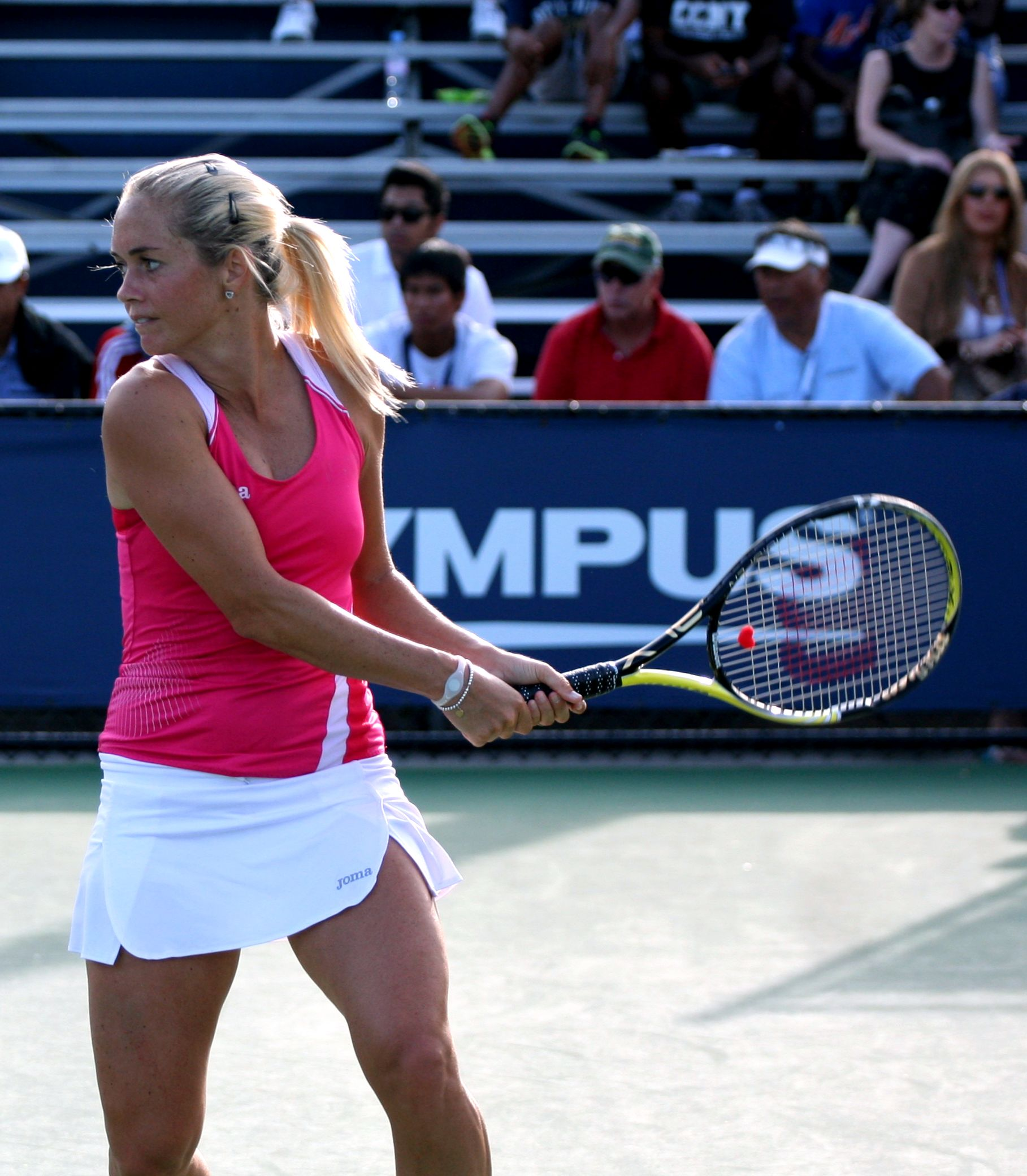
Koukalová at the 2011 US Open

Koukalová started season at the Hobart International. Seeded fifth, she lost in her semifinal match to sixth seed and eventual champion, Jarmila Groth. At the Australian Open, Koukalová was defeated in the second round by 31st seed Lucie Šafářová.

Playing in at the Paris Indoor event, Koukalová lost in the second round to seventh seed Yanina Wickmayer. She was seeded 31st for the French Open, her first seeding at a Grand Slam tournament since 2006. She was upset in the first round by Taiwanese qualifier Chan Yung-jan.

After her defeat at Roland Garros, Koukalová traveled to Copenhagen to defend her finalist points from the year before. Seeded second, she was upset in the first round by German Kathrin Wörle.

Koukalová then returned to the site of her greatest Grand Slam accomplishment, Wimbledon. Unseeded, she came from a set down to defeat British wildcard Emily Webley-Smith in the first round. In the second round, she avenged her Australian Open loss by upsetting 31st seed Lucie Šafářová in three sets. In the third round, Koukalová fell to eventual finalist Maria Sharapova.

She then made the semifinals in Budapest, where she lost to the eventual champion Roberta Vinci, and then made the quarterfinals in Palermo, where she lost to eventual finalist Polona Hercog.

=== 2014 ===
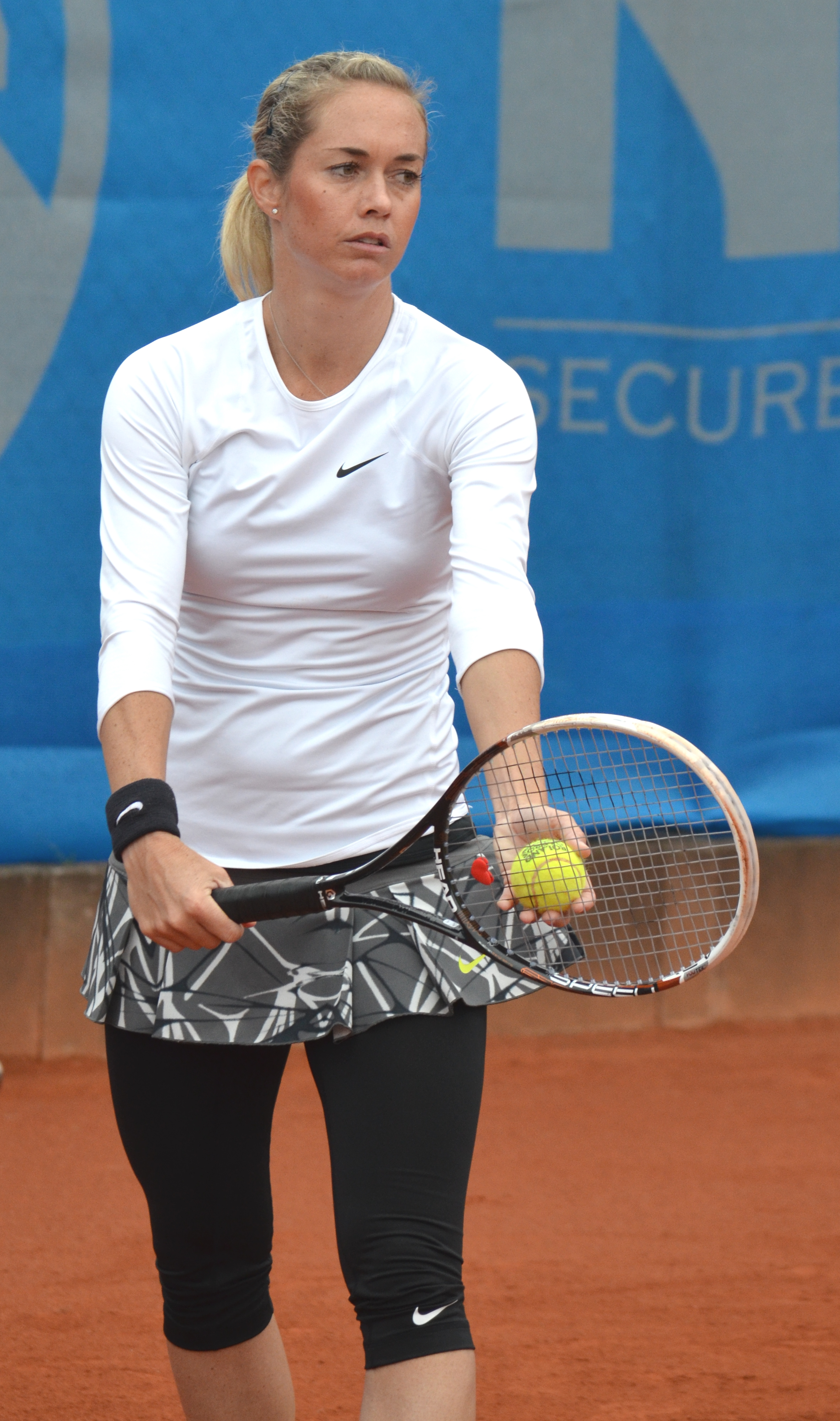
Koukalová at the 2014 Nürnberger Versicherungscup

Koukalová began her year at the Shenzhen Open. Despite being the third seed and last year finalist, she lost in the second round to Patricia Mayr-Achleitner. In doubles, she and Niculescu won the title defeating Lyudmyla Kichenok/Nadiia Kichenok in the final. Seeded seventh at the Hobart International, Koukalová reached the final where she was defeated by qualifier Garbiñe Muguruza. However, in doubles, she and Niculescu won the title defeating Lisa Raymond/Zhang Shuai in the final. At the Australian Open, Koukalová lost in the first round to 17th seed Sam Stosur.

In Paris at the indoor event, she was defeated in the second round by fourth seed and 2012 champion Angelique Kerber. During the Fed Cup tie against Spain, Koukalová won her first rubber over María Teresa Torró Flor, but she lost her second rubber to Carla Suárez Navarro. In the end, the Czech Republic defeated Spain 3–2. At the Qatar Ladies Open, she upset ninth seed Ana Ivanovic in the second round. She was defeated in the third round by sixth seed and eventual finalist Angelique Kerber. As the top seed at the first edition of the Rio Open, Koukalová made it to the final where she lost to fifth seed Kurumi Nara. Seeded third at the Brasil Tennis Cup, she won the tournament beating second seed Garbiñe Muguruza in the final; this was her third WTA singles title. Seeded 28th at the Indian Wells Open, Koukalová was defeated in the second round by compatriot Karolína Plíšková. Seeded 27th at the Miami Open, Koukalová lost her second-round match to Caroline Garcia. Seeded fifth at the Katowice Open, Koukalová made it to the quarterfinal round where she was defeated by fourth seed and eventual champion, Alizé Cornet. In doubles, she and Niculescu reached the final where they lost to the pair Yuliya Beygelzimer/Olga Savchuk.

Koukalová began her clay-court season at the Porsche Tennis Grand Prix where she lost in the first round to eighth seed Sara Errani. At the Madrid Open, she was defeated in the first round by eighth seed and eventual champion, Maria Sharapova. Seeded second at the Sparta Prague Open, she lost in the first round to eventual champion Heather Watson. Seeded third at the Nürnberger Versicherungscup, her final tournament before the French Open, she was defeated in the first round by Polona Hercog. Seeded 30th at the French Open, she lost in the first round to María Teresa Torró Flor.

Seeded sixth at the Birmingham Classic, Koukalová reached the quarterfinal round where she was defeated by top seed and eventual champion Ana Ivanovic. Seeded eighth at the Rosmalen Open, she advanced to the semifinal round where she lost to eventual champion CoCo Vandeweghe. Seeded 31st at Wimbledon, she was defeated in her second-round match by Madison Keys.

Seeded third at the first edition of the Bucharest Open, Koukalová lost in the first round to Monica Niculescu. Seeded third at the İstanbul Cup, she was defeated in the second round by Kristina Mladenovic.

In Montreal at the Rogers Cup, Koukalová lost in the second round to 11th seed and 2010 champion Caroline Wozniacki. At the Cincinnati Open, she was defeated in the first round by American qualifier Taylor Townsend. Competing at the Connecticut Open, Koukalová lost in the first round to sixth seed Flavia Pennetta. At the US Open, she was defeated in the first round by Petra Cetkovská.

Seeded third at the Korea Open, Koukalová lost in the second round to Maria Kirilenko. Playing at the first edition of the Wuhan Open, she was defeated in the first round by qualifier Zarina Diyas. In Beijing at the China Open, Koukalová lost again in the first round to Zarina Diyas. At the Generali Ladies Linz, Koukalová was defeated in the second round by Marina Erakovic. She played her final tournament of the season at the Kremlin Cup and retired during her first-round match against fifth seed Svetlana Kuznetsova due to illness.

Koukalová ended the year ranked 41.

=== 2015 ===
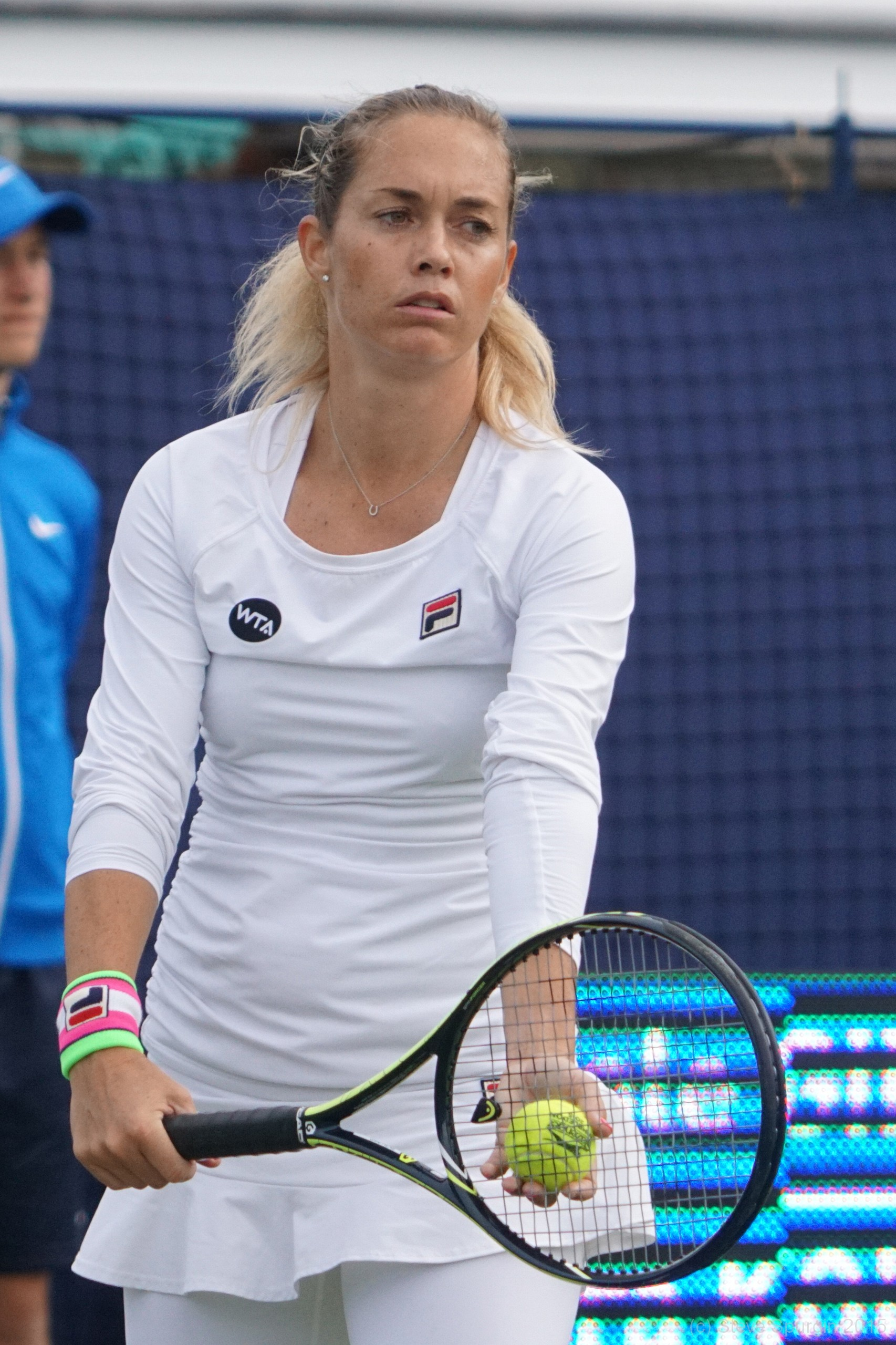
Koukalová at the 2015 Eastbourne International

Koukalová began the 2015 season at the Shenzhen Open. Seeded fifth, she lost in the first round to Anna Karolína Schmiedlová. After Shenzhen, she competed at the Hobart International where she was the sixth seed and last year finalist. Despite winning the first set 6-0, she was defeated in the first round by Kurumi Nara. At the Australian Open, she beat Australian wildcard Storm Sanders in the first round. In the second round, she fell to Julia Görges.

In Antwerp, Koukalová was eliminated in the first round by qualifier Francesca Schiavone. At the Dubai Championships, she lost in the first round to Tsvetana Pironkova. She fell in the first round of qualifying at the Qatar Open to Hsieh Su-wei. Seeded fifth at the Malaysian Open, she was defeated in the second round by Carina Witthöft. At the Indian Wells Open, she beat two-time champion Daniela Hantuchová in her first-round match. In the second round, she lost to 16th seed Madison Keys. At the Miami Open, she was beaten in the first round by Kristina Mladenovic. In Katowice, she lost her quarterfinals match to top seed and home crowd favorite, Agnieszka Radwańska.

Seeded third at the Slovak Open, she was defeated in the first round by eventual champion Danka Kovinić. At the Italian Open, Koukalová lost in the first round of qualifying to Anna Karolína Schmiedlová. In Germany at the Nürnberger Versicherungscup, Koukalová was defeated in the second round by second seed Angelique Kerber. Competing at the French Open, she lost in the first round to Danka Kovinić.

Beginning grass-court season at the Rosmalen Open, Koukalová was defeated in the second round by Annika Beck. Getting through the qualifying rounds at the Birmingham Classic, she lost in the third round to top seed Simona Halep. In Eastbourne, Koukalová was defeated in the final round of qualifying by Lauren Davis. At Wimbledon, she lost in the first round to Ajla Tomljanović.

In Contrexéville at the Lorraine Open 88, Koukalová was defeated in the first round by Kristína Kučová. At the Swedish Open, she was beaten in her quarterfinal match by Yulia Putintseva. Playing in Austria at the Gastein Ladies, Koukalová was defeated in the second round by second seed and eventual champion, Sam Stosur. Seeded third at the first edition of the Prague Open, she lost in the first round to Laura Pous Tió.

Playing in New York at the US Open, Koukalová was defeated in the first round by 19th seed Madison Keys.

Seeded fifth at the Open de Biarritz, she reached the semifinal round where she lost to sixth seed and eventual champion, Laura Siegemund. In Seoul at the Korea Open, Koukalová retired from her first-round match against Magdaléna Rybáriková due to injury. At the Tashkent Open, she was defeated in the first round by qualifier Kateryna Kozlova. Coming through qualifying at the Ladies Linz, Koukalová lost in the first round to Denisa Allertová. Entering the Kremlin Cup as a qualifier, she was defeated in the second round by eventual champion Svetlana Kuznetsova. Koukalová played her final tournament of the season at the Dubai Challenge. Seeded second, she made it to the final where she lost to sixth seed Çağla Büyükakçay.

Koukalová ended the year ranked 106.

=== 2016 ===
Koukalová started her 2016 season at the Hobart International. She lost in the first round of qualifying to Jana Fett. At the Australian Open, she was defeated in the first round by qualifier Nicole Gibbs.

Getting past qualifying at the St. Petersburg Trophy, Koukalová was eliminated in the first round by fifth seed Anastasia Pavlyuchenkova. In Doha, she was beaten in the first round of qualifying by Jana Čepelová. At the Malaysian Open, she lost in her first-round match to Naomi Broady. Playing at the Indian Wells Open, she was defeated in the first round of qualifying by Verónica Cepede Royg. Competing in Katowice, she fell in her first-round match to qualifier Ekaterina Alexandrova.

Beginning her clay-court season at the Porsche Tennis Grand Prix, Koukalová was beaten in the first round of qualifying by Laura Robson. At the Prague Open, she lost in the first round of qualifying to Amandine Hesse. At the French Open, she reached the final round of qualifying where she was defeated by Çağla Büyükakçay.

In the Birmingham, Koukalová was eliminated in the second round of qualifying by Kateryna Bondarenko. At Wimbledon, she lost in the first round of qualifying to Stephanie Vogt.

On 26 September, Koukalová announced her retirement from tennis.

== Personal life ==
On 6 June 2006, Klára married Czech footballer Jan Zakopal, but they divorced in January 2014. From June 2006 to March 2014, she used her married name Zakopalová while competing, switching back to Koukalová in April 2014.

== Performance timelines ==
Key
W	F	SF	QF	#R	RR	Q#	P#	DNQ	A	Z#	PO	G	S	B	NMS	NTI	P	NH

(W) winner; (F) finalist; (SF) semifinalist; (QF) quarterfinalist; (#R) rounds 4, 3, 2, 1; (RR) round-robin stage; (Q#) qualification round; (P#) preliminary round; (DNQ) did not qualify; (A) absent; (Z#) Davis/Fed Cup Zonal Group (with number indication) or (PO) play-off; (G) gold, (S) silver or (B) bronze Olympic/Paralympic medal; (NMS) not a Masters tournament; (NTI) not a Tier I tournament; (P) postponed; (NH) not held; (SR) strike rate (events won / competed); (W–L) win–loss record.
To avoid confusion and double counting, these charts are updated at the conclusion of a tournament or when the player's participation has ended.

Only main-draw results in WTA Tour, Grand Slam tournaments, Fed Cup, Hopman Cup and Olympic Games are included in win–loss records.

=== Singles ===
Tournament	2001	2002	2003	2004	2005	2006	2007	2008	2009	2010	2011	2012	2013	2014	2015	2016	SR	W–L	Win%
Grand Slam tournaments
Australian Open	Q1	Q2	3R	1R	2R	1R	1R	1R	1R	1R	2R	1R	2R	1R	2R	1R	0 / 14	6–14	30%
French Open	Q2	Q1	1R	2R	2R	1R	Q2	2R	1R	2R	1R	4R	1R	1R	1R	Q3	0 / 12	7–12	37%
Wimbledon	Q2	Q1	1R	2R	1R	1R	Q3	1R	1R	4R	3R	3R	3R	2R	1R	Q1	0 / 12	11–12	48%
US Open	Q1	Q1	1R	1R	1R	1R	1R	1R	Q3	1R	1R	1R	1R	1R	1R	A	0 / 12	0–12	0%
Win–Loss	0–0	0–0	3–4	2–4	2–4	0–4	0–2	1–4	0–3	4–4	3–4	5–4	3–4	1–4	1–4	0–1	0 / 50	24–50	32%
National representation
Summer Olympics	Not Held			1R	Not Held			1R	Not Held			1R	Not Held			A	0 / 3	0–3	0%
WTA Premier Mandatory & 5 + former^{†} tournaments
Dubai / Qatar Open (Note: The first Premier 5 event of the year has switched back and forth between the Dubai Tennis Championships and the Qatar Ladies Open since 2009. Dubai was classified as a Premier 5 event from 2009 to 2011 before being succeeded by Doha for the 2012–2014 period. In 2015, Dubai regained its Premier 5 status while Doha was demoted to Premier status. The Premier 5 tournaments were reclassified as WTA 1000 tournaments in 2021.)	Not Tier I							A	A	A	2R	1R	3R	3R	1R	Q1	0 / 5	3–5	38%
Indian Wells Open	A	Q1	2R	1R	A	2R	Q1	2R	1R	Q1	2R	4R	4R	2R	2R	Q1	0 / 10	7–10	41%
Miami Open	A	Q1	1R	2R	2R	3R	Q1	1R	1R	A	3R	1R	4R	2R	1R	A	0 / 11	5–11	31%
Berlin / Madrid Open (Note: In 2009, the German Open was replaced by the Madrid Open. The Premier Mandatory tournaments were reclassified as WTA 1000 tournaments in 2021.)	A	A	A	A	2R	2R	A	Q1	A	2R	1R	2R	1R	1R	A	A	0 / 7	4–7	36%
Italian Open	A	1R	2R	1R	A	1R	A	1R	A	A	A	A	A	A	Q1	A	0 / 5	1–5	17%
Canadian Open	A	A	A	A	A	A	A	A	A	2R	1R	A	2R	2R	A	A	0 / 4	3–4	43%
Cincinnati Open	Not Tier I								A	A	1R	1R	1R	1R	A	A	0 / 4	0–4	0%
Pan Pacific / Wuhan Open (Note: In 2014, the Pan Pacific Open was downgraded to a Premier event and replaced by the Wuhan Open. The Premier 5 tournaments were reclassified as WTA 1000 tournaments in 2021.)	A	A	A	A	A	2R	A	A	A	1R	3R	2R (Note: Withdrawal during the tournament. Not counted as a loss.)	1R	1R	A	A	0 / 6	4–5	44%
China Open	Not Tier I								A	1R	2R	A	1R	1R	A	A	0 / 4	1–4	20%
Charleston Open^{†}	Q1	A	A	A	3R	A	A	A	Not Tier I								0 / 1	2–1	67%
San Diego Open^{†}	A	A	A	A	2R	A	A	A	Not Held / Not Tier I								0 / 1	1–1	50%
Kremlin Cup^{†}	Q2	Q3	Q2	A	Q1	A	A	A	Not Tier I								0 / 0	0–0	–
Zurich Open^{†}	A	A	Q2	Q2	Q2	A	A	Not Held / Not Tier I									0 / 0	0–0	–
Win–Loss	0–0	0–1	1–3	1–3	4–4	3–5	0–0	1–3	0–2	1–4	5–8	4–5	7–8	3–8	1–3	0–0	0 / 58	31–57	35%
Career statistics
Tournaments	4	5	19	23	21	22	12	22	17	20	25	22	25	28	22	4	Career total: 291		
Titles	0	0	0	0	2	0	0	0	0	0	0	0	0	1	0	0	Career total: 3		
Finals	1	1	1	2	3	0	0	1	0	2	0	0	1	3	0	0	Career total: 15		
Year-end ranking	138	120	62	46	36	125	62	75	95	41	41	28	35	41	106	292	$4,084,344		

=== Doubles ===
Tournament	2005	2006	2007	2008	2009	2010	2011	2012	2013	2014	2015	SR	W–L	Win%
Australian Open	A	1R	A	2R	1R	A	2R	1R	1R	2R	1R	0 / 8	3–8	27%
French Open	1R	1R	A	1R	A	1R	2R	3R	1R	2R	1R	0 / 9	4–9	31%
Wimbledon	1R	1R	1R	1R	A	2R	2R	1R	1R	2R	1R	0 / 10	3–10	23%
US Open	1R	1R	1R	1R	A	2R	1R	2R	1R	3R	1R	0 / 10	4–10	29%
Win–Loss	0–3	0–4	0–2	1–4	0–1	2–3	3–4	3–4	0–4	5–4	0–4	0 / 37	14–37	27%

== WTA Tour finals ==
=== Singles: 15 (3 titles, 12 runner-ups) ===
Legend Tier III, IV & V / International (3–12)	Finals by surface Hard (2–3) Clay (0–7) Grass (1–1) Carpet (0–1)

Result	W–L	Date	Tournament	Tier	Surface	Opponent	Score
Loss	0–1	May 2001	Belgian Open, Belgium	Tier V	Clay	(Germany) Barbara Rittner	3–6, 2–6
Loss	0–2	Jul 2002	Morocco Open, Morocco	Tier V	Clay	(Austria) Patricia Wartusch	7–5, 3–6, 3–6
Loss	0–3	Aug 2003	Warsaw Open, Poland	Tier III	Clay	(Israel) Anna Smashnova	2–6, 0–6
Loss	0–4	Jun 2004	Rosmalen Open, Netherlands	Tier III	Grass	(France) Mary Pierce	6–7^{(6–8)}, 2–6
Loss	0–5	Aug 2004	Warsaw Open, Poland (2)	Tier III	Clay	(Italy) Flavia Pennetta	5–7, 6–3, 3–6
Win	1–5	Jun 2005	Rosmalen Open, Netherlands	Tier III	Grass	(Czech Republic) Lucie Šafářová	3–6, 6–2, 6–2
Loss	1–6	July 2005	Palermo Open, Italy	Tier IV	Clay	(Spain) Anabel Medina Garrigues	4–6, 0–6
Win	2–6	Sep 2005	Slovenia Open, Slovenia	Tier IV	Hard	(Slovenia) Katarina Srebotnik	6–2, 4–6, 6–3
Loss	2–7	Feb 2008	Cachantún Cup, Chile	Tier III	Clay	(Italy) Flavia Pennetta	4–6, 4–5 ret.
Loss	2–8	Aug 2010	Danish Open, Denmark	International	Carpet (i)	(Denmark) Caroline Wozniacki	2–6, 6–7^{(5–7)}
Loss	2–9	Sep 2010	Korea Open, South Korea	International	Hard	(Russia) Alisa Kleybanova	1–6, 3–6
Loss	2–10	Jan 2013	Shenzhen Open, China	International	Hard	(China) Li Na	3–6, 6–1, 5–7
Loss	2–11	Jan 2014	Hobart International, Australia	International	Hard	(Spain) Garbiñe Muguruza	4–6, 0–6
Loss	2–12	Feb 2014	Rio Open, Brazil	International	Clay	(Japan) Kurumi Nara	1–6, 6–4, 1–6
Win	3–12	Mar 2014	Brasil Tennis Cup, Brazil	International	Hard	(Spain) Garbiñe Muguruza	4–6, 7–5, 6–0

=== Doubles: 10 (4 titles, 6 runner-ups) ===
Legend Premier (0–2) Tier III / International (4–4)	Finals by surface Hard (2–4) Clay (1–1) Grass (1–1)

Result	W–L	Date	Tournament	Tier	Surface	Partner	Opponents	Score
Loss	0–1	Sep 2001	Tournoi de Québec, Canada	Tier III	Carpet (i)	(Czech Republic) Alena Vašková	(United States) Samantha Reeves (Italy) Adriana Serra Zanetti	5–7, 6–4, 3–6
Loss	0–2	Jul 2009	Slovenia Open, Slovenia	International	Hard	(France) Camille Pin	(Germany) Julia Görges (Czech Republic) Vladimíra Uhlířová	4–6, 2–6
Loss	0–3	Oct 2009	Kremlin Cup, Russia	Premier	Hard (i)	(Russia) Maria Kondratieva	(Russia) Maria Kirilenko (Russia) Nadia Petrova	2–6, 2–6
Win	1–3	Jun 2011	Rosmalen Open, Netherlands	International	Grass	(Czech Republic) Barbora Záhlavová-Strýcová	(Slovakia) Dominika Cibulková (Italy) Flavia Pennetta	1–6, 6–4, [10–7]
Loss	1–4	Jul 2011	Palermo Ladies Open, Italy	International	Clay	(Czech Republic) Andrea Hlaváčková	(Italy) Sara Errani (Italy) Roberta Vinci	5–7, 1–6
Loss	1–5	Jun 2013	Eastbourne International, United Kingdom	Premier	Grass	(Romania) Monica Niculescu	(Russia) Nadia Petrova (Slovenia) Katarina Srebotnik	3–6, 3–6
Win	2–5	Jul 2013	Swedish Open, Sweden	International	Clay	(Spain) Anabel Medina Garrigues	(Romania) Alexandra Dulgheru (Italy) Flavia Pennetta	6–1, 6–4
Win	3–5	Jan 2014	Shenzhen Open, China	International	Hard	(Romania) Monica Niculescu	(Ukraine) Lyudmyla Kichenok (Ukraine) Nadiia Kichenok	6–3, 6–4
Win	4–5	Jan 2014	Hobart International, Australia	International	Hard	(Romania) Monica Niculescu	(United States) Lisa Raymond (China) Zhang Shuai	6–2, 6–7^{(5–7)}, [10–8]
Loss	4–6	Apr 2014	Katowice Open, Poland	International	Hard (i)	(Romania) Monica Niculescu	(Ukraine) Yuliya Beygelzimer (Ukraine) Olga Savchuk	4–6, 7–5, [7–10]

== ITF Circuit finals ==
=== Singles: 12 (7 titles, 5 runner–ups) ===
Legend
100K tournaments (1–2)
75K tournaments (0–2)
50K tournaments (3–0)
25K tournaments (2–0)
10K tournaments (1–1)

Result	W–L	Date	Tournament	Tier	Surface	Opponent	Score
Win	1–0	Jul 1999	ITF Alkmaar, Netherlands	10K	Clay	(United States) Janet Bergman	6–2, 6–1
Loss	1–1	Feb 2000	ITF Pécs, Hungary	10K	Clay	(Czech Republic) Petra Raclavská	4–6, 6–7^{(4–7)}
Win	2–1	Jun 2000	ITF Sopot, Poland	25K	Clay	(Germany) Syna Schreiber	7–6^{(9–7)}, 6–3
Win	3–1	Aug 2000	ITF Maribor, Slovenia	25K	Clay	(Germany) Angelika Rösch	7–5, 6–4
Win	4–1	Jun 2001	Open de Marseille, France	50K	Clay	(Slovakia) Karina Habšudová	6–4, 4–6, 7–6^{(7–3)}
Win	5–1	Jun 2002	ITF Caserta, Italy	50K	Clay	(Argentina) Mariana Díaz Oliva	7–6^{(7–4)}, 5–7, 7–5
Loss	5–2	Jun 2007	Zubr Cup, Czech Republic	75K	Clay	(Germany) Angelique Kerber	3–6, 6–1, 5–7
Win	6–2	Jun 2007	Zlín Open, Czech Republic	50K	Clay	(Czech Republic) Petra Kvitová	6–4, 6–1
Loss	6–3	Oct 2009	Internazionali di Ortisei, Italy	100K	Carpet	(Czech Republic) Barbora Strýcová	6–7^{(4–7)}, 3–6
Loss	6–4	May 2012	ITF Prague Open, Czech Republic	100K	Clay	(Czech Republic) Lucie Šafářová	3–6, 5–7
Win	7–4	Jun 2010	Open de Marseille, France	100K	Clay	(Sweden) Johanna Larsson	6–3, 6–3
Loss	7–5	Nov 2015	Dubai Tennis Challenge, UAE	75K	Hard	(Turkey) Çağla Büyükakçay	7–6^{(7–4)}, 4–6, 4–6

== Wins against top 10 players ==
No.	Player	Rk	Event	Surface	Rd	Score	Rk	Years	Ref
1	(United States) Monica Seles	7	Australian Open, Australia	Hard	2R	6–7^{(6–8)}, 7–5, 6–3		2003	
2	(United States) Serena Williams	1	Andalucia Experience, Spain	Clay	1R	6–4, 3–6, 6–1		2009	
3	(Russia) Dinara Safina	5	Madrid Open, Spain	Clay	1R	7–6^{(7–1)}, 7–6^{(7–3)}		2010	
4	(Italy) Flavia Pennetta	10	Wimbledon Championships, United Kingdom	Grass	3R	6–2, 6–3		2010	
5	(China) Na Li	7	Qatar Open, Qatar	Hard	2R	6–2, 6–1		2011	

- Key: (Rk) first use, opponent rank; (Rd) round; (Rk) 2nd use, player rank; (Ref) reference; (F) final; (SF) semifinal; (QF) quarterfinal; (#R) rounds 4, 3, 2, 1; (RR) round-robin stage; (Q#) qualifying rounds or stages (3), 2, 1.
