= 2000 Heineken Trophy =

- Date: 19–25 June
- Edition: 11th
- Surface: Grass / outdoor
- Location: Rosmalen, 's-Hertogenbosch, Netherlands

Champions

Men's singles
- (Australia) Patrick Rafter

Women's singles
- (Switzerland) Martina Hingis

Men's doubles
- (Czech Republic) Martin Damm / (Czech Republic) Cyril Suk

Women's doubles
- (United States) Erika deLone / (Australia) Nicole Pratt
← 1999 ·	Heineken Trophy	· 2001 →

The 2000 Heineken Trophy was a tennis tournament played on outdoor grass courts at Autotron park in Rosmalen, 's-Hertogenbosch, Netherlands that was part of the International Series of the 2000 ATP Tour and Tier III of the 2000 WTA Tour. It was the 11th edition of the tournament and was held from 19 June until 25 June 2000. Patrick Rafter and Martina Hingis won the singles titles.

== Finals ==
=== Men's singles ===
(Australia) Patrick Rafter defeated (France) Nicolas Escudé 6–1, 6–3

=== Women's singles ===
(Switzerland) Martina Hingis defeated (Romania) Ruxandra Dragomir 6–2, 3–0 ret.

- It was Brandi's only singles title.

=== Men's doubles ===
(Czech Republic) Martin Damm / (Czech Republic) Cyril Suk defeated (Netherlands) Paul Haarhuis / (Australia) Sandon Stolle 6–4, 6–7^{(5–7)}, 7–6^{(7–5)}

=== Women's doubles ===
(United States) Erika deLone / (Australia) Nicole Pratt defeated (Australia) Catherine Barclay / (Slovakia) Karina Habšudová, 7–6^{(8–6)}, 4–3 ret.
