= 1996 Continental Championships – Doubles =

Doubles
- 1996 Continental Championships (tennis)
- 1995 Champion: (Netherlands) Richard Krajicek (Netherlands) Jan Siemerink

Final
- Champion: (Australia) Paul Kilderry (Czech Republic) Pavel Vízner
- Runner-up: (Sweden) Anders Järryd (Canada) Daniel Nestor
- Score: 7–5, 6–3

Events
| Singles | Doubles |
| ← 1995 · | Continental Championships (tennis) | · 1997 → |

Richard Krajicek and Jan Siemerink were the defending champions but lost in the first round to Kenneth Carlsen and Frederik Fetterlein.

Paul Kilderry and Pavel Vízner won in the final 7–5, 6–3 against Anders Järryd and Daniel Nestor.

== Seeds ==
Champion seeds are indicated in bold text while text in italics indicates the round in which those seeds were eliminated.

1. (Zimbabwe) Byron Black / (Canada) Grant Connell (first round)
2. (Netherlands) Hendrik Jan Davids / (Czech Republic) Cyril Suk (first round)
3. (Switzerland) Jakob Hlasek / (Germany) David Prinosil (first round)
4. (Netherlands) Paul Haarhuis / (Netherlands) Sjeng Schalken (semifinals)

== Draw ==
=== Key ===
- Q = Qualifier
- WC = Wild card
- LL = Lucky loser
- Alt = Alternate
- SE = Special exempt
- PR = Protected ranking
- ITF = ITF entry
- JE = Junior exempt
- w/o = Walkover
- r = Retired
- d = Defaulted
- SR = Special ranking

First round
1 | (Zimbabwe) B Black (Canada) G Connell | **6** | 5 | 3
(Australia) **P Kilderry** (Czech Republic) **P Vízner** | 4 | **7** | **6**
WC | (Netherlands) **S Noteboom** (Netherlands) **F Wibier** | **6** | **6**
(United States) J Belloli (India) L Paes | 2 | 4
4 | (Netherlands) **P Haarhuis** (Netherlands) **S Schalken** | **6** | **6**
LL | (Finland) T Ketola (Belarus) M Mirnyi | 4 | 4
(United States) **J Tarango** (United States) **K Thorne** | 4 | **6** | **7**
Q | (France) S Simian (Germany) A Thoms | **6** | 4 | 5
(Sweden) **A Järryd** (Canada) **D Nestor** | **6** | **6**
(South Africa) J-L de Jager (New Zealand) B Steven | 4 | 4
(United States) **J Grabb** (United States) **R Reneberg** | 6 | **6** | **6**
3 | (Switzerland) J Hlasek (Germany) D Prinosil | **7** | 3 | 2
(Netherlands) R Krajicek (Netherlands) J Siemerink | 6 | **7** | 6
WC | (Denmark) **K Carlsen** (Denmark) **F Fetterlein** | **7** | 5 | **7**
(Netherlands) **T Kempers** (Netherlands) **T Nijssen** | **6** | **7**
2 | (Netherlands) H J Davids (Czech Republic) C Suk | 4 | 6

Quarterfinals
(Australia) **P Kilderry** (Czech Republic) **P Vízner** | 3 | **7** | **7**
WC | (Netherlands) S Noteboom (Netherlands) F Wibier | **6** | 5 | 6
4 | (Netherlands) **P Haarhuis** (Netherlands) **S Schalken** | **7** | **6**
(United States) J Tarango (United States) K Thorne | 6 | 2
(Sweden) **A Järryd** (Canada) **D Nestor** | **6** | **6**
(United States) J Grabb (United States) R Reneberg | 3 | 4
WC | (Denmark) **K Carlsen** (Denmark) **F Fetterlein** | 3 | **6** | **6**
(Netherlands) T Kempers (Netherlands) T Nijssen | **6** | 3 | 3

Semifinals
(Australia) **P Kilderry** (Czech Republic) **P Vízner** | 3 | **6** | **7**
4 | (Netherlands) P Haarhuis (Netherlands) S Schalken | **6** | 3 | 6
(Sweden) **A Järryd** (Canada) **D Nestor** | **6** | **6**
WC | (Denmark) K Carlsen (Denmark) F Fetterlein | 3 | 3

Final
(Australia) **Paul Kilderry** (Czech Republic) **Pavel Vízner** | **7** | **6**
(Sweden) Anders Järryd (Canada) Daniel Nestor | 5 | 3
