= 1997 Heineken Trophy – Women's singles =

Women's singles
- 1997 Heineken Trophy
- 1996 Champion: (Germany) Anke Huber

Final
- Champion: (Romania) Ruxandra Dragomir
- Runner-up: (Netherlands) Miriam Oremans
- Score: 5–7, 6–2, 6–4

Details
- Draw: 30
- Seeds: 8

Events
Singles	men	women
Doubles	men	women
← 1996 ·	Heineken Trophy	· 1998 →

Anke Huber was the defending champion but lost in the semifinals to Miriam Oremans.

Ruxandra Dragomir won in the final 5–7, 6–2, 6–4 against Oremans.

== Seeds ==
A champion seed is indicated in bold text while text in italics indicates the round in which that seed was eliminated. The top two seeds received a bye to the second round.

1. (Germany) Anke Huber (semifinals)
2. (France) Mary Pierce (quarterfinals)
3. (Romania) **Ruxandra Dragomir (champion)**
4. (Slovakia) Karina Habšudová (quarterfinals)
5. (Belgium) Sabine Appelmans (quarterfinals)
6. (Belgium) Dominique Van Roost (quarterfinals)
7. (Switzerland) Patty Schnyder (first round)
8. (Sweden) Åsa Carlsson (semifinals)

== Draw ==
=== Key ===
- Q = Qualifier
- WC = Wild card
- LL = Lucky loser
- Alt = Alternate
- ITF = ITF entry
- PR = Protected ranking
- SR = Special ranking
- SE = Special exempt
- JE = Junior exempt
- JR = Junior Accelerator Programme entrant
- CO = College Accelerator Programme entrant
- NG = Next Gen Accelerator Program entrant
- w/o = Walkover
- r = Retired
- d = Defaulted

=== Final ===
Final
	(Netherlands) Miriam Oremans	**7**	2	4
3	(Romania) **Ruxandra Dragomir**	5	**6**	**6**

=== Top half ===
First round
(Czech Republic) D Chládková	6	4
(Czech Republic) **S Kleinová**	**7**	**6**
WC	(France) N van Lottum	6	5
(Argentina) **F Labat**	**7**	**7**
(Czech Republic) A Gerši	4	4
5	(Belgium) **S Appelmans**	**6**	**6**
4	(Slovakia) **K Habšudová**	**6**	**6**
Q	(Germany) J Kandarr	3	4
(Canada) **P Hy-Boulais**	**6**	4	**6**
(Japan) Y Yoshida	1	**6**	3
(Bulgaria) **M Maleeva**	**6**	**6**
Q	(Belgium) S Devillé	2	1
(Netherlands) **M Oremans**	**7**	**6**
7	(Switzerland) P Schnyder	5	2

Second round
1	(Germany) **A Huber**	**6**	2	**6**
(Czech Republic) S Kleinová	4	**6**	4
(Argentina) F Labat	5	5
5	(Belgium) **S Appelmans**	**7**	**7**
4	(Slovakia) **K Habšudová**	2	**7**	**6**
(Canada) P Hy-Boulais	**6**	5	4
(Bulgaria) M Maleeva	4	5
(Netherlands) **M Oremans**	**6**	**7**

Quarterfinals
1	(Germany) **A Huber**	**6**	4	**7**
5	(Belgium) S Appelmans	2	**6**	6
4	(Slovakia) K Habšudová	2	5
(Netherlands) **M Oremans**	**6**	**7**

Semifinals
1	(Germany) A Huber	**6**	4	r
(Netherlands) **M Oremans**	4	**6**

=== Bottom half ===
First round
6	(Belgium) **D Van Roost**	**7**	**6**
(United States) L Wild	6	2
(Netherlands) **K Boogert**	**4**
(Latvia) L Neiland	2	r
WC	(Poland) A Olsza	0	3
(Germany) **B Rittner**	**6**	**6**
(Thailand) T Tanasugarn	3	1
3	(Romania) **R Dragomir**	**6**	**6**
8	(Sweden) **Å Carlsson**	**6**	3	**7**
Q	(Spain) C Torrens Valero	3	**6**	5
(Czech Republic) P Langrová	2	4
Q	(Italy) **F Lubiani**	**6**	**6**
(France) **S Pitkowski**	**6**	3	**6**
(Belgium) E Callens	1	**6**	0

Second round
6	(Belgium) **D Van Roost**	2	**6**	**6**
(Netherlands) K Boogert	**6**	3	4
(Germany) B Rittner	1	0	r
3	(Romania) **R Dragomir**	**6**	**2**
8	(Sweden) **Å Carlsson**	6	**6**	**7**
Q	(Italy) F Lubiani	**7**	2	5
(France) S Pitkowski	3	5
2	(France) **M Pierce**	**6**	**7**

Quarterfinals
6	(Belgium) D Van Roost	1	**6**	4
3	(Romania) **R Dragomir**	**6**	2	**6**
8	(Sweden) **Å Carlsson**	**w/o**
2	(France) M Pierce

Semifinals
3	(Romania) **R Dragomir**	**6**	**6**
8	(Sweden) Å Carlsson	4	2
