= 1997 Heineken Trophy – Men's singles =

Men's singles
- 1997 Heineken Trophy

Final
- Champion: (Netherlands) Richard Krajicek
- Runner-up: (France) Guillaume Raoux
- Score: 6–4, 7–6^{(9–7)}

Events
Singles	men	women
Doubles	men	women
← 1996 ·	Heineken Trophy	· 1998 →

Richey Reneberg was the defending champion, but lost in the first round this year.

Richard Krajicek won the tournament, beating Guillaume Raoux in the final, 6–4, 7–6^{(9–7)}.

== Seeds ==
1. (United States) Michael Chang (semifinals)
2. (Austria) Thomas Muster (first round)
3. (Netherlands) Richard Krajicek (champion)
4. (Sweden) Jonas Björkman (final)
5. (Switzerland) Marc Rosset (first round)
6. (Sweden) Magnus Gustafsson (second round)
7. (Sweden) Thomas Johansson (first round)
8. (Spain) Francisco Clavet (quarterfinals)

== Draw ==
=== Key ===
- Q = Qualifier
- WC = Wild card
- LL = Lucky loser
- Alt = Alternate
- SE = Special exempt
- PR = Protected ranking
- ITF = ITF entry
- JE = Junior exempt
- w/o = Walkover
- r = Retired
- d = Defaulted
- SR = Special ranking

=== Finals ===
Semifinals
1	(United States) Michael Chang	7^{7}	3	4
3	(Netherlands) Richard Krajicek	6^{5}	6	6
4	(Sweden) Jonas Björkman	0	1
Q	(France) Guillaume Raoux	6	6

Final
3	(Netherlands) Richard Krajicek	6	7^{9}
Q	(France) Guillaume Raoux	4	6^{7}

=== Top half ===
First round
1	(United States) M Chang	4	6	6
(France) F Santoro	6	4	3
(France) C Pioline	3	6	5
(Germany) A Rădulescu	6	3	7
(Morocco) H Arazi	2	7	6
Q	(United States) V Spadea	6	5	3
WC	(Netherlands) J Eltingh	6^{8}	3
8	(Spain) F Clavet	7^{10}	6
3	(Netherlands) R Krajicek	7	7^{7}
(Netherlands) P Haarhuis	5	6^{4}
(Germany) H Dreekmann	5	7^{8}	7
(Czech Republic) S Doseděl	7	6^{6}	5
(United States) C Woodruff	6	6
WC	(Netherlands) D van Scheppingen	4	0
(Czech Republic) M Damm	6	7^{7}
5	(Switzerland) M Rosset	1	6^{5}

Second round
1	(United States) M Chang	7^{7}	6
(Germany) A Rădulescu	6^{5}	1
(Morocco) H Arazi	3	6	1
8	(Spain) F Clavet	6	0	6
3	(Netherlands) R Krajicek	6	6
(Germany) H Dreekmann	0	3
(United States) C Woodruff	1	7^{7}	1
(Czech Republic) M Damm	6	6^{3}	6

Quarterfinals
1	(United States) M Chang	6^{5}	7^{10}	6
8	(Spain) F Clavet	7^{7}	6^{8}	1
3	(Netherlands) R Krajicek	7^{7}	7^{7}
(Czech Republic) M Damm	6^{2}	6^{4}

Semifinals
1	(United States) M Chang	7^{7}	3	4
3	(Netherlands) R Krajicek	6^{5}	6	6

=== Bottom half ===
First round
6	(Sweden) M Gustafsson	3	6	7
(Slovakia) D Hrbatý	6	3	5
Q	(Netherlands) F Wibier	6	6
(Spain) E Benfele Álvarez	3	4
(Czech Republic) D Vacek	7	1
(United States) R Reneberg	5	0^{r}
(Slovakia) J Krošlák	7	5	1
4	(Sweden) J Björkman	5	7	6
7	(Sweden) T Johansson	0	6^{5}
(Netherlands) S Schalken	6	7^{7}
(Sweden) N Kulti	7^{7}	3	4
Q	(India) L Paes	6^{3}	6	6
WC	(Belarus) V Voltchkov	5	3
Q	(France) G Raoux	7	6
SE	(Morocco) K Alami	6	6
2	(Austria) T Muster	4	2

Second round
6	(Sweden) M Gustafsson	6^{5}	6^{3}
Q	(Netherlands) F Wibier	7^{7}	7^{7}
(Czech Republic) D Vacek	1	2
4	(Sweden) J Björkman	6	6
(Netherlands) S Schalken	6	6
Q	(India) L Paes	2	2
Q	(France) G Raoux	6	2	7^{7}
SE	(Morocco) K Alami	4	6	6^{4}

Quarterfinals
Q	(Netherlands) F Wibier	2	4
4	(Sweden) J Björkman	6	6
(Netherlands) S Schalken	6^{5}	4
Q	(France) G Raoux	7^{7}	6

Semifinals
4	(Sweden) J Björkman	0	1
Q	(France) G Raoux	6	6
