= 1997 Heineken Trophy – Women's doubles =

Women's doubles
- 1997 Heineken Trophy
- 1996 Champions: (Latvia) Larisa Neiland (Netherlands) Brenda Schultz-McCarthy

Final
- Champions: (Czech Republic) Eva Melicharová (Czech Republic) Helena Vildová
- Runners-up: (Slovakia) Karina Habšudová (Argentina) Florencia Labat
- Score: 6–3, 7–6^{(8–6)}

Details
- Draw: 16
- Seeds: 4

Events
Singles	men	women
Doubles	men	women
← 1996 ·	Heineken Trophy	· 1998 →

Larisa Neiland and Brenda Schultz-McCarthy were the defending champions but only Neiland competed that year with Ruxandra Dragomir.

Dragomir and Neiland lost in the quarterfinals to Eva Melicharová and Helena Vildová.

Melicharová and Vildová won in the final 6–3, 7–6^{(8–6)} against Karina Habšudová and Florencia Labat.

== Seeds ==
Champion seeds are indicated in bold text while text in italics indicates the round in which those seeds were eliminated.

1. (Romania) Ruxandra Dragomir / (Latvia) Larisa Neiland (quarterfinals)
2. (Belgium) Sabine Appelmans / (Netherlands) Miriam Oremans (first round)
3. (Netherlands) Kristie Boogert / (United States) Linda Wild (semifinals)
4. (Germany) Anke Huber / (France) Mary Pierce (semifinals)

== Draw ==
=== Key ===
- Q = Qualifier
- WC = Wild card
- LL = Lucky loser
- Alt = Alternate
- ITF = ITF entry
- PR = Protected ranking
- SR = Special ranking
- SE = Special exempt
- JE = Junior exempt
- JR = Junior Accelerator Programme entrant
- CO = College Accelerator Programme entrant
- NG = Next Gen Accelerator Program entrant
- w/o = Walkover
- r = Retired
- d = Defaulted

First round
1	(Romania) **R Dragomir** (Latvia) **L Neiland**	**w/o**
(Germany) B Rittner (Belgium) D Van Roost
(Czech Republic) **E Melicharová** (Czech Republic) **H Vildová**	**6**	**6**
(Romania) C Cristea (France) S Pitkowski	1	2
4	(Germany) **A Huber** (France) **M Pierce**	**6**	**6**
(Czech Republic) P Langrová (Switzerland) P Schnyder	3	3
WC	(Netherlands) F Joosten (Netherlands) A Mikkers	1	1
(Poland) **A Olsza** (Japan) **Y Yoshida**	**6**	**6**
(Czech Republic) D Chládková (Czech Republic) S Kleinová	**6**	4	3
(Belgium) **S Devillé** (Germany) **J Kandarr**	0	**6**	**6**
(Sweden) Å Carlsson (Canada) P Hy-Boulais	**6**	3	3
3	(Netherlands) **K Boogert** (United States) **L Wild**	4	**6**	**6**
(Australia) **D Jones** (Thailand) **T Tanasugarn**	5	**7**	**6**
(Belgium) E Callens (Belgium) L Courtois	**7**	5	3
(Slovakia) **K Habšudová** (Argentina) **F Labat**	**7**	**6**
2	(Belgium) S Appelmans (Netherlands) M Oremans	5	4

Quarterfinals
1	(Romania) R Dragomir (Latvia) L Neiland	**6**	3	5
(Czech Republic) **E Melicharová** (Czech Republic) **H Vildová**	3	**6**	**7**
4	(Germany) **A Huber** (France) **M Pierce**	**7**	**6**
(Poland) A Olsza (Japan) Y Yoshida	5	3
(Belgium) S Devillé (Germany) J Kandarr	4	4
3	(Netherlands) **K Boogert** (United States) **L Wild**	**6**	**6**
(Australia) D Jones (Thailand) T Tanasugarn	**6**	6	1
(Slovakia) **K Habšudová** (Argentina) **F Labat**	2	**7**	**6**

Semifinals
(Czech Republic) **E Melicharová** (Czech Republic) **H Vildová**	**w/o**
4	(Germany) A Huber (France) M Pierce
3	(Netherlands) K Boogert (United States) L Wild	1	**7**	5
(Slovakia) **K Habšudová** (Argentina) **F Labat**	**6**	5	**7**

Final
(Czech Republic) **Eva Melicharová** (Czech Republic) **Helena Vildová**	**6**	**7^{8}**
(Slovakia) Karina Habšudová (Argentina) Florencia Labat	3	6^{6}
