= 2000 Heineken Trophy – Men's doubles =

Men's doubles
- 2000 Heineken Trophy

Final
- Champions: (Czech Republic) Martin Damm (Czech Republic) Cyril Suk
- Runners-up: (Netherlands) Paul Haarhuis (Australia) Sandon Stolle
- Score: 6–4, 6–7^{(5–7)}, 7–6^{(7–5)}

Details
- Draw: 16 (1 Q / 3 WC )
- Seeds: 4

Events
Singles	men	women
Doubles	men	women
← 1999 ·	Heineken Trophy	· 2001 →

Since the 1999 final was cancelled due to rain, no defending champions were declared.

Guillaume Raoux and Jan Siemerink were the 1998 champions, but Raoux did not compete this year. Siemerink teamed up with Sjeng Schalken and lost in first round to Andrei Pavel and Gabriel Trifu.

Martin Damm and Cyril Suk won the title by defeating Paul Haarhuis and Sandon Stolle 6–4, 6–7^{(5–7)}, 7–6^{(7–5)} in the final.

== Seeds ==
1. (Netherlands) Paul Haarhuis / (Australia) Sandon Stolle (final)
2. (Czech Republic) Martin Damm / (Czech Republic) Cyril Suk (champions)
3. (Australia) Andrew Florent / (Australia) Peter Tramacchi (quarterfinals)
4. (Czech Republic) Petr Pála / (Czech Republic) David Rikl (semifinals)

== Draw ==
=== Key ===
- Q = Qualifier
- WC = Wild card
- LL = Lucky loser
- Alt = Alternate
- ITF = ITF entry
- PR = Protected ranking
- SR = Special ranking
- SE = Special exempt
- JE = Junior exempt
- JR = Junior Accelerator Programme entrant
- CO = College Accelerator Programme entrant
- NG = Next Gen Accelerator Program entrant
- w/o = Walkover
- r = Retired
- d = Defaulted

=== Draw ===
First round
1	(Netherlands) P Haarhuis (Australia) S Stolle	6	7^{7}
(France) J Boutter (North Macedonia) A Kitinov	3	6^{2}
WC	(Netherlands) S Schalken (Netherlands) J Siemerink	6^{14}	3
Q	(Romania) A Pavel (Romania) G Trifu	7^{16}	6
3	(Australia) A Florent (Australia) P Tramacchi	4	7^{7}	7^{7}
(Italy) M Bertolini (Italy) C Brandi	6	6^{5}	6^{5}
WC	(Italy) L Tieleman (Netherlands) J van Lottum	7^{7}	6^{6}	6
WC	(Netherlands) R Sluiter (Netherlands) P Wessels	6^{4}	7^{8}	3
(United States) D Bowen (United States) B Coupe	7^{7}	4	5
(Japan) T Shimada (South Africa) M Wakefield	6^{4}	6	7
(Spain) JI Carrasco (Spain) J Velasco Jr.	3	4
4	(Czech Republic) P Pála (Czech Republic) D Rikl	6	6
(Sweden) F Bergh (Sweden) P Nyborg	4	3
(Portugal) N Marques (Belgium) T Vanhoudt	6	6
(Czech Republic) P Vízner (United States) J Waite	6^{4}	6^{1}
2	(Czech Republic) M Damm (Czech Republic) C Suk	7^{7}	7^{7}

Quarterfinals
1	(Netherlands) P Haarhuis (Australia) S Stolle	6	6^{7}	7
Q	(Romania) A Pavel (Romania) G Trifu	3	7^{9}	5
3	(Australia) A Florent (Australia) P Tramacchi	6	4	3
WC	(Italy) L Tieleman (Netherlands) J van Lottum	4	6	6
(Japan) T Shimada (South Africa) M Wakefield	6	4	6^{2}
4	(Czech Republic) P Pála (Czech Republic) D Rikl	3	6	7^{7}
(Portugal) N Marques (Belgium) T Vanhoudt	4	4
2	(Czech Republic) M Damm (Czech Republic) C Suk	6	6

Semifinals
1	(Netherlands) P Haarhuis (Australia) S Stolle	6	6
WC	(Italy) L Tieleman (Netherlands) J van Lottum	3	4
4	(Czech Republic) P Pála (Czech Republic) D Rikl	4	2
2	(Czech Republic) M Damm (Czech Republic) C Suk	6	6

Final
1	(Netherlands) P Haarhuis (Australia) S Stolle	4	7^{7}	6^{5}
2	(Czech Republic) M Damm (Czech Republic) C Suk	6	6^{5}	7^{7}
