= 1996 Continental Championships – Singles =

Singles
- 1996 Continental Championships (tennis)
- 1995 Champion: (Slovakia) Karol Kučera

Final
- Champion: (United States) Richey Reneberg
- Runner-up: (France) Stéphane Simian
- Score: 6–4, 6–0

Events
Singles	Doubles
← 1995 ·	Continental Championships (tennis)	· 1997 →

Karol Kučera was the defending champion but did not compete that year.

Richey Reneberg won in the final 6–4, 6–0 against Stéphane Simian.

== Seeds ==
A champion seed is indicated in bold text while text in italics indicates the round in which that seed was eliminated.

1. (France) Arnaud Boetsch (first round)
2. (Spain) Albert Costa (first round)
3. (Netherlands) Richard Krajicek (quarterfinals)
4. (Zimbabwe) Byron Black (first round)
5. (Netherlands) Jan Siemerink (quarterfinals)
6. (Netherlands) Paul Haarhuis (semifinals)
7. (Australia) Mark Philippoussis (first round)
8. (United States) **Richey Reneberg (champions)**

== Draw ==
=== Key ===
- Q = Qualifier
- WC = Wild card
- LL = Lucky loser
- Alt = Alternate
- SE = Special exempt
- PR = Protected ranking
- ITF = ITF entry
- JE = Junior exempt
- w/o = Walkover
- r = Retired
- d = Defaulted
- SR = Special ranking

First round
1	(France) A Boetsch	3	2
(France) **S Simian**	**6**	**6**
(Slovakia) **J Krošlák**	**6**	**6**
(France) J Golmard	2	3
(United States) J Tarango	5	6^{5}
(India) **L Paes**	**7**	**7^{7}**
(Canada) **D Nestor**	**6**	**7^{9}**
7	(Australia) M Philippoussis	4	6^{7}
3	(Netherlands) **R Krajicek**	**7^{7}**	**7^{14}**
(Netherlands) J Eltingh	6^{5}	6^{12}
Q	(Netherlands) **H J Davids**	**7**	**6**
(Germany) D Prinosil	5	3
WC	(France) H Leconte	5	2
(Denmark) **K Carlsen**	**7**	**6**
Q	(United States) K Thorne	2	**6**	1
6	(Netherlands) **P Haarhuis**	**6**	3	**6**
5	(Netherlands) **J Siemerink**	**6**	**6**
(Germany) B Karbacher	2	4
(New Zealand) **B Steven**	**6**	**7**
Q	(Belarus) M Mirnyi	2	5
WC	(Netherlands) P Wessels	2	3
(Sweden) **J Björkman**	**6**	**6**
(Netherlands) **S Schalken**	**6**	**7^{7}**
4	(Zimbabwe) B Black	3	6^{1}
8	(United States) **R Reneberg**	**7^{8}**	**6**
(Sweden) A Järryd	6^{6}	3
(Switzerland) **J Hlasek**	**6**	**7^{7}**
WC	(Netherlands) R Sluiter	2	6^{5}
Q	(Netherlands) S Groen	6^{4}	4
(Denmark) **F Fetterlein**	**7^{7}**	**6**
(Morocco) **H Arazi**	1	**7^{7}**	**7^{9}**
2	(Spain) A Costa	**6**	6^{5}	6^{7}

Second round
(France) **S Simian**	**6**	**6**
(Slovakia) J Krošlák	1	4
(India) **L Paes**	5	**7^{7}**	**6**
(Canada) D Nestor	**7**	6^{2}	4
3	(Netherlands) **R Krajicek**	3	**6**	**7^{7}**
Q	(Netherlands) H J Davids	**6**	3	6^{2}
(Denmark) K Carlsen	4	6^{3}
6	(Netherlands) **P Haarhuis**	**6**	**7^{7}**
5	(Netherlands) **J Siemerink**	4	**6**	**6**
(New Zealand) B Steven	**6**	3	2
(Sweden) **J Björkman**	**6**	4	**6**
(Netherlands) S Schalken	1	**6**	2
8	(United States) **R Reneberg**	**6**	6^{4}	**7^{8}**
(Switzerland) J Hlasek	1	**7^{7}**	6^{6}
(Denmark) **F Fetterlein**	**6**	5	**7^{7}**
(Morocco) H Arazi	2	**7**	6^{3}

Quarterfinals
(France) **S Simian**	**6**	**7^{7}**
(India) L Paes	3	6^{5}
3	(Netherlands) R Krajicek	4	5
6	(Netherlands) **P Haarhuis**	**6**	**7**
5	(Netherlands) J Siemerink	1	**7^{7}**	6^{4}
(Sweden) **J Björkman**	**6**	6^{3}	**7^{7}**
8	(United States) **R Reneberg**	**6**	4	**6**
(Denmark) F Fetterlein	4	**6**	2

Semifinals
(France) **S Simian**	**6**	**6**
6	(Netherlands) P Haarhuis	3	4
(Sweden) J Björkman	5	2
8	(United States) **R Reneberg**	**7**	**6**

Final
(France) Stéphane Simian	4	0
8	(United States) **Richey Reneberg**	**6**	**6**
