= 1999 Heineken Trophy – Men's singles =

Men's singles
- 1999 Heineken Trophy

Final
- Champion: (Australia) Patrick Rafter
- Runner-up: (Romania) Andrei Pavel
- Score: 3–6, 7–6^{(9–7)}, 6–4

Details
- Draw: 32 (4 Q / 2 WC )
- Seeds: 8

Events
Singles	men	women
Doubles	men	women
← 1998 ·	Heineken Trophy	· 2000 →

Patrick Rafter was the defending champion and defended his title defeating Andrei Pavel 3–6, 7–6^{(9–7)}, 6–4 in the final.

== Seeds ==
1. (Russia) Yevgeny Kafelnikov (withdrew due to a toe injury)
2. (Australia) Patrick Rafter (champion)
3. (Netherlands) Richard Krajicek (quarterfinals)
4. (Slovakia) Karol Kučera (semifinals)
5. (Germany) Tommy Haas (semifinals)
6. (Sweden) Jonas Björkman (quarterfinals)
7. (Netherlands) Jan Siemerink (first round)
8. (Czech Republic) Bohdan Ulihrach (first round)

== Draw ==
=== Key ===
- Q = Qualifier
- WC = Wild card
- LL = Lucky loser
- Alt = Alternate
- SE = Special exempt
- PR = Protected ranking
- ITF = ITF entry
- JE = Junior exempt
- w/o = Walkover
- r = Retired
- d = Defaulted
- SR = Special ranking

=== Finals ===
Semifinals
(Romania) Andrei Pavel	7^{7}	2	6
4	(Slovakia) Karol Kučera	6^{4}	6	3
5	(Germany) Tommy Haas	2	5
2	(Australia) Patrick Rafter	6	7

Final
(Romania) Andrei Pavel	6	6^{7}	4
2	(Australia) Patrick Rafter	3	7^{9}	6

=== Top half ===
First round
LL	(Russia) K Ivanov-Smolensky	2	7^{10}	3
Q	(Germany) K Braasch	6	6^{8}	6
(France) A Di Pasquale	2	2
(Romania) A Pavel	6	6
(Germany) R Schüttler	4	4
(United States) J Tarango	6	6
SE	(Sweden) N Kulti	7^{7}	6
8	(Czech Republic) B Ulihrach	6^{2}	4
4	(Slovakia) K Kučera	6	7
(Netherlands) P Wessels	2	5
(France) A Dupuis	3	6	5
(Netherlands) S Schalken	6	3	7
(Slovakia) J Krošlák	6	6
WC	(Netherlands) R Wassen	4	2
Q	(Germany) M Menzler	0	3
6	(Sweden) J Björkman	6	6

Second round
Q	(Germany) K Braasch	2	1
(Romania) A Pavel	6	6
(United States) J Tarango	6	5	4
SE	(Sweden) N Kulti	3	7	6
4	(Slovakia) K Kučera	7	6
(Netherlands) S Schalken	5	2
(Slovakia) J Krošlák	5	2
6	(Sweden) J Björkman	7	6

Quarterfinals
(Romania) A Pavel	4	6	7^{7}
SE	(Sweden) N Kulti	6	3	6^{3}
4	(Slovakia) K Kučera	6	6
6	(Sweden) J Björkman	2	3

Semifinals
(Romania) A Pavel	7^{7}	2	6
4	(Slovakia) K Kučera	6^{4}	6	3

=== Bottom half ===
First round
5	(Germany) T Haas	6^{1}	6	6
Q	(Netherlands) R Sluiter	7^{7}	3	2
(Czech Republic) D Vacek	6	6
(Germany) H Dreekmann	2	2
WC	(Netherlands) D van Scheppingen	6	3	6^{2}
(Italy) V Santopadre	3	6	7^{7}
(Italy) D Sanguinetti	4	4
3	(Netherlands) R Krajicek	6	6
7	(Netherlands) J Siemerink	4	6	3
(Netherlands) J van Lottum	6	4	6
Q	(Czech Republic) D Rikl	6	3	4
(Denmark) K Carlsen	1	6	6
(Czech Republic) M Damm	6	7^{9}
(Bulgaria) O Stanoytchev	3	6^{7}
(Netherlands) P Haarhuis	6	6^{5}	3
2	(Australia) P Rafter	4	7^{7}	6

Second round
5	(Germany) T Haas	7^{8}	6
(Czech Republic) D Vacek	6^{6}	1
(Italy) V Santopadre	3	6^{1}
3	(Netherlands) R Krajicek	6	7^{7}
(Netherlands) J van Lottum	5	1
(Denmark) K Carlsen	7	6
(Czech Republic) M Damm	3	4
2	(Australia) P Rafter	6	6

Quarterfinals
5	(Germany) T Haas	7^{7}	1	6
3	(Netherlands) R Krajicek	6^{3}	6	4
(Denmark) K Carlsen	3	4
2	(Australia) P Rafter	6	6

Semifinals
5	(Germany) T Haas	2	5
2	(Australia) P Rafter	6	7
