= 1997 Heineken Trophy – Men's doubles =

Men's doubles
- 1997 Heineken Trophy

Final
- Champions: (Netherlands) Jacco Eltingh (Netherlands) Paul Haarhuis
- Runners-up: (United States) Trevor Kronemann (Australia) David Macpherson
- Score: 6–4, 7–5

Events
Singles	men	women
Doubles	men	women
← 1996 ·	Rosmalen Grass Court Championships	· 1998 →

Paul Kilderry and Pavel Vízner were the defending champions, but Kilderry did not compete this year. Vízner teamed up with Martin Damm and lost in semifinals to tournament winners Jacco Eltingh and Paul Haarhuis.

Jacco Eltingh and Paul Haarhuis won the title by defeating Trevor Kronemann and David Macpherson 6–4, 7–5 in the final.

== Seeds ==
1. (Netherlands) Jacco Eltingh / (Netherlands) Paul Haarhuis (champions)
2. (Sweden) Jonas Björkman / (Sweden) Nicklas Kulti (quarterfinals)
3. (Czech Republic) Martin Damm / (Czech Republic) Pavel Vízner (semifinals)
4. (Netherlands) Menno Oosting / (Belgium) Libor Pimek (first round)

== Draw ==
=== Key ===
- Q = Qualifier
- WC = Wild card
- LL = Lucky loser
- Alt = Alternate
- SE = Special exempt
- PR = Protected ranking
- ITF = ITF entry
- JE = Junior exempt
- w/o = Walkover
- r = Retired
- d = Defaulted
- SR = Special ranking

=== Draw ===
First round
1	(Netherlands) J Eltingh (Netherlands) P Haarhuis	6	6
(Italy) F Messori (United States) TJ Middleton	2	4
(United States) M Keil (India) L Paes	4	6	6
(France) G Raoux (Netherlands) S Schalken	6	3	2
3	(Czech Republic) M Damm (Czech Republic) P Vízner	6	6
WC	(United States) M Chang (South Africa) C van Rensburg	4	4
Q	(Spain) E Benfele Álvarez (Czech Republic) S Doseděl	6	6
WC	(Netherlands) T Nijssen (Netherlands) D van Scheppingen	3	0
(United States) T Kronemann (Australia) D Macpherson	4	6	2
(United States) S Melville (United States) C Woodruff	6	4	0^{r}
(Australia) J Eagle (Australia) A Florent	7	3	6
4	(Netherlands) M Oosting (Belgium) L Pimek	6	6	3
WC	(Netherlands) S Noteboom (Netherlands) F Wibier	4	7	6
(Italy) C Brandi (France) F Santoro	6	5	4
(Sweden) P Nyborg (United States) R Reneberg	4	6
2	(Sweden) J Björkman (Sweden) N Kulti	6	7

Quarterfinals
1	(Netherlands) J Eltingh (Netherlands) P Haarhuis	w	/	o
(United States) M Keil (India) L Paes
3	(Czech Republic) M Damm (Czech Republic) P Vízner	6	7
Q	(Spain) E Benfele Álvarez (Czech Republic) S Doseděl	4	6
(United States) T Kronemann (Australia) D Macpherson	7	6	6
(Australia) J Eagle (Australia) A Florent	6	7	4
WC	(Netherlands) S Noteboom (Netherlands) F Wibier	6	6
2	(Sweden) J Björkman (Sweden) N Kulti	3	4

Semifinals
1	(Netherlands) J Eltingh (Netherlands) P Haarhuis	6	6
3	(Czech Republic) M Damm (Czech Republic) P Vízner	4	2
(United States) T Kronemann (Australia) D Macpherson	6	6
WC	(Netherlands) S Noteboom (Netherlands) F Wibier	3	4

Final
1	(Netherlands) J Eltingh (Netherlands) P Haarhuis	6	7
(United States) T Kronemann (Australia) D Macpherson	4	5
