= 2001 Canada Masters and the Rogers AT&T Cup =

2001 Canada Masters
- Date: July 30 – August 5 (men); August 13–19 (women)
- Edition: 112th
- Surface: Hard / outdoor

Champions

Men's singles
- (Romania) Andrei Pavel

Women's singles
- (United States) Serena Williams

Men's doubles
- (Czech Republic) Jiří Novák / (Czech Republic) David Rikl

Women's doubles
- (United States) Kimberly Po-Messerli / (Australia) Nicole Pratt
- Canadian Open

The 2001 Canada Masters and the Rogers AT&T Cup were tennis tournaments played on outdoor hard courts. It was the 112th edition of the Canada Masters and was part of the Tennis Masters Series of the 2001 ATP Tour and of Tier I of the 2001 WTA Tour. The men's event took place at the du Maurier Stadium in Montreal in Canada from July 30 through August 5, 2001 and the women's event at the National Tennis Centre in Toronto in Canada from August 13 through August 19, 2001.

The men's draw was headlined by World No. 1, Monte Carlo, Rome and French Open champion Gustavo Kuerten, ATP No. 3 and reigning US Open champion Marat Safin and Indian Wells, Miami and Australian Open champion Andre Agassi. Other top seeds were Rome finalist Juan Carlos Ferrero, Queen's Club and 's-Hertogenbosch champion Lleyton Hewitt, Yevgeny Kafelnikov, Tim Henman and Àlex Corretja.

The women's draw featured WTA No. 2, Australian Open and French Open champion Jennifer Capriati, 's-Hertogenbosch winner and Wimbledon runner-up Justine Henin and Berlin champion Amélie Mauresmo. Also competing were Indian Wells champion Serena Williams, former World No. 1 Monica Seles, Elena Dementieva, Amanda Coetzer and Magdalena Maleeva.

== Finals ==
=== Men's singles ===
(Romania) Andrei Pavel defeated (Australia) Patrick Rafter 7–6^{(7–3)}, 2–6, 6–3

- It was Pavel's only title of the year and the 4th of his career. It was his 1st career Masters title.

=== Women's singles ===
(United States) Serena Williams defeated (United States) Jennifer Capriati 6–4, 6–7^{(7–9)}, 6–3

- It was Williams' 3rd title of the year and the 20th of her career. It was her 2nd Tier I title of the year and her 3rd overall.

=== Men's doubles ===
(Czech Republic) Jiří Novák / (Czech Republic) David Rikl defeated (United States) Donald Johnson / (United States) Jared Palmer 6–4, 3–6, 6–3

- It was Novák's 4th title of the year and the 19th of his career. It was Rikl's 3rd title of the year and the 22nd of his career.

=== Women's doubles ===
(United States) Kimberly Po-Messerli / (Australia) Nicole Pratt defeated (Slovenia) Tina Križan / (Slovenia) Katarina Srebotnik 6–3, 6–1

- It was Po-Messerli's 2nd title of the year and the 5th of her career. It was Pratt's only title of the year and the 3rd of her career.
