= 1998 Heineken Trophy – Men's doubles =

Men's doubles
- 1998 Heineken Trophy

Final
- Champions: (France) Guillaume Raoux (Netherlands) Jan Siemerink
- Runners-up: (Australia) Joshua Eagle (Australia) Andrew Florent
- Score: 7–6^{(7–5)}, 6–2

Events
Singles	men	women
Doubles	men	women
← 1997 ·	Heineken Trophy	· 1999 →

The 1998 Heineken Trophy was a tennis tournament played on grass courts in Rosmalen in the Netherlands that was part of the International Series of the 1998 ATP Tour and of Tier III of the 1998 WTA Tour. The tournament was held from June 15 through June 21, 1998.

== Seeds ==
Champion seeds are indicated in bold text while text in italics indicates the round in which those seeds were eliminated.

1. (Netherlands) Jacco Eltingh / (Netherlands) Paul Haarhuis (first round)
2. (United States) Donald Johnson / (United States) Francisco Montana (quarterfinals)
3. Unknown (withdrew)
4. (Czech Republic) Cyril Suk / (Czech Republic) Daniel Vacek (semifinals)

== Draw ==
=== Key ===
- Q = Qualifier
- WC = Wild card
- LL = Lucky loser
- Alt = Alternate
- SE = Special exempt
- PR = Protected ranking
- ITF = ITF entry
- JE = Junior exempt
- w/o = Walkover
- r = Retired
- d = Defaulted
- SR = Special ranking

=== Finals ===
First round
(France) **G Raoux** **(Netherlands) J Siemerink**	w/o
1	(Netherlands) J Eltingh (Netherlands) P Haarhuis
(North Macedonia) **A Kitinov** **(Czech Republic) P Vízner**	**6**	**7**
(United States) J Tarango (Netherlands) F Wibier	4	6
(Czechoslovakia) **M Damm** **(United States) J Grabb**	6	**7**	**6**
(Netherlands) T Kempers (Netherlands) M Oosting	**7**	6	4
(Netherlands) **S Noteboom** **(Netherlands) P Wessels**	4	**6**	**6**
(Australia) P Kilderry (Sweden) P Nyborg	**6**	3	2
(Netherlands) **S Schalken** **(Netherlands) J van Lottum**	**6**	**6**
(United States) B Coupe (Mexico) D Roditi	3	2
4	(Czech Republic) **C Suk** **(Czech Republic) D Vacek**	**7**	**6**
(Argentina) D Orsanic (Venezuela) M Ruah	5	4
(Australia) **J Eagle** **(Australia) A Florent**	**6**	**6**
(South Africa) P Rosner (United States) J Waite	2	4
2	(United States) **D Johnson** **(United States) F Montana**	**6**	**6**
(Germany) K Braasch (Germany) J Knippschild	3	4

Quarterfinals
(France) **G Raoux** **(Netherlands) J Siemerink**	6	**6**	**7**
(North Macedonia) A Kitinov (Czech Republic) P Vízner	**7**	4	6
(Czechoslovakia) **M Damm** **(United States) J Grabb**	5	**6**	**6**
(Netherlands) S Noteboom (Netherlands) P Wessels	**7**	4	4
(Netherlands) S Schalken (Netherlands) J van Lottum	6	3
4	(Czech Republic) **C Suk** **(Czech Republic) D Vacek**	**7**	**6**
(Australia) **J Eagle** **(Australia) A Florent**	**7**	**6**
2	(United States) D Johnson (United States) F Montana	6	4

Semifinals
(France) **G Raoux** **(Netherlands) J Siemerink**	w/o
(Czechoslovakia) M Damm (United States) J Grabb
4	(Czech Republic) C Suk (Czech Republic) D Vacek	3	**6**	1
(Australia) **J Eagle** **(Australia) A Florent**	**6**	3	**6**

Final
(France) **G Raoux** **(Netherlands) J Siemerink**	**7**	**6**
(Australia) J Eagle (Australia) A Florent	6	2
