= 2000 Heineken Trophy – Women's singles =

Women's singles
- 2000 Heineken Trophy

Final
- Champion: (Switzerland) Martina Hingis
- Runner-up: (Romania) Ruxandra Dragomir
- Score: 6–2, 3–0, retired

Details
- Draw: 30 (2 WC / 2 Alt )
- Seeds: 9

Events
Singles	men	women
Doubles	men	women
← 1999 ·	Heineken Trophy	· 2001 →

Kristina Brandi was the defending champion, but lost in semifinals to Ruxandra Dragomir

Martina Hingis won the title, after Ruxandra Dragomir was forced to retire during the final. The score was 6–2, 3–0.

== Seeds ==
The first two seeds received a bye into the second round.

1. (Switzerland) Martina Hingis (champion)
2. (France) Sandrine Testud (quarterfinals)
3. (Austria) Barbara Schett (first round)
4. (United States) Jennifer Capriati (semifinals)
5. (Belgium) Sabine Appelmans (first round)
6. (Australia) Jelena Dokic (second round)
7. (Belgium) Kim Clijsters (second round)
8. (Romania) Ruxandra Dragomir (final, retired)
9. (United States) Kristina Brandi (semifinals)

== Draw ==
Key

- Q = Qualifier
- WC = Wild card
- LL = Lucky loser
- Alt = Alternate
- ITF = ITF entry
- PR = Protected ranking
- SR = Special ranking
- SE = Special exempt
- JE = Junior exempt
- JR = Junior Accelerator Programme entrant
- CO = College Accelerator Programme entrant
- NG = Next Gen Accelerator Program entrant
- w/o = Walkover
- r = Retired
- d = Defaulted

=== Finals ===
Semifinals
1	(Switzerland) Martina Hingis	7	6
4	(United States) Jennifer Capriati	5	2
9	(United States) Kristina Brandi	2	3
8	(Romania) Ruxandra Dragomir	6	6

Final
1	(Switzerland) Martina Hingis	6	3
8	(Romania) Ruxandra Dragomir	2	0^{r}

=== Top half ===
First round
(Czech Republic) A Gerši	3	0
(Canada) J Nejedly	6	6
Alt	(Bulgaria) L Bacheva	3	2
(Thailand) T Tanasugarn	6	6
(Zimbabwe) C Black	6	6
5	(Belgium) S Appelmans	3	4
4	(United States) J Capriati	6	6
(Bulgaria) M Maleeva	3	1
(United States) E deLone	7	6
(United States) M Shaughnessy	5	2
(Slovakia) K Habšudová	0	4
(Switzerland) P Schnyder	6	6
(Netherlands) K Boogert	3	6	3
7	(Belgium) K Clijsters	6	4	6

Second round
1	(Switzerland) M Hingis	6	6
(Canada) J Nejedly	0	2
(Thailand) T Tanasugarn	6^{3}	2
(Zimbabwe) C Black	7^{7}	6
4	(United States) J Capriati	6	5	6
(United States) E deLone	1	7	1
(Switzerland) P Schnyder	6	4	7
7	(Belgium) K Clijsters	4	6	5

Quarterfinals
1	(Switzerland) M Hingis	w/o
(Zimbabwe) C Black
4	(United States) J Capriati	7	7
(Switzerland) P Schnyder	5	5

Semifinals
1	(Switzerland) M Hingis	7	6
4	(United States) J Capriati	5	2

=== Bottom half ===
First round
6	(Australia) J Dokic	6	6
WC	(Netherlands) M Oremans	4	3
9	(United States) K Brandi	6	6
(Austria) B Schwartz	3	1
(Italy) R Grande	4	2
Alt	(Netherlands) A Hopmans	6	6
(Australia) N Pratt	6	6
3	(Austria) B Schett	4	2
8	(Romania) R Dragomir	4	6	6
(Russia) N Petrova	6	4	4
(Slovakia) H Nagyová	6	6
WC	(Czech Republic) S Kleinová	4	3
(Austria) P Wartusch	7	3	1
(Belgium) J Henin	5	6	6

Second round
6	(Australia) J Dokic	0	1
9	(United States) K Brandi	6	6
Alt	(Netherlands) A Hopmans	2	0^{r}
(Australia) N Pratt	6	0
8	(Romania) R Dragomir	6	6
(Slovakia) H Nagyová	4	0
(Belgium) J Henin	1	7	6^{1}
2	(France) S Testud	6	5	7^{7}

Quarterfinals
9	(United States) K Brandi	6	7
(Australia) N Pratt	3	5
8	(Romania) R Dragomir	2	6	6
2	(France) S Testud	6	4	4

Semifinals
9	(United States) K Brandi	2	3
8	(Romania) R Dragomir	6	6
