= 1998 Heineken Trophy – Men's singles =

Men's singles
- 1998 Heineken Trophy

Final
- Champion: (Australia) Patrick Rafter
- Runner-up: (Czech Republic) Martin Damm
- Score: 7–6^{(7–2)}, 6–2

Events
Singles	men	women
Doubles	men	women
← 1997 ·	Heineken Trophy	· 1999 →

Richard Krajicek was the defending champion, but he withdrew prior to his quarterfinal match this year.

Patrick Rafter won the tournament, beating Martin Damm in the final, 7–6^{(7–2)}, 6–2.

== Seeds ==
1. (Australia) Patrick Rafter (champion)
2. (Russia) Yevgeny Kafelnikov (first round)
3. (Slovakia) Karol Kučera (quarterfinals)
4. (Netherlands) Richard Krajicek (quarterfinals, withdrew)
5. (Germany) Nicolas Kiefer (first round)
6. (Brazil) Gustavo Kuerten (first round)
7. (Netherlands) Jan Siemerink (semifinals)
8. (France) Guillaume Raoux (second round)

== Draw ==
=== Key ===
- Q = Qualifier
- WC = Wild card
- LL = Lucky loser
- Alt = Alternate
- ITF = ITF entry
- PR = Protected ranking
- SR = Special ranking
- SE = Special exempt
- JE = Junior exempt
- JR = Junior Accelerator Programme entrant
- CO = College Accelerator Programme entrant
- NG = Next Gen Accelerator Program entrant
- w/o = Walkover
- r = Retired
- d = Defaulted

=== Finals ===
Semifinals
1	(Australia) Patrick Rafter	6	6
Q	(Netherlands) Dennis van Scheppingen	3	4
(Czech Republic) Martin Damm	7^{7}	6
7	(Netherlands) Jan Siemerink	6^{5}	3

Final
1	(Australia) Patrick Rafter	7^{7}	6
(Czech Republic) Martin Damm	6^{2}	2

=== Top half ===
First round
1	(Australia) P Rafter	6	4	6
(Czech Republic) D Vacek	3	6	4
Q	(Ukraine) A Medvedev	6	6
(Spain) Á Calatrava	2	3
(Netherlands) S Schalken	6	6
(Morocco) K Alami	0	1
(Sweden) T Johansson	3	4
8	(France) G Raoux	6	6
4	(Netherlands) R Krajicek	7^{7}	4	7^{7}
(Australia) R Fromberg	6^{0}	6	6^{5}
(Romania) A Pavel	2	4
(Czech Republic) S Doseděl	6	6
(United States) J-M Gambill	4	4
WC	(Netherlands) P Wessels	6	6
Q	(Netherlands) D van Scheppingen	3	6	7^{7}
6	(Brazil) G Kuerten	6	4	6^{2}

Second round
1	(Australia) P Rafter	7^{7}	4	7^{9}
Q	(Ukraine) A Medvedev	6^{2}	6	6^{7}
(Netherlands) S Schalken	6	7
8	(France) G Raoux	2	5
4	(Netherlands) R Krajicek	7^{7}	6^{4}	6
(Czech Republic) S Doseděl	6^{3}	7^{7}	3
WC	(Netherlands) P Wessels	6^{5}	6^{3}
Q	(Netherlands) D van Scheppingen	7^{7}	7^{7}

Quarterfinals
1	(Australia) P Rafter	6	6
(Netherlands) S Schalken	1	4
4	(Netherlands) R Krajicek
Q	(Netherlands) D van Scheppingen	w/o

Semifinals
1	(Australia) P Rafter	6	6
Q	(Netherlands) D van Scheppingen	3	4

=== Bottom half ===
First round
5	(Germany) N Kiefer	5	4
(Netherlands) J van Lottum	7	6
(United States) V Spadea	4	5
(Czech Republic) M Damm	6	7
(Denmark) K Carlsen	5	6	6
Q	(Netherlands) R Sluiter	7	3	3
(Germany) H Dreekmann	3	2
3	(Slovakia) K Kučera	6	6
7	(Netherlands) J Siemerink	6	7
(Switzerland) M Rosset	3	5
(Belgium) J van Herck	6^{2}	3
(Belgium) F Dewulf	7^{7}	6
(Netherlands) P Haarhuis	6	3	6
Q	(Germany) J Knippschild	3	6	3
(United States) S Campbell	7	6
2	(Russia) Y Kafelnikov	5	2

Second round
(Netherlands) J van Lottum	4	4
(Czech Republic) M Damm	6	6
(Denmark) K Carlsen	2	2
3	(Slovakia) K Kučera	6	6
7	(Netherlands) J Siemerink	6	6
(Belgium) F Dewulf	2	1
(Netherlands) P Haarhuis	6	3	6^{1}
(United States) S Campbell	2	6	7^{7}

Quarterfinals
(Czech Republic) M Damm	6^{1}	6	6
3	(Slovakia) K Kučera	7^{7}	1	4
7	(Netherlands) J Siemerink	2	6	6
(United States) S Campbell	6	1	3

Semifinals
(Czech Republic) M Damm	7^{7}	6
7	(Netherlands) J Siemerink	6^{5}	3
