= 2001 Rogers AT&T Cup – Singles =

Singles
- 2001 Canada Masters and the Rogers AT&T Cup

Final
- Champion: (United States) Serena Williams
- Runner-up: (United States) Jennifer Capriati
- Score: 6–1, 6–7^{(7–9)}, 6–3

Details
- Draw: 56 (4WC/8Q/2LL)
- Seeds: 16

Events
Singles	men	women
Doubles	men	women
← 2000 ·	Canada Masters	· 2002 →
← 2000 ·	Rogers AT&T Cup	· 2002 →

Serena Williams defeated Jennifer Capriati in the final, 6–1, 6–7^{(7–9)}, 6–3 to win the women's singles tennis title at the 2001 Canadian Open.

Martina Hingis was the two-time reigning champion, but chose not to participate that year.

== Seeds ==
The top eight seeds received a bye into the second round.

1. (United States) Jennifer Capriati (final)
2. (Belgium) Justine Henin (quarterfinals)
3. (France) Amélie Mauresmo (third round)
4. (United States) Serena Williams (champion)
5. (United States) Monica Seles (semifinals)
6. (Russia) Elena Dementieva (third round)
7. (South Africa) Amanda Coetzer (third round)
8. (Bulgaria) Magdalena Maleeva (second round)
9. (United States) Meghann Shaughnessy (quarterfinals)
10. (Socialist Federal Republic of Yugoslavia) Jelena Dokić (third round)
11. (France) Sandrine Testud (quarterfinals)
12. (Spain) Arantxa Sánchez Vicario (first round)
13. (Spain) ~~Conchita Martínez~~ (withdrew due to an achilles injury)
14. (Germany) Anke Huber (semifinals)
15. (Austria) Barbara Schett (third round)
16. (United States) Chanda Rubin (second round, retired due to a sprained ankle)
17. (Uzbekistan) Iroda Tulyaganova (first round)

== Draw ==
=== Key ===
- Q = Qualifier
- WC = Wild card
- LL = Lucky loser
- Alt = Alternate
- SE = Special exempt
- PR = Protected ranking
- ITF = ITF entry
- JE = Junior exempt
- w/o = Walkover
- r = Retired
- d = Defaulted
- SR = Special ranking

=== Finals ===
Quarterfinals
1	(United States) Jennifer Capriati	7	6
9	(United States) Meghann Shaughnessy	5	4
14	(Germany) Anke Huber	7	6
Q	(United States) Jennifer Hopkins	6^{4}	3
11	(France) Sandrine Testud	0	2
4	(United States) Serena Williams	6	6
5	(United States) Monica Seles	1	6	6
2	(Belgium) Justine Henin	6	2	2

Semifinals
1	(United States) Jennifer Capriati	6	3	6
14	(Germany) Anke Huber	3	6	3
4	(United States) Serena Williams	7	7
5	(United States) Monica Seles	5	6^{5}

Final
1	(United States) Jennifer Capriati	1	7	3
4	(United States) Serena Williams	6	6^{7}	6

=== Top half ===
==== Section 1 ====
First round
Q	(Italy) A Serra Zanetti	4	4
(Slovakia) D Hantuchová	6	6
Q	(Kazakhstan) I Selyutina	2	4
Q	(Indonesia) W Prakusya	6	6
(United States) M Tu	3	6	6
17	(Uzbekistan) I Tulyaganova	6	3	4
9	(United States) M Shaughnessy	6	6
(Russia) L Krasnoroutskaya	1	4
LL	(Japan) S Asagoe	6^{2}	6	6
(Russia) E Bovina	7	3	4
(Czech Republic) D Bedáňová	7	6^{5}	6
(Zimbabwe) C Black	5	7	0

Second round
1	(United States) J Capriati	5	7	6
(Slovakia) D Hantuchová	7	5	2
Q	(Indonesia) W Prakusya	7	4	6
(United States) M Tu	6^{2}	6	3
9	(United States) M Shaughnessy	6	6
LL	(Japan) S Asagoe	0	4
(Czech Republic) D Bedáňová	6	7
8	(Bulgaria) M Maleeva	4	6^{4}

Third round
1	(United States) J Capriati	7	6
Q	(Indonesia) W Prakusya	6^{2}	2
9	(United States) M Shaughnessy	6	6
(Czech Republic) D Bedáňová	4	4

Quarterfinals
1	(United States) J Capriati	7	6
9	(United States) M Shaughnessy	5	4

==== Section 2 ====
First round
(Russia) E Likhovtseva	6	6
(Germany) J Kandarr	4	4
WC	(Canada) M Drake	1	6^{3}
LL	(Australia) E Dominikovic	6	7
(Germany) B Rittner	6	3	3
14	(Germany) A Huber	2	6	6
12	(Spain) A Sánchez Vicario	6	1	4
(Germany) M Weingärtner	3	6	6
Q	(United States) J Hopkins	7	7
(France) N Dechy	5	5
WC	(United States) L Raymond	6	4	2
(Italy) R Grande	1	6	6

Second round
3	(France) A Mauresmo	6	6
(Russia) E Likhovtseva	0	3
LL	(Australia) E Dominikovic	6^{3}	1
14	(Germany) A Huber	7	6
(Germany) M Weingärtner	6	3	5
Q	(United States) J Hopkins	4	6	7
(Italy) R Grande	2	3
7	(South Africa) A Coetzer	6	6

Third round
3	(France) A Mauresmo	3	3
14	(Germany) A Huber	6	6
Q	(United States) J Hopkins	6	6
7	(South Africa) A Coetzer	4	3

Quarterfinals
14	(Germany) A Huber	7	6
Q	(United States) J Hopkins	6^{4}	3

=== Bottom half ===
==== Section 3 ====
First round
Q	(United States) S Reeves	3	2
(Czech Republic) K Hrdličková	6	6
(Argentina) M Díaz Oliva	3	7	6
WC	(Canada) V Webb	6	5	1
(Spain) V Ruano Pascual	6	3	4
11	(France) S Testud	3	6	6
15	(Austria) B Schett	6	6
(France) A-G Sidot	3	4
(Russia) T Panova	0	3
(Thailand) T Tanasugarn	6	6
(Croatia) I Majoli	6	4	7
Q	(United States) M Washington	1	6	5

Second round
6	(Russia) E Dementieva	4	6	6
(Czech Republic) K Hrdličková	6	4	3
(Argentina) M Díaz Oliva	4	1
11	(France) S Testud	6	6
15	(Austria) B Schett	6	6
(Thailand) T Tanasugarn	3	2
(Croatia) I Majoli	6^{2}	1
4	(United States) S Williams	7	6

Third round
6	(Russia) E Dementieva	7	5	6^{4}
11	(France) S Testud	6^{2}	7	7
15	(Austria) B Schett	6	3	2
4	(United States) S Williams	3	6	6

Quarterfinals
11	(France) S Testud	0	2
4	(United States) S Williams	6	6

==== Section 4 ====
First round
Q	(United States) M Irvin	6	6
(Slovakia) H Nagyová	4	4
(Spain) G León García	5	6	3
(Spain) M Serna	7	1	6
(Russia) N Petrova	7	5	1
10	(Socialist Federal Republic of Yugoslavia) J Dokić	6^{5}	7	6
16	(United States) C Rubin	6	6
WC	(Canada) J Nejedly	3	2
(United States) A Frazier	6	6
(Luxembourg) A Kremer	2	3
Q	(Tunisia) S Sfar	1	3
(Japan) A Sugiyama	6	6

Second round
5	(United States) M Seles	6	6
Q	(United States) M Irvin	3	2
(Spain) M Serna	1	4
10	(Socialist Federal Republic of Yugoslavia) J Dokić	6	6
16	(United States) C Rubin	4	6	0^{r}
(United States) A Frazier	6	3	1
(Japan) A Sugiyama	4	6^{5}
2	(Belgium) J Henin	6	7

Third round
5	(United States) M Seles	6	7
10	(Socialist Federal Republic of Yugoslavia) J Dokić	3	6^{3}
(United States) A Frazier	3	2
2	(Belgium) J Henin	6	6

Quarterfinals
5	(United States) M Seles	1	6	6
2	(Belgium) J Henin	6	2	2

== Qualifying ==
=== Qualifying seeds ===
1. (United States) Jennifer Hopkins (qualified)
2. (Japan) Shinobu Asagoe (qualifying competition, lucky loser)
3. (Australia) Evie Dominikovic (qualifying competition, lucky loser)
4. (Australia) Alicia Molik (first round)
5. (Tunisia) Selima Sfar (qualified)
6. (France) Émilie Loit (first round)
7. (United States) Sandra Cacic (qualifying competition, retired)
8. (United States) Jill Craybas (first round)
9. (Germany) Anca Barna (first round)
10. (Spain) Nuria Llagostera Vives (qualifying competition)
11. (United States) Marissa Irvin (qualified)
12. (Argentina) María Emilia Salerni (first round)
13. (Croatia) Silvija Talaja (qualifying competition)
14. (Italy) Adriana Serra Zanetti (qualified)
15. (Slovenia) Katarina Srebotnik (first round)
16. (Russia) Anastasia Myskina (qualifying competition)

=== Qualifiers ===
1. (United States) Jennifer Hopkins
2. (Kazakhstan) Irina Selyutina
3. (United States) Marissa Irvin
4. (United States) Samantha Reeves
5. (Tunisia) Selima Sfar
6. (United States) Mashona Washington
7. (Indonesia) Wynne Prakusya
8. (Italy) Adriana Serra Zanetti

=== Lucky losers ===
1. (Japan) Shinobu Asagoe
2. (Australia) Evie Dominikovic

=== Qualifying draw ===
==== First qualifier ====
First round
1	(United States) Jennifer Hopkins	6	6
(Canada) Sonya Jeyaseelan	3	1
(Italy) Roberta Vinci	6	2	0
16	(Russia) Anastasia Myskina	3	6	6

Qualifying competition
1	(United States) Jennifer Hopkins	6	4	6
16	(Russia) Anastasia Myskina	4	6	4

==== Second qualifier ====
First round
2	(Japan) Shinobu Asagoe	7^{7}	7^{7}
(France) Alexandra Fusai	6^{2}	6^{1}
(Kazakhstan) Irina Selyutina	6	6
15	(Slovenia) Katarina Srebotnik	4	1

Qualifying competition
2	(Japan) Shinobu Asagoe	1	2
(Kazakhstan) Irina Selyutina	6	6

==== Third qualifier ====
First round
3	(Australia) Evie Dominikovic	6	6
WC	(Canada) Beier Ko	2	0
WC	(Canada) Alison Nash	0	1
11	(United States) Marissa Irvin	6	6

Qualifying competition
3	(Australia) Evie Dominikovic	7^{8}	0	3
11	(United States) Marissa Irvin	6^{6}	6	6

==== Fourth qualifier ====
First round
4	(Australia) Alicia Molik	6^{1}	4
(United States) Samantha Reeves	7^{7}	6
WC	(Canada) Mélanie Marois	4	6	1
10	(Spain) Nuria Llagostera Vives	6	3	6

Qualifying competition
(United States) Samantha Reeves	6	6
10	(Spain) Nuria Llagostera Vives	3	1

==== Fifth qualifier ====
First round
5	(Tunisia) Selima Sfar	6	7^{7}
(Canada) Renata Kolbovic	1	6^{4}
(United States) Erika deLone	6^{2}	6^{3}
13	(Croatia) Silvija Talaja	7^{7}	7^{7}

Qualifying competition
5	(Tunisia) Selima Sfar	4	7^{7}	6
13	(Croatia) Silvija Talaja	6	6^{3}	4

==== Sixth qualifier ====
First round
6	(France) Émilie Loit	3	6	4
(United Kingdom) Lucie Ahl	6	4	6
(United States) Mashona Washington	6	6
12	(Argentina) María Emilia Salerni	4	3

Qualifying competition
(United Kingdom) Lucie Ahl	6^{6}	1
(United States) Mashona Washington	7^{8}	6

==== Seventh qualifier ====
First round
7	(United States) Sandra Cacic	6	6^{10}	6
(Australia) Lisa McShea	4	7^{12}	4
(Indonesia) Wynne Prakusya	6	2	6
9	(Germany) Anca Barna	2	6	3

Qualifying competition
7	(United States) Sandra Cacic	2^{r}
(Indonesia) Wynne Prakusya	5

==== Eighth qualifier ====
First round
8	(United States) Jill Craybas	2	3
(Canada) Marie-Ève Pelletier	6	6
WC	(Canada) Diana Srebrovic	1	4
14	(Italy) Adriana Serra Zanetti	6	6

Qualifying competition
(Canada) Marie-Ève Pelletier	3	6	4
14	(Italy) Adriana Serra Zanetti	6	2	6
