= 2001 Canada Masters – Doubles =

Doubles
- 2001 Canada Masters and the Rogers AT&T Cup

Final
- Champions: (Czech Republic) Jiří Novák (Czech Republic) David Rikl
- Runners-up: (United States) Donald Johnson (United States) Jared Palmer
- Score: 6–4, 3–6, 6–3

Details
- Draw: 32
- Seeds: 8

Events
Singles	men	women
Doubles	men	women
- Canada Masters Rogers AT&T Cup

The 2001 Canada Masters doubles was the men's doubles event of the one hundred and twelfth edition of the Canada Masters; a WTA Tier I tournament and the most prestigious men's tennis tournament held in Canada. Sébastien Lareau and Daniel Nestor were the defending champions but they competed with different partners that year, Lareau with Justin Gimelstob and Nestor with Sandon Stolle. Gimelstob and Lareau lost in the first round to Mark Knowles and Brian MacPhie, as did Nestor and Stolle to Jan-Michael Gambill and Simon Larose. Jiří Novák and David Rikl won in the final 6–4, 3–6, 6–3 against Donald Johnson and Jared Palmer.

== Seeds ==
Champion seeds are indicated in bold text while text in italics indicates the round in which those seeds were eliminated.

1. (Sweden) Jonas Björkman / (Australia) Todd Woodbridge (second round)
2. (United States) Donald Johnson / (United States) Jared Palmer (final)
3. (Canada) Daniel Nestor / (Australia) Sandon Stolle (first round)
4. (Czech Republic) **Jiří Novák** / (Czech Republic) **David Rikl (champions)**
5. (Czech Republic) Petr Pála / (Czech Republic) Pavel Vízner (first round)
6. (South Africa) Wayne Ferreira / (Russia) Yevgeny Kafelnikov (first round)
7. (India) Mahesh Bhupathi / (India) Leander Paes (first round)
8. (South Africa) Ellis Ferreira / (United States) Rick Leach (quarterfinals)

== Draw ==
Key

- Q = Qualifier
- WC = Wild card
- LL = Lucky loser
- Alt = Alternate
- ITF = ITF entry
- PR = Protected ranking
- SR = Special ranking
- SE = Special exempt
- JE = Junior exempt
- JR = Junior Accelerator Programme entrant
- CO = College Accelerator Programme entrant
- NG = Next Gen Accelerator Program entrant
- w/o = Walkover
- r = Retired
- d = Defaulted

=== Final ===
Final
4	(Czech Republic) **Jiří Novák** (Czech Republic) **David Rikl**	**6**	3	**6**
2	(United States) Donald Johnson (United States) Jared Palmer	4	**6**	3

=== Top half ===
First round
1	(Sweden) **J Björkman** (Australia) **T Woodbridge**	6^{4}	**6**	**6**
(Australia) D Macpherson (South Africa) G Stafford	**7^{7}**	1	4
(South Africa) **D Adams** (Netherlands) **S Schalken**	**6**	**6**
WC	(Canada) J Robichaud (Canada) J Turek	1	4
WC	(United States) J Gimelstob (Canada) S Lareau	6^{5}	6^{5}
(The Bahamas) **M Knowles** (United States) **B MacPhie**	**7^{7}**	**7^{7}**
ALT	(Japan) **T Shimada** (South Africa) **M Wakefield**	**6**	6^{7}	**6**
5	(Czech Republic) P Pála (Czech Republic) P Vízner	1	**7^{9}**	3
4	(Czech Republic) **J Novák** (Czech Republic) **D Rikl**	**6**	**6**
(Brazil) J Oncins (Argentina) D Orsanic	4	2
(Australia) **A Florent** (Australia) **M Hill**	**6**	**6**
(Argentina) M García (Czech Republic) C Suk	3	4
WC	(Sweden) T Enqvist (Sweden) T Johansson	**6**	6^{1}	6^{4}
(Belarus) **M Mirnyi** (France) **F Santoro**	4	**7^{7}**	**7^{7}**
(Australia) **W Arthurs** (Australia) **A Kratzmann**	**6**	**6**
6	(South Africa) W Ferreira (Russia) Y Kafelnikov	4	3

Second round
1	(Sweden) J Björkman (Australia) T Woodbridge	6^{5}	**6**	4
(South Africa) **D Adams** (Netherlands) **S Schalken**	**7^{7}**	1	**6**
(The Bahamas) M Knowles (United States) B MacPhie	5	**6**	4
ALT	(Japan) **T Shimada** (South Africa) **M Wakefield**	**7**	4	**6**
4	(Czech Republic) **J Novák** (Czech Republic) **D Rikl**	**6**	**6**
(Australia) A Florent (Australia) M Hill	4	4
(Belarus) M Mirnyi (France) F Santoro
(Australia) **W Arthurs** (Australia) **A Kratzmann**	w/o

Quarterfinals
(South Africa) **D Adams** (Netherlands) **S Schalken**	6^{4}	**6**	**7^{11}**
ALT	(Japan) T Shimada (South Africa) M Wakefield	**7^{7}**	4	6^{9}
4	(Czech Republic) **J Novák** (Czech Republic) **D Rikl**	**6**	**6**
(Australia) W Arthurs (Australia) A Kratzmann	4	4

Semifinals
(South Africa) D Adams (Netherlands) S Schalken	3	**6**	0
4	(Czech Republic) **J Novák** (Czech Republic) **D Rikl**	**6**	4	**6**

=== Bottom half ===
First round
7	(India) M Bhupathi (India) L Paes	3	**6**	3
(United States) **S Humphries** (United States) **A O'Brien**	**6**	3	**6**
(Czech Republic) M Damm (Germany) D Prinosil	**6**	6^{6}	6^{3}
(United States) **J Tarango** (Czech Republic) **D Vacek**	3	**7^{8}**	**7^{7}**
WC	(Australia) L Hewitt (Australia) P Rafter	6^{4}	1
(United States) **B Bryan** (United States) **M Bryan**	**7^{7}**	**6**
WC	(United States) **J-M Gambill** (Canada) **S Larose**	**7^{7}**	**6**
3	(Canada) D Nestor (Australia) S Stolle	6^{5}	4
8	(South Africa) **E Ferreira** (United States) **R Leach**	**7^{9}**	**7^{7}**
(South Africa) C Haggard (Belgium) T Vanhoudt	6^{7}	6^{5}
(Zimbabwe) **W Black** (Zimbabwe) **K Ullyett**	**6**	**6**
WC	(Canada) F Dancevic (Canada) P Gubenco	0	4
(Zimbabwe) B Black (Slovakia) D Hrbatý	3	2
(Czech Republic) **T Cibulec** (Czech Republic) **L Friedl**	**6**	**6**
WC	(Canada) B Kokavec (Canada) F Niemeyer	**6**	5	1
2	(United States) **D Johnson** (United States) **J Palmer**	3	**7**	**6**

Second round
(United States) S Humphries (United States) A O'Brien	6^{7}	6^{0}
(United States) **J Tarango** (Czech Republic) **D Vacek**	**7^{9}**	**7^{7}**
(United States) B Bryan (United States) M Bryan	4	**6**	6^{6}
WC	(United States) **J-M Gambill** (Canada) **S Larose**	**6**	4	**7^{8}**
8	(South Africa) **E Ferreira** (United States) **R Leach**	5	**7^{7}**	**6**
(Zimbabwe) W Black (Zimbabwe) K Ullyett	**7**	6^{4}	4
(Czech Republic) T Cibulec (Czech Republic) L Friedl	3	6^{3}
2	(United States) **D Johnson** (United States) **J Palmer**	**6**	**7^{7}**

Quarterfinals
(United States) J Tarango (Czech Republic) D Vacek	3	5
WC	(United States) **J-M Gambill** (Canada) **S Larose**	**6**	**7**
8	(South Africa) E Ferreira (United States) R Leach	6^{4}	5
2	(United States) **D Johnson** (United States) **J Palmer**	**7^{7}**	**7**

Semifinals
WC	(United States) J-M Gambill (Canada) S Larose	4	4
2	(United States) **D Johnson** (United States) **J Palmer**	**6**	**6**
