= 2000 Heineken Trophy – Women's doubles =

Women's doubles
- 2000 Heineken Trophy

Final
- Champions: (United States) Erika deLone (Australia) Nicole Pratt
- Runners-up: (Australia) Catherine Barclay (Slovakia) Karina Habšudová
- Score: 7–6^{(8–6)}, 4–3, retired

Details
- Draw: 16
- Seeds: 4

Events
Singles	men	women
Doubles	men	women
← 1999 ·	Heineken Trophy	· 2001 →

Silvia Farina Elia and Rita Grande were the defending champions, but Farina Elia did not compete this year. Grande teamed up with Sabine Appelmans and lost in semifinals to Catherine Barclay and Karina Habšudová.

Erika deLone and Nicole Pratt won the title, after Catherine Barclay and Karina Habšudová were forced to retire during the final. The score was 7–6^{(8–6)}, 4–3.

== Seeds ==
1. (Zimbabwe) Cara Black / (United States) Meghann Shaughnessy (first round, withdrew)
2. (Romania) Cătălina Cristea / (Romania) Ruxandra Dragomir (first round)
3. (Netherlands) Kristie Boogert / (Netherlands) Miriam Oremans (semifinals)
4. (Belgium) Sabine Appelmans / (Italy) Rita Grande (semifinals)

== Draw ==
Key

- Q = Qualifier
- WC = Wild card
- LL = Lucky loser
- Alt = Alternate
- ITF = ITF entry
- PR = Protected ranking
- SR = Special ranking
- SE = Special exempt
- JE = Junior exempt
- JR = Junior Accelerator Programme entrant
- CO = College Accelerator Programme entrant
- NG = Next Gen Accelerator Program entrant
- w/o = Walkover
- r = Retired
- d = Defaulted

=== Draw ===
First round
1	(Zimbabwe) C Black (United States) M Shaughnessy
(Belgium) J Henin (Bulgaria) M Maleeva	w	/	o
(Bulgaria) L Bacheva (Netherlands) A Hopmans	6	2	3
(United States) E deLone (Australia) N Pratt	2	6	6
3	(Netherlands) K Boogert (Netherlands) M Oremans	w	/	o
(Switzerland) E Gagliardi (Czech Republic) S Kleinová
(South Africa) K Grant (Russia) N Petrova	w	/	o
(Austria) B Schwartz (Austria) P Wartusch
(United States) J Capriati (Australia) J Dokic	7	6
(Slovakia) H Nagyová (Switzerland) P Schnyder	5	0
(United States) K Brandi (Canada) J Nejedly	3	0
4	(Belgium) S Appelmans (Italy) R Grande	6	6
(Australia) C Barclay (Slovakia) K Habšudová	6	7
(Netherlands) D Haak (Netherlands) A van den Hurk	3	5
(Thailand) B Sangaram (Germany) C Schneider	6	2	6
2	(Romania) C Cristea (Romania) R Dragomir	4	6	3

Quarterfinals
(Belgium) J Henin (Bulgaria) M Maleeva	0	5^{r}
(United States) E deLone (Australia) N Pratt	6	3
3	(Netherlands) K Boogert (Netherlands) M Oremans	7^{9}	7^{7}
(South Africa) K Grant (Russia) N Petrova	6^{7}	6^{5}
(United States) J Capriati (Australia) J Dokic	6^{8}	3
4	(Belgium) S Appelmans (Italy) R Grande	7^{10}	6
(Australia) C Barclay (Slovakia) K Habšudová	6	6
(Thailand) B Sangaram (Germany) C Schneider	3	3

Semifinals
(United States) E deLone (Australia) N Pratt	6	7^{7}
3	(Netherlands) K Boogert (Netherlands) M Oremans	4	6^{3}
4	(Belgium) S Appelmans (Italy) R Grande	6^{6}	6	1
(Australia) C Barclay (Slovakia) K Habšudová	7^{8}	4	6

Final
(United States) E deLone (Australia) N Pratt	7^{8}	4
(Australia) C Barclay (Slovakia) K Habšudová	6^{6}	3^{r}
