= 1999 Heineken Trophy – Women's doubles =

Women's doubles
- 1999 Heineken Trophy

Final
- Champions: (Italy) Silvia Farina (Italy) Rita Grande
- Runners-up: (Zimbabwe) Cara Black (Netherlands) Kristie Boogert
- Score: 7–5, 7–6^{(7–2)}

Events
Singles	men	women
Doubles	men	women
← 1998 ·	Heineken Trophy	· 2000 →

The 1999 Heineken Trophy women's singles was the women's singles event of the tenth edition of the Rosmalen Grass Court Championships, a WTA Tier III tournament held in 's-Hertogenbosch, Netherlands and part of the European grass court season. Sabine Appelmans and Miriam Oremans were the defending champions and third seed, but they were defeated in the first round by Sandra Kleinová and Magdalena Maleeva.

Italians Silvia Farina and Rita Grande won in the final 7–5, 7–6^{(7–2)} against Cara Black and Kristie Boogert.

== Seeds ==
1. (Italy) Silvia Farina / (Italy) Rita Grande (champions)
2. (France) Alexia Dechaume-Balleret / (Belgium) Dominique Van Roost (semifinals)
3. (Belgium) Sabine Appelmans / (Netherlands) Miriam Oremans (first round)
4. (Zimbabwe) Cara Black / (Netherlands) Kristie Boogert (final)

== Draw ==
=== Key ===
- Q = Qualifier
- WC = Wild card
- LL = Lucky loser
- Alt = Alternate
- SE = Special exempt
- PR = Protected ranking
- ITF = ITF entry
- JE = Junior exempt
- w/o = Walkover
- r = Retired
- d = Defaulted
- SR = Special ranking

First round
(Puerto Rico) K Brandi (Spain) M Sánchez Lorenzo	3	1
(Netherlands) A Hopmans (Croatia) S Talaja	6	6
3	(Belgium) S Appelmans (Netherlands) M Oremans	4	6^{3}
(Czech Republic) S Kleinová (Bulgaria) M Maleeva	6	7^{7}
(Belgium) J Henin (Australia) L Pleming	6	3	3
(United States) L Osterloh (United States) M Shaughnessy	3	6	6
(Czech Republic) K Hrdličková (Germany) B Rittner	6^{3}	1
(Slovakia) H Nagyová (France) S Testud	7^{7}	6
(Switzerland) E Gagliardi (France) C Tanvier	1	0
4	(Zimbabwe) C Black (Netherlands) K Boogert	6	6
(South Africa) N de Villiers (Japan) R Hiraki	1	4
(South Africa) J Kruger (China) Li F	6	6

Quarterfinals
1	(Italy) S Farina (Italy) R Grande	6	6
(Netherlands) A Hopmans (Croatia) S Talaja	4	3
(Czech Republic) S Kleinová (Bulgaria) M Maleeva	6^{2}	6	3
(United States) L Osterloh (United States) M Shaughnessy	7^{7}	2	6
(Slovakia) H Nagyová (France) S Testud
4	(Zimbabwe) C Black (Netherlands) K Boogert	w/o
(South Africa) J Kruger (China) Li F	4	2
2	(France) A Dechaume-Balleret (Belgium) D Van Roost	6	6

Semifinals
1	(Italy) S Farina (Italy) R Grande	6	6
(United States) L Osterloh (United States) M Shaughnessy	4	3
4	(Zimbabwe) C Black (Netherlands) K Boogert	6	6
2	(France) A Dechaume-Balleret (Belgium) D Van Roost	4	3

Final
1	(Italy) S Farina (Italy) R Grande	7	7^{7}
4	(Zimbabwe) C Black (Netherlands) K Boogert	5	6^{2}
