= 1999 Heineken Trophy – Women's singles =

Women's singles
- 1999 Heineken Trophy

Final
- Champion: (Puerto Rico) Kristina Brandi
- Runner-up: (Croatia) Silvija Talaja
- Score: 6–0, 3–6, 6–1

Details
- Draw: 30
- Seeds: 8

Events
Singles	men	women
Doubles	men	women
← 1998 ·	Heineken Trophy	· 2000 →

The 1999 Heineken Trophy women's singles was the women's singles event of the tenth edition of the Rosmalen Grass Court Championships, a WTA Tier III tournament held in 's-Hertogenbosch, Netherlands and part of the European grass court season. Julie Halard-Decugis was the defending champion, but she did not compete this year.

Kristina Brandi won in the final, 6–0, 3–6, 6–1, against Silvija Talaja, to win what was her only WTA title.

== Seeds ==
1. (France) Sandrine Testud (second round)
2. (Belgium) Dominique Van Roost (quarterfinals)
3. (France) Julie Halard-Decugis (withdrew)
4. (Italy) Silvia Farina (first round)
5. (Slovakia) Henrieta Nagyová (first round)
6. (Romania) Ruxandra Dragomir (first round)
7. (Germany) Anke Huber (second round)
8. (Zimbabwe) Cara Black (second round)
9. (Germany) Barbara Rittner (second round)

== Draw ==
=== Key ===
- Q = Qualifier
- WC = Wild card
- LL = Lucky loser
- Alt = Alternate
- SE = Special exempt
- PR = Protected ranking
- ITF = ITF entry
- JE = Junior exempt
- w/o = Walkover
- r = Retired
- d = Defaulted
- SR = Special ranking

=== Finals ===
Semifinals
(Croatia) Silvija Talaja	6	6
(Netherlands) Miriam Oremans	3	2
(Bulgaria) Magdalena Maleeva	7^{7}	3	3
(Puerto Rico) Kristina Brandi	6^{4}	6	6

Final
(Croatia) Silvija Talaja	0	6	1
(Puerto Rico) Kristina Brandi	6	3	6

=== Top half ===
First round
(Switzerland) E Gagliardi	6	7^{7}
(Spain) M Sánchez Lorenzo	3	6^{4}
(Netherlands) A Hopmans	5	1
(Croatia) S Talaja	7	6
(China) Li F	2	2
8	(Zimbabwe) C Black	6	6
4	(Italy) S Farina	2	3
(Netherlands) M Oremans	6	6
(Germany) A Glass	1	1
(United States) L Osterloh	6	6
(Czech Republic) K Hrdličková	6^{1}	4
(France) A Dechaume-Balleret	7^{7}	6
(Netherlands) K Boogert	6	4	6
6	(Romania) R Dragomir	3	6	3

Second round
1	(France) S Testud	6	1	4
(Switzerland) E Gagliardi	4	6	6
(Croatia) S Talaja	6^{2}	6	6
8	(Zimbabwe) C Black	7^{7}	4	0
(Netherlands) M Oremans	6	6
(United States) L Osterloh	3	1
(France) A Dechaume-Balleret	1	6^{6}
(Netherlands) K Boogert	6	7^{8}

Quarterfinals
(Switzerland) E Gagliardi	4	7	5
(Croatia) S Talaja	6	5	7
(Netherlands) M Oremans	6	6
(Netherlands) K Boogert	4	3

Semifinals
(Croatia) S Talaja	6	6
(Netherlands) M Oremans	3	2

=== Bottom half ===
First round
7	(Germany) A Huber	2	7	6
(South Africa) J Kruger	6	5	2
(Bulgaria) L Bacheva	1	4
(Bulgaria) M Maleeva	6	6
(Belgium) L Courtois	6	2	6
(Italy) R Grande	3	6	3
(Romania) C Cristea	5	4
9	(Germany) B Rittner	7	6
5	(Slovakia) H Nagyová	0	6	3
(Puerto Rico) K Brandi	6	2	6
(United States) M Shaughnessy	6	7
WC	(Czech Republic) S Kleinová	3	5
(Netherlands) S Noorlander	3	3
(Belgium) S Appelmans	6	6

Second round
7	(Germany) A Huber	1	2
(Bulgaria) M Maleeva	6	6
(Belgium) L Courtois	6	2	6
9	(Germany) B Rittner	4	6	4
(Puerto Rico) K Brandi	6	6
(United States) M Shaughnessy	1	4
(Belgium) S Appelmans	4	4
2	(Belgium) D Van Roost	6	6

Quarterfinals
(Bulgaria) M Maleeva	6	6
(Belgium) L Courtois	2	0
(Puerto Rico) K Brandi	6	6
2	(Belgium) D Van Roost	3	3

Semifinals
(Bulgaria) M Maleeva	7^{7}	3	3
(Puerto Rico) K Brandi	6^{4}	6	6
