= 2001 Heineken Trophy – Women's singles =

Women's singles
- 2001 Heineken Trophy

Final
- Champion: (Belgium) Justine Henin
- Runner-up: (Belgium) Kim Clijsters
- Score: 6–4, 3–6, 6–3

Details
- Draw: 30 (2WC)
- Seeds: 8

Events
Singles	men	women
Doubles	men	women
← 2000 ·	Rosmalen Grass Court Championships	· 2002 →

Martina Hingis was the defending champion, but did not compete this year.

Justine Henin won the title by defeating Kim Clijsters 6–4, 3–6, 6–3 in the final.

== Seeds ==
The first two seeds received a bye into the second round.

1. (Belgium) Kim Clijsters (final)
2. (Belgium) Justine Henin (champion)
3. (Russia) Elena Dementieva (first round)
4. (Federal Republic of Yugoslavia) Jelena Dokic (semifinals)
5. (Slovakia) Henrieta Nagyová (quarterfinals)
6. (Switzerland) Patty Schnyder (first round)
7. (Russia) Tatiana Panova (quarterfinals)
8. (Russia) Lina Krasnoroutskaya (first round)

== Draw ==
=== Key ===
- Q = Qualifier
- WC = Wild card
- LL = Lucky loser
- Alt = Alternate
- SE = Special exempt
- PR = Protected ranking
- ITF = ITF entry
- JE = Junior exempt
- w/o = Walkover
- r = Retired
- d = Defaulted
- SR = Special ranking

=== Finals ===
Semifinals
1	(Belgium) Kim Clijsters	6	6
4	(Federal Republic of Yugoslavia) Jelena Dokic	4	2
(Uzbekistan) Iroda Tulyaganova	3	2
2	(Belgium) Justine Henin	6	6

Final
1	(Belgium) Kim Clijsters	4	6	3
2	(Belgium) Justine Henin	6	3	6

=== Top half ===
First round
(South Africa) J Kruger	6	6
(Spain) C Torrens Valero	3	3
(United States) M Tu	6	6
WC	(Czech Republic) S Kleinová	1	4
(United States) K Brandi	6	3	6
8	(Russia) L Krasnoroutskaya	4	6	3
4	(Federal Republic of Yugoslavia) J Dokic	6	6
(Argentina) M Díaz Oliva	4	2
(Australia) N Pratt	6	3	2
WC	(Netherlands) M Oremans	2	6	6
(Germany) B Rittner	6	4	6
(Germany) J Kandarr	3	6	3
(Czech Republic) D Chládková	6	5	3
5	(Slovakia) H Nagyová	4	7	6

Second round
1	(Belgium) K Clijsters	6	6
(South Africa) J Kruger	3	0
(United States) M Tu	6	6^{2}	2
(United States) K Brandi	2	7^{7}	6
4	(Federal Republic of Yugoslavia) J Dokic	6	6
WC	(Netherlands) M Oremans	2	2
(Germany) B Rittner	3	6^{5}
5	(Slovakia) H Nagyová	6	7^{7}

Quarterfinals
1	(Belgium) K Clijsters	6	6
(United States) K Brandi	3	4
4	(Federal Republic of Yugoslavia) J Dokic	6	6
5	(Slovakia) H Nagyová	2	0

Semifinals
1	(Belgium) K Clijsters	6	6
4	(Federal Republic of Yugoslavia) J Dokic	4	2

=== Bottom half ===
First round
7	(Russia) T Panova	6	4	7
(New Zealand) P Nola	3	6	5
(Israel) A Smashnova	3	5
(Spain) M Marrero	6	7
(Romania) R Dragomir Ilie	6	6
(Italy) R Grande	3	4
(Uzbekistan) I Tulyaganova	7	6
3	(Russia) E Dementieva	5	3
6	(Switzerland) P Schnyder	1	6	1
(Russia) E Bovina	6	2	6
(Germany) M Weingärtner	7	6
(Australia) R McQuillan	5	0
(Russia) N Petrova	3	4
(France) N Dechy	6	6

Second round
7	(Russia) T Panova	6	6
(Spain) M Marrero	3	4
(Romania) R Dragomir Ilie	6^{2}	6	5
(Uzbekistan) I Tulyaganova	7^{7}	3	7
(Russia) E Bovina	6	6
(Germany) M Weingärtner	2	3
(France) N Dechy	2	2
2	(Belgium) J Henin	6	6

Quarterfinals
7	(Russia) T Panova	6	6^{2}	4
(Uzbekistan) I Tulyaganova	1	7^{7}	6
(Russia) E Bovina	4	4
2	(Belgium) J Henin	6	6

Semifinals
(Uzbekistan) I Tulyaganova	3	2
2	(Belgium) J Henin	6	6
