= 2001 Rogers AT&T Cup – Doubles =

Doubles
- 2001 Canada Masters and the Rogers AT&T Cup

Final
- Champions: (United States) Kimberly Po-Messerli (Australia) Nicole Pratt
- Runners-up: (Slovenia) Tina Križan (Slovenia) Katarina Srebotnik
- Score: 6–3, 6–1

Details
- Draw: 28 (2WC/1Q/1LL)
- Seeds: 8

Events
Singles	men	women
Doubles	men	women
- Canada Masters Rogers AT&T Cup

Martina Hingis and Nathalie Tauziat were the defending champions, but chose not to participate that year.

Kimberly Po-Messerli and Nicole Pratt won in the final 6–3, 6–1, against Tina Križan and Katarina Srebotnik.

== Seeds ==
The top four seeds received a bye into the second round.

1. (United States) Lisa Raymond / (Australia) Rennae Stubbs (quarterfinals)
2. (Zimbabwe) Cara Black / (Russia) Elena Likhovtseva (semifinals)
3. (United States) Nicole Arendt / (Netherlands) Caroline Vis (second round)
4. (Federal Republic of Yugoslavia) ~~Jelena Dokic~~ / (Spain) ~~Conchita Martínez~~ (withdrew due to Martinez's achilles injury)
5. (United States) Kimberly Po-Messerli / (Australia) Nicole Pratt (champions)
6. (France) Alexandra Fusai / (Italy) Rita Grande (second round)
7. (United States) Martina Navratilova / (Spain) Arantxa Sánchez Vicario (semifinals)
8. (Germany) Anke Huber / (Austria) Barbara Schett (first round)
9. (Slovenia) Tina Križan / (Slovenia) Katarina Srebotnik (final)

== Draw ==
Key

- Q = Qualifier
- WC = Wild card
- LL = Lucky loser
- Alt = Alternate
- ITF = ITF entry
- PR = Protected ranking
- SR = Special ranking
- SE = Special exempt
- JE = Junior exempt
- JR = Junior Accelerator Programme entrant
- CO = College Accelerator Programme entrant
- NG = Next Gen Accelerator Program entrant
- w/o = Walkover
- r = Retired
- d = Defaulted

=== Finals ===
Semifinals
7	(United States) Martina Navratilova (Spain) Arantxa Sánchez Vicario	3	6	4
9	(Slovenia) Tina Križan (Slovenia) Katarina Srebotnik	6	2	6
5	(United States) Kimberly Po-Messerli (Australia) Nicole Pratt	7	6
2	(Zimbabwe) Cara Black (Russia) Elena Likhovtseva	6^{1}	4

Final
9	(Slovenia) Tina Križan (Slovenia) Katarina Srebotnik	3	1
5	(United States) Kimberly Po-Messerli (Australia) Nicole Pratt	6	6

=== Top half ===
First round
(South Africa) A Coetzer (United States) L McNeil	4	6	6
(Spain) V Ruano Pascual (Argentina) ME Salerni	6	3	1
(Czech Republic) K Hrdličková (Germany) B Rittner	6	4	6
(Spain) M Serna (Argentina) P Tarabini	1	6	2
(Croatia) I Majoli (Slovakia) H Nagyová	3	5
7	(United States) M Navratilova (Spain) A Sánchez Vicario	6	7
WC	(Canada) M Drake (Canada) R Kolbovic	3	4
(Japan) A Sugiyama (Uzbekistan) I Tulyaganova	6	6
(France) É Loit (Kazakhstan) I Selyutina	5	6	7
WC	(Canada) M-È Pelletier (Canada) V Webb	7	3	6^{4}
(Indonesia) Y Basuki (Indonesia) W Prakusya	5	5
9	(Slovenia) T Križan (Slovenia) K Srebotnik	7	7

Second round
1	(United States) L Raymond (Australia) R Stubbs	6	6
(South Africa) A Coetzer (United States) L McNeil	4	4
(Czech Republic) K Hrdličková (Germany) B Rittner	2	6	4
7	(United States) M Navratilova (Spain) A Sánchez Vicario	6	3	6
3	(United States) N Arendt (Netherlands) C Vis	2	5
(Japan) A Sugiyama (Uzbekistan) I Tulyaganova	6	7
(France) É Loit (Kazakhstan) I Selyutina	3	2
9	(Slovenia) T Križan (Slovenia) K Srebotnik	6	6

Quarterfinals
1	(United States) L Raymond (Australia) R Stubbs	3	2
7	(United States) M Navratilova (Spain) A Sánchez Vicario	6	6
(Japan) A Sugiyama (Uzbekistan) I Tulyaganova	6^{6}	5
9	(Slovenia) T Križan (Slovenia) K Srebotnik	7	7

Semifinals
7	(United States) M Navratilova (Spain) A Sánchez Vicario	3	6	4
9	(Slovenia) T Križan (Slovenia) K Srebotnik	6	2	6

=== Bottom half ===
First round
8	(Germany) A Huber (Austria) B Schett	4	4
(France) S Testud (Italy) R Vinci	6	6
(South Africa) L Huber (Argentina) L Montalvo	6	3	3
(Belgium) J Henin (United States) M Shaughnessy	3	6	6
(United States) A Frazier (United States) K Schlukebir	1	2
(Japan) N Miyagi (Australia) L McShea	6	6
6	(France) A Fusai (Italy) R Grande	6	6
Q	(Australia) E Dominikovic (United States) M Irvin	3	3
(Japan) R Hiraki (Canada) S Jeyaseelan	5	2
(Slovakia) D Hantuchová (Russia) N Petrova	7	6
(Bulgaria) M Maleeva (France) A-G Sidot	5	6	6
LL	(Russia) E Bovina (Australia) A Molik	7	2	4

Second round
(France) S Testud (Italy) R Vinci	5	6	6^{4}
(Belgium) J Henin (United States) M Shaughnessy	7	2	7
(Japan) N Miyagi (Australia) L McShea	6	1	2
5	(United States) K Po-Messerli (Australia) N Pratt	2	6	6
6	(France) A Fusai (Italy) R Grande	2	6	2
(Slovakia) D Hantuchová (Russia) N Petrova	6	4	6
(Bulgaria) M Maleeva (France) A-G Sidot
2	(Zimbabwe) C Black (Russia) E Likovtseva	w/o

Quarterfinals
(Belgium) J Henin (United States) M Shaughnessy	3	6	3
5	(United States) K Po-Messerli (Australia) N Pratt	6	3	6
(Slovakia) D Hantuchová (Russia) N Petrova	7	2	4
2	(Zimbabwe) C Black (Russia) E Likovtseva	5	6	6

Semifinals
5	(United States) K Po-Messerli (Australia) N Pratt	7	6
2	(Zimbabwe) C Black (Russia) E Likovtseva	6^{1}	4

== Qualifying ==
=== Qualifying seeds ===
1. (Argentina) Mariana Díaz Oliva / (Germany) Marlene Weingärtner (first round)
2. (Russia) Elena Dementieva / (Russia) Lina Krasnoroutskaya (first round)

=== Qualifiers ===
1. (Australia) Evie Dominikovic / (United States) Marissa Irvin

=== Lucky losers ===
1. (Russia) Elena Bovina / (Australia) Alicia Molik

=== Qualifying draw ===
First round
1	(Argentina) Mariana Díaz Oliva (Germany) Marlene Weingärtner	2
(United States) Jill Craybas (Russia) Anastasia Myskina	8
(Australia) Evie Dominikovic (United States) Marissa Irvin	8
(Czech Republic) Dája Bedáňová (United States) Jennifer Hopkins	2
(United States) Erika deLone (United States) Samantha Reeves	8
WC	(Canada) Mélanie Marois (Canada) Diana Srebrovic	3
(Russia) Elena Bovina (Australia) Alicia Molik	8
2	(Russia) Elena Dementieva (Russia) Lina Krasnoroutskaya	6

Second round
(United States) Jill Craybas (Russia) Anastasia Myskina	7
(Australia) Evie Dominikovic (United States) Marissa Irvin	9
(United States) Erika deLone (United States) Samantha Reeves	3
(Russia) Elena Bovina (Australia) Alicia Molik	8

Qualifying competition
(Australia) Evie Dominikovic (United States) Marissa Irvin	6	5	6
(Russia) Elena Bovina (Australia) Alicia Molik	4	7	4
