= 1998 Heineken Trophy – Women's singles =

Women's singles
- 1998 Heineken Trophy

Final
- Champion: (France) Julie Halard-Decugis
- Runner-up: (Netherlands) Miriam Oremans
- Score: 6–3, 6–4

Details
- Draw: 30 (2WC/4Q)
- Seeds: 8

Events
Singles	men	women
Doubles	men	women
← 1997 ·	Rosmalen Grass Court Championships	· 1999 →

Ruxandra Dragomir was the defending champion but lost in the first round to Julie Halard-Decugis.

Halard-Decugis won in the final 6–3, 6–4 against Miriam Oremans.

== Seeds ==
A champion seed is indicated in bold text while text in italics indicates the round in which that seed was eliminated. The top two seeds received a bye to the second round.

1. (South Africa) Amanda Coetzer (second round)
2. (France) Sandrine Testud (semifinals)
3. (Belgium) Dominique Van Roost (first round)
4. (Belgium) Sabine Appelmans (quarterfinals)
5. (Romania) Ruxandra Dragomir (first round)
6. (France) Amélie Mauresmo (first round)
7. (United States) Corina Morariu (second round)
8. (Spain) Gala León García (quarterfinals)

== Draw ==
=== Key ===
- Q = Qualifier
- WC = Wild card
- LL = Lucky loser
- Alt = Alternate
- SE = Special exempt
- PR = Protected ranking
- ITF = ITF entry
- JE = Junior exempt
- w/o = Walkover
- r = Retired
- d = Defaulted
- SR = Special ranking

=== Final ===
Final
(Netherlands) Miriam Oremans	3	4
(France) **Julie Halard-Decugis**	**6**	**6**

=== Section 1 ===
First round
(Germany) A Glass	5	6
(United States) **K Po**	**7**	**7**
Q	(Japan) **Y Yoshida**	**6**	**7**
(Czech Republic) D Chládková	4	5
(United States) **C Rubin**	**6**	**6**
6	(France) A Mauresmo	1	4
3	(Belgium) D Van Roost	3	6
(Netherlands) **M Oremans**	**6**	**7**
(Chinese Taipei) S-T Wang	3	2
Q	(France) **A Dechaume-Balleret**	**6**	**6**
WC	(Netherlands) **K Boogert**	**6**	**6**
(Slovakia) K Habšudová	1	2
WC	(Slovenia) T Pisnik	3	0
7	(United States) **C Morariu**	**6**	**6**

Second round
1	(South Africa) A Coetzer	4	2
(United States) **K Po**	**6**	**6**
Q	(Japan) Y Yoshida	5	4
(United States) **C Rubin**	**7**	**6**
(Netherlands) **M Oremans**	**7**	6	**6**
Q	(France) A Dechaume-Balleret	6	**7**	2
WC	(Netherlands) **K Boogert**	4	**6**	**7**
7	(United States) C Morariu	**6**	2	5

Quarterfinals
(United States) **K Po**	**6**	**6**
(United States) C Rubin	2	3
(Netherlands) **M Oremans**	**6**	2	**6**
WC	(Netherlands) K Boogert	3	**6**	4

Semifinals
(United States) K Po	1	**7**	6
(Netherlands) **M Oremans**	**6**	6	**7**

=== Section 2 ===
First round
5	(Romania) R Dragomir	6	3
(France) **J Halard-Decugis**	**7**	**6**
(Czech Republic) S Kleinová	0	**6**	1
(United States) **T Snyder**	**6**	4	**6**
(Czech Republic) **A Gerši**	**6**	**6**
(Czech Republic) K Hrdličková	1	4
(Spain) C Torrens Valero	2	1
4	(Belgium) **S Appelmans**	**6**	**6**
8	(Spain) **G León García**	**6**	**6**
(Argentina) F Labat	4	1
Q	(Austria) **P Wartusch**	**7**	1	**6**
(Romania) C Cristea	6	**6**	4
(Spain) M Sánchez Lorenzo	2	3
Q	(Italy) **L Golarsa**	**6**	**6**

Second round
(France) **J Halard-Decugis**	**6**	**6**
(United States) T Snyder	2	0
(Czech Republic) A Gerši	3	2
4	(Belgium) **S Appelmans**	**6**	**6**
8	(Spain) **G León García**	4	**7**	**7**
Q	(Austria) P Wartusch	**6**	6	6
Q	(Italy) L Golarsa	3	4
2	(France) **S Testud**	**6**	**6**

Quarterfinals
(France) **J Halard-Decugis**	6	**7**	**6**
4	(Belgium) S Appelmans	**7**	6	3
8	(Spain) G León García	6	4
2	(France) **S Testud**	**7**	**6**

Semifinals
(France) **J Halard-Decugis**	**6**	**6**
2	(France) S Testud	3	3
