= 1998 Heineken Trophy – Women's doubles =

Women's doubles
- 1998 Heineken Trophy

Final
- Champions: (Belgium) Sabine Appelmans (Netherlands) Miriam Oremans
- Runners-up: (Romania) Cătălina Cristea (Czech Republic) Eva Melicharová
- Score: 6–7^{(4–7)}, 7–6^{(8–6)}, 7–6^{(7–5)}

Details
- Draw: 16 (1WC)
- Seeds: 4

Events
Singles	men	women
Doubles	men	women
← 1997 ·	Rosmalen Grass Court Championships	· 1999 →

Eva Melicharová and Helena Vildová were the defending champions but they competed with different partners that year, Melicharova with Cătălina Cristea and Vildova with Karina Habšudová.

Habšudová and Vildova lost in the first round to Amanda Coetzer and Sandrine Testud.

Cristea and Melicharova lost in the final 6–7^{(4–7)}, 7–6^{(8–6)}, 7–6^{(7–5)} against Sabine Appelmans and Miriam Oremans.

== Seeds ==
Champion seeds are indicated in bold text while text in italics indicates the round in which those seeds were eliminated.

1. (Belgium) **Sabine Appelmans** / (Netherlands) **Miriam Oremans (champions)**
2. (United States) Debbie Graham / (United States) Kimberly Po (first round)
3. (Argentina) Florencia Labat / (Belgium) Dominique Van Roost (quarterfinals)
4. (Romania) Ruxandra Dragomir / (United States) Corina Morariu (quarterfinals)

== Draw ==
=== Key ===
- Q = Qualifier
- WC = Wild card
- LL = Lucky loser
- Alt = Alternate
- SE = Special exempt
- PR = Protected ranking
- ITF = ITF entry
- JE = Junior exempt
- w/o = Walkover
- r = Retired
- d = Defaulted
- SR = Special ranking

First round
1	(Belgium) **S Appelmans** (Netherlands) **M Oremans**	**6**	**6**
(United States) T Snyder (Japan) Y Yoshida	3	4
(Germany) A Glass (Czech Republic) S Kleinová	3	3
(United States) **R Jensen** (Australia) **D Jones**	**6**	**6**
4	(Romania) **R Dragomir** (United States) **C Morariu**	**6**	**6**
(Italy) L Golarsa (Chinese Taipei) S-T Wang	1	4
(Slovakia) K Habšudová (Czech Republic) H Vildová	2	2
(South Africa) **A Coetzer** (France) **S Testud**	**6**	**6**
(Germany) C Schneider (Austria) P Wartusch	4	2
(France) **J Halard-Decugis** (United States) **C Rubin**	**6**	**6**
(Spain) G León García (Spain) C Torrens Valero	3	2
3	(Argentina) **F Labat** (Belgium) **D Van Roost**	**6**	**6**
WC	(Netherlands) D Haak (Netherlands) A Mikkers	6^{4}	1
(Romania) **C Cristea** (Czech Republic) **E Melicharová**	**7^{7}**	**6**
(France) **A Dechaume-Balleret** (France) **A Mauresmo**	**6**	**6**
2	(United States) D Graham (United States) K Po	1	3

Quarterfinals
1	(Belgium) **S Appelmans** (Netherlands) **M Oremans**	**6**	**6**
(United States) R Jensen (Australia) D Jones	4	2
4	(Romania) R Dragomir (United States) C Morariu	2	3
(South Africa) **A Coetzer** (France) **S Testud**	**6**	**6**
(France) **J Halard-Decugis** (United States) **C Rubin**	**6**	**6**
3	(Argentina) F Labat (Belgium) D Van Roost	4	1
(Romania) **C Cristea** (Czech Republic) **E Melicharová**	6^{5}	**6**	**6**
(France) A Dechaume-Balleret (France) A Mauresmo	**7^{7}**	3	2

Semifinals
1	(Belgium) **S Appelmans** (Netherlands) **M Oremans**	**w/o**
(South Africa) A Coetzer (France) S Testud
(France) J Halard-Decugis (United States) C Rubin
(Romania) **C Cristea** (Czech Republic) **E Melicharová**	**w/o**

Final
1	(Belgium) **Sabine Appelmans** (Netherlands) **Miriam Oremans**	6^{4}	**7^{8}**	**7^{7}**
(Romania) Cătălina Cristea (Czech Republic) Eva Melicharová	**7^{7}**	6^{6}	6^{5}
