= 2001 Heineken Trophy – Men's singles =

Men's singles
- 2001 Heineken Trophy

Final
- Champion: (Australia) Lleyton Hewitt
- Runner-up: (Argentina) Guillermo Cañas
- Score: 6–3, 6–4

Details
- Draw: 32 (4 Q / 3 WC )
- Seeds: 8

Events
Singles	men	women
Doubles	men	women
- Heineken Trophy

Patrick Rafter was the defending champion but lost in the first round to Peter Wessels.

Lleyton Hewitt won in the final 6–3, 6–4 against Guillermo Cañas.

== Seeds ==
A champion seed is indicated in bold text while text in italics indicates the round in which that seed was eliminated.

1. (Australia) **Lleyton Hewitt (champion)**
2. (Australia) Patrick Rafter (first round)
3. (France) Arnaud Clément (first round)
4. (Switzerland) Roger Federer (semifinals)
5. (Slovakia) Dominik Hrbatý (first round)
6. (Morocco) Hicham Arazi (second round)
7. (Netherlands) Sjeng Schalken (quarterfinals)
8. (Belarus) Vladimir Voltchkov (first round)

== Draw ==
Key

- Q = Qualifier
- WC = Wild card
- LL = Lucky loser
- Alt = Alternate
- ITF = ITF entry
- PR = Protected ranking
- SR = Special ranking
- SE = Special exempt
- JE = Junior exempt
- JR = Junior Accelerator Programme entrant
- CO = College Accelerator Programme entrant
- NG = Next Gen Accelerator Program entrant
- w/o = Walkover
- r = Retired
- d = Defaulted

First round
1	(Australia) **L Hewitt**	**6**	**6**
(Italy) D Sanguinetti	2	1
(Belarus) M Mirnyi	6^{5}	6^{3}
WC	(Croatia) **G Ivanišević**	**7^{7}**	**7^{7}**
(Sweden) **M Gustafsson**	**7**	**6**
WC	(Netherlands) D van Scheppingen	5	3
Q	(Belgium) **G Elseneer**	5	**7**	**6**
8	(Belarus) V Voltchkov	**7**	5	0
4	(Switzerland) **R Federer**	**7^{7}**	**6**
(France) A Dupuis	6^{3}	4
(Czech Republic) M Damm	5	6^{4}
WC	(Netherlands) **J van Lottum**	**7**	**7^{7}**
(Netherlands) **R Sluiter**	**6**	**6**
(France) J Golmard	0	4
(France) **N Escudé**	4	**7^{7}**	**6**
5	(Slovakia) D Hrbatý	**6**	6^{3}	3
6	(Morocco) **H Arazi**	**6**	**6**
Q	(Australia) D Petrovic	3	2
(Argentina) **G Cañas**	**6**	**6**
Q	(United States) K Capalik	3	3
Q	(Switzerland) **Y Allegro**	6^{9}	**6**	**6**
(Australia) A Ilie	**7^{11}**	1	1
(Belgium) **X Malisse**	**6**	**6**
3	(France) A Clément	4	4
7	(Netherlands) **S Schalken**	**6**	**6**
(Netherlands) J Siemerink	3	4
(Czech Republic) **T Zíb**	**6**	**6**
(Netherlands) E Kempes	4	1
(Spain) **T Robredo**	**6**	**6**
(Belgium) O Rochus	4	1
(Netherlands) **P Wessels**	**7**	**6**
2	(Australia) P Rafter	5	4

Second round
1	(Australia) **L Hewitt**	**6**	**7**
WC	(Croatia) G Ivanišević	4	5
(Sweden) M Gustafsson	4	**7^{7}**	0
Q	(Belgium) **G Elseneer**	**6**	6^{0}	**6**
4	(Switzerland) **R Federer**	**6**	**6**
WC	(Netherlands) J van Lottum	0	1
(Netherlands) **R Sluiter**	4
(France) N Escudé	1^{r}
6	(Morocco) H Arazi	3	3
(Argentina) **G Cañas**	**6**	**6**
Q	(Switzerland) Y Allegro	5	4
(Belgium) **X Malisse**	**7**	**6**
7	(Netherlands) **S Schalken**	**7^{8}**	**6**
(Czech Republic) T Zíb	6^{6}	3
(Spain) **T Robredo**	**7^{7}**	**6**
(Netherlands) P Wessels	6^{3}	4

Quarterfinals
1	(Australia) **L Hewitt**	**6**	**6**
Q	(Belgium) G Elseneer	2	4
4	(Switzerland) **R Federer**	6^{4}	**6**	**6**
(Netherlands) R Sluiter	**7^{7}**	4	4
(Argentina) **G Cañas**	**6**	**6**
(Belgium) X Malisse	3	4
7	(Netherlands) S Schalken	3	4
(Spain) **T Robredo**	**6**	**6**

Semifinals
1	(Australia) **L Hewitt**	**6**	**6**
4	(Switzerland) R Federer	4	2
(Argentina) **G Cañas**	**7**	**6**
(Spain) T Robredo	5	4

Final
1	(Australia) **Lleyton Hewitt**	**6**	**6**
(Argentina) Guillermo Cañas	3	4
