= 2001 Heineken Trophy – Men's doubles =

Men's doubles
- 2001 Heineken Trophy

Final
- Champions: (Netherlands) Paul Haarhuis (Netherlands) Sjeng Schalken
- Runners-up: (Czech Republic) Martin Damm (Czech Republic) Cyril Suk
- Score: 6–4, 6–4

Events
| Singles | men | women |
| Doubles | men | women |
| ← 2000 · | Heineken Trophy | · 2002 → |

Martin Damm and Cyril Suk were the defending champions but lost in the final 6–4, 6–4 against Paul Haarhuis and Sjeng Schalken.

== Seeds ==
Champion seeds are indicated in bold text while text in italics indicates the round in which those seeds were eliminated.

1. (Czech Republic) Tomáš Cibulec / (Czech Republic) Leoš Friedl (first round)
2. (South Africa) Chris Haggard / (Belgium) Tom Vanhoudt (quarterfinals)
3. (Netherlands) **Paul Haarhuis** / (Netherlands) **Sjeng Schalken (champions)**
4. (Australia) David Macpherson / (South Africa) Grant Stafford (first round)

== Draw ==
=== Key ===
- Q = Qualifier
- WC = Wild card
- LL = Lucky loser
- Alt = Alternate
- SE = Special exempt
- PR = Protected ranking
- ITF = ITF entry
- JE = Junior exempt
- w/o = Walkover
- r = Retired
- d = Defaulted
- SR = Special ranking

First round
1 | (Czech Republic) T Cibulec (Czech Republic) L Friedl | **6** | 3 | 1
(Sweden) **S Aspelin** (Sweden) **J Landsberg** | 3 | **6** | **6**
(United States) J Waite (South Africa) J Weir-Smith | **6** | 4 | 4
WC | (Belarus) **M Mirnyi** (Belarus) **V Voltchkov** | 2 | **6** | **6**
3 | (Netherlands) **P Haarhuis** (Netherlands) **S Schalken** | **6** | 4 | **7^{7}**
(France) A Clément (France) N Escudé | 4 | **6** | 6^{4}
(South Africa) R Koenig (United States) M Sprengelmeyer | **6** | 3 | 4
(South Africa) **M Barnard** (United States) **J Thomas** | 3 | **6** | **6**
WC | (Netherlands) **R Sluiter** (Netherlands) **P Wessels** | 5 | **6** | **6**
Q | (Czech Republic) D Vacek (Netherlands) D van Scheppingen | **7** | 3 | 3
(Japan) **T Shimada** (South Africa) **M Wakefield** | **6** | **6**
4 | (Australia) D Macpherson (South Africa) G Stafford | 4 | 4
(Czech Republic) **M Damm** (Czech Republic) **C Suk** | **6** | **7^{7}**
WC | (Netherlands) E Kempes (Netherlands) J van Lottum | 3 | 6^{3}
(Slovakia) D Hrbatý (Netherlands) J Siemerink | **6** | 3 | 5
2 | (South Africa) **C Haggard** (Belgium) **T Vanhoudt** | 4 | **6** | **7**

Quarterfinals
(Sweden) S Aspelin (Sweden) J Landsberg | 3 | 4
WC | (Belarus) **M Mirnyi** (Belarus) **V Voltchkov** | **6** | **6**
3 | (Netherlands) **P Haarhuis** (Netherlands) **S Schalken** | **7^{7}** | 4 | **6**
(South Africa) M Barnard (United States) J Thomas | 6^{5} | **6** | 1
WC | (Netherlands) R Sluiter (Netherlands) P Wessels | 4 | 0^{r}
(Japan) **T Shimada** (South Africa) **M Wakefield** | **6** | 1
(Czech Republic) **M Damm** (Czech Republic) **C Suk** | 3 | **6** | **7^{7}**
2 | (South Africa) C Haggard (Belgium) T Vanhoudt | **6** | 3 | 6^{2}

Semifinals
WC | (Belarus) M Mirnyi (Belarus) V Voltchkov | 2 | **7^{7}** | 2
3 | (Netherlands) **P Haarhuis** (Netherlands) **S Schalken** | **6** | 6^{4} | **6**
(Japan) T Shimada (South Africa) M Wakefield | 5 | 3
(Czech Republic) **M Damm** (Czech Republic) **C Suk** | **7** | **6**

Final
3 | (Netherlands) **Paul Haarhuis** (Netherlands) **Sjeng Schalken** | **6** | **6**
(Czech Republic) Martin Damm (Czech Republic) Cyril Suk | 4 | 4
