= 2001 Heineken Trophy – Women's doubles =

Women's doubles
- 2001 Heineken Trophy

Final
- Champions: (Romania) Ruxandra Dragomir Ilie (Russia) Nadia Petrova
- Runners-up: (Belgium) Kim Clijsters (Netherlands) Miriam Oremans
- Score: 7–6^{(7–5)}, 6–7^{(5–7)}, 6–4

Details
- Draw: 16 (1WC)
- Seeds: 4

Events
Singles	men	women
Doubles	men	women
← 2000 ·	Rosmalen Grass Court Championships	· 2002 →

The 2001 Heineken Trophy women's doubles tennis tournament was won by Ruxandra Dragomir Ilie and Nadia Petrova. They defeated Kim Clijsters and Miriam Oremans 7–6^{(7–5)}, 6–7^{(5–7)}, 6–4 in the final. Erika deLone and Nicole Pratt were the defending champions, but deLone did not compete that year. Pratt partnered with Rachel McQuillan and they lost in the quarterfinals to Ilie and Petrova.

== Seeds ==
1. (Italy) Rita Grande / (Germany) Barbara Rittner (first round)
2. (Slovenia) Tina Križan / (Uzbekistan) Iroda Tulyaganova (first round)
3. (Belgium) Kim Clijsters / (Netherlands) Miriam Oremans (final)
4. (Australia) Rachel McQuillan / (Australia) Nicole Pratt (quarterfinals)

== Draw ==
=== Key ===
- Q = Qualifier
- WC = Wild card
- LL = Lucky loser
- Alt = Alternate
- SE = Special exempt
- PR = Protected ranking
- ITF = ITF entry
- JE = Junior exempt
- w/o = Walkover
- r = Retired
- d = Defaulted
- SR = Special ranking

=== Draw ===
First round
1	(Italy) R Grande (Germany) B Rittner	5	2
(South Africa) K Grant (Germany) M Weingärtner	7	6
(France) N Dechy (Slovakia) H Nagyová	6	6
(Argentina) M Díaz Oliva (Russia) T Panova	2	2
3	(Belgium) K Clijsters (Netherlands) M Oremans	6	6
(Russia) E Bovina (Russia) L Krasnoroutskaya	3	3
(Russia) E Dementieva (Federal Republic of Yugoslavia) J Dokic	6	6
(Germany) B Lamade (Switzerland) P Schnyder	1	4
(Romania) R Dragomir Ilie (Russia) N Petrova	6	6
(Bulgaria) L Bacheva (Spain) C Torrens Valero	2	2
(South Africa) N de Villiers (Australia) T Musgrave	4	3
4	(Australia) R McQuillan (Australia) N Pratt	6	6
WC	(Germany) J Kandarr (South Africa) J Kruger	3	2
(Spain) MJ Martínez (Spain) A Medina Garrigues	6	6
(Germany) A Glass (United States) M Tu	6	2	6
2	(Slovenia) T Križan (Uzbekistan) I Tulyaganova	0	6	3

Quarterfinals
(South Africa) K Grant (Germany) M Weingärtner	5	2
(France) N Dechy (Slovakia) H Nagyová	7	6
3	(Belgium) K Clijsters (Netherlands) M Oremans	7	6
(Russia) E Dementieva (Federal Republic of Yugoslavia) J Dokic	5	4
(Romania) R Dragomir Ilie (Russia) N Petrova	7^{8}	6^{7}	7^{7}
4	(Australia) R McQuillan (Australia) N Pratt	6^{6}	7^{9}	6^{2}
(Spain) MJ Martínez (Spain) A Medina Garrigues	0	6	3
(Germany) A Glass (United States) M Tu	6	2	6

Semifinals
(France) N Dechy (Slovakia) H Nagyová	3	3
3	(Belgium) K Clijsters (Netherlands) M Oremans	6	6
(Romania) R Dragomir Ilie (Russia) N Petrova	6	6
(Germany) A Glass (United States) M Tu	0	3

Final
3	(Belgium) K Clijsters (Netherlands) M Oremans	6^{5}	7^{7}	4
(Romania) R Dragomir Ilie (Russia) N Petrova	7^{7}	6^{5}	6
