= 2001 Canada Masters – Singles =

Singles
- 2001 Canada Masters and the Rogers AT&T Cup

Final
- Champion: (Romania) Andrei Pavel
- Runner-up: (Australia) Patrick Rafter
- Score: 7–6^{(7–3)}, 2–6, 6–3

Details
- Draw: 64
- Seeds: 16

Events
Singles	men	women
Doubles	men	women
- Canada Masters Rogers AT&T Cup

Andrei Pavel defeated Patrick Rafter in the final, 7–6^{(7–3)}, 2–6, 6–3 to win the men's singles tennis title at the 2001 Canadian Open.

Marat Safin was the defending champion, but lost in the first round to Nicolas Escudé.

== Seeds ==
A champion seed is indicated in bold text while text in italics indicates the round in which that seed was eliminated.

1. (Brazil) Gustavo Kuerten (third round)
2. (Russia) Marat Safin (first round, retired due to a knee injury)
3. (United States) Andre Agassi (first round)
4. (Spain) Juan Carlos Ferrero (quarterfinals)
5. (Australia) Lleyton Hewitt (second round)
6. (Russia) Yevgeny Kafelnikov (first round)
7. (United Kingdom) Tim Henman (second round)
8. (Spain) ~~Àlex Corretja~~ (withdrew)
9. (Australia) Patrick Rafter (final)
10. (France) Arnaud Clément (quarterfinals)
11. (United States) ~~Pete Sampras~~ (withdrew)
12. (Sweden) Thomas Enqvist (first round)
13. (Sweden) Thomas Johansson (second round)
14. (Spain) Carlos Moyá (second round)
15. (South Africa) Wayne Ferreira (first round)
16. (United States) Jan-Michael Gambill (third round)
17. (Slovakia) Dominik Hrbatý (second round)

== Draw ==
Key

- Q = Qualifier
- WC = Wild card
- LL = Lucky loser
- Alt = Alternate
- ITF = ITF entry
- PR = Protected ranking
- SR = Special ranking
- SE = Special exempt
- JE = Junior exempt
- JR = Junior Accelerator Programme entrant
- CO = College Accelerator Programme entrant
- NG = Next Gen Accelerator Program entrant
- w/o = Walkover
- r = Retired
- d = Defaulted

=== Finals ===
Quarterfinals
(United States) Andy Roddick	4	**7^{7}**	3
**(Romania) Andrei Pavel**	**6**	6^{2}	**6**
**(Germany) Tommy Haas**	**6**	**6**
10	(France) Arnaud Clément	2	4
9	**(Australia) Patrick Rafter**	**7**	4	**6**
4	(Spain) Juan Carlos Ferrero	5	**6**	2
**(France) Fabrice Santoro**	**6**	4	**6**
(Czech Republic) Bohdan Ulihrach	3	**6**	1

Semifinals
(Romania) **Andrei Pavel**	**6**	5
(Germany) Tommy Haas	4	0^{r}
9	(Australia) **Patrick Rafter**	**6**	**6**
(France) Fabrice Santoro	2	2

Final
(Romania) **Andrei Pavel**	**7^{7}**	2	**6**
9	(Australia) Patrick Rafter	6^{3}	**6**	3

=== Top half ===
==== Section 1 ====
First round
1	(Brazil) **G Kuerten**	4	**6**	**6**
Q	(Haiti) R Agénor	**6**	4	3
(Australia) W Arthurs	6^{4}	6^{2}
(Argentina) **G Gaudio**	**7^{7}**	**7^{7}**
(South Korea) H-T Lee	3	2
(United States) **A Roddick**	**6**	**6**
(United Kingdom) G Rusedski	3	**6**	4
14	(Spain) **C Moyá**	**6**	4	**6**
LL	(United Kingdom) J Delgado	5	4
(Spain) **F Clavet**	**7**	**6**
(Belgium) X Malisse	6^{5}	**6**	3
(Romania) **A Pavel**	**7^{7}**	2	**6**
(Morocco) **H Arazi**	**6**	**6**
Q	(United States) M Russell	4	3
WC	(Canada) S Larose	0	**7**	3
5	(Australia) **L Hewitt**	**6**	5	**6**

Second round
1	(Brazil) **G Kuerten**	**6**	**6**
(Argentina) G Gaudio	1	4
(United States) **A Roddick**	**6**	5	**7**
14	(Spain) C Moyá	3	**7**	5
(Spain) F Clavet	5	4
(Romania) **A Pavel**	**7**	**6**
(Morocco) **H Arazi**	**6**	**6**
5	(Australia) L Hewitt	1	4

Third round
1	(Brazil) G Kuerten	**7^{7}**	4	2
(United States) **A Roddick**	6^{4}	**6**	**6**
(Romania) **A Pavel**	**6**	**6**
(Morocco) H Arazi	0	2

Quarterfinals
(United States) A Roddick	4	**7^{7}**	3
(Romania) **A Pavel**	**6**	6^{2}	**6**

==== Section 2 ====
First round
3	(United States) A Agassi	2	4
Q	(Croatia) **I Ljubičić**	**6**	**6**
(Germany) **T Haas**	**6**	**6**
(Spain) Á Calatrava	4	3
(Zimbabwe) B Black	2	2
(France) **J Golmard**	**6**	**6**
Q	(United States) C Woodruff	6^{12}	1
13	(Sweden) **T Johansson**	**7^{14}**	**6**
10	(France) **A Clément**	**6**	4	**6**
Q	(United States) C Mamiit	1	**6**	4
(Belarus) **M Mirnyi**	**6**	2	**6**
WC	(Canada) F Niemeyer	3	**6**	1
(United States) M Chang	2	3
(Spain) **A Martín**	**6**	**6**
WC	(Canada) D Nestor	6^{6}	4
17	(Slovakia) **D Hrbatý**	**7^{8}**	**6**

Second round
Q	(Croatia) I Ljubičić	6^{6}	4
(Germany) **T Haas**	**7^{8}**	**6**
(France) **J Golmard**	**6**	**6**
12	(Sweden) T Johansson	4	3
10	(France) **A Clément**	**6**	**6**
(Belarus) M Mirnyi	1	2
(Spain) **A Martín**	6^{5}	**7**	**6**
17	(Slovakia) D Hrbatý	**7^{7}**	5	4

Third round
(Germany) **T Haas**	6^{4}	**6**	**7^{7}**
(France) J Golmard	**7^{7}**	4	6^{5}
10	(France) **A Clément**	**6**	3	**6**
(Spain) A Martín	3	**6**	0

Quarterfinals
(Germany) **T Haas**	**6**	**6**
10	(France) A Clément	2	4

=== Bottom half ===
==== Section 3 ====
First round
6	(Russia) Y Kafelnikov	**6**	6^{3}	4
(United States) **T Martin**	3	**7^{7}**	**6**
(Argentina) F Squillari	**7^{7}**	2	3
(Spain) **F Vicente**	6^{5}	**6**	**6**
(Australia) A Ilie	4	**6**	3
(Sweden) **M Norman**	**6**	3	**6**
(Israel) H Levy	**7^{7}**	3	3
9	(Australia) **P Rafter**	6^{5}	**6**	**6**
16	(United States) **J-M Gambill**	**6**	**6**
(Netherlands) S Schalken	1	4
(Germany) D Prinosil	1	6^{2}
Q	(Israel) **N Behr**	**6**	**7^{7}**
(Sweden) J Björkman	2	**7**	4
(Ecuador) **N Lapentti**	**6**	5	**6**
(Czech Republic) J Novák	3	4
4	(Spain) **J C Ferrero**	**6**	**6**

Second round
(United States) **T Martin**	**6**	1	**6**
(Spain) F Vicente	4	**6**	2
(Sweden) M Norman	1	6^{2}
9	(Australia) **P Rafter**	**6**	**7^{7}**
16	(United States) **J-M Gambill**	**6**	**7^{9}**
Q	(Israel) N Behr	3	6^{7}
(Ecuador) N Lapentti	3	3
4	(Spain) **J C Ferrero**	**6**	**6**

Third round
(United States) T Martin	4	2
9	(Australia) **P Rafter**	**6**	**6**
16	(United States) J-M Gambill	**6**	6^{6}	3
4	(Spain) **J C Ferrero**	2	**7^{8}**	**6**

Quarterfinals
9	(Australia) **P Rafter**	**7**	4	**6**
4	(Spain) J C Ferrero	5	**6**	2

==== Section 4 ====
First round
7	(United Kingdom) **T Henman**	**6**	**6**
LL	(Thailand) P Srichaphan	3	3
Q	(France) M Llodra	**6**	5	5
(Spain) **A Costa**	3	**7**	**7**
(France) **F Santoro**	**6**	**7^{7}**
(Spain) A Portas	4	6^{3}
(Germany) **N Kiefer**	**6**	**7**
12	(Sweden) T Enqvist	2	5
15	(South Africa) W Ferreira	6^{1}	2
(Sweden) **A Vinciguerra**	**7^{7}**	**6**
(Czech Republic) **B Ulihrach**	3	**6**	**6**
Q	(United Kingdom) M Lee	**6**	4	1
WC	(Canada) S Lareau	1	2
LL	(Zimbabwe) **W Black**	**6**	**6**
(France) **N Escudé**	**6**	5
2	(Russia) M Safin	4	2^{r}

Second round
7	(United Kingdom) T Henman	6^{3}	**6**	1
(Spain) **A Costa**	**7^{7}**	4	**6**
(France) **F Santoro**	4	**6**	**6**
(Germany) N Kiefer	**6**	4	3
(Sweden) A Vinciguerra	6^{3}	3
(Czech Republic) **B Ulihrach**	**7^{7}**	**6**
LL	(Zimbabwe) W Black	4	**7^{8}**	3
(France) **N Escudé**	**6**	6^{6}	**6**

Third round
(Spain) A Costa	5	**6**	3
(France) **F Santoro**	**7**	2	**6**
(Czech Republic) **B Ulihrach**	**6**	1	**6**
(France) N Escudé	3	**6**	2

Quarterfinals
(France) **F Santoro**	**6**	4	**6**
(Czech Republic) B Ulihrach	3	**6**	1
