= 1998 Heineken Trophy =

- Date: 15–21 June
- Edition: 9th (men) / 3rd (women)
- Surface: Grass / outdoor
- Location: Rosmalen, 's-Hertogenbosch, Netherlands

Champions

Men's singles
- (Australia) Patrick Rafter

Women's singles
- (France) Julie Halard-Decugis

Men's doubles
- (France) Guillaume Raoux / (Netherlands) Jan Siemerink

Women's doubles
- (Belgium) Sabine Appelmans / (Netherlands) Miriam Oremans
- Heineken Trophy

The 1998 Heineken Trophy was a tennis tournament played on grass courts in Rosmalen, 's-Hertogenbosch in the Netherlands that was part of the International Series of the 1998 ATP Tour and of Tier III of the 1998 WTA Tour. The tournament was held from 15 June through 21 June 1998. Patrick Rafter and Julie Halard-Decugis won the singles titles.

== Finals ==
=== Men's singles ===
(Australia) Patrick Rafter defeated (Czech Republic) Martin Damm 7–6^{(7–2)}, 6–2

- It was Rafter's 3rd title of the year and the 10th of his career.

=== Women's singles ===
(France) Julie Halard-Decugis defeated (Netherlands) Miriam Oremans 6–3, 6–4

- It was Halard-Decugis' 2nd title of the year and the 11th of her career.

=== Men's doubles ===
(France) Guillaume Raoux / (Netherlands) Jan Siemerink defeated (Australia) Joshua Eagle / (Australia) Andrew Florent 7–6^{(7–5)}, 6–2

- It was Raoux's only title of the year and the 5th of his career. It was Siemerink's 2nd title of the year and the 12th of his career.

=== Women's doubles ===
(Belgium) Sabine Appelmans / (Netherlands) Miriam Oremans defeated (Romania) Cătălina Cristea / (Czech Republic) Eva Melicharová 6–7^{(4–7)}, 7–6^{(8–6)}, 7–6^{(7–5)}

- It was Appelmans' 2nd title of the year and the 10th of her career. It was Oremans' 2nd title of the year and the 3rd of her career.
