= 2000 Heineken Trophy – Men's singles =

Men's singles
- 2000 Heineken Trophy

Final
- Champion: (Australia) Patrick Rafter
- Runner-up: (France) Nicolas Escudé
- Score: 6–1, 6–3

Details
- Draw: 32 (4 Q / 2 WC )
- Seeds: 8

Events
Singles	men	women
Doubles	men	women
- Heineken Trophy

Patrick Rafter was the defending champion and won the title defeating Nicolas Escudé 6–1, 6–3 in the final to win his third consecutive Heineken Trophy.

== Seeds ==
1. (Australia) Lleyton Hewitt (withdrew due to an ankle injury)
2. (France) Nicolas Escudé (final)
3. (Australia) Patrick Rafter (champion)
4. (Romania) Andrei Pavel (second round)
5. (United States) Michael Chang (semifinals)
6. (Morocco) Karim Alami (quarterfinals)
7. (Netherlands) Richard Krajicek (second round)
8. (Spain) Francisco Clavet (quarterfinals)

== Draw ==
Key

- Q = Qualifier
- WC = Wild card
- LL = Lucky loser
- Alt = Alternate
- ITF = ITF entry
- PR = Protected ranking
- SR = Special ranking
- SE = Special exempt
- JE = Junior exempt
- JR = Junior Accelerator Programme entrant
- CO = College Accelerator Programme entrant
- NG = Next Gen Accelerator Program entrant
- w/o = Walkover
- r = Retired
- d = Defaulted

=== Finals ===
Semifinals
(Czech Republic) Martin Damm	2	1
3	(Australia) Patrick Rafter	6	6
5	(United States) Michael Chang	6^{4}	2
2	(France) Nicolas Escudé	7^{7}	6

Final
3	(Australia) Patrick Rafter	6	6
2	(France) Nicolas Escudé	1	3

=== Top half ===
First round
LL	(Germany) J Boruszewski	2	6	6^{5}
(Sweden) M Gustafsson	6	1	7^{7}
(Netherlands) J Siemerink	2	6	6
(Sweden) T Johansson	6	3	4
(Czech Republic) M Damm	6	6
(Bulgaria) O Stanoytchev	4	2
(Netherlands) R Sluiter	7^{8}	3	2
7	(Netherlands) R Krajicek	6^{6}	6	6
3	(Australia) P Rafter	6	6
Q	(Netherlands) D van Scheppingen	3	4
Q	(Germany) M-K Goellner	2	4
(Netherlands) S Schalken	6	6
(Belgium) C Rochus	6	1	4
(Germany) M Hantschk	3	6	6
(Russia) A Stoliarov	1	6^{5}
6	(Morocco) K Alami	6	7^{7}

Second round
(Sweden) M Gustafsson	1	7	7
(Netherlands) J Siemerink	6	5	5
(Czech Republic) M Damm	3	7^{7}	6
7	(Netherlands) R Krajicek	6	6^{2}	4
3	(Australia) P Rafter	6	6
(Netherlands) S Schalken	3	2
(Germany) M Hantschk	6^{2}	3
6	(Morocco) K Alami	7^{7}	6

Quarterfinals
(Sweden) M Gustafsson	3	6	5
(Czech Republic) M Damm	6	3	7
3	(Australia) P Rafter	6	3	6
6	(Morocco) K Alami	3	6	3

Semifinals
(Czech Republic) M Damm	2	1
3	(Australia) P Rafter	6	6

=== Bottom half ===
First round
5	(United States) M Chang	6	6
(Thailand) P Srichaphan	3	2
(Switzerland) L Manta	2	6	4
(France) J Golmard	6	4	6
Q	(Germany) K Braasch	6	6
(France) J Boutter	3	0
Q	(Netherlands) R Wassen	2	5
4	(Romania) A Pavel	6	7
8	(Spain) F Clavet	6	6
(Croatia) I Ljubičić	2	2
(Italy) L Tieleman	5	4
WC	(Netherlands) P Wessels	7	6
(Canada) D Nestor	5	7^{7}	3
WC	(Russia) M Youzhny	7	6^{5}	6
(Netherlands) J van Lottum	1	2
2	(France) N Escudé	6	6

Second round
5	(United States) M Chang	1	6	6
(France) J Golmard	6	4	3
Q	(Germany) K Braasch	7	4	7^{8}
4	(Romania) A Pavel	5	6	6^{6}
8	(Spain) F Clavet	6	6
WC	(Netherlands) P Wessels	4	4
WC	(Russia) M Youzhny	5	2
2	(France) N Escudé	7	6

Quarterfinals
5	(United States) M Chang	7^{7}	7^{7}
Q	(Germany) K Braasch	6^{3}	6^{2}
8	(Spain) F Clavet	5	4
2	(France) N Escudé	7	6

Semifinals
5	(United States) M Chang	6^{4}	2
2	(France) N Escudé	7^{7}	6
