= 1999 Heineken Trophy =

- Date: 14–19 June
- Edition: 10th
- Surface: Grass / outdoor
- Location: Rosmalen, 's-Hertogenbosch, Netherlands

Champions

Men's singles
- (Australia) Patrick Rafter

Women's singles
- (Puerto Rico) Kristina Brandi

Men's doubles
- final cancelled due to rain

Women's doubles
- (Italy) Silvia Farina / (Italy) Rita Grande
- Heineken Trophy

The 1999 Heineken Trophy was a tennis tournament played on outdoor grass courts at Autotron park in Rosmalen, 's-Hertogenbosch, Netherlands that was part of the International Series of the 1999 ATP Tour and Tier III of the 1999 WTA Tour. The tournament was held from 14 June through 19 June 1999. Patrick Rafter and Kristina Brandi won the singles titles.

== Finals ==
=== Men's singles ===
(Australia) Patrick Rafter defeated (Romania) Andrei Pavel, 3–6, 7–6^{(9–7)}, 6–4

=== Women's singles ===
(Puerto Rico) Kristina Brandi defeated (Croatia) Silvija Talaja, 6–0, 3–6, 6–1

- It was Brandi's only singles title.

=== Men's doubles ===
(India) Leander Paes / (Netherlands) Jan Siemerink vs. (South Africa) Ellis Ferreira / (Czech Republic) David Rikl, final cancelled due to rain

=== Women's doubles ===
(Italy) Silvia Farina / (Italy) Rita Grande defeated (Zimbabwe) Cara Black / (Netherlands) Kristie Boogert, 7–5, 7–6^{(7–2)}

== WTA entrants ==
=== Seeds ===
Country	Player	Rank	Seed
FRA	Sandrine Testud	13	1
BEL	Dominique Van Roost	16	2
ITA	Silvia Farina	24	4
SVK	Henrieta Nagyová	25	5
ROU	Ruxandra Dragomir	26	6
GER	Anke Huber	30	7
ZIM	Cara Black	34	8
GER	Barbara Rittner	46	9

=== Other entrants ===
The following players received wildcards into the singles main draw:

- (Czech Republic) Sandra Kleinová
- (Slovakia) Karina Habšudová
