= 2001 Heineken Trophy =

- Date: 18–24 June
- Edition: 12th (men) / 6th (women)
- Surface: Grass / outdoor
- Location: Rosmalen, 's-Hertogenbosch, Netherlands

Champions

Men's singles
- (Australia) Lleyton Hewitt

Women's singles
- (Belgium) Justine Henin

Men's doubles
- (Netherlands) Paul Haarhuis / (Netherlands) Sjeng Schalken

Women's doubles
- (Romania) Ruxandra Dragomir Ilie / (Russia) Nadia Petrova
- Heineken Trophy

The 2001 Heineken Trophy was a tennis tournament played on grass courts in Rosmalen, 's-Hertogenbosch in the Netherlands that was part of the International Series of the 2001 ATP Tour and of Tier III of the 2001 WTA Tour. The tournament was held from June 18 through June 24, 2001.

== Finals ==
=== Men's singles ===
(Australia) Lleyton Hewitt defeated (Argentina) Guillermo Cañas 6–3, 6–4

- It was Hewitt's 3rd title of the year and the 11th of his career.

=== Women's singles ===
(Belgium) Justine Henin defeated (Belgium) Kim Clijsters 6–4, 3–6, 6–3

- It was Henin's 3rd title of the year and the 4th of her career.

=== Men's doubles ===
(Netherlands) Paul Haarhuis / (Netherlands) Sjeng Schalken defeated (Czech Republic) Martin Damm / (Czech Republic) Cyril Suk 6–4, 6–4

- It was Haarhuis' 2nd title of the year and the 53rd of his career. It was Schalken's 2nd title of the year and the 10th of his career.

=== Women's doubles ===
(Romania) Ruxandra Dragomir Ilie / (Russia) Nadia Petrova defeated (Belgium) Kim Clijsters / (Netherlands) Miriam Oremans 7–6^{(7–5)}, 6–7^{(5–7)}, 6–4

- It was Dragomir Ilie's only title of the year and the 9th of her career. It was Petrova's 1st title of the year and the 1st of her career.
