= 1999 Heineken Trophy – Men's doubles =

Tennis tournament

Men's doubles
- 1999 Heineken Trophy

Final
- Champions: (India) Leander Paes (Netherlands) Jan Siemerink and (South Africa) Ellis Ferreira (Czech Republic) David Rikl
- Score: Cancelled due to rain

Details
- Draw: 16 (1 Q / 3 WC )
- Seeds: 4

Events
Singles	men	women
Doubles	men	women
- Heineken Trophy

Guillaume Raoux and Jan Siemerink were the defending champions, but Raoux did not compete this year. Siemerink teamed up with Leander Paes and reached the final before the tournament cancellation.

The final match between Leander Paes and Jan Siemerink versus Ellis Ferreira and David Rikl was cancelled due to rain. Both teams shared the prize money (USD54,000 per team) and only won the corresponding points for reaching the final. The outcome allowed Leander Paes to take the World No. 1 in the Doubles ranking.

== Seeds ==
1. (Netherlands) Paul Haarhuis / (Canada) Daniel Nestor (semifinals)
2. (South Africa) Ellis Ferreira / (Czech Republic) David Rikl (final, title shared)
3. (Sweden) Jonas Björkman / (Sweden) Nicklas Kulti (semifinals)
4. (Czech Republic) Martin Damm / (Czech Republic) Cyril Suk (quarterfinals)

== Draw ==
Key

- Q = Qualifier
- WC = Wild card
- LL = Lucky loser
- Alt = Alternate
- ITF = ITF entry
- PR = Protected ranking
- SR = Special ranking
- SE = Special exempt
- JE = Junior exempt
- JR = Junior Accelerator Programme entrant
- CO = College Accelerator Programme entrant
- NG = Next Gen Accelerator Program entrant
- w/o = Walkover
- r = Retired
- d = Defaulted

=== Draw ===
First round
1	(Netherlands) P Haarhuis (Canada) D Nestor	6	6
WC	(Netherlands) S Noteboom (Netherlands) R Wassen	4	2
(South Africa) B Talbot (United States) J Tarango	6	6
WC	(Netherlands) S Schalken (Netherlands) J van Lottum	3	4
4	(Czech Republic) M Damm (Czech Republic) C Suk	7	6
(United States) B Coupe (Mexico) D Roditi	5	3
(Australia) A Florent (Australia) D Macpherson	6	4
(India) L Paes (Netherlands) J Siemerink	7	6
Q	(Romania) A Pavel (Italy) D Sanguinetti	3	3
(United States) D Bowen (Italy) V Santopadre	6	6
WC	(Netherlands) T Kempers (Netherlands) P Wessels	7	5	5
3	(Sweden) J Björkman (Sweden) N Kulti	5	7	7
(South Africa) C Haggard (South Africa) R Koenig	4	4
(North Macedonia) A Kitinov (United States) F Montana	6	6
(Sweden) P Nyborg (Czech Republic) P Vízner	6	2
2	(South Africa) E Ferreira (Czech Republic) D Rikl	7	6

Quarterfinals
1	(Netherlands) P Haarhuis (Canada) D Nestor	3	7	6
(South Africa) B Talbot (United States) J Tarango	6	6	0
4	(Czech Republic) M Damm (Czech Republic) C Suk	4	5
(India) L Paes (Netherlands) J Siemerink	6	7
(United States) D Bowen (Italy) V Santopadre	5	2
3	(Sweden) J Björkman (Sweden) N Kulti	7	6
(North Macedonia) A Kitinov (United States) F Montana	1	4
2	(South Africa) E Ferreira (Czech Republic) D Rikl	6	6

Semifinals
1	(Netherlands) P Haarhuis (Canada) D Nestor	4	6
(India) L Paes (Netherlands) J Siemerink	6	7
3	(Sweden) J Björkman (Sweden) N Kulti	3	6
2	(South Africa) E Ferreira (Czech Republic) D Rikl	6	7

Final
(India) L Paes (Netherlands) J Siemerink
2	(South Africa) E Ferreira (Czech Republic) D Rikl	s
