= 1997 Heineken Trophy =

- Date: 16–22- June
- Edition: 8th (men) / 2nd (women)
- Surface: Grass / outdoor
- Location: Rosmalen, 's-Hertogenbosch, Netherlands

Champions

Men's singles
- (Netherlands) Richard Krajicek

Women's singles
- (Romania) Ruxandra Dragomir

Men's doubles
- (Netherlands) Jacco Eltingh / (Netherlands) Paul Haarhuis

Women's doubles
- (Czech Republic) Eva Melicharová / (Czech Republic) Helena Vildová
- Heineken Trophy

The 1997 Heineken Trophy was a tennis tournament played on grass courts in Rosmalen, 's-Hertogenbosch in the Netherlands that was part of the World Series of the 1996 ATP Tour and of Tier III of the 1997 WTA Tour. The tournament was held from 16 June 16 until 22 June 1997. Richard Krajicek and Ruxandra Dragomir won the singles titles.

== Finals ==
=== Men's singles ===
(Netherlands) Richard Krajicek defeated (France) Guillaume Raoux 6–4, 7–6^{(9–7)}

- It was Krajicek's 3rd title of the year and the 16th of his career.

=== Women's singles ===
(Romania) Ruxandra Dragomir defeated (Netherlands) Miriam Oremans 5–7, 6–2, 6–4

- It was Dragomir's 1st title of the year and the 6th of her career.

=== Men's doubles ===
(Netherlands) Jacco Eltingh / (Netherlands) Paul Haarhuis defeated (United States) Trevor Kronemann / (Australia) David Macpherson 6–4, 7–5

- It was Eltingh's 3rd title of the year and the 35th of his career. It was Haarhuis' 3rd title of the year and the 34th of his career.

=== Women's doubles ===
(Czech Republic) Eva Melicharová / (Czech Republic) Helena Vildová defeated (Slovakia) Karina Habšudová / (Argentina) Florencia Labat 6–3, 7–6^{(8–6)}

- It was Melicharova's 1st title of the year and the 1st of her career. It was Vildova's 1st title of the year and the 1st of her career.
