= 1996 Continental Championships and the Wilkinson Lady Championships =

1996 Continental Championships and Wilkinson Lady Championships
- Date: 10–16 June (men); 17–22 June (women)
- Edition: 7th (men) / 1st (women)
- Surface: Grass / outdoor
- Location: Rosmalen, 's-Hertogenbosch, Netherlands

Champions

Men's singles
- (United States) Richey Reneberg

Women's singles
- (Germany) Anke Huber

Men's doubles
- (Australia) Paul Kilderry / (Czech Republic) Pavel Vízner

Women's doubles
- (Latvia) Larisa Neiland / (Netherlands) Brenda Schultz-McCarthy
- Continental Championships Wilkinson Lady Championships

The 1996 Continental Championships and Wilkinson Lady Championships were tennis tournaments played on grass courts in Rosmalen, 's-Hertogenbosch in the Netherlands and were part of the World Series of the 1996 ATP Tour and of Tier III of the 1996 WTA Tour. The men's tournament ran from 10 to16 June 1996, while the women's tournament ran from 17 to 22 June 1996. Richey Reneberg and Anke Huber won the singles titles, respectively.

== Finals ==
=== Men's singles ===
(United States) Richey Reneberg defeated (France) Stéphane Simian 6–4, 6–0

- It was Reneberg's 1st title of the year and the 17th of his career.

=== Women's singles ===
(Germany) Anke Huber defeated (Czech Republic) Helena Suková 6–4, 7–6^{(7–2)}

- It was Huber's 1st title of the year and the 8th of her career.

=== Men's doubles ===
(Australia) Paul Kilderry / (Czech Republic) Pavel Vízner defeated (Sweden) Anders Järryd / (Canada) Daniel Nestor 7–5, 6–3

- It was Kilderry's only title of the year and the 1st of his career. It was Vízner's 2nd title of the year and the 2nd of his career.

=== Women's doubles ===
(Latvia) Larisa Neiland / (Netherlands) Brenda Schultz-McCarthy defeated (Netherlands) Kristie Boogert / (Czech Republic) Helena Suková 6–4, 7–6^{(9–7)}

- It was Neiland's 3rd title of the year and the 59th of her career. It was Schultz-McCarthy's 5th title of the year and the 14th of her career.
