= 2016 Ricoh Open – Women's singles =

Women's singles
- 2016 Ricoh Open

Final
- Champion: (United States) Coco Vandeweghe
- Runner-up: (France) Kristina Mladenovic
- Score: 7–5, 7–5

Details
- Draw: 32 (6 Q / 3 WC )
- Seeds: 8

Events
Singles	men	women
Doubles	men	women
← 2015 ·	Ricoh Open	· 2017 →

Camila Giorgi was the defending champion, but withdrew before the tournament began.

Sixth-seeded Coco Vandeweghe won the title, defeating Kristina Mladenovic in the final, 7–5, 7–5.

== Seeds ==
1. (Switzerland) Belinda Bencic (semifinals)
2. (Serbia) Jelena Janković (second round)
3. (France) Kristina Mladenovic (final)
4. (Latvia) Jeļena Ostapenko (second round)
5. (Germany) Laura Siegemund (first round)
6. (United States) Coco Vandeweghe (champion)
7. (Canada) Eugenie Bouchard (first round)
8. (Germany) Anna-Lena Friedsam (first round)

== Draw ==
=== Key ===
- Q = Qualifier
- WC = Wild card
- LL = Lucky loser
- Alt = Alternate
- ITF = ITF entry
- PR = Protected ranking
- SR = Special ranking
- SE = Special exempt
- JE = Junior exempt
- JR = Junior Accelerator Programme entrant
- CO = College Accelerator Programme entrant
- NG = Next Gen Accelerator Program entrant
- w/o = Walkover
- r = Retired
- d = Defaulted

=== Finals ===
Semifinals
1	(Switzerland) Belinda Bencic	6	3	4
3	(France) Kristina Mladenovic	2	6	6
(United States) Madison Brengle	4	2
6	(United States) Coco Vandeweghe	6	6

Final
3	(France) Kristina Mladenovic	5	5
6	(United States) Coco Vandeweghe	7	7

=== Top half ===
First round
1	(Switzerland) B Bencic	6	4	7^{7}
(Belgium) A Van Uytvanck	2	6	6^{3}
(Slovenia) P Hercog	4	0^{r}
(United States) V Lepchenko	6	4
Q	(Japan) R Ozaki	6	6
(Belgium) K Flipkens	4	2
Q	(Switzerland) V Golubic	6	7
8	(Germany) A-L Friedsam	3	5
3	(France) K Mladenovic	6	6
(Kazakhstan) Y Shvedova	4	3
Q	(Russia) N Vikhlyantseva	6	6
(Czech Republic) D Allertová	2	1
LL	(Serbia) A Krunić	7^{7}	6
(Croatia) M Lučić-Baroni	6^{0}	1
Q	(Belgium) E Mertens	6	6
7	(Canada) E Bouchard	2	0

Second round
1	(Switzerland) B Bencic	3	6	6
(United States) V Lepchenko	6	3	2
Q	(Japan) R Ozaki	4	2
Q	(Switzerland) V Golubic	6	6
3	(France) K Mladenovic	5	6	6
Q	(Russia) N Vikhlyantseva	7	3	4
LL	(Serbia) A Krunić	4	6^{3}
Q	(Belgium) E Mertens	6	7^{7}

Quarterfinals
1	(Switzerland) B Bencic	7^{8}	7^{7}
Q	(Switzerland) V Golubic	6^{6}	6^{2}
3	(France) K Mladenovic	7	6
Q	(Belgium) E Mertens	5	3

Semifinals
1	(Switzerland) B Bencic	6	3	4
3	(France) K Mladenovic	2	6	6

=== Bottom half ===
First round
5	(Germany) L Siegemund	3	6	2
(United States) M Brengle	6	3	6
Q	(Japan) E Hozumi	2	2
WC	(Netherlands) R Hogenkamp	6	6
(Sweden) J Larsson	6^{3}	2^{r}
(Ukraine) K Kozlova	7^{7}	3
Q	(Serbia) J Jakšić	1	0
4	(Latvia) J Ostapenko	6	6
6	(United States) C Vandeweghe	6	6
WC	(Netherlands) I de Vroome	2	4
(Japan) N Hibino	7^{7}	6
(Switzerland) S Vögele	6^{3}	2
(Russia) E Rodina	6	6
WC	(Hungary) D Gálfi	4	4
(Czech Republic) K Siniaková	4	2
2	(Serbia) J Janković	6	6

Second round
(United States) M Brengle	7	5	7
WC	(Netherlands) R Hogenkamp	5	7	5
(Ukraine) K Kozlova	7	6
4	(Latvia) J Ostapenko	5	2
6	(United States) C Vandeweghe	6	6
(Japan) N Hibino	2	3
(Russia) E Rodina	6^{2}	6	6
2	(Serbia) J Janković	7^{7}	1	4

Quarterfinals
(United States) M Brengle	7	6
(Ukraine) K Kozlova	5	4
6	(United States) C Vandeweghe	6	6
(Russia) E Rodina	2	2

Semifinals
(United States) M Brengle	4	2
6	(United States) C Vandeweghe	6	6

== Qualifying ==
=== Seeds ===
1. (Serbia) Aleksandra Krunić (qualifying competition, lucky loser)
2. (Japan) Risa Ozaki (qualified)
3. (Switzerland) Viktorija Golubic (qualified)
4. (Russia) Irina Khromacheva (qualifying competition)
5. (Russia) Alexandra Panova (first round)
6. (Poland) Urszula Radwańska (first round)
7. (United States) Jennifer Brady (first round)
8. (Switzerland) Amra Sadiković (qualifying competition)
9. (Japan) Miyu Kato (first round)
10. (Romania) Ana Bogdan (qualifying competition)
11. (Belgium) Elise Mertens (qualified)
12. (Czech Republic) Barbora Krejčíková (first round)

=== Qualifiers ===
1. (Japan) Eri Hozumi
2. (Japan) Risa Ozaki
3. (Switzerland) Viktorija Golubic
4. (Russia) Natalia Vikhlyantseva
5. (Serbia) Jovana Jakšić
6. (Belgium) Elise Mertens

=== Lucky losers ===
1. (Serbia) Aleksandra Krunić

=== Draw ===
==== First qualifier ====
First round
1	(Serbia) Aleksandra Krunić	6	2	6
(Bulgaria) Isabella Shinikova	1	6	3
(Japan) Eri Hozumi	6	7^{7}
12	(Czech Republic) Barbora Krejčíková	3	6^{2}

Qualifying competition
1	(Serbia) Aleksandra Krunić	6^{7}	6^{4}
(Japan) Eri Hozumi	7^{9}	7^{7}

==== Second qualifier ====
First round
2	(Japan) Risa Ozaki	7^{8}	6
(Bulgaria) Aleksandrina Naydenova	6^{6}	3
WC	(Netherlands) Erika Vogelsang	3	6	6
9	(Japan) Miyu Kato	6	4	3

Qualifying competition
2	(Japan) Risa Ozaki	6	6
WC	(Netherlands) Erika Vogelsang	3	0

==== Third qualifier ====
First round
3	(Switzerland) Viktorija Golubic	6	7^{7}
(Thailand) Varatchaya Wongteanchai	3	6^{1}
(Australia) Jessica Moore	3	6	3
10	(Romania) Ana Bogdan	6	4	6

Qualifying competition
3	(Switzerland) Viktorija Golubic	6^{5}	6	6
10	(Romania) Ana Bogdan	7^{7}	2	2

==== Fourth qualifier ====
First round
4	(Russia) Irina Khromacheva	1	7	7^{7}
WC	(Poland) Sandra Zaniewska	6	5	6^{4}
(Russia) Natalia Vikhlyantseva	6	6
7	(United States) Jennifer Brady	2	4

Qualifying competition
4	(Russia) Irina Khromacheva	5	1
(Russia) Natalia Vikhlyantseva	7	6

==== Fifth qualifier ====
First round
5	(Russia) Alexandra Panova	4	4
(Serbia) Jovana Jakšić	6	6
WC	(Netherlands) Mandy Wagemaker	4	3
8	(Switzerland) Amra Sadiković	6	6

Qualifying competition
(Serbia) Jovana Jakšić	6	7^{10}
8	(Switzerland) Amra Sadiković	3	6^{8}

==== Sixth qualifier ====
First round
6	(Poland) Urszula Radwańska	1	2
(Czech Republic) Tereza Martincová	6	6
(United States) Asia Muhammad	0	3
11	(Belgium) Elise Mertens	6	6

Qualifying competition
(Czech Republic) Tereza Martincová	2	6	0^{r}
11	(Belgium) Elise Mertens	6	1	2
