= 2010 Internazionali di Tennis di Bergamo Trofeo Trismoka – Doubles =

Doubles
- 2010 Internazionali di Tennis di Bergamo Trofeo Trismoka

Final
- Champions: (United Kingdom) Jonathan Marray (United Kingdom) Jamie Murray
- Runners-up: (Slovakia) Karol Beck (Czech Republic) Jiří Krkoška
- Score: 1–6, 7–6(2), [10–8]

Events
| Singles | Doubles |
| ← 2009 · | Internazionali di Tennis di Bergamo Trofeo Trismoka | · 2011 → |

Karol Beck and Jaroslav Levinský were the defending champions, but Levinský chose to not participate.
Beck partnered up by Jiří Krkoška. They lost in the final 6–1, 6–7(2), [8–10], against Jonathan Marray and Jamie Murray.

== Seeds ==
1. (Thailand) Sanchai Ratiwatana / (Thailand) Sonchat Ratiwatana (quarterfinals)
2. (United Kingdom) Jonathan Marray / (United Kingdom) Jamie Murray (champions)
3. (Italy) Daniele Bracciali / (Israel) Jonathan Erlich (semifinals)
4. (Poland) Tomasz Bednarek / (Poland) Mateusz Kowalczyk (semifinals)

== Draw ==
=== Key ===
- Q = Qualifier
- WC = Wild card
- LL = Lucky loser
- Alt = Alternate
- SE = Special exempt
- PR = Protected ranking
- ITF = ITF entry
- JE = Junior exempt
- w/o = Walkover
- r = Retired
- d = Defaulted
- SR = Special ranking

=== Draw ===
First round
1 | (Thailand) Sa Ratiwatana (Thailand) So Ratiwatana | 4 | 6 | [10]
(Russia) A Kudryavtsev (Russia) D Sitak | 6 | 4 | [8]
(Switzerland) Y Allegro (Croatia) L Zovko | 3 | 2
ALT | (Slovakia) K Beck (Czech Republic) J Krkoška | 6 | 6
3 | (Italy) D Bracciali (Israel) J Erlich | 7 | 5 | [10]
WC | (Japan) G Soeda (Japan) T Suzuki | 6^{1} | 7 | [5]
(India) P Amritraj (United States) B Evans | 6 | 4 | [10]
(Kazakhstan) M Kukushkin (Italy) A Motti | 4 | 6 | [5]
(Serbia) I Bozoljac (United Kingdom) J Delgado | 6 | 6
WC | (Italy) M Crugnola (Italy) S Galvani | 1 | 4
(Slovakia) D Hrbatý (Czech Republic) L Rosol | 6^{4} | 7 | [8]
4 | (Poland) T Bednarek (Poland) M Kowalczyk | 7 | 6^{5} | [10]
(Croatia) I Dodig (Germany) F Moser | 7 | 3 | [6]
WC | (Lithuania) L Grigelis (Italy) A Stoppini | 5 | 6 | [10]
(Jamaica) D Brown (India) H Mankad | 1 | 7 | [7]
2 | (United Kingdom) J Marray (United Kingdom) J Murray | 6 | 6^{4} | [10]

Quarterfinals
1 | (Thailand) Sa Ratiwatana (Thailand) So Ratiwatana | 3 | 4
ALT | (Slovakia) K Beck (Czech Republic) J Krkoška | 6 | 6
3 | (Italy) D Bracciali (Israel) J Erlich | 6 | 7
(India) P Amritraj (United States) B Evans | 0 | 6^{3}
(Serbia) I Bozoljac (United Kingdom) J Delgado | 3 | 6^{5}
4 | (Poland) T Bednarek (Poland) M Kowalczyk | 6 | 7
WC | (Lithuania) L Grigelis (Italy) A Stoppini | 2 | 5
2 | (United Kingdom) J Marray (United Kingdom) J Murray | 6 | 7

Semifinals
ALT | (Slovakia) K Beck (Czech Republic) J Krkoška | 6 | 3 | [10]
3 | (Italy) D Bracciali (Israel) J Erlich | 2 | 6 | [7]
4 | (Poland) T Bednarek (Poland) M Kowalczyk | 6^{5} | 7 | [7]
2 | (United Kingdom) J Marray (United Kingdom) J Murray | 7 | 6^{5} | [10]

Finals
ALT | (Slovakia) K Beck (Czech Republic) J Krkoška | 1 | 7 | [8]
2 | (United Kingdom) J Marray (United Kingdom) J Murray | 6 | 6^{2} | [10]
