= 2017 Ricoh Open – Women's doubles =

Women's doubles
- 2017 Ricoh Open

Final
- Champions: (Slovakia) Dominika Cibulková (Belgium) Kirsten Flipkens
- Runners-up: (Netherlands) Kiki Bertens (Netherlands) Demi Schuurs
- Score: 4–6, 6–4, [10–6]

Details
- Draw: 16
- Seeds: 4

Events
Singles	men	women
Doubles	men	women
← 2016 ·	Ricoh Open	· 2018 →

Oksana Kalashnikova and Yaroslava Shvedova were the defending champions, but chose not to participate this year.

Dominika Cibulková and Kirsten Flipkens won the title, defeating Kiki Bertens and Demi Schuurs in the final, 4–6, 6–4, [10–6].

== Seeds ==
1. (Hungary) Tímea Babos / (Czech Republic) Andrea Hlaváčková (quarterfinals)
2. (Netherlands) Kiki Bertens / (Netherlands) Demi Schuurs (final)
3. (Switzerland) Xenia Knoll / (United States) Coco Vandeweghe (semifinals)
4. (United States) Nicole Melichar / (United Kingdom) Anna Smith (quarterfinals)

== Draw ==
=== Key ===
- Q = Qualifier
- WC = Wild card
- LL = Lucky loser
- Alt = Alternate
- ITF = ITF entry
- PR = Protected ranking
- SR = Special ranking
- SE = Special exempt
- JE = Junior exempt
- JR = Junior Accelerator Programme entrant
- CO = College Accelerator Programme entrant
- NG = Next Gen Accelerator Program entrant
- w/o = Walkover
- r = Retired
- d = Defaulted

=== Draw ===
First round
1	(Hungary) T Babos (Czech Republic) A Hlaváčková	6	5	[10]
(United States) V Lepchenko (Ukraine) L Tsurenko	2	7	[2]
(Slovakia) D Cibulková (Belgium) K Flipkens	6	6
WC	(Netherlands) K Versteeg (Netherlands) E Vogelsang	3	0
3	(Switzerland) X Knoll (United States) C Vandeweghe	6	7
(Belgium) E Mertens (Netherlands) E Wacanno	3	5
(Japan) M Kato (Japan) R Ozaki	3	6^{4}
(United States) J Cako (Bulgaria) A Naydenova	6	7^{7}
(Ukraine) L Kichenok (Ukraine) N Kichenok	6	6
(Germany) N Geuer (Czech Republic) L Kunčíková	3	4
(Serbia) J Janković (Germany) A Petkovic	6^{5}	6	[4]
4	(United States) N Melichar (United Kingdom) A Smith	7^{7}	4	[10]
(Australia) J Moore (Thailand) V Wongteanchai	3	6	[8]
WC	(Netherlands) R Hogenkamp (Netherlands) A Rus	6	4	[10]
(United States) M Brengle (United States) A Muhammad	4	3
2	(Netherlands) K Bertens (Netherlands) D Schuurs	6	6

Quarterfinals
1	(Hungary) T Babos (Czech Republic) A Hlaváčková	6	5	[12]
(Slovakia) D Cibulková (Belgium) K Flipkens	4	7	[14]
3	(Switzerland) X Knoll (United States) C Vandeweghe	6	6
(United States) J Cako (Bulgaria) A Naydenova	1	4
(Ukraine) L Kichenok (Ukraine) N Kichenok	7^{7}	4	[10]
4	(United States) N Melichar (United Kingdom) A Smith	6^{4}	6	[8]
WC	(Netherlands) R Hogenkamp (Netherlands) A Rus	3	6	[8]
2	(Netherlands) K Bertens (Netherlands) D Schuurs	6	4	[10]

Semifinals
(Slovakia) D Cibulková (Belgium) K Flipkens	7^{7}	6
3	(Switzerland) X Knoll (United States) C Vandeweghe	6^{5}	2
(Ukraine) L Kichenok (Ukraine) N Kichenok	6^{8}	4
2	(Netherlands) K Bertens (Netherlands) D Schuurs	7^{10}	6

Final
(Slovakia) D Cibulková (Belgium) K Flipkens	4	6	[10]
2	(Netherlands) K Bertens (Netherlands) D Schuurs	6	4	[6]
