= 2016 Ricoh Open – Men's doubles =

Men's doubles
- 2016 Ricoh Open

Final
- Champions: (Croatia) Mate Pavić (New Zealand) Michael Venus
- Runners-up: (United Kingdom) Dominic Inglot (South Africa) Raven Klaasen
- Score: 3–6, 6–3, [11–9]

Events
Singles	men	women
Doubles	men	women
← 2015 ·	Ricoh Open	· 2017 →

Ivo Karlović and Łukasz Kubot were the defending champions, but Karlović chose not to participate this year and Kubot chose to compete in Stuttgart instead.
Mate Pavić and Michael Venus won the title, defeating Dominic Inglot and Raven Klaasen in the final, 3–6, 6–3, [11–9].

== Seeds ==
1. (India) Rohan Bopanna / (France) Nicolas Mahut (quarterfinals)
2. (Croatia) Ivan Dodig / (United States) Rajeev Ram (quarterfinals, withdrew)
3. (United Kingdom) Dominic Inglot / (South Africa) Raven Klaasen (final)
4. (Canada) Daniel Nestor / (Pakistan) Aisam-ul-Haq Qureshi (first round)

== Draw ==
=== Key ===
- Q = Qualifier
- WC = Wild card
- LL = Lucky loser
- Alt = Alternate
- SE = Special exempt
- PR = Protected ranking
- ITF = ITF entry
- JE = Junior exempt
- w/o = Walkover
- r = Retired
- d = Defaulted
- SR = Special ranking

=== Draw ===
First round
1	(India) R Bopanna (France) N Mahut	6	6
WC	(Spain) G García-López (Netherlands) R Haase	1	4
(Brazil) M Demoliner (United States) N Monroe	3	3
(Luxembourg) G Müller (Denmark) F Nielsen	6	6
3	(United Kingdom) D Inglot (South Africa) R Klaasen	3	6	[10]
(Netherlands) W Koolhof (Netherlands) M Middelkoop	6	3	[8]
WC	(Australia) M Reid (Australia) B Tomic	6	3	[3]
(Sweden) J Brunström (Sweden) A Siljeström	3	6	[10]
(Australia) C Guccione (Brazil) A Sá	6	3	[10]
(United States) S Johnson (United States) S Querrey	2	6	[6]
(Mexico) S González (United States) S Lipsky	6	6
4	(Canada) D Nestor (Pakistan) A-u-H Qureshi	3	1
(Croatia) M Pavić (New Zealand) M Venus	6^{5}	6	[14]
(Israel) J Erlich (United Kingdom) C Fleming	7^{7}	3	[12]
(Belarus) A Bury (Slovakia) I Zelenay	7^{11}	4	[7]
2	(Croatia) I Dodig (United States) R Ram	6^{9}	6	[10]

Quarterfinals
1	(India) R Bopanna (France) N Mahut	3	5
(Luxembourg) G Müller (Denmark) F Nielsen	6	7
3	(United Kingdom) D Inglot (South Africa) R Klaasen	6	6
(Sweden) J Brunström (Sweden) A Siljeström	4	1
(Australia) C Guccione (Brazil) A Sá	7^{8}	3	[7]
(Mexico) S González (United States) S Lipsky	6^{6}	6	[10]
(Croatia) M Pavić (New Zealand) M Venus	w/o
2	(Croatia) I Dodig (United States) R Ram

Semifinals
(Luxembourg) G Müller (Denmark) F Nielsen	6^{6}	6	[8]
3	(United Kingdom) D Inglot (South Africa) R Klaasen	7^{8}	1	[10]
(Mexico) S González (United States) S Lipsky	4	4
(Croatia) M Pavić (New Zealand) M Venus	6	6

Final
3	(United Kingdom) D Inglot (South Africa) R Klaasen	6	3	[9]
(Croatia) M Pavić (New Zealand) M Venus	3	6	[11]
