= 2017 Ricoh Open – Men's doubles =

Men's doubles
- 2017 Ricoh Open

Final
- Champions: (Poland) Łukasz Kubot (Brazil) Marcelo Melo
- Runners-up: (South Africa) Raven Klaasen (United States) Rajeev Ram
- Score: 6–3, 6–4

Events
Singles	men	women
Doubles	men	women
← 2016 ·	Ricoh Open	· 2018 →

Mate Pavić and Michael Venus were the defending champions, but Pavić chose to compete in Stuttgart instead. Venus played alongside André Sá, but lost to Łukasz Kubot and Marcelo Melo in the semifinals.

Kubot and Melo went on to win the title, defeating Raven Klaasen and Rajeev Ram in the final, 6–3, 6–4.

== Seeds ==
1. (Poland) Łukasz Kubot / (Brazil) Marcelo Melo (champions)
2. (South Africa) Raven Klaasen / (United States) Rajeev Ram (final)
3. (Netherlands) Jean-Julien Rojer / (Romania) Horia Tecău (quarterfinals)
4. (France) Fabrice Martin / (Canada) Daniel Nestor (quarterfinals)

== Draw ==
=== Key ===
- Q = Qualifier
- WC = Wild card
- LL = Lucky loser
- Alt = Alternate
- SE = Special exempt
- PR = Protected ranking
- ITF = ITF entry
- JE = Junior exempt
- w/o = Walkover
- r = Retired
- d = Defaulted
- SR = Special ranking

=== Draw ===
First round
1	(Poland) Ł Kubot (Brazil) M Melo	6	7^{7}
(Germany) P Petzschner (Austria) A Peya	1	6^{4}
(Mexico) S González (Canada) A Shamasdin	6	4	[10]
WC	(Netherlands) T Griekspoor (Netherlands) D Pel	4	6	[7]
3	(Netherlands) J-J Rojer (Romania) H Tecău	6	7^{8}
(France) J Eysseric (France) N Mahut	3	6^{6}
(Brazil) A Sá (New Zealand) M Venus	6	6
(India) P Raja (India) D Sharan	3	4
WC	(Australia) T Kokkinakis (Germany) A Zverev	3	3
(Australia) J Peers (Australia) J Thompson	6	6
(Netherlands) W Koolhof (Netherlands) M Middelkoop	1	7^{12}	[9]
4	(France) F Martin (Canada) D Nestor	6	6^{10}	[11]
(Belgium) S Darcis (Luxembourg) G Müller	5	4
(United States) S Lipsky (India) L Paes	7	6
(Netherlands) R Haase (United Kingdom) D Inglot	3	7^{7}	[3]
2	(South Africa) R Klaasen (United States) R Ram	6	6^{5}	[10]

Quarterfinals
1	(Poland) Ł Kubot (Brazil) M Melo	6	6
(Mexico) S González (Canada) A Shamasdin	2	2
3	(Netherlands) J-J Rojer (Romania) H Tecău	6	3	[8]
(Brazil) A Sá (New Zealand) M Venus	3	6	[10]
(Australia) J Peers (Australia) J Thompson	6^{4}	7^{9}	[13]
4	(France) F Martin (Canada) D Nestor	7^{7}	6^{7}	[11]
(United States) S Lipsky (India) L Paes	4	4
2	(South Africa) R Klaasen (United States) R Ram	6	6

Semifinals
1	(Poland) Ł Kubot (Brazil) M Melo	6^{5}	6	[10]
(Brazil) A Sá (New Zealand) M Venus	7^{7}	4	[5]
(Australia) J Peers (Australia) J Thompson	6^{4}	5
2	(South Africa) R Klaasen (United States) R Ram	7^{7}	7

Final
1	(Poland) Ł Kubot (Brazil) M Melo	6	6
2	(South Africa) R Klaasen (United States) R Ram	3	4
