= 2017 Ricoh Open =

- Date: 12–18 June
- Edition: 28th
- Category: ATP World Tour 250; WTA International
- Draw: 32S / 16D
- Prize money: €566,525 (ATP) $250,000 (WTA)
- Surface: Grass
- Location: Rosmalen, 's-Hertogenbosch, Netherlands

Champions

Men's singles
- (Luxembourg) Gilles Müller

Women's singles
- (Estonia) Anett Kontaveit

Men's doubles
- (Poland) Łukasz Kubot / (Brazil) Marcelo Melo

Women's doubles
- (Slovakia) Dominika Cibulková / (Belgium) Kirsten Flipkens
← 2016 ·	Rosmalen Grass Court Championships	· 2018 →

The 2017 Ricoh Open was a tennis tournament played on outdoor grass courts. It was the 28th edition of the Rosmalen Grass Court Championships, and part of the 250 Series of the 2017 ATP World Tour, and of the WTA International tournaments of the 2017 WTA Tour. Both the men's and the women's events took place at the Autotron park in Rosmalen, 's-Hertogenbosch in the Netherlands, from June 12 through June 18, 2017.

== ATP singles main-draw entrants ==
=== Seeds ===
Country	Player	Rank^{1}	Seed
CRO	Marin Čilić	8	1
GER	Alexander Zverev	10	2
CRO	Ivo Karlović	24	3
LUX	Gilles Müller	27	4
BEL	Steve Darcis	38	5
NED	Robin Haase	46	6
FRA	Nicolas Mahut	48	7
GBR	Aljaž Bedene	52	8

- ^{1} Rankings are as of May 29, 2017.

=== Other entrants ===
The following players received wildcards into the main draw:

- (Netherlands) Tallon Griekspoor
- (United States) Stefan Kozlov
- (Germany) Alexander Zverev

The following player received entry using a protected ranking:

- (Australia) Thanasi Kokkinakis

The following players received entry from the qualifying draw:

- (Japan) Tatsuma Ito
- (Russia) Daniil Medvedev
- (United States) Dennis Novikov
- (Canada) Vasek Pospisil

The following players received entry as a lucky losers:

- (France) Julien Benneteau
- (Chinese Taipei) Jason Jung

=== Withdrawals ===
Before the tournament

- (South Korea) Chung Hyeon →replaced by (Chinese Taipei) Jason Jung
- (Argentina) Juan Martín del Potro →replaced by (Russia) Evgeny Donskoy
- (France) Richard Gasquet →replaced by (Australia) Jordan Thompson
- (Belgium) David Goffin →replaced by (Russia) Mikhail Youzhny
- (Chinese Taipei) Lu Yen-hsun →replaced by (France) Julien Benneteau

== ATP doubles main-draw entrants ==
=== Seeds ===
Country	Player	Country	Player	Rank^{1}	Seed
POL	Łukasz Kubot	BRA	Marcelo Melo	14	1
RSA	Raven Klaasen	USA	Rajeev Ram	28	2
NED	Jean-Julien Rojer	ROU	Horia Tecău	46	3
FRA	Fabrice Martin	CAN	Daniel Nestor	55	4

- ^{1} Rankings are as of May 29, 2017.

=== Other entrants ===
The following pairs received wildcards into the doubles main draw:

- (Netherlands) Tallon Griekspoor / (Netherlands) David Pel
- (Australia) Thanasi Kokkinakis / (Germany) Alexander Zverev

== WTA singles main-draw entrants ==
=== Seeds ===
Country	Player	Rank^{1}	Seed
SVK	Dominika Cibulková	7	1
FRA	Kristina Mladenovic	14	2
NED	Kiki Bertens	18	3
USA	CoCo Vandeweghe	20	4
CRO	Ana Konjuh	30	5
HUN	Tímea Babos	35	6
UKR	Lesia Tsurenko	42	7
CZE	Kristýna Plíšková	44	8

- ^{1} Rankings are as of May 29, 2017.

=== Other entrants ===
The following players received wildcards into the main draw:

- (Slovakia) Dominika Cibulková
- (Russia) Anna Kalinskaya
- (Netherlands) Arantxa Rus

The following players received entry from the qualifying draw:

- (Czech Republic) Andrea Hlaváčková
- (Japan) Miyu Kato
- (Germany) Tamara Korpatsch
- (Czech Republic) Petra Krejsová
- (Sweden) Cornelia Lister
- (Germany) Antonia Lottner

The following player received entry as a lucky loser:

- (United States) Asia Muhammad

=== Withdrawals ===
Before the tournament

- (Germany) Annika Beck →replaced by (Belgium) Kirsten Flipkens
- (France) Alizé Cornet →replaced by (United States) Madison Brengle
- (Latvia) Jeļena Ostapenko →replaced by (Belarus) Aliaksandra Sasnovich
- (Kazakhstan) Yaroslava Shvedova →replaced by (United States) Asia Muhammad

== WTA doubles main-draw entrants ==
=== Seeds ===
Country	Player	Country	Player	Rank^{1}	Seed
HUN	Tímea Babos	CZE	Andrea Hlaváčková	22	1
NED	Kiki Bertens	NED	Demi Schuurs	93	2
SUI	Xenia Knoll	USA	CoCo Vandeweghe	93	3
USA	Nicole Melichar	GBR	Anna Smith	122	4

- ^{1} Rankings are as of May 29, 2017.

=== Other entrants ===
The following pairs received wildcards into the doubles main draw:

- (Netherlands) Richèl Hogenkamp / (Netherlands) Arantxa Rus
- (Netherlands) Kelly Versteeg / (Netherlands) Erika Vogelsang

== Champions ==
=== Men's singles ===
- (Luxembourg) Gilles Müller def. (Croatia) Ivo Karlović, 7–6^{(7–5)}, 7–6^{(7–4)}

=== Women's singles ===
- (Estonia) Anett Kontaveit def. (Russia) Natalia Vikhlyantseva, 6–2, 6–3

=== Men's doubles ===
- (Poland) Łukasz Kubot / (Brazil) Marcelo Melo def. (South Africa) Raven Klaasen / (United States) Rajeev Ram, 6–3, 6–4

=== Women's doubles ===
- (Slovakia) Dominika Cibulková / (Belgium) Kirsten Flipkens def. (Netherlands) Kiki Bertens / (Netherlands) Demi Schuurs, 4–6, 6–4, [10–6]
