= 2010 Internazionali di Tennis di Bergamo Trofeo Trismoka =

- Date: February 8 – February 14
- Edition: 5th
- Location: Bergamo, Italy

Champions

Singles
- (Slovakia) Karol Beck

Doubles
- (United Kingdom) Jonathan Marray / (United Kingdom) Jamie Murray
← 2009 ·	ATP Challenger Bergamo	· 2011 →

The 2010 Internazionali di Tennis di Bergamo Trofeo Trismoka was a professional tennis tournament played on indoor hard courts. It was part of the 2010 ATP Challenger Tour. It took place in Bergamo, Italy between 8 and 14 February 2010.

== ATP entrants ==
=== Seeds ===
Country	Player	Rank	Seed
KAZ	Mikhail Kukushkin	124	1
SVK	Karol Beck	131	2
JAM	Dustin Brown	141	3
CZE	Lukáš Rosol	145	4
FRA	Thierry Ascione	147	5
CRO	Ivan Dodig	153	6
SVK	Dominik Hrbatý	154	7
USA	Brendan Evans	166	8

- Rankings are as of February 1, 2010.

=== Other entrants ===
The following players received wildcards into the singles main draw:

- (Italy) Marco Crugnola
- (Lithuania) Laurynas Grigelis
- (Luxembourg) Gilles Müller
- (Italy) Andrea Stoppini

The following players received entry from the qualifying draw:

- (Ukraine) Sergei Bubka
- (Sweden) Ervin Eleskovic
- (Russia) Evgeny Kirillov
- (Switzerland) Roman Valent

The following player received special exempt into the main draw:

- (Germany) Tobias Kamke

== Champions ==
=== Singles ===
(Slovakia) Karol Beck def. (Luxembourg) Gilles Müller, 6–4, 6–4

=== Doubles ===
(United Kingdom) Jonathan Marray / (United Kingdom) Jamie Murray def. (Slovakia) Karol Beck / (Czech Republic) Jiří Krkoška, 1–6, 7–6(2), [10–8]
