= 2010 Internazionali di Tennis di Bergamo Trofeo Trismoka – Singles =

Singles
- 2010 Internazionali di Tennis di Bergamo Trofeo Trismoka

Final
- Champion: (Slovakia) Karol Beck
- Runner-up: (Luxembourg) Gilles Müller
- Score: 6–4, 6–4

Events
Singles	Doubles
← 2009 ·	Internazionali di Tennis di Bergamo Trofeo Trismoka	· 2011 →

Lukáš Rosol was the defending champion, but he lost in the second round to Ilija Bozoljac.
Karol Beck won in the final 6–4, 6–4 against Gilles Müller

== Seeds ==
1. (Kazakhstan) Mikhail Kukushkin (second round)
2. (Slovakia) Karol Beck (champion)
3. (Jamaica) Dustin Brown (semifinals)
4. (Czech Republic) Lukáš Rosol (second round)
5. (France) Thierry Ascione (first round)
6. (Croatia) Ivan Dodig (quarterfinals)
7. (Slovakia) Dominik Hrbatý (semifinals)
8. (United States) Brendan Evans (first round)

== Draw ==
=== Key ===
- Q = Qualifier
- WC = Wild card
- LL = Lucky loser
- Alt = Alternate
- SE = Special exempt
- PR = Protected ranking
- ITF = ITF entry
- JE = Junior exempt
- w/o = Walkover
- r = Retired
- d = Defaulted
- SR = Special ranking

=== Finals ===
Semifinals
WC	(Luxembourg) Gilles Müller	2	6	7
7	(Slovakia) Dominik Hrbatý	6	3	6^{1}
3	(Jamaica) Dustin Brown	3	4
2	(Slovakia) Karol Beck	6	6

Final
WC	(Luxembourg) Gilles Müller	4	4
2	(Slovakia) Karol Beck	6	6

=== Top half ===
First round
1	(Kazakhstan) M Kukushkin	6	7
(Austria) M Fischer	4	6^{1}
WC	(Luxembourg) G Müller	6
(Germany) J Reister	3	r
Q	(Ukraine) S Bubka	7	6
Q	(Sweden) E Eleskovic	6^{1}	4
(Poland) M Przysiężny	6	7
5	(France) T Ascione	4	6^{4}
4	(Czech Republic) L Rosol	6	6
Q	(Russia) E Kirillov	2	4
(Serbia) I Bozoljac	7	7
(Austria) A Haider-Maurer	5	6^{7}
(Russia) A Kudryavtsev	6	7
WC	(Italy) A Stoppini	1	6^{11}
(Switzerland) M Lammer	4	4
7	(Slovakia) D Hrbatý	6	6

Second round
1	(Kazakhstan) M Kukushkin	6^{5}	6^{4}
WC	(Luxembourg) G Müller	7	7
Q	(Ukraine) S Bubka	6^{4}	6^{1}
(Poland) M Przysiężny	7	7
4	(Czech Republic) L Rosol	6	3	2
(Serbia) I Bozoljac	4	6	6
(Russia) A Kudryavtsev	2	6^{3}
7	(Slovakia) D Hrbatý	6	7

Quarterfinals
WC	(Luxembourg) G Müller	7	6
(Poland) M Przysiężny	6^{10}	4
(Serbia) I Bozoljac	3	2
7	(Slovakia) D Hrbatý	6	6

Semifinals
WC	(Luxembourg) G Müller	2	6	7
7	(Slovakia) D Hrbatý	6	3	6^{1}

=== Bottom half ===
First round
8	(United States) B Evans	7	6^{6}	4
Q	(Switzerland) R Valent	6^{4}	7	6
(Belarus) U Ignatik	7	3	2
WC	(Lithuania) L Grigelis	6^{3}	6	6
(India) P Amritraj	5	6	5
WC	(Italy) M Crugnola	7	1	7
(Belgium) R Bemelmans	7	3	4
3	(Jamaica) D Brown	6^{4}	6	6
6	(Croatia) I Dodig	7	6
(Kazakhstan) Y Schukin	6^{5}	4
(United States) A Kuznetsov	6	6
SE	(Germany) T Kamke	4	4
(France) A Sidorenko	4	1
(United Kingdom) A Bogdanovic	6	6
(Croatia) R Karanušić	2	1
2	(Slovakia) K Beck	6	6

Second round
Q	(Switzerland) R Valent	7	6
WC	(Lithuania) L Grigelis	5	3
WC	(Italy) M Crugnola	6^{4}	6^{5}
3	(Jamaica) D Brown	7	7
6	(Croatia) I Dodig	6	7
(United States) A Kuznetsov	4	5
(United Kingdom) A Bogdanovic	6	1	3
2	(Slovakia) K Beck	4	6	6

Quarterfinals
Q	(Switzerland) R Valent	4	7	4
3	(Jamaica) D Brown	6	5	6
6	(Croatia) I Dodig	4	6	3
2	(Slovakia) K Beck	6	3	6

Semifinals
3	(Jamaica) D Brown	3	4
2	(Slovakia) K Beck	6	6
