= 2017 Ricoh Open – Women's singles =

Women's singles
- 2017 Ricoh Open

Final
- Champion: (Estonia) Anett Kontaveit
- Runner-up: (Russia) Natalia Vikhlyantseva
- Score: 6–2, 6–3

Details
- Draw: 32 (6 Q / 3 WC )
- Seeds: 8

Events
Singles	men	women
Doubles	men	women
- Ricoh Open

CoCo Vandeweghe was the defending champion, but lost in the first round to Carina Witthöft.

Anett Kontaveit won her first WTA title, defeating Natalia Vikhlyantseva in the final, 6–2, 6–3.

== Seeds ==
1. (Slovakia) Dominika Cibulková (first round)
2. (France) Kristina Mladenovic (quarterfinals)
3. (Netherlands) Kiki Bertens (first round)
4. (United States) CoCo Vandeweghe (first round)
5. (Croatia) Ana Konjuh (semifinals)
6. (Hungary) Tímea Babos (first round)
7. (Ukraine) Lesia Tsurenko (semifinals)
8. (Czech Republic) Kristýna Plíšková (first round)

== Draw ==
Key

- Q = Qualifier
- WC = Wild card
- LL = Lucky loser
- Alt = Alternate
- ITF = ITF entry
- PR = Protected ranking
- SR = Special ranking
- SE = Special exempt
- JE = Junior exempt
- JR = Junior Accelerator Programme entrant
- CO = College Accelerator Programme entrant
- NG = Next Gen Accelerator Program entrant
- w/o = Walkover
- r = Retired
- d = Defaulted

=== Finals ===
Semifinals
5	(Croatia) Ana Konjuh	3	5
(Russia) Natalia Vikhlyantseva	6	7
(Estonia) Anett Kontaveit	6	6^{0}	6
7	(Ukraine) Lesia Tsurenko	3	7^{7}	2

Final
(Russia) Natalia Vikhlyantseva	2	3
(Estonia) Anett Kontaveit	6	6

=== Top half ===
First round
1/WC	(Slovakia) D Cibulková	5	6	4
Q	(Germany) A Lottner	7	2	6
Q	(Japan) M Kato	1	1
(Russia) E Rodina	6	6
(Netherlands) R Hogenkamp	6	6
(Luxembourg) M Minella	3	3
Q	(Germany) T Korpatsch	4	4
5	(Croatia) A Konjuh	6	6
3	(Netherlands) K Bertens	6^{6}	6	2
(Germany) A Petkovic	7^{8}	2	6
(Russia) N Vikhlyantseva	6	6
Q	(Sweden) C Lister	1	4
Q	(Czech Republic) A Hlaváčková	6	3	6
LL	(United States) A Muhammad	3	6	4
WC	(Netherlands) A Rus	5	6	6
6	(Hungary) T Babos	7	2	3

Second round
Q	(Germany) A Lottner	5	3
(Russia) E Rodina	7	6
(Netherlands) R Hogenkamp	6	3	4
5	(Croatia) A Konjuh	4	6	6
(Germany) A Petkovic	3	7	2
(Russia) N Vikhlyantseva	6	5	6
Q	(Czech Republic) A Hlaváčková	2	5
WC	(Netherlands) A Rus	6	7

Quarterfinals
(Russia) E Rodina	3	7^{7}	6^{10}
5	(Croatia) A Konjuh	6	6^{4}	7^{12}
(Russia) N Vikhlyantseva	6	6
WC	(Netherlands) A Rus	3	2

Semifinals
5	(Croatia) A Konjuh	3	5
(Russia) N Vikhlyantseva	6	7

=== Bottom half ===
First round
8	(Czech Republic) Kr Plíšková	7^{7}	3	1
(Estonia) A Kontaveit	6^{5}	6	6
(Belgium) K Flipkens	6	6
(United States) M Brengle	1	2
(United States) V Lepchenko	3	7^{8}	2
(Italy) C Giorgi	6	6^{6}	6
(Germany) C Witthöft	6^{3}	6	7
4	(United States) C Vandeweghe	7^{7}	3	5
7	(Ukraine) L Tsurenko	6	6
(Belgium) E Mertens	4	1
(Serbia) J Janković	3	5
Q	(Czech Republic) P Krejsová	6	7
(Belarus) A Sasnovich	6	6
WC	(Russia) A Kalinskaya	3	4
(Japan) R Ozaki	5	1
2	(France) K Mladenovic	7	6

Second round
(Estonia) A Kontaveit	3	6	6
(Belgium) K Flipkens	6	1	2
(Italy) C Giorgi	6^{5}	3
(Germany) C Witthöft	7^{7}	6
7	(Ukraine) L Tsurenko	6	6
Q	(Czech Republic) P Krejsová	2	3
(Belarus) A Sasnovich	6	2	2
2	(France) K Mladenovic	3	6	6

Quarterfinals
(Estonia) A Kontaveit	6	6
(Germany) C Witthöft	3	1
7	(Ukraine) L Tsurenko	6	6
2	(France) K Mladenovic	3	1

Semifinals
(Estonia) A Kontaveit	6	6^{0}	6
7	(Ukraine) L Tsurenko	3	7^{7}	2

== Qualifying ==
=== Seeds ===
1. (Germany) Tamara Korpatsch (qualified)
2. (United States) Asia Muhammad (qualifying competition, lucky loser)
3. (United States) Jamie Loeb (first round)
4. (Czech Republic) Tereza Smitková (first round)
5. (Germany) Antonia Lottner (qualified)
6. (Liechtenstein) Kathinka von Deichmann (first round)
7. (Japan) Miyu Kato (qualified)
8. (Hungary) Fanny Stollár (first round)
9. (Switzerland) Amra Sadiković (qualifying competition)
10. (United States) Jacqueline Cako (qualifying competition)
11. (Germany) Katharina Hobgarski (first round)
12. (Czech Republic) Karolína Muchová (qualifying competition)

=== Qualifiers ===
1. (Germany) Tamara Korpatsch
2. (Czech Republic) Petra Krejsová
3. (Japan) Miyu Kato
4. (Czech Republic) Andrea Hlaváčková
5. (Germany) Antonia Lottner
6. (Sweden) Cornelia Lister

=== Lucky loser ===
1. (United States) Asia Muhammad

=== Draw ===
==== First qualifier ====
First round
1	(Germany) Tamara Korpatsch	7	5	7^{10}
(Belarus) Sviatlana Pirazhenka	5	7	6^{8}
WC	(Belgium) Lara Salden	5	2
10	(United States) Jacqueline Cako	7	6

Qualifying competition
1	(Germany) Tamara Korpatsch	7^{7}	6
10	(United States) Jacqueline Cako	6^{4}	3

==== Second qualifier ====
First round
2	(United States) Asia Muhammad	7	6
(Russia) Marina Melnikova	5	3
(Czech Republic) Petra Krejsová	3	6	6
11	(Germany) Katharina Hobgarski	6	3	2

Qualifying competition
2	(United States) Asia Muhammad	4	2
(Czech Republic) Petra Krejsová	6	6

==== Third qualifier ====
First round
3	(United States) Jamie Loeb	5	1
(Ukraine) Lyudmyla Kichenok	7	6
(Australia) Jessica Moore	4	4
7	(Japan) Miyu Kato	6	6

Qualifying competition
(Ukraine) Lyudmyla Kichenok	6^{2}	3
7	(Japan) Miyu Kato	7^{7}	6

==== Fourth qualifier ====
First round
4	(Czech Republic) Tereza Smitková	3	6	5
(Czech Republic) Andrea Hlaváčková	6	4	7
WC	(Netherlands) Merel Hoedt	2	4
12	(Czech Republic) Karolína Muchová	6	6

Qualifying competition
(Czech Republic) Andrea Hlaváčková	6	7^{7}
12	(Czech Republic) Karolína Muchová	4	6^{5}

==== Fifth qualifier ====
First round
5	(Germany) Antonia Lottner	7^{8}	6
WC	(Netherlands) Erika Vogelsang	6^{6}	1
WC	(Netherlands) Kelly Versteeg	2	6	1
9	(Switzerland) Amra Sadiković	6	4	6

Qualifying competition
5	(Germany) Antonia Lottner	6	6
9	(Switzerland) Amra Sadiković	2	2

==== Sixth qualifier ====
First round
6	(Liechtenstein) Kathinka von Deichmann	4	4
Alt	(Sweden) Cornelia Lister	6	6
(Thailand) Varatchaya Wongteanchai	6	1	6
8	(Hungary) Fanny Stollár	3	6	4

Qualifying competition
Alt	(Sweden) Cornelia Lister	6	6
(Thailand) Varatchaya Wongteanchai	3	0
