= 2009 Internazionali di Tennis di Bergamo – Singles =

Singles
- 2009 Internazionali di Tennis di Bergamo

Final
- Champion: (Czech Republic) Lukáš Rosol
- Runner-up: (Germany) Benedikt Dorsch
- Score: 6–1, 4–6, 7–6(3)

Events
Singles	Doubles
← 2008 ·	Internazionali di Tennis di Bergamo	· 2010 →

Andreas Seppi was the defending champion; however, he didn't take part in these championships this year.
Lukáš Rosol won in the final 6–1, 4–6, 7–6(3), against Benedikt Dorsch.

== Seeds ==
1. (France) Fabrice Santoro (quarterfinals)
2. (Germany) Björn Phau (semifinals)
3. (Czech Republic) Ivo Minář (first round)
4. (Kazakhstan) Andrey Golubev (first round)
5. (Germany) Michael Berrer (second round)
6. (Germany) Benjamin Becker (second round)
7. (Germany) Daniel Brands (second round)
8. (Germany) Simon Stadler (first round)

== Draw ==
=== Key ===
- Q = Qualifier
- WC = Wild card
- LL = Lucky loser
- Alt = Alternate
- SE = Special exempt
- PR = Protected ranking
- ITF = ITF entry
- JE = Junior exempt
- w/o = Walkover
- r = Retired
- d = Defaulted
- SR = Special ranking

=== Final four ===
Semifinals
(Czech Republic) Lukáš Rosol	7	6
(Kazakhstan) Mikhail Kukushkin	6^{6}	1
(Germany) Benedikt Dorsch	6	7
2	(Germany) Björn Phau	1	6^{2}

Final
(Czech Republic) Lukáš Rosol	6	4	7
(Germany) Benedikt Dorsch	1	6	6^{3}

=== Top half ===
First round
1	(France) F Santoro	6	6
(Germany) M Bachinger	1	2
WC	(Italy) D Bracciali	3	2
(United Kingdom) A Bogdanovic	6	6
(Czech Republic) L Rosol	6	7
(Australia) R Smeets	1	6^{0}
(Russia) M Elgin	2	5
5	(Germany) M Berrer	6	7
4	(Kazakhstan) A Golubev	6^{4}	4
WC	(Italy) M Crugnola	7	6
SE	(Belgium) R Bemelmans	6	5	3
(United States) B Evans	4	7	6
Q	(Canada) P-L Duclos	3	2
(Kazakhstan) M Kukushkin	6	6
SE	(Spain) D Marrero	6^{1}	6	3
7	(Germany) D Brands	7	3	6

Second round
1	(France) F Santoro	7	6
(United Kingdom) A Bogdanovic	6^{5}	4
(Czech Republic) L Rosol	2	7	6
5	(Germany) M Berrer	6	6^{7}	4
WC	(Italy) M Crugnola	6	7
(United States) B Evans	0	6^{6}
(Kazakhstan) M Kukushkin	5	6	6
7	(Germany) D Brands	7	2	4

Quarterfinals
1	(France) F Santoro	3	3
(Czech Republic) L Rosol	6	6
WC	(Italy) M Crugnola	2	6^{3}
(Kazakhstan) M Kukushkin	6	7

Semifinals
(Czech Republic) L Rosol	7	6
(Kazakhstan) M Kukushkin	6^{6}	1

=== Bottom half ===
First round
8	(Germany) S Stadler	5	2
Q	(Sweden) J Brunström	7	6
(Germany) B Dorsch	7	6
(India) P Amritraj	6^{5}	3
(Czech Republic) P Šnobel	7	6
(Slovakia) K Beck	5	3
Q	(Sweden) F Prpic	7	6
3	(Czech Republic) I Minář	6^{7}	4
6	(Germany) B Becker	6	6
(Italy) A Stoppini	4	4
(Russia) A Kudryavtsev	6	6
Q	(Italy) Giuseppe Menga	4	4
(France) S de Chaunac	6	6
WC	(Germany) F Mayer	4	4
WC	(Germany) F Krajinović	1	6^{7}
2	(Germany) B Phau	6	7

Second round
Q	(Sweden) J Brunström	6^{2}	4
(Germany) B Dorsch	7	6
(Czech Republic) P Šnobel	6	6
Q	(Sweden) F Prpic	3	4
6	(Germany) B Becker	6^{4}	4
(Russia) A Kudryavtsev	7	6
(France) S de Chaunac	6^{6}	3
2	(Germany) B Phau	7	6

Quarterfinals
(Germany) B Dorsch	6	7
(Czech Republic) P Šnobel	2	6^{4}
(Russia) A Kudryavtsev	5	4
2	(Germany) B Phau	7	6

Semifinals
(Germany) B Dorsch	6	7
2	(Germany) B Phau	1	6^{2}
