= 2011 Internazionali Trismoka =

Tennis tournament

- Date: 7–13 February
- Edition: 6th
- Location: Bergamo, Italy

Champions

Singles
- (Italy) Andreas Seppi

Doubles
- (Denmark) Frederik Nielsen / (United Kingdom) Ken Skupski
← 2010 ·	ATP Challenger Bergamo	· 2012 →

The 2011 Internazionali Trismoka was a professional tennis tournament played on indoor hard courts. It was part of the 2011 ATP Challenger Tour. It took place in Bergamo, Italy between 7 and 13 February 2011.

== ATP entrants ==
=== Seeds ===
Country	Player	Rank	Seed
ITA	Andreas Seppi	50	1
SVK	Karol Beck	100	2
ITA	Simone Bolelli	102	3
LUX	Gilles Müller	103	4
IND	Somdev Devvarman	110	5
JPN	Go Soeda	117	6
BEL	Olivier Rochus	119	7
FRA	Stéphane Robert	123	8

- Rankings are as of January 31, 2011.

=== Other entrants ===
The following players received wildcards into the singles main draw:

- (Lithuania) Laurynas Grigelis
- (Slovakia) Dominik Hrbatý
- (Sweden) Joachim Johansson
- (Italy) Andreas Seppi

The following players received a Special Exempt into the main draw:

- (Romania) Marius Copil
- (Germany) Dominik Meffert

The following players received entry from the qualifying draw:

- (Uzbekistan) Farrukh Dustov
- (Serbia) Dušan Lajović
- (Serbia) Boris Pašanski
- (Switzerland) Alexander Sadecky

== Champions ==
=== Singles ===
(Italy) Andreas Seppi def. (Luxembourg) Gilles Müller, 3–6, 6–3, 6–4

=== Doubles ===
(Denmark) Frederik Nielsen / (United Kingdom) Ken Skupski def. (Russia) Mikhail Elgin / (Russia) Alexander Kudryavtsev, walkover
