= 2017 Ricoh Open – Men's singles =

Men's singles
- 2017 Ricoh Open

Final
- Champion: (Luxembourg) Gilles Müller
- Runner-up: (Croatia) Ivo Karlović
- Score: 7–6^{(7–5)}, 7–6^{(7–4)}

Details
- Draw: 28 (4 Q / 3 WC )
- Seeds: 8

Events
Singles	men	women
Doubles	men	women
← 2016 ·	Ricoh Open	· 2018 →

The 2017 Ricoh Open was a tennis tournament played on outdoor grass courts. It was the 28th edition of the Rosmalen Grass Court Championships, and part of the 250 Series of the 2017 ATP World Tour, and of the WTA International tournaments of the 2017 WTA Tour. Both the men's and the women's events took place at the Autotron park in Rosmalen, 's-Hertogenbosch in the Netherlands, from June 12 through June 18, 2017.

Nicolas Mahut was the two-time defending champion, but lost in the second round to Julien Benneteau. Gilles Müller won the title, defeating Ivo Karlović in the final, 7–6^{(7–5)}, 7–6^{(7–4)}.

== Seeds ==
The top four seeds receive a bye into the second round.

1. (Croatia) Marin Čilić (semifinals)
2. (Germany) Alexander Zverev (semifinals)
3. (Croatia) Ivo Karlović (final)
4. (Luxembourg) Gilles Müller (champion)
5. (Belgium) Steve Darcis (first round)
6. (Netherlands) Robin Haase (first round)
7. (France) Nicolas Mahut (second round)
8. (United Kingdom) Aljaž Bedene (quarterfinals)

== Draw ==
=== Key ===
- Q = Qualifier
- WC = Wild card
- LL = Lucky loser
- Alt = Alternate
- ITF = ITF entry
- PR = Protected ranking
- SR = Special ranking
- SE = Special exempt
- JE = Junior exempt
- JR = Junior Accelerator Programme entrant
- CO = College Accelerator Programme entrant
- NG = Next Gen Accelerator Program entrant
- w/o = Walkover
- r = Retired
- d = Defaulted

=== Finals ===
Semifinals
1	(Croatia) Marin Čilić	6^{4}	7	6^{2}
3	(Croatia) Ivo Karlović	7^{7}	5	7^{7}
4	(Luxembourg) Gilles Müller	7^{7}	6
2/WC	(Germany) Alexander Zverev	6^{5}	2

Final
3	(Croatia) Ivo Karlović	6^{5}	6^{4}
4	(Luxembourg) Gilles Müller	7^{7}	7^{7}

=== Top half ===
First round
(Japan) Y Sugita	6^{5}	6	0
(Serbia) J Tipsarević	7^{7}	3	6
WC	(Netherlands) T Griekspoor	5	1
Q	(Canada) V Pospisil	7	6
(Ukraine) A Dolgopolov	6	7^{7}
5	(Belgium) S Darcis	2	6^{3}
(Germany) D Brown	3	6	3
WC	(United States) S Kozlov	6	3	6
(Russia) M Youzhny	4	5
PR	(Australia) T Kokkinakis	6	7
Q	(Russia) D Medvedev	7^{7}	3	6
6	(Netherlands) R Haase	6^{5}	6	3

Second round
1	(Croatia) M Čilić	6^{6}	6	6
(Serbia) J Tipsarević	7^{8}	2	4
Q	(Canada) V Pospisil	7^{7}	4
(Ukraine) A Dolgopolov	6^{2}	2^{r}
3	(Croatia) I Karlović	6	6
WC	(United States) S Kozlov	4	1
PR	(Australia) T Kokkinakis	3	6^{3}
Q	(Russia) D Medvedev	6	7^{7}

Quarterfinals
1	(Croatia) M Čilić	6	7
Q	(Canada) V Pospisil	3	5
3	(Croatia) I Karlović	6	6
Q	(Russia) D Medvedev	4	4

Semifinals
1	(Croatia) M Čilić	6^{4}	7	6^{2}
3	(Croatia) I Karlović	7^{7}	5	7^{7}

=== Bottom half ===
First round
8	(United Kingdom) A Bedene	3	6	6
(Uzbekistan) D Istomin	6	2	1
(United States) E Escobedo	6	6
LL	(Chinese Taipei) J Jung	4	2
(Italy) A Seppi	6	3	6
Q	(Japan) T Ito	3	6	3
7	(France) N Mahut	6	6
Q	(United States) D Novikov	3	4
LL	(France) J Benneteau	3	6	7^{7}
(Russia) E Donskoy	6	4	6^{5}
(Australia) J Thompson	4	1
(France) A Mannarino	6	6

Second round
8	(United Kingdom) A Bedene	6	6
(United States) E Escobedo	3	4
(Italy) A Seppi	6^{5}	4
4	(Luxembourg) G Müller	7^{7}	6
7	(France) N Mahut	6	2	2
LL	(France) J Benneteau	3	6	6
(France) A Mannarino	2	3
2/WC	(Germany) A Zverev	6	6

Quarterfinals
8	(United Kingdom) A Bedene	3	6	4
4	(Luxembourg) G Müller	6	3	6
LL	(France) J Benneteau	0	4
2/WC	(Germany) A Zverev	6	6

Semifinals
4	(Luxembourg) G Müller	7^{7}	6
2/WC	(Germany) A Zverev	6^{5}	2

== Qualifying ==
=== Seeds ===
1. (Russia) Daniil Medvedev (qualified)
2. (Canada) Vasek Pospisil (qualified)
3. (France) Julien Benneteau (qualifying competition, lucky loser)
4. (Chinese Taipei) Jason Jung (qualifying competition, lucky loser)
5. (Belarus) Egor Gerasimov (first round)
6. (Germany) Benjamin Becker (first round)
7. (Japan) Tatsuma Ito (qualified)
8. (United States) Dennis Novikov (qualified)

=== Qualifiers ===
1. (Russia) Daniil Medvedev
2. (Canada) Vasek Pospisil
3. (Japan) Tatsuma Ito
4. (United States) Dennis Novikov

=== Lucky losers ===
1. (France) Julien Benneteau
2. (Chinese Taipei) Jason Jung

=== Qualifying draw ===
==== First qualifier ====
First round
1	(Russia) Daniil Medvedev	6	6
Alt	(United States) Rajeev Ram	4	2
(United States) Tim Smyczek	6	4	6
5	(Belarus) Egor Gerasimov	3	6	4

Qualifying competition
1	(Russia) Daniil Medvedev	5	6	6
(United States) Tim Smyczek	7	4	4

==== Second qualifier ====
First round
2	(Canada) Vasek Pospisil	6^{9}	6	6
WC	(Netherlands) Matwé Middelkoop	7^{11}	1	3
(Greece) Stefanos Tsitsipas	6^{5}	6	7
6	(Germany) Benjamin Becker	7^{7}	3	5

Qualifying competition
2	(Canada) Vasek Pospisil	6	7^{9}
(Greece) Stefanos Tsitsipas	1	6^{7}

==== Third qualifier ====
First round
3	(France) Julien Benneteau	6	6
(Bosnia and Herzegovina) Aldin Šetkić	4	4
(South Korea) Kwon Soon-woo	6^{4}	7	2
7	(Japan) Tatsuma Ito	7^{7}	5	6

Qualifying competition
3	(France) Julien Benneteau	4	4
7	(Japan) Tatsuma Ito	6	6

==== Fourth qualifier ====
First round
4	(Chinese Taipei) Jason Jung	6	6
(United States) Mitchell Krueger	1	4
(Belarus) Ilya Ivashka	5	6^{3}
8	(United States) Dennis Novikov	7	7^{7}

Qualifying competition
4	(Chinese Taipei) Jason Jung	6^{6}	2
8	(United States) Dennis Novikov	7^{8}	6
