= 2016 Ricoh Open =

- Date: 6–12 June
- Edition: 27th
- Category: ATP World Tour 250; WTA International
- Draw: 32S / 16D
- Prize money: €566,525 (ATP) $250,000 (WTA)
- Surface: Grass
- Location: Rosmalen, 's-Hertogenbosch, Netherlands

Champions

Men's singles
- (France) Nicolas Mahut

Women's singles
- (United States) CoCo Vandeweghe

Men's doubles
- (Croatia) Mate Pavić / (New Zealand) Michael Venus

Women's doubles
- (Georgia (country)) Oksana Kalashnikova / (Kazakhstan) Yaroslava Shvedova
← 2015 ·	Rosmalen Grass Court Championships	· 2017 →

The 2016 Ricoh Open was a tennis tournament played on outdoor grass courts. It was the 27th edition of the Rosmalen Grass Court Championships, and part of the 250 Series of the 2016 ATP World Tour, and of the WTA International tournaments of the 2016 WTA Tour. Both the men's and the women's events took place at the Autotron park in Rosmalen, 's-Hertogenbosch in the Netherlands, from 6 June through 12 June 2016. Nicolas Mahut and CoCo Vandeweghe won the singles titles.

== ATP singles main-draw entrants ==
=== Seeds ===
Country	Player	Rank^{1}	Seed
ESP	David Ferrer	11	1
AUS	Bernard Tomic	22	2
CRO	Ivo Karlović	28	3
USA	Steve Johnson	34	4
USA	Sam Querrey	37	5
ITA	Andreas Seppi	38	6
LUX	Gilles Müller	42	7
FRA	Nicolas Mahut	44	8

- ^{1} Rankings are as of May 23, 2016.

=== Other entrants ===
The following players received wildcards into the main draw:

- (United States) Stefan Kozlov
- (France) Nicolas Mahut
- (Netherlands) Igor Sijsling

The following players received entry from the qualifying draw:

- (United States) Ernesto Escobedo
- (Slovakia) Lukáš Lacko
- (Russia) Daniil Medvedev
- (United States) Dennis Novikov

=== Withdrawals ===
Before the tournament

- (Spain) Pablo Carreño Busta →replaced by (Spain) David Ferrer
- (Ukraine) Alexandr Dolgopolov →replaced by (United States) Rajeev Ram
- (France) Richard Gasquet →replaced by (Croatia) Ivan Dodig
- (Belgium) David Goffin →replaced by (France) Adrian Mannarino
- (Portugal) João Sousa →replaced by (Israel) Dudi Sela
- (Spain) Fernando Verdasco →replaced by (Argentina) Horacio Zeballos
- (Germany) Alexander Zverev →replaced by (Germany) Benjamin Becker

== ATP doubles main-draw entrants ==
=== Seeds ===
Country	Player	Country	Player	Rank^{1}	Seed
IND	Rohan Bopanna	FRA	Nicolas Mahut	13	1
CRO	Ivan Dodig	USA	Rajeev Ram	37	2
GBR	Dominic Inglot	RSA	Raven Klaasen	45	3
CAN	Daniel Nestor	PAK	Aisam-ul-Haq Qureshi	67	4

- ^{1} Rankings are as of May 23, 2016.

=== Other entrants ===
The following pairs received wildcards into the doubles main draw:

- (Spain) Guillermo García López / (Netherlands) Robin Haase
- (Australia) Matt Reid / (Australia) Bernard Tomic

=== Withdrawals ===
During the tournament

- (Croatia) Ivan Dodig (illness)

== WTA singles main-draw entrants ==
=== Seeds ===
Country	Player	Rank^{1}	Seed
SUI	Belinda Bencic	8	1
SRB	Jelena Janković	26	2
FRA	Kristina Mladenovic	30	3
LAT	Jeļena Ostapenko	36	4
GER	Laura Siegemund	37	5
USA	CoCo Vandeweghe	43	6
CAN	Eugenie Bouchard	47	7
GER	Anna-Lena Friedsam	48	8

- ^{1} Rankings are as of May 23, 2016.

=== Other entrants ===
The following players received wildcards into the main draw:

- (Netherlands) Indy de Vroome
- (Hungary) Dalma Gálfi
- (Netherlands) Richèl Hogenkamp

The following players received entry from the qualifying draw:

- (Switzerland) Viktorija Golubic
- (Japan) Eri Hozumi
- (Serbia) Jovana Jakšić
- (Russia) Irina Khromacheva
- (Belgium) Elise Mertens
- (Japan) Risa Ozaki

The following player received entry as a lucky loser:

- (Serbia) Aleksandra Krunić

=== Withdrawals ===
Before the tournament

- (Hungary) Tímea Babos → replaced by (Croatia) Mirjana Lučić-Baroni
- (Germany) Annika Beck → replaced by (Serbia) Aleksandra Krunić
- (Italy) Camila Giorgi → replaced by (Ukraine) Kateryna Kozlova
- (Russia) Anastasia Pavlyuchenkova → replaced by (Slovenia) Polona Hercog
- (Czech Republic) Barbora Strýcová → replaced by (Kazakhstan) Yaroslava Shvedova

== WTA doubles main-draw entrants ==
=== Seeds ===
Country	Player	Country	Player	Rank^{1}	Seed
GEO	Oksana Kalashnikova	KAZ	Yaroslava Shvedova	54	1
CRO	Darija Jurak	AUS	Anastasia Rodionova	92	2
JPN	Eri Hozumi	JPN	Miyu Kato	129	3
SUI	Xenia Knoll	SRB	Aleksandra Krunić	139	4

- ^{1} Rankings are as of May 23, 2016.

== Champions ==
=== Men's singles ===
- (France) Nicolas Mahut def. (Luxembourg) Gilles Müller, 6–4, 6–4

=== Women's singles ===
- (United States) CoCo Vandeweghe def. (France) Kristina Mladenovic 7–5, 7–5

=== Men's doubles ===
- (Croatia) Mate Pavić / (New Zealand) Michael Venus def. (United Kingdom) Dominic Inglot / (South Africa) Raven Klaasen, 3–6, 6–3, [11–9]

=== Women's doubles ===
- (Georgia (country)) Oksana Kalashnikova / (Kazakhstan) Yaroslava Shvedova def. (Switzerland) Xenia Knoll / (Serbia) Aleksandra Krunić, 6–1, 6–1
