= 2016 Ricoh Open – Women's doubles =

Women's doubles
- 2016 Ricoh Open

Final
- Champions: (Georgia (country)) Oksana Kalashnikova (Kazakhstan) Yaroslava Shvedova
- Runners-up: (Switzerland) Xenia Knoll (Serbia) Aleksandra Krunić
- Score: 6–1, 6–1

Details
- Draw: 16
- Seeds: 4

Events
Singles	men	women
Doubles	men	women
← 2015 ·	Ricoh Open	· 2017 →

Asia Muhammad and Laura Siegemund were the defending champions, but Siegemund chose not to participate this year. Muhammad played alongside María José Martínez Sánchez, but lost in the quarterfinals to Alexandra Panova and Amra Sadiković.
Oksana Kalashnikova and Yaroslava Shvedova won the title, defeating Xenia Knoll and Aleksandra Krunić in the final, 6–1, 6–1.

== Seeds ==
1. (Georgia (country)) Oksana Kalashnikova / (Kazakhstan) Yaroslava Shvedova (champions)
2. (Croatia) Darija Jurak / (Australia) Anastasia Rodionova (quarterfinals)
3. (Japan) Eri Hozumi / (Japan) Miyu Kato (first round)
4. (Switzerland) Xenia Knoll / (Serbia) Aleksandra Krunić (final)

== Draw ==
=== Key ===
- Q = Qualifier
- WC = Wild card
- LL = Lucky loser
- Alt = Alternate
- ITF = ITF entry
- PR = Protected ranking
- SR = Special ranking
- SE = Special exempt
- JE = Junior exempt
- JR = Junior Accelerator Programme entrant
- CO = College Accelerator Programme entrant
- NG = Next Gen Accelerator Program entrant
- w/o = Walkover
- r = Retired
- d = Defaulted

First round
1	(Georgia (country)) O Kalashnikova (Kazakhstan) Y Shvedova	7	6
(Russia) V Dushevina (Latvia) J Ostapenko	5	3
(Japan) N Hibino (United Kingdom) E Webley-Smith	6^{3}	6^{2}
(Czech Republic) L Kunčíková (Czech Republic) K Stuchlá	7^{7}	7^{7}
3	(Japan) E Hozumi (Japan) M Kato	3	0
(Spain) MJ Martínez Sánchez (United States) A Muhammad	6	6
(Russia) A Panova (Switzerland) A Sadiković	6	3	[10]
(Belgium) E Mertens (Netherlands) D Schuurs	3	6	[2]
(Netherlands) I de Vroome (Netherlands) R Hogenkamp	7	2	[5]
(Australia) J Moore (Thailand) V Wongteanchai	5	6	[10]
(Russia) N Dzalamidze (Russia) I Khromacheva	3	2
4	(Switzerland) X Knoll (Serbia) A Krunić	6	6
(Serbia) J Janković (Belgium) A Van Uytvanck	6	6
(Chinese Taipei) C-w Chan (Bulgaria) A Naydenova	4	4
(Switzerland) B Bencic (Switzerland) V Golubic	3	4
2	(Croatia) D Jurak (Australia) An Rodionova	6	6

Quarterfinals
1	(Georgia (country)) O Kalashnikova (Kazakhstan) Y Shvedova	7^{7}	2	[10]
(Czech Republic) L Kunčíková (Czech Republic) K Stuchlá	6^{2}	6	[7]
(Spain) MJ Martínez Sánchez (United States) A Muhammad	4	7^{7}	[8]
(Russia) A Panova (Switzerland) A Sadiković	6	6^{3}	[10]
(Australia) J Moore (Thailand) V Wongteanchai	3	1
4	(Switzerland) X Knoll (Serbia) A Krunić	6	6
(Serbia) J Janković (Belgium) A Van Uytvanck	7^{7}	3	[10]
2	(Croatia) D Jurak (Australia) An Rodionova	6^{4}	6	[6]

Semifinals
1	(Georgia (country)) O Kalashnikova (Kazakhstan) Y Shvedova	6	6
(Russia) A Panova (Switzerland) A Sadiković	1	3
4	(Switzerland) X Knoll (Serbia) A Krunić	4	6	[10]
(Serbia) J Janković (Belgium) A Van Uytvanck	6	1	[6]

Final
1	(Georgia (country)) O Kalashnikova (Kazakhstan) Y Shvedova	6	6
4	(Switzerland) X Knoll (Serbia) A Krunić	1	1
