= 2011 Internazionali Trismoka – Doubles =

Doubles
- 2011 Internazionali Trismoka

Final
- Champions: (Denmark) Frederik Nielsen (United Kingdom) Ken Skupski
- Runners-up: (Russia) Michail Elgin (Russia) Alexandre Kudryavtsev
- Score: walkover

Events
Singles	Doubles
← 2010 ·	Internazionali Trismoka	· 2012 →

Jonathan Marray and Jamie Murray chose not to defend their 2010 title.
Frederik Nielsen and Ken Skupski won the title, because their opponents, Michail Elgin and Alexandre Kudryavtsev, withdrew before the final.

== Seeds ==
1. (United Kingdom) Colin Fleming / (Croatia) Lovro Zovko (first round)
2. (United States) David Martin / (Austria) Martin Slanar (first round)
3. (Thailand) Sanchai Ratiwatana / (Thailand) Sonchat Ratiwatana (first round)
4. (Germany) Martin Emmrich / (Poland) Mateusz Kowalczyk (first round)

== Draw ==
=== Key ===
- Q = Qualifier
- WC = Wild card
- LL = Lucky loser
- Alt = Alternate
- SE = Special exempt
- PR = Protected ranking
- ITF = ITF entry
- JE = Junior exempt
- w/o = Walkover
- r = Retired
- d = Defaulted
- SR = Special ranking

=== Draw ===
First round
1	(United Kingdom) C Fleming (Croatia) L Zovko	6^{5}	6	[9]
(Austria) M Fischer (Austria) P Oswald	7	1	[11]
(Poland) T Bednarek (Serbia) I Bozoljac	3	6	[10]
(Austria) N Moser (Latvia) D Pavlovs	6	3	[5]
3	(Thailand) Sa Ratiwatana (Thailand) So Ratiwatana	6^{2}	6^{4}
WC	(Italy) A Brizzi (Italy) M Volante	7	7
(Denmark) F Nielsen (United Kingdom) K Skupski	6	7
(Italy) T Fabbiano (South Africa) I van der Merwe	3	6^{4}
WC	(Italy) F Torresi (Italy) L Vanni	3	6	[11]
(Belarus) U Ignatik (Italy) A Motti	6	3	[13]
(Russia) M Elgin (Russia) A Kudryavtsev	6^{4}	6	[10]
4	(Germany) M Emmrich (Poland) M Kowalczyk	7	4	[8]
(Slovakia) K Beck (Slovakia) A Martin	w/o
(Italy) W Trusendi (Italy) M Viola
WC	(Slovakia) D Hrbatý (Slovakia) M Kližan	6	6^{5}	[10]
2	(United States) D Martin (Austria) M Slanar	4	7	[7]

Quarterfinals
(Austria) M Fischer (Austria) P Oswald	4	7	[10]
(Poland) T Bednarek (Serbia) I Bozoljac	6	6^{2}	[4]
WC	(Italy) A Brizzi (Italy) M Volante	3	4
(Denmark) F Nielsen (United Kingdom) K Skupski	6	6
(Belarus) U Ignatik (Italy) A Motti	4	4
(Russia) M Elgin (Russia) A Kudryavtsev	6	6
(Italy) W Trusendi (Italy) M Viola	6	6
WC	(Slovakia) D Hrbatý (Slovakia) M Kližan	4	4

Semifinals
(Austria) M Fischer (Austria) P Oswald	6^{3}	4
(Denmark) F Nielsen (United Kingdom) K Skupski	7	6
(Russia) M Elgin (Russia) A Kudryavtsev	6	6
(Italy) W Trusendi (Italy) M Viola	4	4

Final
(Denmark) F Nielsen (United Kingdom) K Skupski	w/o
(Russia) M Elgin (Russia) A Kudryavtsev
