= 2009 Internazionali di Tennis di Bergamo – Doubles =

Doubles
- 2009 Internazionali di Tennis di Bergamo

Final
- Champions: (Slovakia) Karol Beck (Czech Republic) Jaroslav Levinský
- Runners-up: (South Africa) Chris Haggard (Czech Republic) Pavel Vízner
- Score: 7–6(6), 6–4

Events
Singles	Doubles
- Internazionali di Tennis di Bergamo

Simone Bolelli and Andreas Seppi chose to not defend their 2008 title.
Karol Beck and Jaroslav Levinský won in the final 7–6(6), 6–4, against Chris Haggard and Pavel Vízner.

== Seeds ==
1. (Sweden) Johan Brunström / (Netherlands Antilles) Jean-Julien Rojer (semifinals)
2. (United States) Scott Lipsky / (United States) David Martin (first round)
3. (South Africa) Chris Haggard / (Czech Republic) Pavel Vízner (final)
4. (Czech Republic) David Škoch / (Slovakia) Igor Zelenay (quarterfinals)

== Draw ==
Key

- Q = Qualifier
- WC = Wild card
- LL = Lucky loser
- Alt = Alternate
- ITF = ITF entry
- PR = Protected ranking
- SR = Special ranking
- SE = Special exempt
- JE = Junior exempt
- JR = Junior Accelerator Programme entrant
- CO = College Accelerator Programme entrant
- NG = Next Gen Accelerator Program entrant
- w/o = Walkover
- r = Retired
- d = Defaulted

=== Draw ===
First round
1	(Sweden) J Brunström (Netherlands Antilles) J-J Rojer	7	6
(India) P Amritraj (United States) B Evans	5	2
(Kazakhstan) A Golubev (Kazakhstan) M Kukushkin	6^{5}	2
(Italy) M Crugnola (Czech Republic) P Šnobel	7	6
4	(Czech Republic) D Škoch (Slovakia) I Zelenay	6	6
WC	(Italy) F Colangelo (Italy) U Vico	3	3
WC	(Italy) A Motti (Italy) A Stoppini	7	3	[3]
(Slovakia) K Beck (Czech Republic) J Levinský	6^{6}	6	[10]
(Germany) B Becker (Germany) B Dorsch	6	7
(Russia) M Elgin (Russia) A Kudryavtsev	3	6^{3}
(Poland) T Bednarek (United Kingdom) A Bogdanovic	6^{3}	3
3	(South Africa) C Haggard (Czech Republic) P Vízner	7	6
(Germany) M Kohlmann (Germany) P Marx	6	7
WC	(Italy) D Bracciali (Italy) M Dell'acqua	2	6^{4}
(Germany) F Moser (Czech Republic) L Rosol	6	7
2	(United States) S Lipsky (United States) D Martin	2	6^{0}

Quarterfinals
1	(Sweden) J Brunström (Netherlands Antilles) J-J Rojer	7	6
(Italy) M Crugnola (Czech Republic) P Šnobel	6^{6}	4
4	(Czech Republic) D Škoch (Slovakia) I Zelenay	3	2
(Slovakia) K Beck (Czech Republic) J Levinský	6	6
(Germany) B Becker (Germany) B Dorsch	6	3	[8]
3	(South Africa) C Haggard (Czech Republic) P Vízner	3	6	[10]
WC	(Italy) D Bracciali (Italy) M Dell'acqua	6^{6}	6	[8]
(Germany) F Moser (Czech Republic) L Rosol	7	4	[10]

Semifinals
1	(Sweden) J Brunström (Netherlands Antilles) J-J Rojer	4	5
(Slovakia) K Beck (Czech Republic) J Levinský	6	7
3	(South Africa) C Haggard (Czech Republic) P Vízner	6	3	[11]
(Germany) F Moser (Czech Republic) L Rosol	3	6	[9]

Finals
(Slovakia) K Beck (Czech Republic) J Levinský	7	6
3	(South Africa) C Haggard (Czech Republic) P Vízner	6^{6}	4
