= 2016 Ricoh Open – Men's singles =

Men's singles
- 2016 Ricoh Open

Final
- Champion: (France) Nicolas Mahut
- Runner-up: (Luxembourg) Gilles Müller
- Score: 6–4, 6–4

Details
- Draw: 28 (4 Q / 3 WC )
- Seeds: 8

Events
| Singles | men | women |
| Doubles | men | women |
| ← 2015 · | Ricoh Open | · 2017 → |

Nicolas Mahut was the defending champion and successfully defended his title, defeating Gilles Müller in the final, 6–4, 6–4.

== Seeds ==
The top four seeds receive a bye into the second round.

1. (Spain) David Ferrer (quarterfinals)
2. (Australia) Bernard Tomic (quarterfinals)
3. (Croatia) Ivo Karlović (semifinals)
4. (United States) Steve Johnson (second round)
5. (United States) Sam Querrey (semifinals)
6. (Italy) Andreas Seppi (first round)
7. (Luxembourg) Gilles Müller (final)
8. (France) Nicolas Mahut (champion)

== Draw ==
=== Key ===
- Q = Qualifier
- WC = Wild card
- LL = Lucky loser
- Alt = Alternate
- SE = Special exempt
- PR = Protected ranking
- ITF = ITF entry
- JE = Junior exempt
- w/o = Walkover
- r = Retired
- d = Defaulted
- SR = Special ranking

=== Finals ===
Semifinals
7 | (Luxembourg) Gilles Müller | 7^{7} | 7^{7}
3 | (Croatia) Ivo Karlović | 6^{5} | 6^{4}
5 | (United States) Sam Querrey | 7^{7} | 4 | 4
8/WC | (France) Nicolas Mahut | 6^{5} | 6 | 6

Final
7 | (Luxembourg) Gilles Müller | 4 | 4
8/WC | (France) Nicolas Mahut | 6 | 6

=== Top half ===
First round
(Israel) D Sela | 7 | 6^{6} | 7^{7}
Q | (United States) D Novikov | 5 | 7^{8} | 6^{5}
(Canada) V Pospisil | 6^{7} | 2
(Spain) G García López | 7^{9} | 6
(Netherlands) R Haase | 6^{7} | 4
7 | (Luxembourg) G Müller | 7^{9} | 6
(Spain) Í Cervantes | 4 | 0
WC | (Netherlands) I Sijsling | 6 | 6
Q | (Russia) D Medvedev | 6 | 6
(Argentina) H Zeballos | 3 | 1
(France) A Mannarino | 6 | 6
6 | (Italy) A Seppi | 4 | 4

Second round
1 | (Spain) D Ferrer | 6 | 6
(Israel) D Sela | 4 | 4
(Spain) G García López | 5 | 1
7 | (Luxembourg) G Müller | 7 | 6
3 | (Croatia) I Karlović | 7^{7} | 7^{7}
WC | (Netherlands) I Sijsling | 6^{4} | 6^{5}
Q | (Russia) D Medvedev | 4 | 2
(France) A Mannarino | 6 | 6

Quarterfinals
1 | (Spain) D Ferrer | 6 | 4 | 6^{5}
7 | (Luxembourg) G Müller | 4 | 6 | 7^{7}
3 | (Croatia) I Karlović | 6 | 6
(France) A Mannarino | 3 | 4

Semifinals
7 | (Luxembourg) G Müller | 7^{7} | 7^{7}
3 | (Croatia) I Karlović | 6^{5} | 6^{4}

=== Bottom half ===
First round
5 | (United States) S Querrey | 7^{7} | 7^{7}
(Germany) B Becker | 6^{3} | 6^{5}
(Croatia) I Dodig | 3 | 6 | 0
(Japan) T Ito | 6 | 1 | 6
(Japan) Y Nishioka | 1 | 6 | 3
WC | (United States) S Kozlov | 6 | 2 | 6
8/WC | (France) N Mahut | 6 | 6
Q | (Slovakia) L Lacko | 1 | 4
(France) P-H Mathieu | 6 | 6
(United States) R Ram | 4 | 4
(United Kingdom) A Bedene | 7^{7} | 6
Q | (United States) E Escobedo | 6^{5} | 2

Second round
5 | (United States) S Querrey | 6 | 6
(Japan) T Ito | 3 | 4
WC | (United States) S Kozlov | 6 | 6
4 | (United States) S Johnson | 3 | 4
8/WC | (France) N Mahut | 4 | 6 | 6
(France) P-H Mathieu | 6 | 1 | 4
(United Kingdom) A Bedene | 4 | 3
2 | (Australia) B Tomic | 6 | 6

Quarterfinals
5 | (United States) S Querrey | 6 | 6
WC | (United States) S Kozlov | 3 | 0
8/WC | (France) N Mahut | 6^{5} | 6 | 6
2 | (Australia) B Tomic | 7^{7} | 4 | 2

Semifinals
5 | (United States) S Querrey | 7^{7} | 4 | 4
8/WC | (France) N Mahut | 6^{5} | 6 | 6

== Qualifying ==
=== Seeds ===
1. (Russia) Konstantin Kravchuk (qualifying competition)
2. (Slovakia) Lukáš Lacko (qualified)
3. (Switzerland) Marco Chiudinelli (qualifying competition)
4. (United States) Austin Krajicek (qualifying competition)
5. (Germany) Mischa Zverev (first round)
6. (United States) Dennis Novikov (qualified)
7. (United States) Ryan Harrison (first round)
8. (Colombia) Alejandro Falla (qualifying competition)

=== Qualifiers ===
1. (Russia) Daniil Medvedev
2. (Slovakia) Lukáš Lacko
3. (United States) Ernesto Escobedo
4. (United States) Dennis Novikov

=== Qualifying draw ===
==== First qualifier ====
First round
1 | (Russia) Konstantin Kravchuk | 6 | 6
WC | (Belgium) Ruben Bemelmans | 4 | 4
(Russia) Daniil Medvedev | 6 | 6
5 | (Germany) Mischa Zverev | 1 | 4

Qualifying competition
1 | (Russia) Konstantin Kravchuk | 3 | 1
(Russia) Daniil Medvedev | 6 | 6

==== Second qualifier ====
First round
2 | (Slovakia) Lukáš Lacko | 6 | 6
(Israel) Amir Weintraub | 2 | 3
(Australia) Matthew Barton | 4 | 5
8 | (Colombia) Alejandro Falla | 6 | 7

Qualifying competition
2 | (Slovakia) Lukáš Lacko | 7 | 6
8 | (Colombia) Alejandro Falla | 5 | 3

==== Third qualifier ====
First round
3 | (Switzerland) Marco Chiudinelli | 4 | 6 | 6
(Australia) Matt Reid | 6 | 3 | 4
(United States) Ernesto Escobedo | 7^{8} | 7^{7}
7 | (United States) Ryan Harrison | 6^{6} | 6^{4}

Qualifying competition
3 | (Switzerland) Marco Chiudinelli | 4 | 5
(United States) Ernesto Escobedo | 6 | 7

==== Fourth qualifier ====
First round
4 | (United States) Austin Krajicek | 7^{7} | 6^{5} | 6
WC | (Norway) Viktor Durasovic | 6^{1} | 7^{7} | 2
(Czech Republic) Michal Konečný | 7^{7} | 1 | 2
6 | (United States) Dennis Novikov | 6^{3} | 6 | 6

Qualifying competition
4 | (United States) Austin Krajicek | 6^{4} | 6^{5}
6 | (United States) Dennis Novikov | 7^{7} | 7^{7}
