= 2011 Internazionali Trismoka – Singles =

Tennis contest held in Trismoka

Singles
- 2011 Internazionali Trismoka

Final
- Champion: (Italy) Andreas Seppi
- Runner-up: (Luxembourg) Gilles Müller
- Score: 3–6, 6–3, 6–4

Events
Singles	Doubles
- Internazionali Trismoka

Karol Beck was the defending champion, but lost to Jürgen Zopp already in the first round.
Andreas Seppi won the title, defeating Gilles Müller 3–6, 6–3, 6–4 in the final.

== Seeds ==
1. (Italy) Andreas Seppi (champion)
2. (Slovakia) Karol Beck (first round)
3. (Italy) Simone Bolelli (first round)
4. (Luxembourg) Gilles Müller (final)
5. (India) Somdev Devvarman (withdrew)
6. (Japan) Go Soeda (second round)
7. (Belgium) Olivier Rochus (quarterfinals)
8. (France) Stéphane Robert (quarterfinals)

== Draw ==
Key

- Q = Qualifier
- WC = Wild card
- LL = Lucky loser
- Alt = Alternate
- ITF = ITF entry
- PR = Protected ranking
- SR = Special ranking
- SE = Special exempt
- JE = Junior exempt
- JR = Junior Accelerator Programme entrant
- CO = College Accelerator Programme entrant
- NG = Next Gen Accelerator Program entrant
- w/o = Walkover
- r = Retired
- d = Defaulted

=== Finals ===
Semifinals
1/WC	(Italy) Andreas Seppi	5
(Russia) Alexandre Kudryavtsev	2^{r}
4	(Luxembourg) Gilles Müller	6	7
(Estonia) Jürgen Zopp	4	6^{3}

Final
1/WC	(Italy) Andreas Seppi	3	6	6
4	(Luxembourg) Gilles Müller	6	3	4

=== Top half ===
First round
1/WC	(Italy) A Seppi	6	6
SE	(Germany) D Meffert	4	4
(Belgium) R Bemelmans	6	6
Q	(Serbia) B Pašanski	4	2
(Austria) M Fischer	3	2
WC	(Slovakia) D Hrbatý	6	6
(Belarus) U Ignatik	6	6
LL	(Italy) A Brizzi	3	2
3	(Italy) S Bolelli	1	4
(Germany) D Kindlmann	6	6
WC	(Sweden) J Johansson	7	6
(Germany) A Beck	5	4
(Russia) A Kudryavtsev	5
SE	(Romania) M Copil	2^{r}
(Italy) M Viola	4	3
6	(Japan) G Soeda	6	6

Second round
1/WC	(Italy) A Seppi	6	6
(Belgium) R Bemelmans	1	4
WC	(Slovakia) D Hrbatý	4	4
(Belarus) U Ignatik	6	6
(Germany) D Kindlmann	6	6^{7}	6
WC	(Sweden) J Johansson	3	7	3
(Russia) A Kudryavtsev	3	6	7
6	(Japan) G Soeda	6	2	6^{2}

Quarterfinals
1/WC	(Italy) A Seppi	6	6
(Belarus) U Ignatik	1	1
(Germany) D Kindlmann	5	4
(Russia) A Kudryavtsev	7	6

Semifinals
1/WC	(Italy) A Seppi	5
(Russia) A Kudryavtsev	2^{r}

=== Bottom half ===
First round
8	(France) S Robert	7	7
Q	(Uzbekistan) F Dustov	5	5
Q	(Serbia) D Lajović	3	3
(Denmark) F Nielsen	6	6
(Germany) M Bachinger	6	6
Q	(Switzerland) A Sadecky	4	2
(Poland) J Janowicz	3	6^{4}
4	(Luxembourg) G Müller	6	7
7	(Belgium) O Rochus	6	6
WC	(Lithuania) L Grigelis	4	4
(Slovakia) M Kližan	6	1	7
(Slovakia) A Martin	4	6	6^{3}
(South Africa) I van der Merwe	6^{3}	2
(Serbia) I Bozoljac	7	6
(Estonia) J Zopp	6	7
2	(Slovakia) K Beck	2	6^{4}

Second round
8	(France) S Robert	6	7
(Denmark) F Nielsen	4	6^{3}
(Germany) M Bachinger	4	6	6^{2}
4	(Luxembourg) G Müller	6	2	7
7	(Belgium) O Rochus	6	3	6
(Slovakia) M Kližan	2	6	3
(Serbia) I Bozoljac	6^{2}	2
(Estonia) J Zopp	7	6

Quarterfinals
8	(France) S Robert	6	3	6^{3}
4	(Luxembourg) G Müller	4	6	7
7	(Belgium) O Rochus	2	2
(Estonia) J Zopp	6	6

Semifinals
4	(Luxembourg) G Müller	6	7
(Estonia) J Zopp	4	6^{3}
