= Kelly Versteeg =

Dutch tennis player

- Country (sports): Netherlands
- Born: 1994
- Prize money: $36,587

Singles
- Career record: 116–126
- Career titles: 0
- Highest ranking: No. 497 (15 February 2016)

Doubles
- Career record: 99–75
- Career titles: 9 ITF
- Highest ranking: No. 402 (21 September 2015)

Kelly Versteeg (born 1994) is a retired Dutch tennis player.

In her career, she won nine doubles titles on the ITF Women's Circuit (all finals she played were at $10k level). She has career-high rankings by the Women's Tennis Association (WTA) of No. 497 in singles and 402 in doubles.

Versteeg made her WTA Tour main-draw debut at the 2017 Rosamlen Open, in the doubles draw, partnering Erika Vogelsang.

== ITF Circuit finals ==
=== Singles: 6 (0–6) ===
Result	No.	Date	Tournament	Surface	Opponent	Score
Loss	1.	19 July 2014	ITF Knokke, Belgium	Clay	(Netherlands) Quirine Lemoine	1–6, 0–6
Loss	2.	26 April 2015	ITF Ponta Delgada, Portugal	Hard	(Spain) Georgina García Pérez	2–6, 1–6
Loss	3.	28 June 2015	ITF Cantanhede, Portugal	Carpet	(Italy) Cristiana Ferrando	4–6, 6–7^{(6–8)}
Loss	4.	31 January 2016	ITF Saint Martin, Guadeloupe	Hard	(France) Irina Ramialison	1–6, 0–6
Loss	5.	25 June 2016	ITF Breda, Netherlands	Clay	(Germany) Vivian Heisen	2–6, 1–6
Loss	6.	20 November 2016	ITF Solarino, Italy	Carpet	(Russia) Liudmila Samsonova	6–3, 0–6, 1–6

=== Doubles: 17 (9–8) ===
Result	No.	Date	Tournament	Surface	Partner	Opponents	Score
Loss	1.	21 January 2013	ITF Antalya, Turkey	Clay	(Belgium) Elyne Boeykens	(South Korea) Lee Jin-a (South Korea) Yoo Mi	3–6, 4–6
Loss	2.	8 March 2013	ITF Amiens, France	Clay (i)	(Netherlands) Bernice van de Velde	(Germany) Lena-Marie Hofmann (Bulgaria) Isabella Shinikova	6–7^{(5–7)}, 1–6
Loss	3.	25 July 2013	ITF Maaseik, Belgium	Clay	(Netherlands) Bernice van de Velde	(Netherlands) Demi Schuurs (Netherlands) Eva Wacanno	2–6, 6–4, [7–10]
Win	1.	19 January 2014	ITF Tinajo, Spain (Lanzarote)	Hard	(Netherlands) Charlotte van der Meij	(Italy) Claudia Giovine (Italy) Alice Matteucci	2–6, 7–6^{(7–5)}, [10–6]
Loss	4.	21 March 2014	ITF Le Havre, France	Clay (i)	(Netherlands) Bernice van de Velde	(Bulgaria) Isabella Shinikova (Ukraine) Alyona Sotnikova	4–6, 3–6
Loss	5.	25 July 2014	ITF Maaseik, Belgium	Clay	(Netherlands) Bernice van de Velde	(Belgium) Steffi Distelmans (Belgium) Magali Kempen	4–6, 3–6
Win	2.	19 September 2014	ITF Pétange, Luxembourg	Hard (i)	(Belgium) Elyne Boeykens	(Slovakia) Michaela Hončová (Germany) Nora Niedmers	7–6^{(7–2)}, 6–1
Win	3.	6 December 2014	ITF Sousse, Tunisia	Hard	(Netherlands) Demi Schuurs	(Slovakia) Vivien Juhászová (Slovakia) Tereza Malíková	6–3, 6–0
Win	4.	27 June 2015	ITF Cantanhede, Portugal	Carpet	(Netherlands) Erika Vogelsang	(Spain) María Martínez Martínez (Spain) Olga Parres Azcoitia	7–5, 6–2
Win	5.	10 July 2015	ITF Knokke, Belgium	Clay	(Belgium) Elyne Boeykens	(Australia) Sally Peers (Belgium) Kimberley Zimmermann	6–2, 6–4
Win	6.	24 July 2015	ITF Maaseik, Belgium	Clay	(Belgium) Steffi Distelmans	(Germany) Katharina Hering (Germany) Lisa Matviyenko	6–1, 7–6^{(7–4)}
Win	7.	22 August 2015	ITF Oldenzaal, Netherlands	Clay	(Belgium) Steffi Distelmans	(Greece) Valentini Grammatikopoulou (Belarus) Sviatlana Pirazhenka	6–3, 7–5
Win	8.	28 August 2015	ITF Rotterdam, Netherlands	Clay	(Netherlands) Rosalie van der Hoek	(Germany) Katharina Hering (Switzerland) Karin Kennel	6–7^{(6–8)}, 6–1, [10–5]
Loss	6.	17 October 2015	ITF Heraklion, Greece	Hard	(Belgium) Steffi Distelmans	(Slovakia) Viktória Kužmová (Romania) Raluca Șerban	2–6, 0–6
Loss	7.	20 November 2015	ITF Helsinki, Finland	Hard (i)	(Belgium) Magali Kempen	(Russia) Daria Lodikova (Russia) Daria Mishina	6–3, 2–6, [5–10]
Win	9.	22 January 2016	ITF Petit-Bourg, Guadeloupe	Hard	(Netherlands) Rosalie van der Hoek	(Romania) Jaqueline Cristian (Italy) Gaia Sanesi	7–6^{(7–5)}, 6–1
Loss	8.	15 July 2016	ITF Knokke, Belgium	Clay	(Belgium) Déborah Kerfs	(United States) Frances Altick (Australia) Astra Sharma	4–6, 4–6
