= 2009 Internazionali di Tennis di Bergamo =

- Date: February 9 – February 15
- Edition: 4th
- Location: Bergamo, Italy

Champions

Singles
- (Czech Republic) Lukáš Rosol

Doubles
- (Slovakia) Karol Beck / (Czech Republic) Jaroslav Levinský
| ← 2008 · | ATP Challenger Bergamo | · 2010 → |

The 2009 Internazionali di Tennis di Bergamo was a professional tennis tournament played on indoor hard courts. It was part of the 2009 ATP Challenger Tour. It took place in Bergamo, Italy between 9 and 15 February 2009.

== Singles main-draw entrants ==
=== Seeds ===
| Country | Player | Rank | Seed |
|---|---|---|---|
| FRA | Fabrice Santoro | 58 | 1 |
| GER | Björn Phau | 95 | 2 |
| CZE | Ivo Minář | 101 | 3 |
| KAZ | Andrey Golubev | 115 | 4 |
| GER | Michael Berrer | 121 | 5 |
| GER | Benjamin Becker | 123 | 6 |
| GER | Daniel Brands | 136 | 7 |
| GER | Simon Stadler | 140 | 8 |

- Rankings are as of January 31, 2009.

=== Other entrants ===
The following players received wildcards into the singles main draw:

- (Italy) Daniele Bracciali
- (Italy) Marco Crugnola
- (Serbia) Filip Krajinović
- (Germany) Florian Mayer

The following players received entry from the qualifying draw:

- (Sweden) Johan Brunström
- (Canada) Pierre-Ludovic Duclos
- (Italy) Giuseppe Menga
- (Sweden) Filip Prpic

The following player received special exempt into the main draw:

- (Belgium) Ruben Bemelmans
- (Spain) David Marrero

== Champions ==
=== Men's singles ===
(Czech Republic) Lukáš Rosol def. (Germany) Benedikt Dorsch, 6–1, 4–6, 7–6(3)

=== Men's doubles ===
(Slovakia) Karol Beck / (Czech Republic) Jaroslav Levinský def. (South Africa) Chris Haggard / (Czech Republic) Pavel Vízner, 7–6(6), 6–4
