= Erika Vogelsang =

Dutch tennis player

- Country (sports): Netherlands
- Born: 1 March 1995 (age 30)
- Plays: Right (two-handed backhand)
- Prize money: $21,774

Singles
- Career record: 49–90
- Career titles: 0
- Highest ranking: No. 709 (21 November 2016)

Doubles
- Career record: 118–107
- Career titles: 8 ITF
- Highest ranking: No. 307 (2 July 2018)

Erika Vogelsang (born 1 March 1995) is a Dutch former tennis player.

She has a career-high singles ranking by the Women's Tennis Association (WTA) of 709, achieved on 21 November 2016. She also has a career-high WTA doubles ranking of 307, achieved on 2 July 2018.

Vogelsang made her WTA Tour main-draw debut at the 2017 Ricoh Open, in the doubles draw, partnering Kelly Versteeg.

== ITF finals ==
=== Doubles (8–8) ===
Legend
$15,000 tournaments
$10,000 tournaments

| Result | No. | Date | Tournament | Surface | Partner | Opponents | Score |
|---|---|---|---|---|---|---|---|
| Win | 1. | 23 March 2015 | ITF Le Havre, France | Clay (i) | (Netherlands) Mandy Wagemaker | (Italy) Alice Matteucci (Italy) Martina Trevisan | 6–1, 1–6, [10–6] |
| Win | 2. | 22 June 2015 | ITF Cantanhede, Portugal | Clay | (Netherlands) Kelly Versteeg | (Spain) María Martínez Martínez (Spain) Olga Parres Azcoitia | 7–5, 6–2 |
| Loss | 1. | 20 July 2015 | ITF Les Contamines, France | Hard | (Italy) Georgia Brescia | (Slovakia) Michaela Hončová (France) Shérazad Reix | 3–6, 4–6 |
| Win | 3. | 31 August 2015 | Duino-Aurisina, Italy | Clay | (Paraguay) Camila Giangreco Campiz | (Slovenia) Pia Brglez (Slovenia) Sara Palčič | 6–2, 7–5 |
| Win | 4. | 7 November 2015 | Stellenbosch, South Africa | Hard | (South Africa) Madrie Le Roux | (Zimbabwe) Valeria Bhunu (Namibia) Lesedi Sheya Jacobs | 7–6^{(6)}, 6–2 |
| Win | 5. | 14 November 2015 | Stellenbosch, South Africa | Hard | (United Kingdom) Francesca Stephenson | (South Africa) Ilze Hattingh (South Africa) Madrie Le Roux | 6–4, 6–4 |
| Loss | 2. | 23 January 2016 | Astana, Kazakhstan | Hard (i) | (Kazakhstan) Alexandra Grinchishina | (Russia) Olga Doroshina (Russia) Yana Sizikova | 4–6, 0–6 |
| Loss | 3. | 23 May 2016 | Antalya, Turkey | Hard | (United Kingdom) Francesca Stephenson | (Bosnia and Herzegovina) Anita Husarić (Colombia) Yuliana Lizarazo | 6–4, 4–6, [3–10] |
| Loss | 4. | 10 July 2016 | Amstelveen, Netherlands | Clay | (Netherlands) Mandy Wagemaker | (United States) Frances Altick (Australia) Astra Sharma | 4–6, 2–6 |
| Loss | 5. | 29 August 2016 | Schoonhoven, Netherlands | Clay | (Netherlands) Mandy Wagemaker | (Belgium) Déborah Kerfs (United States) Chiara Scholl | 1–6, 2–6 |
| Win | 6. | 20 November 2015 | Stellenbosch, South Africa | Hard | (Russia) Margarita Lazareva | (South Africa) Eden D'Oliveira (United Kingdom) Laura Deigman | 7–6^{(2)}, 6–1 |
| Win | 7. | 28 January 2017 | Almaty, Kazakhstan | Hard (i) | (Russia) Alina Silich | (Japan) Akari Inoue (Japan) Mai Minokoshi | 6–3, 4–6, [10–6] |
| Loss | 6. | 26 March 2017 | Óbidos, Portugal | Carpet | (Germany) Anna Klasen | (United Kingdom) Manisha Foster (Belgium) Hélène Scholsen | 6–7^{(6)}, 1–6 |
| Win | 8. | 2 April 2017 | ITF Óbidos, Portugal | Carpet | (Germany) Anna Klasen | (United Kingdom) Olivia Nicholls (United Kingdom) Laura Sainsbury | 6–3, 4–6, [10–6] |
| Loss | 7. | 24 June 2017 | ITF Alkmaar, Netherlands | Clay | (Belarus) Sviatlana Pirazhenka | (Australia) Sally Peers (Netherlands) Rosalie van der Hoek | 3–6, 1–6 |
| Loss | 8. | 17 September 2017 | ITF Antalya, Turkey | Clay | (Netherlands) Suzan Lamens | (Paraguay) Lara Escauriza (Chile) Bárbara Gatica | 5–7, 4–6 |
