= Gilles Müller =

Luxembourgish tennis player

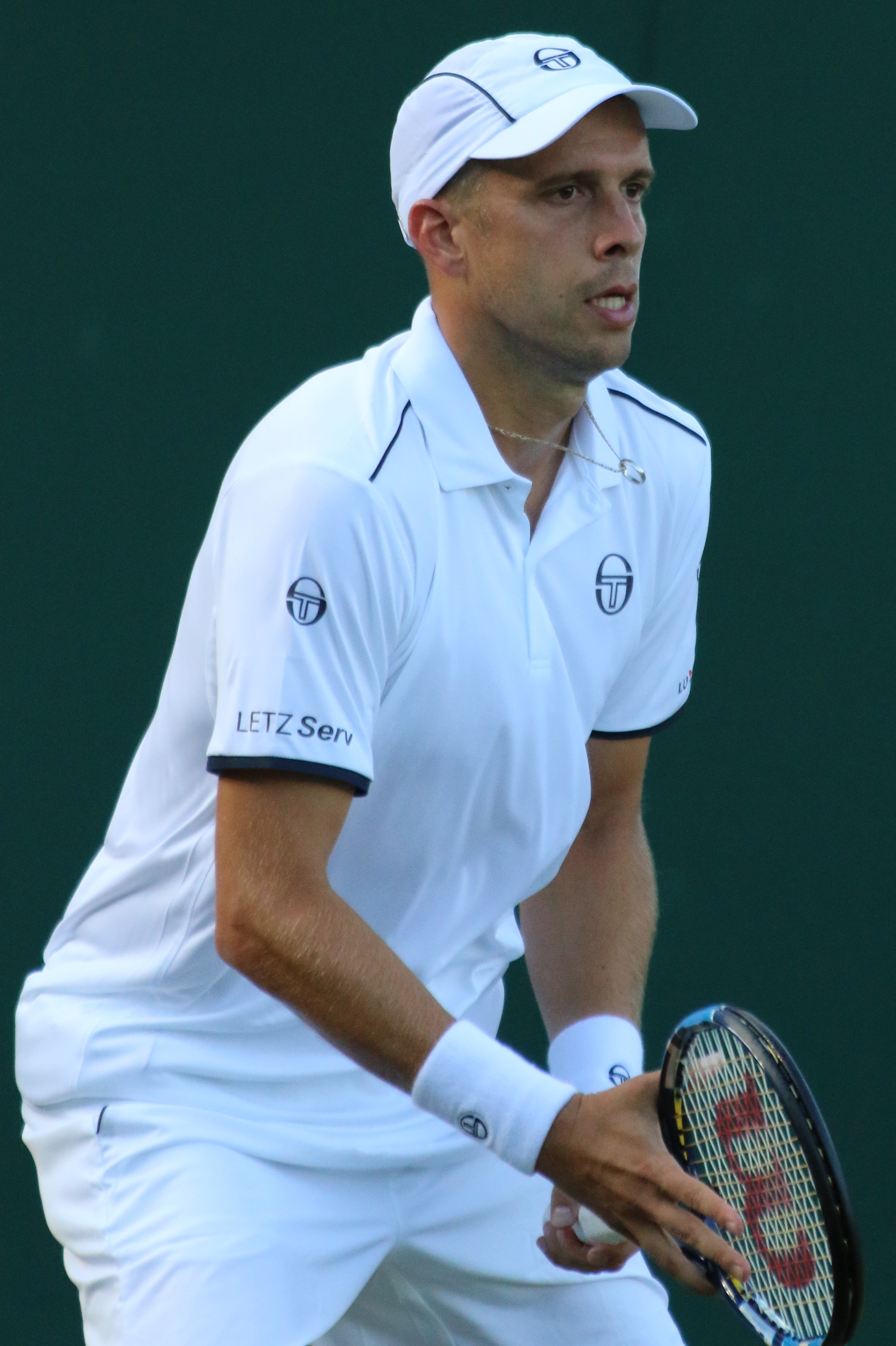
- Country (sports): Luxembourg
- Residence: Reckange-sur-Mess, Luxembourg
- Born: 9 May 1983 (age 42) Luxembourg City, Luxembourg
- Height: 1.93 m (6 ft 4 in)
- Turned pro: 2001
- Retired: 2018
- Plays: Left-handed (two-handed backhand)
- Prize money: US$5,991,874

Singles
- Career record: 233–213
- Career titles: 2
- Highest ranking: No. 21 (31 July 2017)

Grand Slam singles results
- Australian Open: 4R (2015)
- French Open: 2R (2012, 2015)
- Wimbledon: QF (2017)
- US Open: QF (2008)

Other tournaments
- Olympic Games: 3R (2016)

Doubles
- Career record: 61–88
- Career titles: 0
- Highest ranking: No. 74 (1 May 2017)

Grand Slam doubles results
- Australian Open: 2R (2016, 2017)
- French Open: 1R (2005, 2006, 2013, 2015, 2016)
- Wimbledon: 2R (2014, 2015)
- US Open: 2R (2015, 2016)
- Last updated on: 14 August 2021.

Gilles Müller (Luxembourgish pronunciation: [ˈʒil ˈmylɐ]; born 9 May 1983) is a Luxembourgish former professional tennis player. He is a two-time major singles quarterfinalist, making him by far the most successful male tennis player in Luxembourgish history. Müller won two titles on the ATP Tour and achieved a career-high ATP singles ranking of world No. 21 on 31 July 2017. He was known for his powerful left-handed serve and net skills. Following his retirement, Müller was appointed as Luxembourg's Davis Cup team captain.

== Career ==
=== Junior tennis ===
Müller played his first junior match in 1997 at the age of 14 at a grade 4 tournament in Luxembourg. 2001 was Müller's most successful year in juniors. He started off by making the semifinals of the Junior Australian Open where he lost to the No. 1 ranked junior Janko Tipsarević of Yugoslavia (1–6, 6–4, 2–6). Following an early exit at the Junior French Open, He reached the final of the Boys' Singles at the 2001 Wimbledon Championships, where he was defeated by Roman Valent of Switzerland (6–3, 5–7, 3–6). He won the Boys' Singles final at the 2001 US Open, defeating Taiwan's Yeu-Tzuoo Wang (7–6, 6–2). He attained No. 1 ranking on the junior circuit on September 10, 2001, and finished the year with the ranking. He ended his junior career after an early exit at the Orange Bowl with an overall singles record of 81–29 throughout his junior career.

Junior Grand Slam results – Singles:

Australian Open: SF (2001)
French Open: 3R (2001)
Wimbledon: F (2001)
US Open: W (2001)

=== 2001–2003: The beginning ===
Although beginning to play ITF events in 2000, Müller did not turn pro until 2001 at the age of 18. Between April 2001 and August 2002, He won a total of four ITF futures events. He made his ATP debut at the 2002 Rosmalen Grass Court Championships after receiving a wildcard into the singles main draw where he lost in the first round to Ivo Heuberger (2–6, 6–3, 6–7^{(8–10)}).

By the time 2003 came, Müller had already broke into the top 300 and started consistently playing in ATP Challenger Tour events where he made his first challenger final in April and won his first challenger title in July. He qualified for his second ATP event, the 2003 Copenhagen Open where he lost in the first round to Jean-René Lisnard (5–7, 4–6).

Müller entered the qualifying draws of the 2003 French Open and the 2003 US Open, losing both in the first round.

=== 2004–2005: ATP Tour finals and wins against top-10 players ===
Müller began 2004 with his first ATP Tour match win at the 2004 Auckland Open where he defeated Nicolás Lapentti (7–5, 6–7^{(3–7)}, 6–1) and his first grand slam at the 2004 Australian Open where he lost in the first round to David Ferrer (6–7^{(4–7)}, 1–6, 3–6). His breakthrough event came at the 2004 Legg Mason Tennis Classic where he made his first ATP Tour final and defeated 1st seed and world No. 6 Andre Agassi (4–6, 5–7) to register his first win over a top-10 player. He lost in the final to 2nd seed and world No. 8 Lleyton Hewitt (3–6, 4–6). His result at the tournament would push his ranking into the top-100 for the first time in his career. He also defeated world No. 10 David Nalbandian (7–6^{(7–4)}, 3–6, 4–6,) at the 2004 Japan Open for his second win over a top-10 player. He finished 2004 his a year-end ranking of 69.

At the 2005 Wimbledon Championships, Müller stunned 4th seed and world No. 3 Rafael Nadal (6–4, 4–6, 6–3, 6–4) in the second round. He lost in the third round to 27th seed Richard Gasquet (6–7^{(3–7)}, 3–6, 3–6). He made his second ATP Tour final at the 2005 Los Angeles Open where he lost to top seed and world No. 6 Andre Agassi (4–6, 5–7). At the 2005 US Open, he stunned 4th seed and world No. 3 Andy Roddick (6–7^{(4–7)}, 6–7^{(8–10)}, 6–7^{(1–7)}). He lost in the second round to eventual semifinalist Robby Ginepri (1–6, 1–6, 4–6). He finished 2005 with a year-end ranking of 76.

=== 2006–2007: Back outside of the top 100 ===
Müller's success started to die down in 2006. He started to get worse results in ATP events which dropped his ranking back outside of the top-100 to 105 by the end of the year. After January 2007, he returned to solely playing challenger events and had to start qualifying for grand slams and ATP events despite usually gaining automatic entry since 2005.

=== 2008: First Grand Slam quarterfinal ===
At the 2008 US Open, Müller, ranked 130 at the time, had to go through the qualification tournament. He reached the main draw and advanced to the quarterfinals of a Grand Slam tournament for the first time in his career, earnining a win over fifth-seeded Nikolay Davydenko in the fourth round. He lost to defending and eventual champion Roger Federer in straight sets (6–7, 4–6, 6–7).

=== 2009–2013: Struggles with injuries ===
On 19 January 2009, Müller beat Spaniard Feliciano López (6–3, 7–6, 4–6, 4–6, 16–14) in an epic four-hour, 24-minute match in the first round of the 2009 Australian Open. His run in the tournament ended in the third round by the eighth-seeded Juan Martín del Potro.

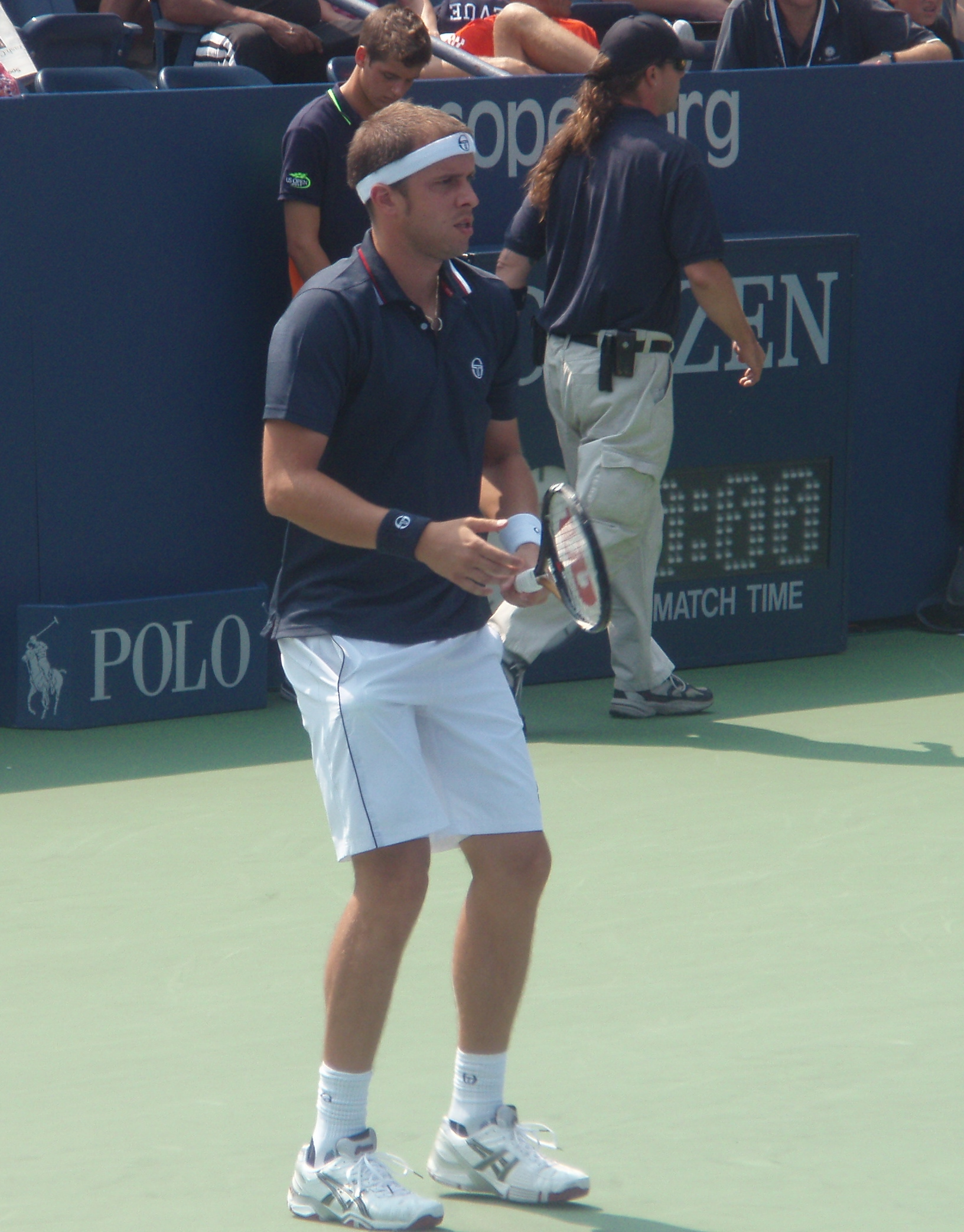
Müller at the 2011 US Open

In September 2011, he advanced to the fourth round of the US Open, losing to Rafael Nadal, whom he had already lost to in the third round of Wimbledon earlier that same year.

Müller registered his 100th singles win by defeating Australian Marinko Matosevic (7–6, 6–4) in Atlanta. He also reached his first ATP final in seven years at the 2012 Atlanta Open final, losing to Andy Roddick (6–1, 6–7, 2–6) after the American came back from one set and one break down to win what would be Roddick's last final on the ATP Tour.

Müller's final match in 2013 was at the 2013 French Open where he lost in round 1 to Roberto Bautista Agut. He finished the year at No. 368 in the world rankings after missing the second half of the season with an elbow injury.

=== 2014: Back inside the top 50 ===
In January, Müller returned to playing tennis and competed mostly on the Challenger Tour, winning five titles.

Müller qualified for the 2014 Wimbledon Championships where he lost to Roger Federer in the second round.

Müller lost in the first round at the US Open to Paul-Henri Mathieu (7–6, 5–7, 6–7, 7–6, 1–6).

Müller lost to Federer in the first round of the 2014 Swiss Indoors before falling in the qualifying rounds of the Paris Masters. He finished the season with a ranking of No. 47 and was elected Luxembourg's Sportsman of the Year.

=== 2015: Breaking the top 40 ===
Müller began 2015 at the Aircel Chennai Open, where he made the quarterfinals, losing to eventual champion Stan Wawrinka. He then competed in the Sydney International losing in the semifinals to Viktor Troicki, the eventual champion. He put together his best Australian Open campaign to date, losing in the fourth round to world No. 1 and eventual champion Novak Djokovic (4–6, 5–7, 5–7). His performance during the entire month saw him crack the top 40 for the first time in his career on 2 February.

He had a strong showing in Rotterdam, defeating David Goffin and Grigor Dimitrov, and then lost to Wawrinka in the quarterfinals. However, he fell out of the top 50 for the first time of the year on 11 May because he didn't defend his titles on the Challenger Tour.

Müller had a strong start to the grass court season, reaching the semifinals of the Topshelf Open as well as the quarterfinals at Queen's, beating defending champion Dimitrov for the second time in two meetings since the beginning of the year. He then lost to eventual champion Andy Murray.

This was followed by a semifinals appearance at the 2015 BB&T Atlanta Open, where he eventually lost to Marcos Baghdatis in three sets (7–6, 3–6, 6–7).

He also reached the quarterfinals of the Moselle Open in addition to the semifinals of the Rakuten Japan Open Tennis Championships.

Müller finished the season with a world ranking of No. 38 and was elected Luxembourg's Sportsman of the Year for the second year in a row.

=== 2016: Fourth and fifth ATP finals ===
He started 2016 by reaching the semifinals of both the Sydney International and the 2016 Garanti Koza Sofia Open.

At the 2016 Ricoh Open, he reached the final, losing to the defending champion Nicolas Mahut in straight sets. At the 2016 Aegon Open Nottingham, he reached the semifinals, falling to second-seeded Pablo Cuevas of Uruguay.

He advanced to the final of the Hall of Fame Tennis Championships, losing to second-seeded Ivo Karlović in three sets.

Müller represented Luxembourg in singles at the 2016 Summer Olympics, winning in the first round against Jerzy Janowicz and then beating Jo-Wilfried Tsonga in the second round before losing to Roberto Bautista Agut (4–6, 6–7).

At the 2016 Swiss Indoors, Müller defeated Grigor Dimitrov in the first round and then went on to reach the semifinals, falling to Kei Nishikori in three sets.

He finished 2016 with a ranking of No. 34 and was again elected Luxembourg's Sportsman of the Year.

=== 2017: Career-best year, top 25 debut and career-high ranking ===
Müller finally won his maiden ATP World Tour title at the 2017 Sydney International, over a decade after his first final. He saved a match point in the first round against Alexandr Dolgopolov. This came less than a week after he lost in the men's doubles final of the 2017 Brisbane International, playing alongside Sam Querrey.

He also made the final of Estoril, losing to Pablo Carreño Busta in what was his first ATP final played on clay. This resulted in him reaching a singles ranking of 26.

Then, at the 2017 Ricoh Open aged 34, Müller set up the oldest ATP World Tour tournament singles final in 41 years against Ivo Karlović, aged 38. He won the match in two straight tiebreaks (7–6, 7–6), claiming his second ATP Tour singles title in the process.

Despite being ranked 26 in the world, Müller's excellent form on grass in the last 12 months saw him earn a seeding of 16th at Wimbledon, where he made the quarterfinals after defeating world No. 2 Rafael Nadal in a five-set thriller, winning (6–3, 6–4, 3–6, 4–6, 15–13) in 4 hours and 48 minutes. The Luxembourger would subsequently have his run at The Championships ended by the eventual runner-up Marin Čilić, who beat him in another match that went five sets (6–3, 6–7, 5–7, 7–5, 1–6), after Müller experienced physical fatigue during the 5th set.

After reaching a career-high singles ranking of world No. 21 on 31 July and ending the season ranked world No. 25, he was elected Luxembourg's Sportsman of the Year for the fourth year in a row.

=== 2018: Final season ===
Müller entered an ATP tournament as a defending champion for the first time in his career at the 2018 Sydney International, ousting John Millman before subsequently losing to Benoît Paire. He then reached the third round of the 2018 Australian Open, ultimately bowing out to Pablo Carreño Busta in four sets.

Müller announced on 16 July that he would retire at the end of the season. He played his last match on the ATP World Tour at the 2018 US Open, losing in a five-setter to Lorenzo Sonego in the first round.

Müller was honored as one of the biggest retirees of the year at the 2018 ATP Finals alongside Florian Mayer and André Sá.

== National representation ==
=== Davis Cup ===
Müller made his Davis Cup debut for the Luxembourg Davis Cup team in April 2000 at the age of 16. He competed in 30 ties and out of 73 matches, he won 56 and lost 17, which made him Luxembourg's most successful Davis Cup player. Following his retirement in 2018, Müller was appointed as Luxembourg's Davis Cup team captain.

Müller led the team to a surprise victory against Finland in February 2004.

=== Olympic Games ===
Müller qualified for the Olympic Games twice: in London 2012 and in Rio 2016, reaching the second round at the former and the third round at the latter.

At the 2016 Summer Olympics Parade of Nations, Müller was the official flagbearer for Luxembourg.

== Post professional tennis career ==
=== TV Commentating ===
Following his professional tennis career, Müller has been working as a TV commentator for Tennis TV, World Feed, Amazon Prime Video UK & Ireland and SkySports among others. In this capacity Müller has been commentating on both men's and women's professional tennis tours.

== ATP career finals ==
=== Singles: 8 (2 titles, 6 runner-ups) ===
Legend Grand Slam tournaments (0–0) ATP World Tour Finals (0–0) ATP World Tour Masters 1000 (0–0) ATP World Tour 500 Series (0–0) ATP World Tour 250 Series (2–6)	Finals by surface Hard (1–3) Clay (0–1) Grass (1–2) Carpet (0–0)	Finals by setting Outdoor (2–6) Indoor (0–0)

Result	W–L	Date	Tournament	Tier	Surface	Opponent	Score
Loss	0–1	Aug 2004	Washington Open, US	International	Hard	(Australia) Lleyton Hewitt	3–6, 4–6
Loss	0–2	Jul 2005	Los Angeles Open, US	International	Hard	(United States) Andre Agassi	4–6, 5–7
Loss	0–3	Jul 2012	Atlanta Open, US	250 Series	Hard	(United States) Andy Roddick	6–1, 6–7^{(2–7)}, 2–6
Loss	0–4	Jun 2016	Rosmalen Championships, Netherlands	250 Series	Grass	(France) Nicolas Mahut	4–6, 4–6
Loss	0–5	Jul 2016	Hall of Fame Tennis Championships, US	250 Series	Grass	(Croatia) Ivo Karlović	7–6^{(7–2)}, 6–7^{(5–7)}, 6–7^{(12–14)}
Win	1–5	Jan 2017	Sydney International, Australia	250 Series	Hard	(United Kingdom) Dan Evans	7–6^{(7–5)}, 6–2
Loss	1–6	May 2017	Estoril Open, Portugal	250 Series	Clay	(Spain) Pablo Carreño Busta	2–6, 6–7^{(5–7)}
Win	2–6	Jun 2017	Rosmalen Championships, Netherlands	250 Series	Grass	(Croatia) Ivo Karlović	7–6^{(7–5)}, 7–6^{(7–4)}

=== Doubles: 2 (2 runner-ups) ===
Legend Grand Slam tournaments (0–0) ATP World Tour Finals (0–0) ATP World Tour Masters 1000 (0–0) ATP World Tour 500 Series (0–0) ATP World Tour 250 Series (0–2)	Finals by surface Hard (0–2) Clay (0–0) Grass (0–0) Carpet (0–0)	Finals by setting Outdoor (0–2) Indoor (0–0)

Result	W–L	Date	Tournament	Tier	Surface	Partner	Opponents	Score
Loss	0–1	Aug 2015	Atlanta Open, US	250 Series	Hard	(United Kingdom) Colin Fleming	(United States) Bob Bryan (United States) Mike Bryan	6–4, 6–7^{(2–7)}, [4–10]
Loss	0–2	Jan 2017	Brisbane International, Australia	250 Series	Hard	(United States) Sam Querrey	(Australia) Thanasi Kokkinakis (Australia) Jordan Thompson	6–7^{(7–9)}, 4–6

== ATP Challenger and ITF Futures finals ==
=== Singles: 31 (15–16) ===
Legend ATP Challenger (11–15) ITF Futures (4–1)	Finals by surface Hard (11–11) Clay (1–3) Grass (1–0) Carpet (2–2)

Result	W–L	Date	Tournament	Tier	Surface	Opponent	Score
Win	1–0	Apr 2001	Kuwait F1, Meshref	Futures	Hard	(Chile) Hermes Gamonal	4–6, 7–6^{(7–3)}, 7–6^{(8–6)}
Win	2–0	Feb 2002	Great Britain F3, Glasgow	Futures	Carpet	(Germany) Maximilian Abel	7–6^{(7–4)}, 7–6^{(7–3)}
Win	3–0	Apr 2002	Jamaica F3, Montego Bay	Futures	Hard	(France) Julien Cassaigne	6–3, 7–6^{(7–4)}
Win	4–0	Aug 2002	Brazil F2, Goiânia	Futures	Hard	(Brazil) Rodrigo Monte	3–6, 7–6^{(8–6)}, 6–1
Loss	4–1	Apr 2003	Napoli, Italy	Challenger	Clay	(France) Richard Gasquet	4–6, 4–6
Win	5–1	Jul 2003	Valladolid, Spain	Challenger	Hard	(Spain) Iván Navarro	6–4, 6–3
Loss	5–2	Apr 2004	Salinas, Ecuador	Challenger	Hard	(Colombia) Alejandro Falla	7–6^{(7–5)}, 2–6, 2–6
Win	6–2	Apr 2004	Napoli, Italy	Challenger	Clay	(France) Arnaud Di Pasquale	7–6^{(9–7)}, 6–7^{(1–7)}, 6–1
Loss	6–3	Jun 2004	Andorra la Vella, Andorra	Challenger	Hard	(United States) Kevin Kim	4–6, 0–6
Win	7–3	Jul 2004	Córdoba, Spain	Challenger	Hard	(Spain) Nicolás Almagro	6–1, 6–2
Loss	7–4	Apr 2006	Bermuda, Bermuda	Challenger	Clay	(Spain) Fernando Vicente	6–2, 2–6, 6–7^{(3–7)}
Loss	7–5	Oct 2007	Rennes, France	Challenger	Carpet	(Germany) Philipp Petzschner	3–6, 4–6
Loss	7–6	Oct 2007	Kolding, Denmark	Challenger	Hard	(Slovakia) Lukáš Lacko	6–7^{(3–7)}, 4–6
Win	8–6	Apr 2008	Humacao, Puerto Rico	Challenger	Hard	(Peru) Iván Miranda	7–5, 7–6^{(7–2)}
Win	9–6	Jun 2008	Izmir, Turkey	Challenger	Hard	(Denmark) Kristian Pless	7–5, 6–3
Loss	9–7	Jan 2010	Germany F1, Schwieberdingen	Futures	Carpet	(Netherlands) Jesse Huta Galung	2–6, 7–6^{(7–4)}, 3–6
Loss	9–8	Feb 2010	Bergamo, Italy	Challenger	Hard	(Slovakia) Karol Beck	4–6, 4–6
Loss	9–9	Mar 2010	Cherbourg, France	Challenger	Hard	(France) Nicolas Mahut	4–6, 3–6
Loss	9–10	Oct 2010	Tashkent, Uzbekistan	Challenger	Hard	(Slovakia) Karol Beck	7–6^{(7–4)}, 4–6, 5–7
Loss	9–11	Jan 2011	Nouméa, New Caledonia	Challenger	Hard	(Slovakia) Vincent Millot	6–7^{(6–8)}, 6–2, 4–6
Loss	9–12	Feb 2011	Courmayeur, Italy	Challenger	Hard	(France) Nicolas Mahut	6–7^{(4–7)}, 4–6
Loss	9–13	Feb 2011	Bergamo, Italy	Challenger	Hard	(Italy) Andreas Seppi	6–3, 3–6, 4–6
Win	10–13	Jun 2011	Nottingham, United Kingdom	Challenger	Grass	(Germany) Matthias Bachinger	7–6^{(7–4)}, 6–2
Loss	10–14	May 2012	Rome, Italy	Challenger	Clay	(Poland) Jerzy Janowicz	6–7^{(3–7)}, 3–6
Loss	10–15	Feb 2014	Astana, Kazakhstan	Challenger	Hard	(Kazakhstan) Andrey Golubev	4–6, 4–6
Win	11–15	Mar 2014	Guadalajara, Mexico	Challenger	Hard	(United States) Denis Kudla	6–2, 6–2
Win	12–15	Apr 2014	Shenzhen, China	Challenger	Hard	(Slovakia) Lukáš Lacko	7–6^{(7–4)}, 6–3
Win	13–15	May 2014	Taipei, Taiwan	Challenger	Carpet	(Australia) John-Patrick Smith	6–3, 6–3
Win	14–15	May 2014	Gimcheon, South Korea	Challenger	Hard	(Japan) Tatsuma Ito	7–6^{(7–5)}, 5–7, 6–4
Loss	14–16	Jul 2014	Potoroz, Slovenia	Challenger	Hard	(Slovenia) Blaž Kavčič	5–7, 7–6^{(7–4)}, 1–6
Win	15–16	Jul 2014	Recanati, Italy	Challenger	Hard	(Serbia) Ilija Bozoljac	6–1, 6–2

=== Doubles: 10 (4–6) ===
Legend ATP Challenger (3–5) ITF Futures (1–1)	Finals by surface Hard (3–4) Clay (1–0) Grass (0–0) Carpet (0–2)

Result	W–L	Date	Tournament	Tier	Surface	Partner	Opponents	Score
Win	1–0	Aug 2001	Luxembourg F1, Luxembourg	Futures	Clay	(Luxembourg) Mike Scheidweiler	(Canada) Stephen Adamson (Netherlands) Raoul Snijders	6–4, 6–3
Loss	1–1	Feb 2002	Great Britain F2, Glasgow	Futures	Carpet	(Luxembourg) Mike Scheidweiler	(Switzerland) Yves Allegro (Belgium) Arnaud Fontaine	3–6, 4–6
Win	2–1	Jun 2004	Andorra la Vella, Andorra	Challenger	Hard	(Pakistan) Aisam Qureshi	(Mexico) Santiago González (Mexico) Alejandro Hernández	6–3, 7–5
Loss	2–2	Jan 2005	Heilbronn, Germany	Challenger	Carpet	(Belgium) Gilles Elseneer	(France) Sébastien de Chaunac (Slovakia) Michal Mertiňák	2–6, 6–3, 3–6
Loss	2–3	Jul 2005	Córdoba, Spain	Challenger	Hard	(France) Nicolas Mahut	(Ukraine) Sergiy Stakhovsky (Belarus) Vladimir Voltchkov	5–7, 7–5, 3–6
Loss	2–4	Feb 2007	Brsancon, France	Challenger	Hard	(France) Gregory Carraz	(Germany) Christopher Kas (Austria) Alexander Peya	4–6, 4–6
Loss	2–5	Aug 2007	Segovia, Spain	Challenger	Hard	(Switzerland) Michel Kratochvil	(India) Rohan Bopanna (Pakistan) Aisam Qureshi	3–6, 6–7^{(8–10)}
Loss	2–6	May 2008	Lanzarote, Spain	Challenger	Hard	(Pakistan) Aisam Qureshi	(Poland) Łukasz Kubot (South Africa) Rik de Voest	2–6, 6–7^{(2–7)}
Win	3–6	Sep 2010	St. Remy, France	Challenger	Hard	(France) Édouard Roger-Vasselin	(Latvia) Andis Juška (Latvia) Deniss Pavlovs	6–0, 2–6, [13–11]
Win	4–6	Sep 2012	Orleans, France	Challenger	Hard	(Czech Republic) Lukáš Dlouhý	(Belgium) Xavier Malisse (United Kingdom) Ken Skupski	6–2, 6–7^{(5–7)}, [10–7]

== Junior Grand Slam finals ==
=== Singles: 2 (1 title, 1 runner-up) ===
Result	Year	Tournament	Surface	Opponent	Score
Loss	2001	Wimbledon	Grass	(Switzerland) Roman Valent	6–3, 5–7, 3–6
Win	2001	US Open	Hard	(Chinese Taipei) Jimmy Wang	7–6^{(7–5)}, 6–2

== Performance timelines ==
Key
W	F	SF	QF	#R	RR	Q#	P#	DNQ	A	Z#	PO	G	S	B	NMS	NTI	P	NH

(W) winner; (F) finalist; (SF) semifinalist; (QF) quarterfinalist; (#R) rounds 4, 3, 2, 1; (RR) round-robin stage; (Q#) qualification round; (P#) preliminary round; (DNQ) did not qualify; (A) absent; (Z#) Davis/Fed Cup Zonal Group (with number indication) or (PO) play-off; (G) gold, (S) silver or (B) bronze Olympic/Paralympic medal; (NMS) not a Masters tournament; (NTI) not a Tier I tournament; (P) postponed; (NH) not held; (SR) strike rate (events won / competed); (W–L) win–loss record.

=== Singles ===
Tournament	2000	2001	2002	2003	2004	2005	2006	2007	2008	2009	2010	2011	2012	2013	2014	2015	2016	2017	2018	SR	W–L	Win %
Grand Slam tournaments
Australian Open	A	A	A	A	1R	1R	2R	2R	Q1	3R	A	2R	1R	1R	A	4R	2R	2R	3R	0 / 12	12–12	50%
French Open	A	A	A	Q1	Q2	1R	1R	Q1	A	1R	A	Q2	2R	1R	A	2R	1R	1R	1R	0 / 9	2–9	18%
Wimbledon	A	A	A	A	Q1	3R	1R	2R	Q2	1R	Q3	3R	1R	A	2R	1R	2R	QF	2R	0 / 11	12–11	52%
US Open	A	A	A	Q1	Q1	2R	1R	Q1	QF	A	A	4R	2R	A	1R	1R	1R	2R	1R	0 / 10	10–10	50%
Win–loss	0–0	0–0	0–0	0–0	0–1	3–4	1–4	2–2	4–1	2–3	0–0	6–3	2–4	0–2	1–2	4–4	2–4	6–4	3–4	0 / 42	36–42	46%
ATP World Tour Masters 1000
Indian Wells Masters	A	A	A	A	Q1	3R	1R	A	A	A	A	A	2R	1R	A	2R	2R	3R	2R	0 / 8	5–8	38%
Miami Open	A	A	A	A	1R	1R	1R	Q1	Q1	1R	A	A	2R	1R	A	2R	1R	3R	2R	0 / 10	2–10	17%
Monte-Carlo Masters	A	A	A	A	A	A	A	A	A	A	A	A	A	A	A	A	1R	2R	2R	0 / 3	2–3	40%
Madrid Open	NH		A	A	Q1	A	A	A	Q1	A	A	A	A	A	A	1R	A	2R	A	0 / 2	1–2	33%
Italian Open	A	A	A	A	A	A	A	A	A	A	A	A	Q2	A	A	A	A	A	1R	0 / 1	0–1	0%
Canadian Open	A	A	A	A	A	Q2	Q1	A	A	A	A	A	A	A	A	3R	2R	A	A	0 / 2	3–2	60%
Cincinnati Masters	A	A	A	A	A	Q1	A	A	A	A	Q1	A	A	A	A	1R	A	2R	A	0 / 2	1–2	33%
Shanghai Masters	Not Masters Series									A	A	A	A	A	A	1R	A	A	A	0 / 1	0–1	0%
Paris Masters	A	A	A	A	A	A	A	A	A	A	A	1R	A	A	Q2	A	2R	A	A	0 / 2	1–2	33%
Win–loss	0–0	0–0	0–0	0–0	0–1	2–2	0–2	0–0	0–0	0–1	0–0	0–1	2–2	0–2	0–0	2–6	3–5	5–5	1–4	0 / 31	15–31	33%
National representation
Summer Olympics	A	Not Held			A	Not Held			A	Not Held			2R	Not Held			3R	Not Held		0 / 2	3–2	60%
Davis Cup	Z2	Z2	Z2	Z1	Z1	Z1	Z1	Z1	Z2	A	Z3	Z2	Z2	Z2	Z2	Z2	A	A	Z2	0 / 0	35–11	76%
Win–loss	3–0	2–3	3–0	2–1	3–1	1–2	2–0	1–3	2–0	0–0	5–0	3–1	2–1	2–0	2–0	2–0	2–1	0–0	1–0	0 / 2	38–13	75%
Career statistics
	2000	2001	2002	2003	2004	2005	2006	2007	2008	2009	2010	2011	2012	2013	2014	2015	2016	2017	2018	Career		
Tournaments	0	0	1	1	8	21	20	3	6	9	2	11	21	8	6	24	24	20	19	204		
Titles / Finals	0 / 0	0 / 0	0 / 0	0 / 0	0 / 1	0 / 1	0 / 0	0 / 0	0 / 0	0 / 0	0 / 0	0 / 0	0 / 1	0 / 0	0 / 0	0 / 0	0 / 2	2 / 3	0 / 0	2 / 8		
Hard Win–loss	0–0	0–0	3–0	1–2	12–8	13–13	10–10	2–5	5–4	4–5	1–1	15–11	14–14	4–4	3–5	25–18	22–17	16–12	6–10	1 / 132	156–139	53%
Clay Win–loss	3–0	1–2	0–0	1–0	0–0	4–5	3–5	0–0	2–0	0–1	0–0	0–0	4–2	0–4	2–0	3–3	0–2	5–4	1–4	0 / 30	29–32	48%
Grass Win–loss	0–0	0–0	0–1	0–0	0–0	3–3	0–4	1–1	0–1	1–3	1–1	2–1	4–5	0–0	1–1	5–3	13–5	11–2	3–5	1 / 37	45–36	56%
Carpet Win–loss	0–0	1–1	0–0	0–0	1–1	1–2	0–1	0–0	0–1	Discontinued										0 / 5	3–6	33%
Overall win–loss	3–0	2–3	3–1	2–2	13–9	21–23	13–20	3–6	7–6	5–9	2–2	17–12	22–21	4–8	6–6	33–24	35–24	32–18	10–19	2 / 204	233–213	
Win %	100%	40%	75%	50%	59%	48%	39%	33%	54%	36%	50%	59%	51%	33%	50%	58%	59%	64%	34%	52.24%		
Year-end ranking	840	535	255	195	69	76	105	117	95	248	134	54	67	368	47	38	34	25	138	US$5,991,874		

=== Doubles ===
Tournament	2005	2006	2007	2008	2009	2010	2011	2012	2013	2014	2015	2016	2017	2018	SR	W–L
Grand Slam tournaments
Australian Open	A	1R	A	A	A	A	A	A	A	A	1R	2R	2R	A	0 / 4	2–4
French Open	1R	1R	A	A	A	A	A	A	1R	A	1R	1R	A	A	0 / 5	0–5
Wimbledon	1R	1R	A	A	A	A	A	A	A	2R	2R	1R	1R	A	0 / 6	2–6
US Open	1R	A	A	A	A	A	A	A	A	1R	2R	2R	A	A	0 / 4	2–4
Win–loss	0–3	0–3	0–0	0–0	0–0	0–0	0–0	0–0	0–1	1–2	2–4	2–4	1–2	0–0	0 / 19	6–19
ATP World Tour Masters 1000
Indian Wells Masters	A	A	A	A	A	A	A	A	A	A	A	A	SF	QF	0 / 2	5–2
Miami Open	A	A	A	A	A	A	A	A	A	A	1R	A	2R	A	0 / 2	1–2
Monte-Carlo Masters	A	A	A	A	A	A	A	A	A	A	A	A	1R	A	0 / 1	0–1
Madrid Open	A	A	A	A	A	A	A	A	A	A	A	A	1R	A	0 / 1	0–1
Canadian Open	A	A	A	A	A	A	A	A	A	A	A	1R	A	A	0 / 1	0–1
Win–loss	0–0	0–0	0–0	0–0	0–0	0–0	0–0	0–0	0–0	0–0	0–1	0–1	4–4	2–1	0 / 7	6–7
Career statistics
Titles / Finals	0 / 0	0 / 0	0 / 0	0 / 0	0 / 0	0 / 0	0 / 0	0 / 0	0 / 0	0 / 0	0 / 1	0 / 0	0 / 1	0 / 0	0 / 2	
Year-end ranking	158	244	221	331	740	372	758	242	664	214	139	153	104	222		

== Wins over top 10 players ==
Season	2001	2002	2003	2004	2005	2006	2007	2008	2009	2010	2011	2012	2013	2014	2015	2016	2017	2018	Total
Wins	0	0	0	2	2	0	0	1	0	0	0	0	1	0	1	2	3	0	12

#	Player	Rank	Event	Surface	Rd	Score	GMR
2004
1.	(United States) Andre Agassi	6	Washington, D.C., United States	Hard	SF	6–4, 7–5	124
2.	(Argentina) David Nalbandian	10	Tokyo, Japan	Hard	3R	7–6^{(7–4)}, 3–6, 6–4	78
2005
3.	(Spain) Rafael Nadal	3	Wimbledon, London, United Kingdom	Grass	2R	6–4, 4–6, 6–3, 6–4	69
4.	(United States) Andy Roddick	3	US Open, New York, United States	Hard	1R	7–6^{(7–4)}, 7–6^{(10–8)}, 7–6^{(7–1)}	68
2008
5.	(Russia) Nikolay Davydenko	5	US Open, New York, United States	Hard	4R	6–4, 4–6, 6–3, 7–6^{(12–10)}	130
2013
6.	(France) Richard Gasquet	10	Marseille, France	Hard	1R	2–6, 6–4, 7–6^{(7–5)}	70
2015
7.	(France) Gilles Simon	10	Tokyo, Japan	Hard	QF	6–3, 6–4	43
2016
8.	(France) Jo-Wilfried Tsonga	9	Olympics, Rio de Janeiro, Brazil	Hard	2R	6–4, 6–3	37
9.	(Czech Republic) Tomáš Berdych	9	Tokyo, Japan	Hard	1R	7–6^{(9–7)}, 6–1	36
2017
10.	(Germany) Alexander Zverev	10	Rosmalen, Netherlands	Grass	SF	7–6^{(7–5)}, 6–2	28
11.	(France) Jo-Wilfried Tsonga	10	London, United Kingdom	Grass	2R	6–4, 6–4	26
12.	(Spain) Rafael Nadal	2	Wimbledon, London, United Kingdom	Grass	4R	6–3, 6–4, 3–6, 4–6, 15–13	26

== Record against top 10 players ==
Müller's ATP-only record against players who have been ranked world No. 10 or higher. Statistics correct as of 16 November 2024.

Player	Years	Matches	Record	Win %	Hard	Clay	Grass
Number 1 ranked players							
(United States) Andre Agassi	2004–2005	2	1–1	50%	1–1	0–0	0–0
(Spain) Rafael Nadal	2005–2017	6	2–4	33%	0–2	0–1	2–1
(United States) Andy Roddick	2005–2012	5	1–4	20%	1–4	0–0	0–0
(Spain) Juan Carlos Ferrero	2007	1	0–1	0%	0–0	0–0	0–1
(Australia) Lleyton Hewitt	2004–2012	2	0–2	0%	0–2	0–0	0–0
(Serbia) Novak Djokovic	2015–2016	4	0–4	0%	0–3	0–1	0–0
(Switzerland) Roger Federer	2005–2014	5	0–5	0%	0–4	0–0	0–1
(United Kingdom) Andy Murray	2011–2017	6	0–6	0%	0–4	0–1	0–1
(Russia) Daniil Medvedev	2018	1	0–1	0%	0–1	0–0	0–0
Number 2 ranked players							
(Germany) Tommy Haas	2006–2017	4	3–1	75%	1–1	1–0	1–0
(Germany) Alexander Zverev	2017–2018	2	1–1	50%	0–0	0–1	1–0
Number 3 ranked players							
(Argentina) David Nalbandian	2004	1	1–0	100%	1–0	0–0	0–0
(Bulgaria) Grigor Dimitrov	2012–2016	5	3–2	60%	2–1	0–0	1–1
(Canada) Milos Raonic	2011–2017	4	2–2	50%	1–1	0–1	1–0
(Spain) David Ferrer	2004–2016	2	1–1	50%	0–1	0–0	1–0
(Austria) Dominic Thiem	2016	2	1–1	50%	1–1	0–0	0–0
(Russia) Nikolay Davydenko	2006–2012	4	1–3	25%	1–2	0–1	0–0
(Argentina) Juan Martín del Potro	2000–2012	2	0–2	0%	0–2	0–0	0–0
(Croatia) Ivan Ljubičić	2006–2011	2	0–2	0%	0–2	0–0	0–0
(Switzerland) Stan Wawrinka	2015	3	0–3	0%	0–3	0–0	0–0
(Croatia) Marin Čilić	2016–2018	4	0–4	0%	0–1	0–0	0–3
Number 4 ranked players							
(Czech Republic) Tomáš Berdych	2016–2017	2	1–1	50%	1–1	0–0	0–0
(France) Sébastien Grosjean	2005	1	0–1	0%	0–1	0–0	0–0
(United Kingdom) Tim Henman	2004	1	0–1	0%	0–1	0–0	0–0
(Sweden) Robin Söderling	2009–2011	3	0–3	0%	0–2	0–0	0–1
(Japan) Kei Nishikori	2009–2017	4	0–4	0%	0–4	0–0	0–0
Number 5 ranked players							
(Argentina) Gastón Gaudio	2007	1	1–0	100%	1–0	0–0	0–0
(South Africa) Kevin Anderson	2008–2017	5	3–2	60%	2–1	1–0	0–1
(Spain) Tommy Robredo	2005–2017	2	1–1	50%	0–0	1–0	0–1
(France) Jo-Wilfried Tsonga	2014–2017	5	2–3	40%	1–2	0–0	1–1
(Chile) Fernando González	2006	1	0–1	0%	0–1	0–0	0–0
(Czech Republic) Jiří Novák	2004	1	0–1	0%	0–1	0–0	0–0
(Germany) Rainer Schüttler	2006	1	0–1	0%	0–0	0–1	0–0
Number 6 ranked players							
(Ecuador) Nicolás Lapentti	2004–2006	2	2–0	100%	1–0	1–0	0–0
(France) Gaël Monfils	2015–2016	3	1–2	33%	1–1	0–1	0–0
(France) Gilles Simon	2014–2015	3	1–2	33%	1–2	0–0	0–0
Number 7 ranked players							
(Belgium) David Goffin	2015	2	1–1	50%	1–0	0–0	0–1
(France) Richard Gasquet	2005–2015	6	2–4	33%	2–3	0–0	0–1
(United States) Mardy Fish	2011–2012	3	1–2	33%	1–2	0–0	0–0
(Spain) Fernando Verdasco	2005–2016	4	1–3	25%	1–2	0–1	0–0
(Sweden) Thomas Johansson	2005	1	0–1	0%	0–0	0–0	0–1
Number 8 ranked players							
(Russia) Karen Khachanov	2016	1	1–0	100%	1–0	0–0	0–0
(Australia) Mark Philippoussis	2005	1	1–0	100%	1–0	0–0	0–0
(Czech Republic) Radek Štěpánek	2005	1	1–0	100%	1–0	0–0	0–0
(Serbia) Janko Tipsarević	2002–2012	3	2–1	67%	1–1	1–0	0–0
(Russia) Mikhail Youzhny	2005–2018	7	4–3	57%	2–1	0–2	2–0
(Cyprus) Marcos Baghdatis	2015–2018	5	2–3	40%	1–2	0–1	1–0
(United States) John Isner	2010–2017	6	2–4	33%	1–4	0–0	1–0
(Austria) Jürgen Melzer	2005–2012	3	1–2	33%	1–0	0–1	0–1
(United States) Jack Sock	2015	1	0–1	0%	0–1	0–0	0–0
Number 9 ranked players							
(Spain) Nicolás Almagro	2008–2016	2	2–0	100%	2–0	0–0	0–0
(Italy) Fabio Fognini	2016	1	1–0	100%	1–0	0–0	0–0
(Chile) Nicolás Massú	2005	1	1–0	100%	1–0	0–0	0–0
(Spain) Roberto Bautista Agut	2013–2017	6	1–5	17%	1–3	0–2	0–0
Number 10 ranked players							
(Spain) Félix Mantilla	2005	1	1–0	100%	0–0	0–0	1–0
(Canada) Denis Shapovalov	2018	1	1–0	100%	0–0	0–0	1–0
(Latvia) Ernests Gulbis	2011–2018	2	1–1	50%	1–0	0–1	0–0
(Spain) Pablo Carreño Busta	2015–2018	4	1–3	25%	1–1	0–2	0–0
(Argentina) Juan Mónaco	2006	1	0–1	0%	0–0	0–1	0–0
(France) Arnaud Clément	2004–2005	2	0–2	0%	0–2	0–0	0–0
Total	2002–2018	167	57–110	34%	38–75	5–19	14–16

Olympic Games
Preceded by Marie Muller	Flagbearer for Luxembourg; Rio de Janeiro 2016	Succeeded by Christine Majerus & Raphaël Stacchiotti
