= 2013 Topshelf Open =

- Date: 16–22 June
- Edition: 24th
- Category: 250 Series (ATP); Internat. tournaments (WTA)
- Draw: 32S / 16D; 32S / 16D
- Prize money: €467,800 $235,000
- Surface: Grass
- Location: Rosmalen, 's-Hertogenbosch, Netherlands

Champions

Men's singles
- (France) Nicolas Mahut

Women's singles
- (Romania) Simona Halep

Men's doubles
- (Belarus) Max Mirnyi / (Romania) Horia Tecău

Women's doubles
- (Romania) Irina-Camelia Begu / (Spain) Anabel Medina Garrigues
← 2012 ·	Topshelf Open	· 2014 →

The 2013 Topshelf Open was a tennis tournament played on outdoor grass courts. It was the 24th edition of the Rosmalen Grass Court Championships, and was part of the 250 Series of the 2013 ATP World Tour, and of the WTA International tournaments of the 2013 WTA Tour. Both the men's and the women's events took place at the Autotron park in Rosmalen, 's-Hertogenbosch, Netherlands, from 16 June until 22 June 2013.

== Finals ==
=== Men's singles ===
- (France) Nicolas Mahut defeated (Switzerland) Stanislas Wawrinka, 6–3, 6–4
- It was Mahut first title of the career.

=== Women's singles ===
- (Romania) Simona Halep defeated (Belgium) Kirsten Flipkens, 6–4, 6–2
- It was Halep's second title of the year and second of her career, a week after winning her first at Nürnberger Versicherungscup

=== Men's doubles ===
- (Belarus) Max Mirnyi / (Romania) Horia Tecău defeated (Germany) Andre Begemann / (Germany) Martin Emmrich, 6–3, 7–6^{(7–4)}

=== Women's doubles ===
- (Romania) Irina-Camelia Begu / (Spain) Anabel Medina Garrigues defeated (Slovakia) Dominika Cibulková / (Spain) Arantxa Parra Santonja, 4–6, 7–6^{(7–3)}, [11–9]

== ATP singles main-draw entrants ==
=== Seeds ===
Country	Player	Rank^{1}	Seed
ESP	David Ferrer	4	1
SUI	Stanislas Wawrinka	10	2
USA	John Isner	21	3
FRA	Benoît Paire	25	4
FRA	Jérémy Chardy	27	5
CYP	Marcos Baghdatis	40	6
ROU	Victor Hănescu	49	7
ESP	Daniel Gimeno Traver	50	8

- ^{1}Seedings are based on the rankings as of June 10, 2013.

=== Other entrants ===
The following players received wildcards into the main draw:

- (Romania) Marius Copil
- (Netherlands) Thiemo de Bakker
- (Netherlands) Jesse Huta Galung

The following players received entry from the qualifying draw:

- (Switzerland) Stéphane Bohli
- (Czech Republic) Jan Hernych
- (France) Nicolas Mahut
- (France) Lucas Pouille

The following player received entry as lucky loser:

- (Belgium) Steve Darcis

=== Withdrawals ===
Before the tournament

- (Colombia) Alejandro Falla
- (Spain) Marcel Granollers
- (Austria) Jürgen Melzer
- (Netherlands) Igor Sijsling (illness)
- (Russia) Dmitry Tursunov

=== Retirements ===
- (France) Benoît Paire (thigh injury)

== ATP doubles main-draw entrants ==
=== Seeds ===
Country	Player	Country	Player	Rank^{1}	Seed
PAK	Aisam-ul-Haq Qureshi	NED	Jean-Julien Rojer	23	1
BLR	Max Mirnyi	ROU	Horia Tecău	31	2
MEX	Santiago González	USA	Scott Lipsky	48	3
FRA	Michaël Llodra	FRA	Nicolas Mahut	57	4

- Rankings are as of June 10, 2013.

=== Other entrants ===
The following pairs received wildcards into the doubles main draw:

- (Netherlands) Thiemo de Bakker / (Netherlands) Jesse Huta Galung
- (Belgium) David Goffin / (Belgium) Dick Norman

The following pair received entry as alternates:

- (Russia) Evgeny Donskoy / (Russia) Alex Kuznetsov

=== Withdrawals ===
Before the tournament

- (Netherlands) Igor Sijsling (illness)

During the tournament

- (France) Benoît Paire (thigh injury)

== WTA singles main-draw entrants ==
=== Seeds ===
Country	Player	Rank^{1}	Seed
ITA	Roberta Vinci	11	1
SVK	Dominika Cibulková	18	2
ESP	Carla Suárez Navarro	19	3
BEL	Kirsten Flipkens	20	4
GER	Mona Barthel	31	5
~~SUI~~	~~Romina Oprandi~~	~~32~~	~~6~~
POL	Urszula Radwańska	38	7
FRA	Kristina Mladenovic	39	8

- ^{1}Seedings are based on the rankings as of June 10, 2013.

=== Other entrants ===
The following players received wildcards into the main draw:

- (Netherlands) Michaëlla Krajicek
- (Netherlands) Arantxa Rus
- (Slovakia) Daniela Hantuchová

The following players received entry from the qualifying draw:

- (Czech Republic) Andrea Hlaváčková
- (Belgium) An-Sophie Mestach
- (Spain) Garbiñe Muguruza
- (Kazakhstan) Yulia Putintseva

The following player received entry as lucky loser:

- (Ukraine) Lesia Tsurenko

=== Withdrawals ===
Before the tournament

- (Switzerland) Romina Oprandi (right shoulder injury)

=== Retirements ===
- (Slovakia) Daniela Hantuchová (dizziness)
- (Slovakia) Magdaléna Rybáriková (low back injury)

== WTA doubles main-draw entrants ==
=== Seeds ===
Country	Player	Country	Player	Rank^{1}	Seed
SVK	Daniela Hantuchová	CZE	Andrea Hlaváčková	56	1
ROU	Irina-Camelia Begu	ESP	Anabel Medina Garrigues	94	2
JPN	Shuko Aoyama	USA	Megan Moulton-Levy	124	3
POR	Nina Bratchikova	BLR	Olga Govortsova	150	4

- ^{1} Rankings are as of June 10, 2013.

=== Other entrants ===
The following pairs received wildcards into the doubles main draw:

- (Netherlands) Demi Schuurs / (Netherlands) Angelique van der Meet

=== Withdrawals ===
During the tournament

- (Slovakia) Daniela Hantuchová (dizziness)
