= 2015 Topshelf Open =

- Date: 8–14 June
- Edition: 26th
- Category: ATP World Tour 250; WTA International
- Draw: 32S / 16D
- Prize money: €604,155 (ATP) $250,000 (WTA)
- Surface: Grass
- Location: Rosmalen, 's-Hertogenbosch, Netherlands

Champions

Men's singles
- (France) Nicolas Mahut

Women's singles
- (Italy) Camila Giorgi

Men's doubles
- (Croatia) Ivo Karlović / (Poland) Łukasz Kubot

Women's doubles
- (United States) Asia Muhammad / (Germany) Laura Siegemund
← 2014 ·	Topshelf Open	· 2016 →

The 2015 Topshelf Open was a tennis tournament played on outdoor grass courts. It was the 26th edition of the Rosmalen Grass Court Championships, and was part of the 250 Series of the 2015 ATP World Tour, and of the WTA International tournaments of the 2015 WTA Tour. Both the men's and the women's events took place at the Autotron park in Rosmalen, 's-Hertogenbosch in the Netherlands, from June 8 through June 14, 2015.

== Points and prize money ==
=== Point distribution ===
Event	W	F	SF	QF	Round of 16	Round of 32	Q	Q3	Q2	Q1
Men's singles	250	150	90	45	20	0	12	6	0	0
Men's doubles	250	150	90	45	0	—	—	—	—	—
Women's singles	280	180	110	60	30	1	18	14	10	1
Women's doubles	280	180	110	60	1	—	—	—	—	—

=== Prize money ===
Event	W	F	SF	QF	Round of 16	Round of 32	Q3	Q2
Men's singles	€97,700	€51,450	€27,870	€15,880	€9,360	€5,540	€900	€430
Women's singles	$43,000	$21,400	$11,300	$5,900	$3,310	$1,925	$1,005	$730
Men's doubles	€29,680	€15,600	€8,450	€4,830	€2,830	—	—	—
Women's doubles	$12,300	$6,400	$3,435	$1,820	$960	—	—	—

== ATP singles main-draw entrants ==
=== Seeds ===
Country	Player	Rank^{1}	Seed
~~FRA~~	~~Jo-Wilfried Tsonga~~	~~15~~	~~1~~
BEL	David Goffin	18	2
ESP	Roberto Bautista Agut	20	3
ESP	Guillermo García López	24	4
CRO	Ivo Karlović	25	5
FRA	Adrian Mannarino	32	6
ESP	Fernando Verdasco	34	7
POR	João Sousa	44	8
CAN	Vasek Pospisil	53	9

- ^{1} Rankings are as of May 25, 2015.

=== Other entrants ===
The following players received wildcards into the main draw:

- (Romania) Marius Copil
- (Netherlands) Robin Haase
- (Australia) Lleyton Hewitt

The following players received entry from the qualifying draw:

- (Switzerland) Marco Chiudinelli
- (Japan) Tatsuma Ito
- (France) Nicolas Mahut
- (Ukraine) Illya Marchenko

The following player received entry as a lucky loser:

- (France) Kenny de Schepper

=== Withdrawals ===
Before the tournament

- (Italy) Simone Bolelli → replaced by Jürgen Melzer
- (Dominican Republic) Víctor Estrella Burgos → replaced by Ričardas Berankis
- (France) Richard Gasquet → replaced by Marinko Matosevic
- (United States) Steve Johnson → replaced by Marsel İlhan
- (Australia) Nick Kyrgios → replaced by Blaž Kavčič
- (France) Jo-Wilfried Tsonga → replaced by Kenny de Schepper

== ATP doubles main-draw entrants ==
=== Seeds ===
Country	Player	Country	Player	Rank^{1}	Seed
NED	Jean-Julien Rojer	ROU	Horia Tecău	21	1
CAN	Daniel Nestor	IND	Leander Paes	49	2
GBR	Jamie Murray	AUS	John Peers	51	3
CRO	Marin Draganja	FIN	Henri Kontinen	52	4

- ^{1} Rankings are as of May 25, 2015.

=== Other entrants ===
The following pairs received wildcards into the doubles main draw:

- (Netherlands) Robin Haase / (France) Benoît Paire
- (Australia) Lleyton Hewitt / (Australia) Matt Reid

=== Withdrawals ===
During the tournament

- (Australia) Matt Reid (right wrist injury)

== WTA singles main-draw entrants ==
=== Seeds ===
Country	Player	Rank^{1}	Seed
CAN	Eugenie Bouchard	6	1
SRB	Jelena Janković	25	2
USA	CoCo Vandeweghe	33	3
SUI	Belinda Bencic	35	4
ITA	Camila Giorgi	37	5
RUS	Anastasia Pavlyuchenkova	39	6
FRA	Kristina Mladenovic	44	7
SWE	Johanna Larsson	54	8

- ^{1} Rankings are as of May 25, 2015.

=== Other entrants ===
The following players received wildcards into the main draw:

- (Canada) Eugenie Bouchard
- (France) Océane Dodin
- (Netherlands) Michaëlla Krajicek

The following players received entry from the qualifying draw:

- (Czech Republic) Andrea Hlaváčková
- (United States) Jessica Pegula
- (Poland) Urszula Radwańska
- (United States) Maria Sanchez

=== Withdrawals ===
Before the tournament

- (United States) Madison Brengle →replaced by Evgeniya Rodina
- (Slovakia) Dominika Cibulková →replaced by Kiki Bertens
- (Russia) Daria Gavrilova →replaced by Tímea Babos
- (Germany) Andrea Petkovic →replaced by Tatjana Maria
- (Ukraine) Elina Svitolina →replaced by Alison Van Uytvanck

== WTA doubles main-draw entrants ==
=== Seeds ===
Country	Player	Country	Player	Rank^{1}	Seed
HUN	Tímea Babos	FRA	Kristina Mladenovic	16	1
AUS	Anastasia Rodionova	AUS	Arina Rodionova	72	2
SRB	Jelena Janković	RUS	Anastasia Pavlyuchenkova	101	3
NED	Kiki Bertens	SWE	Johanna Larsson	149	4

- ^{1} Rankings are as of May 25, 2015.

=== Other entrants ===
The following pairs received wildcards into the doubles main draw:

- (Canada) Eugenie Bouchard / (Ukraine) Lesia Tsurenko
- (Netherlands) Indy de Vroome / (Netherlands) Lesley Kerkhove

=== Withdrawals ===
During the tournament

- (Hungary) Tímea Babos (viral illness)

== Champions ==
=== Men's singles ===
- (France) Nicolas Mahut def. (Belgium) David Goffin, 7–6^{(7–1)}, 6–1

=== Women's singles ===
- (Italy) Camila Giorgi def. (Switzerland) Belinda Bencic, 7–5, 6–3

=== Men's doubles ===
- (Croatia) Ivo Karlović / (Poland) Łukasz Kubot def. (France) Pierre-Hugues Herbert / (France) Nicolas Mahut, 6–2, 7–6^{(11–9)}

=== Women's doubles ===
- (United States) Asia Muhammad / (Germany) Laura Siegemund def. (Serbia) Jelena Janković / (Russia) Anastasia Pavlyuchenkova, 6–3, 7–5
