= 2012 UNICEF Open =

- Date: 17–23 June 2012
- Edition: 23rd
- Category: 250 Series (ATP); Internat. tournaments (WTA)
- Surface: Grass / outdoor
- Location: Rosmalen, 's-Hertogenbosch, Netherlands

Champions

Men's singles
- (Spain) David Ferrer

Women's singles
- (Russia) Nadia Petrova

Men's doubles
- (Sweden) Robert Lindstedt / (Romania) Horia Tecău

Women's doubles
- (Italy) Sara Errani / (Italy) Roberta Vinci
| ← 2011 · | UNICEF Open | · 2013 → |

The 2012 UNICEF Open was a tennis tournament played on outdoor grass courts. It was the 23rd edition of the UNICEF Open, and was part of the 250 Series of the 2012 ATP World Tour, and of the WTA International tournaments of the 2012 WTA Tour. Both the men's and the women's events took place at the Autotron park in Rosmalen, 's-Hertogenbosch, Netherlands, from 17 June until 23 June 2012. David Ferrer and Nadia Petrova won the singles titles.

== Finals ==
=== Men's singles ===
(Spain) David Ferrer defeated (Germany) Philipp Petzschner, 6–3, 6–4

=== Women's singles ===
(Russia) Nadia Petrova defeated (Poland) Urszula Radwańska, 6–4, 6–3

=== Men's doubles ===
(Sweden) Robert Lindstedt / (Romania) Horia Tecău defeated (Colombia) Juan Sebastián Cabal / (Russia) Dmitry Tursunov, 6–3, 7–6^{(7–1)}

=== Women's doubles ===
(Italy) Sara Errani / (Italy) Roberta Vinci defeated (Russia) Maria Kirilenko / (Russia) Nadia Petrova, 6–4, 3–6, [11–9]

== ATP singles main-draw entrants ==
=== Seeds ===
| Country | Player | Rank^{1} | Seed |
|---|---|---|---|
| ESP | David Ferrer | 6 | 1 |
| SRB | Viktor Troicki | 33 | 2 |
| AUT | Jürgen Melzer | 35 | 3 |
| NED | Robin Haase | 40 | 4 |
| COL | Santiago Giraldo | 44 | 5 |
| FIN | Jarkko Nieminen | 45 | 6 |
| RUS | Alex Bogomolov Jr. | 46 | 7 |
| POL | Łukasz Kubot | 50 | 8 |

- ^{1}Seedings are based on the rankings as of June 11, 2012

=== Other entrants ===
The following players received wildcards into the main draw:

- (Belgium) David Goffin
- (Croatia) Mate Pavić
- (Netherlands) Igor Sijsling

The following players received entry from the qualifying draw:

- (Canada) Pierre-Ludovic Duclos
- (Hungary) Márton Fucsovics
- (Russia) Mikhail Ledovskikh
- (Germany) Philipp Petzschner

=== Retirements ===
- (Tunisia) Malek Jaziri (illness)
- (Croatia) Mate Pavić
- (Italy) Potito Starace (low-back injury)

== ATP doubles main-draw entrants ==
=== Seeds ===
| Country | Player | Country | Player | Rank^{1} | Seed |
|---|---|---|---|---|---|
| SWE | Robert Lindstedt | ROU | Horia Tecău | 21 | 1 |
| PAK | Aisam-ul-Haq Qureshi | NED | Jean-Julien Rojer | 38 | 2 |
| CZE | František Čermák | SVK | Filip Polášek | 49 | 3 |
| USA | Scott Lipsky | IND | Leander Paes | 50 | 4 |

- Rankings are as of June 11, 2012

=== Other entrants ===
The following pairs received wildcards into the doubles main draw:

- (Sweden) Johan Brunström / (Germany) Philipp Marx

The following pair received entry as alternates:

- (Germany) Martin Emmrich / (Germany) Michael Kohlmann

=== Withdrawals ===
- (Italy) Potito Starace (low-back injury)

== WTA singles main-draw entrants ==
=== Seeds ===
| Country | Player | Rank^{1} | Seed |
|---|---|---|---|
| AUS | Samantha Stosur | 5 | 1 |
| ITA | Sara Errani | 10 | 2 |
| SVK | Dominika Cibulková | 12 | 3 |
| ITA | Flavia Pennetta | 17 | 4 |
| RUS | Maria Kirilenko | 19 | 5 |
| ITA | Roberta Vinci | 20 | 6 |
| SRB | Jelena Janković | 22 | 7 |
| RUS | Nadia Petrova | 23 | 8 |

- ^{1}Seedings are based on the rankings as of June 11, 2012

=== Other entrants ===
The following players received wildcards into the main draw:

- (Netherlands) Kiki Bertens
- (Serbia) Jelena Janković
- (Netherlands) Arantxa Rus

The following players received entry from the qualifying draw:

- (Uzbekistan) Akgul Amanmuradova
- (Belgium) Kirsten Flipkens
- (Russia) Daria Gavrilova
- (Poland) Urszula Radwańska

=== Withdrawals ===
- (Netherlands) Michaëlla Krajicek (viral illness)

=== Retirements ===
- (Belgium) Kim Clijsters (abdominal injury)

== WTA doubles main-draw entrants ==
=== Seeds ===
| Country | Player | Country | Player | Rank^{1} | Seed |
|---|---|---|---|---|---|
| ITA | Sara Errani | ITA | Roberta Vinci | 7 | 1 |
| RUS | Maria Kirilenko | RUS | Nadia Petrova | 18 | 2 |
| ESP | Anabel Medina Garrigues | ESP | Arantxa Parra Santonja | 55 | 3 |
| ROU | Irina-Camelia Begu | ROU | Monica Niculescu | 67 | 4 |

- ^{1} Rankings are as of June 11, 2012

=== Other entrants ===
The following pairs received wildcards into the doubles main draw:

- (Netherlands) Kiki Bertens / (Netherlands) Arantxa Rus
- (Netherlands) Indy de Vroome / (Netherlands) Demi Schuurs

=== Retirements ===
- (Italy) Francesca Schiavone (thigh injury)
