= 2015 Topshelf Open – Women's singles =

Women's singles
- 2015 Topshelf Open

Final
- Champion: (Italy) Camila Giorgi
- Runner-up: (Switzerland) Belinda Bencic
- Score: 7–5, 6–3

Details
- Draw: 32 (4 Q / 3 WC )
- Seeds: 8

Events
Singles	men	women
Doubles	men	women
← 2014 ·	Topshelf Open	· 2016 →

Coco Vandeweghe was the defending champion, but lost in the quarterfinals to Kiki Bertens.

Fifth seed Camila Giorgi won her first WTA title, defeating Belinda Bencic in the final, 7–5 6–3.

== Seeds ==
1. (Canada) Eugenie Bouchard (first round)
2. (Serbia) Jelena Janković (semifinals)
3. (United States) Coco Vandeweghe (quarterfinals)
4. (Switzerland) Belinda Bencic (final)
5. (Italy) Camila Giorgi (champion)
6. (Russia) Anastasia Pavlyuchenkova (second round)
7. (France) Kristina Mladenovic (quarterfinals)
8. (Sweden) Johanna Larsson (first round)

== Draw ==
=== Key ===
- Q = Qualifier
- WC = Wild card
- LL = Lucky loser
- Alt = Alternate
- ITF = ITF entry
- PR = Protected ranking
- SR = Special ranking
- SE = Special exempt
- JE = Junior exempt
- JR = Junior Accelerator Programme entrant
- CO = College Accelerator Programme entrant
- NG = Next Gen Accelerator Program entrant
- w/o = Walkover
- r = Retired
- d = Defaulted

=== Finals ===
Semifinals
5	(Italy) Camila Giorgi	6	6
(Netherlands) Kiki Bertens	2	4
4	(Switzerland) Belinda Bencic	6	6
2	(Serbia) Jelena Janković	3	3

Final
5	(Italy) Camila Giorgi	7	6
4	(Switzerland) Belinda Bencic	5	3

=== Top half ===
First round
1/WC	(Canada) E Bouchard	4	6	4
(Kazakhstan) Y Shvedova	6	1	6
(New Zealand) M Erakovic	6	7^{7}
(Germany) C Witthöft	4	6^{5}
WC	(France) O Dodin	5	4
WC	(Netherlands) M Krajicek	7	6
(United States) I Falconi	5	2
5	(Italy) C Giorgi	7	6
3	(United States) C Vandeweghe	7^{7}	6
(Romania) A Mitu	6^{1}	1
(Germany) T Maria	6	6
(Czech Republic) K Siniaková	4	2
(China) S Zhang	6^{7}	1
(Netherlands) K Bertens	7^{9}	6
Q	(United States) M Sanchez	2	6^{4}
6	(Russia) A Pavlyuchenkova	6	7^{7}

Second round
(Kazakhstan) Y Shvedova	6	6
(New Zealand) M Erakovic	4	4
WC	(Netherlands) M Krajicek	7^{7}	2	4
5	(Italy) C Giorgi	6^{2}	6	6
3	(United States) C Vandeweghe	7	6
(Germany) T Maria	5	4
(Netherlands) K Bertens	6	6
6	(Russia) A Pavlyuchenkova	2	2

Quarterfinals
(Kazakhstan) Y Shvedova	6	3	6^{9}
5	(Italy) C Giorgi	4	6	7^{11}
3	(United States) C Vandeweghe	4	1
(Netherlands) K Bertens	6	6

Semifinals
5	(Italy) C Giorgi	6	6
(Netherlands) K Bertens	2	4

=== Bottom half ===
First round
7	(France) K Mladenovic	7^{7}	4	6
(Hungary) T Babos	6^{4}	6	2
(Japan) K Nara	1	7^{7}	6
(Belgium) K Flipkens	6	6^{4}	4
(Belgium) A Van Uytvanck	7	6
(Russia) E Rodina	5	3
Q	(United States) J Pegula	2	6^{3}
4	(Switzerland) B Bencic	6	7^{7}
8	(Sweden) J Larsson	4	1
(Czech Republic) K Koukalová	6	6
Q	(Poland) U Radwańska	2	4
(Germany) A Beck	6	6
Q	(Czech Republic) A Hlaváčková	6	2	6
(Ukraine) L Tsurenko	2	6	3
(Czech Republic) T Smitková	5	4
2	(Serbia) J Janković	7	6

Second round
7	(France) K Mladenovic	6^{4}	6	6
(Japan) K Nara	7^{7}	3	3
(Belgium) A Van Uytvanck	3	2
4	(Switzerland) B Bencic	6	6
(Czech Republic) K Koukalová	4	4
(Germany) A Beck	6	6
Q	(Czech Republic) A Hlaváčková	1	4
2	(Serbia) J Janković	6	6

Quarterfinals
7	(France) K Mladenovic	6^{4}	7^{7}	5
4	(Switzerland) B Bencic	7^{7}	6^{4}	7
(Germany) A Beck	4	1
2	(Serbia) J Janković	6	6

Semifinals
4	(Switzerland) B Bencic	6	6
2	(Serbia) J Janković	3	3

== Qualifying ==
=== Seeds ===
1. (Germany) Anna-Lena Friedsam (first round)
2. (Poland) Urszula Radwańska (qualified)
3. (Belgium) An-Sophie Mestach (first round)
4. (Russia) Elizaveta Kulichkova (second round)
5. (Israel) Julia Glushko (first round)
6. (Netherlands) Richèl Hogenkamp (qualifying competition)
7. (Latvia) Jeļena Ostapenko (qualifying competition)
8. (Japan) Eri Hozumi (first round)

=== Qualifiers ===
1. (United States) Jessica Pegula
2. (Poland) Urszula Radwańska
3. (Czech Republic) Andrea Hlaváčková
4. (United States) Maria Sanchez

=== Draw ===
==== First qualifier ====
First round
1	(Germany) Anna-Lena Friedsam	1	6	4
(United States) Jessica Pegula	6	4	6
(Romania) Ana Bogdan	6	6
WC	(Netherlands) Mandy Wagemaker	3	4
(Belgium) Ysaline Bonaventure	6	6
(Czech Republic) Petra Krejsová	4	3
(United States) Caitlin Whoriskey	0	2
7	(Latvia) Jeļena Ostapenko	6	6

Second round
(United States) Jessica Pegula	6	2	6
(Romania) Ana Bogdan	3	6	4
(Belgium) Ysaline Bonaventure	4	6	2
7	(Latvia) Jeļena Ostapenko	6	4	6

Qualifying competition
(United States) Jessica Pegula	4	7	6
7	(Latvia) Jeļena Ostapenko	6	5	4

==== Second qualifier ====
First round
2	(Poland) Urszula Radwańska	6	6
(Russia) Marina Melnikova	0	3
(Brazil) Paula Cristina Gonçalves	6	6
WC	(Greece) Eleni Daniilidou	3	3
(United States) Alexa Glatch	4	4
(Australia) Arina Rodionova	6	6
(Australia) Anastasia Rodionova	6	6
8	(Japan) Eri Hozumi	4	1

Second round
2	(Poland) Urszula Radwańska	6	6
(Brazil) Paula Cristina Gonçalves	2	3
(Australia) Arina Rodionova	6	6
(Australia) Anastasia Rodionova	4	1

Qualifying competition
2	(Poland) Urszula Radwańska	3	7^{8}	6
(Australia) Arina Rodionova	6	6^{6}	0

==== Third qualifier ====
First round
3	(Belgium) An-Sophie Mestach	4	6	6^{2}
(Czech Republic) Andrea Hlaváčková	6	1	7^{7}
(Belgium) Elise Mertens	2	4
(United States) Julia Boserup	6	6
(Netherlands) Lesley Kerkhove	6	7
(Spain) Laura Pous Tió	2	5
(Netherlands) Indy de Vroome	6	6
5/WC	(Israel) Julia Glushko	2	3

Second round
(Czech Republic) Andrea Hlaváčková	2	6	7
(United States) Julia Boserup	6	3	5
(Netherlands) Lesley Kerkhove	7^{7}	3	6
(Netherlands) Indy de Vroome	6^{4}	6	3

Qualifying competition
(Czech Republic) Andrea Hlaváčková	6	6
(Netherlands) Lesley Kerkhove	1	0

==== Fourth qualifier ====
First round
4	(Russia) Elizaveta Kulichkova	6	6
(Japan) Junri Namigata	3	4
(Czech Republic) Tereza Martincová	4	6^{4}
(United States) Maria Sanchez	6	7^{7}
WC	(Netherlands) Demi Schuurs	6	6
(Bulgaria) Elitsa Kostova	3	2
(Romania) Elena Bogdan	3	1
6	(Netherlands) Richèl Hogenkamp	6	6

Second round
4	(Russia) Elizaveta Kulichkova	6^{1}	6	6^{5}
(United States) Maria Sanchez	7^{7}	4	7^{7}
WC	(Netherlands) Demi Schuurs	1	4
6	(Netherlands) Richèl Hogenkamp	6	6

Qualifying competition
(United States) Maria Sanchez	7^{7}	6
6	(Netherlands) Richèl Hogenkamp	6^{2}	3
