= 2014 Topshelf Open – Men's doubles =

Men's doubles
- 2014 Topshelf Open

Final
- Champions: (Netherlands) Jean-Julien Rojer (Romania) Horia Tecău
- Runners-up: (Mexico) Santiago González (United States) Scott Lipsky
- Score: 6–3, 7–6^{(7–3)}

Events
Singles	men	women
Doubles	men	women
← 2013 ·	Topshelf Open	· 2015 →

Max Mirnyi and Horia Tecău were the defending champions, but Mirnyi chose not to participate. Tecău played alongside Jean-Julien Rojer and successfully defended the title, defeating Santiago González and Scott Lipsky in the final, 6–3, 7–6^{(7–3)}.

== Seeds ==
1. (Netherlands) Jean-Julien Rojer / (Romania) Horia Tecău (champions)
2. (United States) Eric Butorac / (South Africa) Raven Klaasen (semifinals)
3. (Spain) Marcel Granollers / (Austria) Jürgen Melzer (semifinals)
4. (Mexico) Santiago González / (United States) Scott Lipsky (final)

== Draw ==
=== Key ===
- Q = Qualifier
- WC = Wild card
- LL = Lucky loser
- Alt = Alternate
- SE = Special exempt
- PR = Protected ranking
- ITF = ITF entry
- JE = Junior exempt
- w/o = Walkover
- r = Retired
- d = Defaulted
- SR = Special ranking

=== Draw ===
First round
1	(Netherlands) J-J Rojer (Romania) H Tecău	6	7
(Spain) R Bautista Agut (Brazil) A Sá	3	5
(Croatia) M Draganja (Romania) F Mergea	6	6
(Sweden) J Brunström (Germany) M Emmrich	2	4
3	(Spain) M Granollers (Austria) J Melzer	6	6
(United States) N Monroe (Canada) V Pospisil	4	3
(Germany) A Begemann (Czech Republic) L Rosol	6^{4}	6	[10]
(Australia) M Ebden (Russia) D Tursunov	7^{7}	2	[8]
(Poland) T Bednarek (Czech Republic) L Dlouhý	7^{7}	6
WC	(Germany) D Brown (Finland) H Kontinen	6^{4}	4
Alt	(Portugal) J Sousa (Germany) J-L Struff	4	6^{3}
4	(Mexico) S González (United States) S Lipsky	6	7^{7}
(Germany) B Becker (Austria) O Marach	7	6
Alt	(Netherlands) S Fransen (Netherlands) W Koolhof	5	3
(Italy) D Bracciali (Croatia) M Pavić	7^{7}	2	[4]
2	(United States) E Butorac (South Africa) R Klaasen	6^{4}	6	[10]

Quarterfinals
1	(Netherlands) J-J Rojer (Romania) H Tecău	6	6
(Croatia) M Draganja (Romania) F Mergea	3	4
3	(Spain) M Granollers (Austria) J Melzer	6	6
(Germany) A Begemann (Czech Republic) L Rosol	3	4
(Poland) T Bednarek (Czech Republic) L Dlouhý	4	6^{8}
4	(Mexico) S González (United States) S Lipsky	6	7^{10}
(Germany) B Becker (Austria) O Marach	6^{2}	2
2	(United States) E Butorac (South Africa) R Klaasen	7^{7}	6

Semifinals
1	(Netherlands) J-J Rojer (Romania) H Tecău	7^{7}	3	[10]
3	(Spain) M Granollers (Austria) J Melzer	6^{4}	6	[6]
4	(Mexico) S González (United States) S Lipsky	6	6
2	(United States) E Butorac (South Africa) R Klaasen	4	2

Final
1	(Netherlands) J-J Rojer (Romania) H Tecău	6	7^{7}
4	(Mexico) S González (United States) S Lipsky	3	6^{3}
