= 2014 Topshelf Open – Women's doubles =

Women's doubles
- 2014 Topshelf Open

Final
- Champions: (New Zealand) Marina Erakovic (Spain) Arantxa Parra Santonja
- Runners-up: (Netherlands) Michaëlla Krajicek (France) Kristina Mladenovic
- Score: 0–6, 7–6^{(7–5)}, [10–8]

Details
- Draw: 16
- Seeds: 4

Events
Singles	men	women
Doubles	men	women
← 2013 ·	Topshelf Open	· 2015 →

Irina-Camelia Begu and Anabel Medina Garrigues were the defending champions, but chose not to participate together. Begu played alongside Vania King, but lost in the first round to Michaëlla Krajicek and Kristina Mladenovic. Medina Garrigues teamed up with Yaroslava Shvedova, but lost in the semifinals to Krajicek and Mladenovic.
Marina Erakovic and Arantxa Parra Santonja won the title, defeating Krajicek and Mladenovic in the final, 0–6, 7–6^{(7–5)}, [10–8].

== Seeds ==
1. (Czech Republic) Andrea Hlaváčková / (China) Zheng Jie (semifinals)
2. (Spain) Anabel Medina Garrigues / (Kazakhstan) Yaroslava Shvedova (semifinals)
3. (Netherlands) Michaëlla Krajicek / (France) Kristina Mladenovic (final)
4. (New Zealand) Marina Erakovic / (Spain) Arantxa Parra Santonja (champions)

== Draw ==
=== Key ===
- Q = Qualifier
- WC = Wild card
- LL = Lucky loser
- Alt = Alternate
- ITF = ITF entry
- PR = Protected ranking
- SR = Special ranking
- SE = Special exempt
- JE = Junior exempt
- JR = Junior Accelerator Programme entrant
- CO = College Accelerator Programme entrant
- NG = Next Gen Accelerator Program entrant
- w/o = Walkover
- r = Retired
- d = Defaulted

=== Draw ===
First round
1	(Czech Republic) A Hlaváčková (China) J Zheng	6	6^{3}	[10]
(Israel) J Glushko (Austria) S Klemenschits	3	7^{7}	[7]
(Greece) E Daniilidou (Czech Republic) E Hrdinová	6	6
(United States) N Melichar (United Kingdom) N Slater	4	4
4	(New Zealand) M Erakovic (Spain) A Parra Santonja	6	6
(Romania) R Olaru (Israel) S Pe'er	3	2
(Russia) M Kirilenko (Belgium) Y Wickmayer	6	6
(Ukraine) A Fomina (Germany) C Shakovets	0	0
(Germany) A Beck (Japan) K Nara	6^{6}	6	[4]
(Slovenia) A Klepač (Spain) MT Torró Flor	7^{8}	2	[10]
(Romania) I-C Begu (United States) V King	6	3	[8]
3	(Netherlands) M Krajicek (France) K Mladenovic	3	6	[10]
WC	(Netherlands) D Schuurs (Belgium) A Van Uytvanck	0	6	[8]
(Croatia) D Jurak (United States) M Moulton-Levy	6	3	[10]
(Slovakia) D Cibulková (Spain) L Domínguez Lino	4	7^{7}	[6]
2	(Spain) A Medina Garrigues (Kazakhstan) Y Shvedova	6	6^{4}	[10]

Quarterfinals
1	(Czech Republic) A Hlaváčková (China) J Zheng	6	6
(Greece) E Daniilidou (Czech Republic) E Hrdinová	2	3
4	(New Zealand) M Erakovic (Spain) A Parra Santonja	6	6
(Russia) M Kirilenko (Belgium) Y Wickmayer	3	0
(Slovenia) A Klepač (Spain) MT Torró Flor	4	4
3	(Netherlands) M Krajicek (France) K Mladenovic	6	6
(Croatia) D Jurak (United States) M Moulton-Levy	3	4
2	(Spain) A Medina Garrigues (Kazakhstan) Y Shvedova	6	6

Semifinals
1	(Czech Republic) A Hlaváčková (China) J Zheng	3	5
4	(New Zealand) M Erakovic (Spain) A Parra Santonja	6	7
3	(Netherlands) M Krajicek (France) K Mladenovic	7^{7}	6
2	(Spain) A Medina Garrigues (Kazakhstan) Y Shvedova	6^{1}	4

Final
4	(New Zealand) M Erakovic (Spain) A Parra Santonja	0	7^{7}	[10]
3	(Netherlands) M Krajicek (France) K Mladenovic	6	6^{5}	[8]
