= 2015 Topshelf Open – Women's doubles =

Women's doubles
- 2015 Topshelf Open

Final
- Champions: (United States) Asia Muhammad (Germany) Laura Siegemund
- Runners-up: (Serbia) Jelena Janković (Russia) Anastasia Pavlyuchenkova
- Score: 6–3, 7–5

Details
- Draw: 16
- Seeds: 4

Events
Singles	men	women
Doubles	men	women
← 2014 ·	Topshelf Open	· 2016 →

Marina Erakovic and Arantxa Parra Santonja were the defending champions, but chose not to participate this year.
Asia Muhammad and Laura Siegemund won the title, defeating Jelena Janković and Anastasia Pavlyuchenkova in the final, 6–3, 7–5.

== Seeds ==
1. (Hungary) Tímea Babos / (France) Kristina Mladenovic (semifinals, withdrew)
2. (Australia) Anastasia Rodionova / (Australia) Arina Rodionova (semifinals)
3. (Serbia) Jelena Janković / (Russia) Anastasia Pavlyuchenkova (final)
4. (Netherlands) Kiki Bertens / (Sweden) Johanna Larsson (quarterfinals)

== Draw ==
=== Key ===
- Q = Qualifier
- WC = Wild card
- LL = Lucky loser
- Alt = Alternate
- ITF = ITF entry
- PR = Protected ranking
- SR = Special ranking
- SE = Special exempt
- JE = Junior exempt
- JR = Junior Accelerator Programme entrant
- CO = College Accelerator Programme entrant
- NG = Next Gen Accelerator Program entrant
- w/o = Walkover
- r = Retired
- d = Defaulted

First round
1	(Hungary) T Babos (France) K Mladenovic	1	6	[11]
WC	(Canada) E Bouchard (Ukraine) L Tsurenko	6	2	[9]
(Belgium) Y Bonaventure (Netherlands) D Schuurs	4	7^{8}	[10]
(Switzerland) B Bencic (Czech Republic) K Siniaková	6	6^{6}	[8]
3	(Serbia) J Janković (Russia) A Pavlyuchenkova	6	6
(Austria) S Klemenschits (Germany) T Maria	3	0
(Netherlands) M Krajicek (United States) C Vandeweghe	2	2
(Georgia (country)) O Kalashnikova (Russia) E Rodina	6	6
(United States) A Muhammad (Germany) L Siegemund	6	6
(Brazil) PC Gonçalves (United States) N Melichar	2	4
(Romania) E Bogdan (Czech Republic) E Hrdinová	4	6	[7]
4	(Netherlands) K Bertens (Sweden) J Larsson	6	2	[10]
(Japan) E Hozumi (Japan) J Namigata	2	4
(United States) I Falconi (United States) M Sanchez	6	6
WC	(Netherlands) I de Vroome (Netherlands) L Kerkhove	6^{3}	6	[4]
2	(Australia) An Rodionova (Australia) Ar Rodionova	7^{7}	1	[10]

Quarterfinals
1	(Hungary) T Babos (France) K Mladenovic	6	6
(Belgium) Y Bonaventure (Netherlands) D Schuurs	3	3
3	(Serbia) J Janković (Russia) A Pavlyuchenkova	6	6
(Georgia (country)) O Kalashnikova (Russia) E Rodina	4	4
(United States) A Muhammad (Germany) L Siegemund	6	3	[10]
4	(Netherlands) K Bertens (Sweden) J Larsson	2	6	[7]
(United States) I Falconi (United States) M Sanchez	6	5	[7]
2	(Australia) An Rodionova (Australia) Ar Rodionova	2	7	[10]

Semifinals
1	(Hungary) T Babos (France) K Mladenovic
3	(Serbia) J Janković (Russia) A Pavlyuchenkova	w/o
(United States) A Muhammad (Germany) L Siegemund	4	7	[10]
2	(Australia) An Rodionova (Australia) Ar Rodionova	6	5	[8]

Final
3	(Serbia) J Janković (Russia) A Pavlyuchenkova	3	5
(United States) A Muhammad (Germany) L Siegemund	6	7
