= 2015 Topshelf Open – Men's singles =

Men's singles
- 2015 Topshelf Open

Final
- Champion: (France) Nicolas Mahut
- Runner-up: (Belgium) David Goffin
- Score: 7–6^{(7–1)}, 6–1

Details
- Draw: 28 (4 Q / 3 WC )
- Seeds: 8

Events
Singles	men	women
Doubles	men	women
← 2014 ·	Topshelf Open	· 2016 →

Roberto Bautista Agut was the defending champion, but lost in the second round to Nicolas Mahut.

Mahut went on to win his second title at 's-Hertogenbosch, defeating David Goffin in the final, 7–6^{(7–1)}, 6–1

== Seeds ==
The top four seeds receive a bye into the second round.

1. (France) Jo-Wilfried Tsonga (withdrew)
2. (Belgium) David Goffin (final)
3. (Spain) Roberto Bautista Agut (second round)
4. (Spain) Guillermo García López (second round)
5. (Croatia) Ivo Karlović (quarterfinals)
6. (France) Adrian Mannarino (quarterfinals)
7. (Spain) Fernando Verdasco (second round)
8. (Portugal) João Sousa (second round)
9. (Canada) Vasek Pospisil (second round)

== Draw ==
=== Key ===
- Q = Qualifier
- WC = Wild card
- LL = Lucky loser
- Alt = Alternate
- ITF = ITF entry
- PR = Protected ranking
- SR = Special ranking
- SE = Special exempt
- JE = Junior exempt
- JR = Junior Accelerator Programme entrant
- CO = College Accelerator Programme entrant
- NG = Next Gen Accelerator Program entrant
- w/o = Walkover
- r = Retired
- d = Defaulted

=== Finals ===
Semifinals
WC	(Netherlands) Robin Haase	7	3	4
Q	(France) Nicolas Mahut	5	6	6
(Luxembourg) Gilles Müller	6^{4}	4
2	(Belgium) David Goffin	7^{7}	6

Final
Q	(France) Nicolas Mahut	7^{7}	6
2	(Belgium) David Goffin	6^{1}	1

=== Top half ===
First round
(Lithuania) R Berankis	3	6^{4}
Q	(Japan) T Ito	6	7^{7}
(Slovenia) B Kavčič	2	5
WC	(Netherlands) R Haase	6	7
(Spain) D Gimeno Traver	6^{3}	7^{8}	2
7	(Spain) F Verdasco	7^{7}	6^{6}	6
WC	(Australia) L Hewitt	3	4
Q	(France) N Mahut	6	6
Q	(Switzerland) M Chiudinelli	7^{7}	2	7^{7}
(France) B Paire	6^{3}	6	6^{4}
(Chinese Taipei) Y-h Lu	4	3
6	(France) A Mannarino	6	6

Second round
5	(Croatia) I Karlović	7^{7}	7^{7}
Q	(Japan) T Ito	6^{5}	6^{3}
WC	(Netherlands) R Haase	7^{7}	6
7	(Spain) F Verdasco	6^{4}	3
3	(Spain) R Bautista Agut	2	4
Q	(France) N Mahut	6	6
Q	(Switzerland) M Chiudinelli	3	2
6	(France) A Mannarino	6	6

Quarterfinals
5	(Croatia) I Karlović	7^{7}	4	6^{3}
WC	(Netherlands) R Haase	6^{4}	6	7^{7}
Q	(France) N Mahut	6	6
6	(France) A Mannarino	1	3

Semifinals
WC	(Netherlands) R Haase	7	3	4
Q	(France) N Mahut	5	6	6

=== Bottom half ===
First round
9	(Canada) V Pospisil	6	6
(Australia) M Matosevic	3	2
(Turkey) M İlhan	0	5
(Luxembourg) G Müller	6	7
WC	(Romania) M Copil	6	2	6
(Finland) J Nieminen	3	6	4
8	(Portugal) J Sousa	6	0	6
(Uzbekistan) D Istomin	2	6	2
Q	(Ukraine) I Marchenko	6	6
(Russia) M Youzhny	4	4
(Austria) J Melzer	6	6^{5}	6
LL	(France) K de Schepper	4	7^{7}	3

Second round
9	(Canada) V Pospisil	4	6	6^{6}
(Luxembourg) G Müller	6	4	7^{8}
WC	(Romania) M Copil	7^{7}	6
4	(Spain) G García López	6^{5}	4
8	(Portugal) J Sousa	3	6^{2}
Q	(Ukraine) I Marchenko	6	7^{7}
(Austria) J Melzer	6^{2}	2
2	(Belgium) D Goffin	7^{7}	6

Quarterfinals
(Luxembourg) G Müller	7^{7}	6
WC	(Romania) M Copil	6^{4}	1
Q	(Ukraine) I Marchenko	6	6^{3}	2
2	(Belgium) D Goffin	4	7^{7}	6

Semifinals
(Luxembourg) G Müller	6^{4}	4
2	(Belgium) D Goffin	7^{7}	6

== Qualifying ==
=== Seeds ===
1. (South Korea) Chung Hyeon (first round)
2. (France) Lucas Pouille (first round)
3. (Belgium) Ruben Bemelmans (second round)
4. (Japan) Tatsuma Ito (qualified)
5. (Spain) Adrián Menéndez Maceiras (first round)
6. (France) Nicolas Mahut (qualified)
7. (United States) Austin Krajicek (first round)
8. (France) Paul-Henri Mathieu (second round)

=== Qualifiers ===
1. (Ukraine) Illya Marchenko
2. (Switzerland) Marco Chiudinelli
3. (France) Nicolas Mahut
4. (Japan) Tatsuma Ito

=== Lucky loser ===
1. (France) Kenny de Schepper

=== Qualifying draw ===
==== First qualifier ====
First round
1	(South Korea) Chung Hyeon	6^{3}	4
(United States) Nicholas Monroe	7^{7}	6
WC	(Netherlands) Max de Vroome	4	2
(Pakistan) Aisam-ul-Haq Qureshi	6	6
(United States) Greg Ouellette	3	7	3
(Brazil) Henrique Cunha	6	5	6
(Ukraine) Illya Marchenko	6^{7}	6	6
5	(Spain) Adrián Menéndez Maceiras	7^{9}	4	4

Second round
(United States) Nicholas Monroe	4	7	1
(Pakistan) Aisam-ul-Haq Qureshi	6	5	6
(Brazil) Henrique Cunha	6^{3}	4
(Ukraine) Illya Marchenko	7^{7}	6

Qualifying competition
(Pakistan) Aisam-ul-Haq Qureshi	4	7^{8}	5
(Ukraine) Illya Marchenko	6	6^{6}	7

==== Second qualifier ====
First round
2	(France) Lucas Pouille	2	2
(Switzerland) Marco Chiudinelli	6	6
(Germany) Alexander Mannapov	4	4
WC	(Netherlands) Thiemo de Bakker	6	6
(United States) Alex Kuznetsov	6^{7}	6	5
(France) Pierre-Hugues Herbert	7^{9}	4	7
(Netherlands) Thomas Schoorel	6	3	6
7	(United States) Austin Krajicek	2	6	3

Second round
(Switzerland) Marco Chiudinelli	3	6	6
WC	(Netherlands) Thiemo de Bakker	6	4	4
(France) Pierre-Hugues Herbert	6	6
(Netherlands) Thomas Schoorel	3	4

Qualifying competition
(Switzerland) Marco Chiudinelli	1	6	6
(France) Pierre-Hugues Herbert	6	4	1

==== Third qualifier ====
First round
3	(Belgium) Ruben Bemelmans	6	7^{7}
(Netherlands) Boy Westerhof	2	6^{4}
(France) Kenny de Schepper	6	6
(Chile) Nicolás Jarry	3	2
(New Zealand) Artem Sitak	3	4
(Estonia) Jürgen Zopp	6	6
(Austria) Oliver Marach	3	4
6	(France) Nicolas Mahut	6	6

Second round
3	(Belgium) Ruben Bemelmans	4	3
(France) Kenny de Schepper	6	6
(Estonia) Jürgen Zopp	2	4
6	(France) Nicolas Mahut	6	6

Qualifying competition
(France) Kenny de Schepper	6	4	3
6	(France) Nicolas Mahut	4	6	6

==== Fourth qualifier ====
First round
4	(Japan) Tatsuma Ito	6	6
WC	(Netherlands) Jelle Sels	1	2
(Australia) Matt Reid	6	6
(Germany) Tom Schonenberg	4	4
(Australia) Jordan Thompson	4	4
(Czech Republic) Jan Hernych	6	6
(New Zealand) Sebastian Lavie	4	1
8	(France) Paul-Henri Mathieu	6	6

Second round
4	(Japan) Tatsuma Ito	6	7^{7}
(Australia) Matt Reid	1	6^{1}
(Czech Republic) Jan Hernych	3	6	6
8	(France) Paul-Henri Mathieu	6	3	4

Qualifying competition
4	(Japan) Tatsuma Ito	6	6
(Czech Republic) Jan Hernych	4	4
