= 2012 UNICEF Open – Women's doubles =

Women's doubles
- 2012 UNICEF Open

Final
- Champions: (Italy) Sara Errani (Italy) Roberta Vinci
- Runners-up: (Russia) Maria Kirilenko (Russia) Nadia Petrova
- Score: 6–4, 3–6, [11–9]

Details
- Draw: 16
- Seeds: 4

Events
| Singles | men | women |
| Doubles | men | women |
| ← 2011 · | UNICEF Open | · 2013 → |

Barbora Záhlavová-Strýcová and Klára Zakopalová were the defending champions but Zakopalová decided not to participate.
Záhlavová-Strýcová played alongside Dominika Cibulková but were eliminated in the Quarterfinals.
Sara Errani and Roberta Vinci won the title by beating Maria Kirilenko and Nadia Petrova 6–4, 3–6, [11–9] in the final.

== Seeds ==
1. (Italy) Sara Errani / (Italy) Roberta Vinci (champions)
2. (Russia) Maria Kirilenko / (Russia) Nadia Petrova (final)
3. (Spain) Anabel Medina Garrigues / (Spain) Arantxa Parra Santonja (quarterfinals)
4. (Romania) Irina-Camelia Begu / (Romania) Monica Niculescu (quarterfinals)

== Draw ==
=== Key ===
- Q = Qualifier
- WC = Wild card
- LL = Lucky loser
- Alt = Alternate
- ITF = ITF entry
- PR = Protected ranking
- SR = Special ranking
- SE = Special exempt
- JE = Junior exempt
- JR = Junior Accelerator Programme entrant
- CO = College Accelerator Programme entrant
- NG = Next Gen Accelerator Program entrant
- w/o = Walkover
- r = Retired
- d = Defaulted

=== Draw ===
First round
1 | (Italy) S Errani (Italy) R Vinci | 6 | 6
(Greece) E Daniilidou (Japan) R Fujiwara | 1 | 2
WC | (Netherlands) I de Vroome (Netherlands) D Schuurs | 2 | 6 | [5]
(Slovenia) A Klepač (Australia) A Rodionova | 6 | 2 | [10]
3 | (Spain) A Medina Garrigues (Spain) A Parra Santonja | 7^{7} | 6
(Uzbekistan) A Amanmuradova (Russia) N Bratchikova | 6^{1} | 0
(Romania) A Cadanțu (Latvia) L Dekmeijere | 4 | 4
(Slovakia) D Cibulková (Czech Republic) B Záhlavová-Strýcová | 6 | 6
(Italy) F Pennetta (Italy) F Schiavone | 7^{7} | 7
WC | (Netherlands) K Bertens (Netherlands) A Rus | 6^{2} | 5
(Ukraine) K Bondarenko (Israel) S Pe'er | 3 | 3
4 | (Romania) I-C Begu (Romania) M Niculescu | 6 | 6
(Australia) S Bengson (Australia) D Jeflea | 0 | 6 | [6]
(Belarus) O Govortsova (Luxembourg) M Minella | 6 | 3 | [10]
(France) A Cornet (France) P Parmentier | 2 | 0
2 | (Russia) M Kirilenko (Russia) N Petrova | 6 | 6

Quarterfinals
1 | (Italy) S Errani (Italy) R Vinci | 6 | 6
(Slovenia) A Klepač (Australia) A Rodionova | 2 | 4
3 | (Spain) A Medina Garrigues (Spain) A Parra Santonja | 3 | 7 | [8]
(Slovakia) D Cibulková (Czech Republic) B Záhlavová-Strýcová | 6 | 5 | [10]
(Italy) F Pennetta (Italy) F Schiavone | 6 | 5 | [10]
4 | (Romania) I-C Begu (Romania) M Niculescu | 4 | 7 | [3]
(Belarus) O Govortsova (Luxembourg) M Minella | 5 | 1
2 | (Russia) M Kirilenko (Russia) N Petrova | 7 | 6

Semifinals
1 | (Italy) S Errani (Italy) R Vinci | 3 | 6 | [10]
(Slovakia) D Cibulková (Czech Republic) B Záhlavová-Strýcová | 6 | 3 | [6]
(Italy) F Pennetta (Italy) F Schiavone
2 | (Russia) M Kirilenko (Russia) N Petrova | w/o

Final
1 | (Italy) S Errani (Italy) R Vinci | 6 | 3 | [11]
2 | (Russia) M Kirilenko (Russia) N Petrova | 4 | 6 | [9]
