= 2014 Topshelf Open – Men's singles =

Men's singles
- 2014 Topshelf Open

Final
- Champion: (Spain) Roberto Bautista Agut
- Runner-up: (Germany) Benjamin Becker
- Score: 2–6, 7–6^{(7–2)}, 6–4

Details
- Draw: 32 (4 Q / 3 WC )
- Seeds: 8

Events
Singles	men	women
Doubles	men	women
← 2013 ·	Topshelf Open	· 2015 →

Nicolas Mahut was the defending champion, but lost in the quarterfinals to Roberto Bautista Agut.
Bautista Agut went on to win the title, defeating Benjamin Becker in the final, 2–6, 7–6^{(7–2)}, 6–4.

== Seeds ==
1. (Spain) David Ferrer (withdrew)
2. (Spain) Fernando Verdasco (quarterfinals)
3. (Spain) Roberto Bautista Agut (champion)
4. (Spain) Marcel Granollers (first round)
5. (Russia) Dmitry Tursunov (second round, withdrew with a foot injury)
6. (Canada) Vasek Pospisil (quarterfinals)
7. (France) Nicolas Mahut (quarterfinals)
8. (Austria) Jürgen Melzer (semifinals)

== Draw ==
=== Key ===
- Q = Qualifier
- WC = Wild card
- LL = Lucky loser
- Alt = Alternate
- SE = Special exempt
- PR = Protected ranking
- ITF = ITF entry
- JE = Junior exempt
- w/o = Walkover
- r = Retired
- d = Defaulted
- SR = Special ranking

=== Finals ===
Semifinals
Q	(Portugal) João Sousa	3	6^{3}
(Germany) Benjamin Becker	6	7^{7}
3	(Spain) Roberto Bautista Agut	4	6	7^{7}
8	(Austria) Jürgen Melzer	6	2	6^{4}

Final
(Germany) Benjamin Becker	6	6^{2}	4
3	(Spain) Roberto Bautista Agut	2	7^{7}	6

=== Top half ===
First round
LL	(Italy) P Lorenzi	3	6	3
Q	(Portugal) J Sousa	6	3	6
Q	(Croatia) M Pavić	7^{7}	6
(Colombia) A González	6^{4}	3
(Netherlands) I Sijsling	4	6^{4}
WC	(Netherlands) T de Bakker	6	7^{7}
(United States) B Klahn	3	6^{3}
5	(Russia) D Tursunov	6	7^{7}
4	(Spain) M Granollers	6	3	4
(Germany) B Becker	4	6	6
(Israel) D Sela	6	7^{7}
(France) B Paire	4	6^{2}
(Czech Republic) L Rosol	4	2
(Germany) J-L Struff	6	6
(Serbia) D Lajović	4	5
6	(Canada) V Pospisil	6	7

Second round
Q	(Portugal) J Sousa	6	6
Q	(Croatia) M Pavić	2	4
WC	(Netherlands) T de Bakker	w/o
5	(Russia) D Tursunov
(Germany) B Becker	6	7
(Israel) D Sela	2	5
(Germany) J-L Struff	4	2
6	(Canada) V Pospisil	6	6

Quarterfinals
Q	(Portugal) J Sousa	6	6
WC	(Netherlands) T de Bakker	4	2
(Germany) B Becker	6^{3}	7^{7}	6
6	(Canada) V Pospisil	7^{7}	6^{5}	4

Semifinals
Q	(Portugal) J Sousa	3	6^{3}
(Germany) B Becker	6	7^{7}

=== Bottom half ===
First round
7	(France) N Mahut	6	3	6
WC	(Belgium) K Coppejans	3	6	3
(France) K de Schepper	6^{3}	5
(United States) S Johnson	7^{7}	7
(Australia) M Ebden	6	4	6
Q	(France) A Mannarino	3	6	3
(Spain) D Gimeno Traver	1	3
3	(Spain) R Bautista Agut	6	6
8	(Austria) J Melzer	6	6
(Colombia) A Falla	4	3
Q	(Slovakia) L Lacko	6	6
(Romania) V Hănescu	3	4
(Kazakhstan) A Nedovyesov	2	0^{r}
WC	(Netherlands) J Huta Galung	6	1
(France) P-H Mathieu	6	4	4
2	(Spain) F Verdasco	2	6	6

Second round
7	(France) N Mahut	6	7^{7}
(United States) S Johnson	2	6^{4}
(Australia) M Ebden	5	6^{1}
3	(Spain) R Bautista Agut	7	7^{7}
8	(Austria) J Melzer	5	6	6
Q	(Slovakia) L Lacko	7	3	3
WC	(Netherlands) J Huta Galung	5	3
2	(Spain) F Verdasco	7	6

Quarterfinals
7	(France) N Mahut	3	6	3
3	(Spain) R Bautista Agut	6	4	6
8	(Austria) J Melzer	7^{7}	6^{6}	7^{11}
2	(Spain) F Verdasco	6^{3}	7^{8}	6^{9}

Semifinals
3	(Spain) R Bautista Agut	4	6	7^{7}
8	(Austria) J Melzer	6	2	6^{4}

== Qualifying ==
=== Seeds ===
1. (Portugal) João Sousa (qualified)
2. (Italy) Paolo Lorenzi (qualifying competition, Lucky loser)
3. (France) Adrian Mannarino (qualified)
4. (Slovakia) Lukáš Lacko (qualified)
5. (Germany) Julian Reister (qualifying competition)
6. (Ukraine) Sergiy Stakhovsky (second round)
7. (Russia) Evgeny Donskoy (first round)
8. (Estonia) Jürgen Zopp (qualifying competition)

=== Qualifiers ===
1. (Portugal) João Sousa
2. (Croatia) Mate Pavić
3. (France) Adrian Mannarino
4. (Slovakia) Lukáš Lacko

=== Lucky loser ===
1. (Italy) Paolo Lorenzi

=== Qualifying draw ===
==== First qualifier ====
First round				Second round				Qualifying competition
				1	(Portugal) João Sousa	7^{9}	6
(Germany) Kevin Krawietz	6	6			(Germany) Kevin Krawietz	6^{7}	3
(Germany) Maximilian Dinslaken	4	4						1	(Portugal) João Sousa	6	6
(Germany) Philipp Petzschner	3	7	6					5	(Germany) Julian Reister	1	1
(Germany) Martin Emmrich	6	5	3		(Germany) Philipp Petzschner	4	2^{r}
				5	(Germany) Julian Reister	6	4

==== Second qualifier ====
First round
(Belgium) Olivier Rochus	6	6
(Netherlands) Stephan Fransen	1	3
(Croatia) Mate Pavić	1	6	7^{7}
(Belgium) Steve Darcis	6	4	6^{5}
(New Zealand) Sebastian Lavie	0	4
6	(Ukraine) Sergiy Stakhovsky	6	6

Second round
2	(Italy) Paolo Lorenzi	6	2	6
(Belgium) Olivier Rochus	4	6	3
(Croatia) Mate Pavić	3	7^{7}	6
6	(Ukraine) Sergiy Stakhovsky	6	6^{2}	4

Qualifying competition
2	(Italy) Paolo Lorenzi	2	6	6^{6}
(Croatia) Mate Pavić	6	3	7^{8}

==== Third qualifier ====
First round
(Italy) Enrico Becuzzi	0	1
WC	(United States) Michael Grant	6	6
(Switzerland) Adrien Bossel	7^{8}	6
(Netherlands) Sander Groen	6^{6}	4
(Germany) Mats Moraing	2	1
8	(Estonia) Jürgen Zopp	6	6

Second round
3	(France) Adrian Mannarino	6	6
WC	(United States) Michael Grant	0	3
(Switzerland) Adrien Bossel	3	3
8	(Estonia) Jürgen Zopp	6	6

Qualifying competition
3	(France) Adrian Mannarino	6	6
8	(Estonia) Jürgen Zopp	3	0

==== Fourth qualifier ====
First round
(Netherlands) Wesley Koolhof	6	3	5
(Mexico) Santiago González	3	6	7
(Austria) Gibril Diarra	3	6^{2}
(Austria) Oliver Marach	6	7^{7}
(Japan) Hiroyasu Ehara	6	6
7	(Russia) Evgeny Donskoy	4	4

Second round
4	(Slovakia) Lukáš Lacko	7	2	6
(Mexico) Santiago González	5	6	4
(Austria) Oliver Marach	4	6	6
(Japan) Hiroyasu Ehara	6	1	2

Qualifying competition
4	(Slovakia) Lukáš Lacko	7^{7}	6
(Austria) Oliver Marach	6^{5}	2
