= 2013 Topshelf Open – Women's doubles =

Women's doubles
- 2013 Topshelf Open

Final
- Champions: (Romania) Irina-Camelia Begu (Spain) Anabel Medina Garrigues
- Runners-up: (Slovakia) Dominika Cibulková (Spain) Arantxa Parra Santonja
- Score: 4–6, 7–6^{(7–3)}, [11–9]

Details
- Draw: 16
- Seeds: 4

Events
Singles	men	women
Doubles	men	women
← 2012 ·	Topshelf Open	· 2014 →

Sara Errani and Roberta Vinci were the defending champions but decided not to participate.
Irina-Camelia Begu and Anabel Medina Garrigues won the title beating Dominika Cibulková and Arantxa Parra Santonja in the final, 4–6, 7–6^{(7–3)}, [11–9].

== Seeds ==
1. (Slovakia) Daniela Hantuchová / (Czech Republic) Andrea Hlaváčková (quarterfinals, retired)
2. (Romania) Irina-Camelia Begu / (Spain) Anabel Medina Garrigues (champions)
3. (Japan) Shuko Aoyama / (United States) Megan Moulton-Levy (semifinals)
4. (Russia) Nina Bratchikova / (Belarus) Olga Govortsova (first round)

== Draw ==
=== Key ===
- Q = Qualifier
- WC = Wild card
- LL = Lucky loser
- Alt = Alternate
- ITF = ITF entry
- PR = Protected ranking
- SR = Special ranking
- SE = Special exempt
- JE = Junior exempt
- JR = Junior Accelerator Programme entrant
- CO = College Accelerator Programme entrant
- NG = Next Gen Accelerator Program entrant
- w/o = Walkover
- r = Retired
- d = Defaulted

=== Draw ===
First round
(Spain) L Domínguez Lino (Spain) G Muguruza	7	6
(Spain) S Soler Espinosa (Spain) C Suárez Navarro	5	4
4	(Russia) N Bratchikova (Belarus) O Govortsova	4	3
(Slovakia) D Cibulková (Spain) A Parra Santonja	6	6
(Russia) M Melnikova (Belarus) P Pekhova	3	3
WC	(Netherlands) D Schuurs (Netherlands) A van der Meet	6	6
(Netherlands) R Hogenkamp (Netherlands) A Rus	6	3	[10]
(Austria) S Klemenschits (Switzerland) R Oprandi	2	6	[4]
(Czech Republic) N Fraňková (Russia) M Kondratieva	5	2
3	(Japan) S Aoyama (United States) M Moulton-Levy	7	6
(Spain) E Cabeza Candela (Romania) A Cadanțu	5	0
(Sweden) S Arvidsson (Sweden) J Larsson	7	6
(Netherlands) K Bertens (Netherlands) M Krajicek	6^{2}	7	[7]
2	(Romania) I-C Begu (Spain) A Medina Garrigues	7^{7}	5	[10]

Quarterfinals
1	(Slovakia) D Hantuchová (Czech Republic) A Hlaváčková
(Spain) L Domínguez Lino (Spain) G Muguruza	w/o
(Slovakia) D Cibulková (Spain) A Parra Santonja	6	5	[10]
WC	(Netherlands) D Schuurs (Netherlands) A van der Meet	4	7	[5]
(Netherlands) R Hogenkamp (Netherlands) A Rus	6^{1}	2
3	(Japan) S Aoyama (United States) M Moulton-Levy	7^{7}	6
(Sweden) S Arvidsson (Sweden) J Larsson	6	4	[8]
2	(Romania) I-C Begu (Spain) A Medina Garrigues	4	6	[10]

Semifinals
(Spain) L Domínguez Lino (Spain) G Muguruza	6^{2}	6^{0}
(Slovakia) D Cibulková (Spain) A Parra Santonja	7^{7}	7^{7}
3	(Japan) S Aoyama (United States) M Moulton-Levy	7	2	[2]
2	(Romania) I-C Begu (Spain) A Medina Garrigues	5	6	[10]

Final
(Slovakia) D Cibulková (Spain) A Parra Santonja	6	6^{3}	[9]
2	(Romania) I-C Begu (Spain) A Medina Garrigues	4	7^{7}	[11]
