= 2012 UNICEF Open – Men's doubles =

Men's doubles
- 2012 UNICEF Open

Final
- Champions: (Sweden) Robert Lindstedt (Romania) Horia Tecău
- Runners-up: (Colombia) Juan Sebastián Cabal (Russia) Dmitry Tursunov
- Score: 6–3, 7–6^{(7–1)}

Events
Singles	men	women
Doubles	men	women
← 2011 ·	UNICEF Open	· 2013 →

Daniele Bracciali and František Čermák were the defending champions but Bracciali decided not to participate here, instead of 2012 Aegon International.
Čermák played alongside Filip Polášek but lost in the Quarterfinals.
Robert Lindstedt and Horia Tecău won the title by beating Juan Sebastián Cabal and Dmitry Tursunov 6–3, 7–6^{(7–1)} in the final.

== Seeds ==
1. (Sweden) Robert Lindstedt / (Romania) Horia Tecău (champions)
2. (Pakistan) Aisam-ul-Haq Qureshi / (Netherlands) Jean-Julien Rojer (quarterfinals)
3. (Czech Republic) František Čermák / (Slovakia) Filip Polášek (quarterfinals)
4. (United States) Scott Lipsky / (India) Leander Paes (first round)

== Draw ==
=== Key ===
- Q = Qualifier
- WC = Wild card
- LL = Lucky loser
- Alt = Alternate
- SE = Special exempt
- PR = Protected ranking
- ITF = ITF entry
- JE = Junior exempt
- w/o = Walkover
- r = Retired
- d = Defaulted
- SR = Special ranking

=== Draw ===
First round
1	(Sweden) R Lindstedt (Romania) H Tecău	6	6
(France) B Paire (France) É Roger-Vasselin	4	2
(Mexico) S González (Germany) C Kas	7^{7}	2	[8]
(Russia) A Bogomolov Jr. (United States) J Cerretani	6^{4}	6	[10]
3	(Czech Republic) F Čermák (Slovakia) F Polášek	6	7^{7}
(Luxembourg) G Müller (Belgium) O Rochus	4	6^{5}
(Croatia) I Dodig (Brazil) M Melo	7^{9}	3	[8]
WC	(Sweden) J Brunström (Germany) P Marx	6^{7}	6	[10]
Alt	(Germany) M Emmrich (Germany) M Kohlmann	1	4
(Belgium) X Malisse (Belgium) D Norman	6	6
(Colombia) JS Cabal (Russia) D Tursunov	6	7
4	(United States) S Lipsky (India) L Paes	2	5
(Netherlands) R Haase (Finland) J Nieminen	2	6^{7}
(Germany) B Becker (Germany) P Petzschner	6	7^{9}
(Colombia) A Falla (Colombia) S Giraldo	6^{4}	2
2	(Pakistan) A-u-H Qureshi (Netherlands) J-J Rojer	7^{7}	6

Quarterfinals
1	(Sweden) R Lindstedt (Romania) H Tecău	6	7^{7}
(Russia) A Bogomolov Jr. (United States) J Cerretani	3	6^{4}
3	(Czech Republic) F Čermák (Slovakia) F Polášek	1	6^{4}
WC	(Sweden) J Brunström (Germany) P Marx	6	7^{7}
(Belgium) X Malisse (Belgium) D Norman	4	4
(Colombia) JS Cabal (Russia) D Tursunov	6	6
(Germany) B Becker (Germany) P Petzschner	3	6	[10]
2	(Pakistan) A-u-H Qureshi (Netherlands) J-J Rojer	6	3	[4]

Semifinals
1	(Sweden) R Lindstedt (Romania) H Tecău	7^{7}	7^{7}
WC	(Sweden) J Brunström (Germany) P Marx	6^{5}	6^{2}
(Colombia) JS Cabal (Russia) D Tursunov	7^{7}	7^{7}
(Germany) B Becker (Germany) P Petzschner	6^{2}	6^{4}

Final
1	(Sweden) R Lindstedt (Romania) H Tecău	6	7^{7}
(Colombia) JS Cabal (Russia) D Tursunov	3	6^{1}
