= 2015 Topshelf Open – Men's doubles =

Men's doubles
- 2015 Topshelf Open

Final
- Champions: (Croatia) Ivo Karlović (Poland) Łukasz Kubot
- Runners-up: (France) Pierre-Hugues Herbert (France) Nicolas Mahut
- Score: 6–2, 7–6^{(11–9)}

Events
Singles	men	women
Doubles	men	women
← 2014 ·	Topshelf Open	· 2016 →

Jean-Julien Rojer and Horia Tecău were the defending champions, but lost in the semifinals to Ivo Karlović and Łukasz Kubot.
Karlović and Kubot went on to win the title, defeating Pierre-Hugues Herbert and Nicolas Mahut in the final, 6–2, 7–6^{(11–9)}.

== Seeds ==
1. (Netherlands) Jean-Julien Rojer / (Romania) Horia Tecău (semifinals)
2. (Canada) Daniel Nestor / (India) Leander Paes (quarterfinals)
3. (United Kingdom) Jamie Murray / (Australia) John Peers (semifinals)
4. (Croatia) Marin Draganja / (Finland) Henri Kontinen (first round)

== Draw ==
=== Key ===
- Q = Qualifier
- WC = Wild card
- LL = Lucky loser
- Alt = Alternate
- SE = Special exempt
- PR = Protected ranking
- ITF = ITF entry
- JE = Junior exempt
- w/o = Walkover
- r = Retired
- d = Defaulted
- SR = Special ranking

=== Draw ===
First round
1	(Netherlands) J-J Rojer (Romania) H Tecău	6^{4}	6	[10]
(Chinese Taipei) Y-h Lu (Austria) O Marach	7^{7}	2	[4]
(Luxembourg) G Müller (Pakistan) A-u-H Qureshi	6	2	[10]
WC	(Netherlands) R Haase (France) B Paire	4	6	[7]
4	(Croatia) M Draganja (Finland) H Kontinen	6	3	[5]
WC	(Australia) L Hewitt (Australia) M Reid	2	6	[10]
(Sweden) R Lindstedt (United States) S Lipsky	0	3
(Croatia) I Karlović (Poland) Ł Kubot	6	6
(Australia) C Guccione (Brazil) A Sá	4	6^{5}
(South Africa) R Klaasen (United States) R Ram	6	7^{7}
(United States) N Monroe (New Zealand) A Sitak	1	4
3	(United Kingdom) J Murray (Australia) J Peers	6	6
(France) P-H Herbert (France) N Mahut	4	6	[10]
(Spain) G García-López (Austria) P Oswald	6	4	[3]
(Spain) R Bautista Agut (Spain) D Gimeno-Traver	4	3
2	(Canada) D Nestor (India) L Paes	6	6

Quarterfinals
1	(Netherlands) J-J Rojer (Romania) H Tecău	7^{7}	7^{7}
(Luxembourg) G Müller (Pakistan) A-u-H Qureshi	6^{3}	6^{5}
WC	(Australia) L Hewitt (Australia) M Reid
(Croatia) I Karlović (Poland) Ł Kubot	w/o
(South Africa) R Klaasen (United States) R Ram	4	6^{2}
3	(United Kingdom) J Murray (Australia) J Peers	6	7^{7}
(France) P-H Herbert (France) N Mahut	6	7^{9}
2	(Canada) D Nestor (India) L Paes	4	6^{7}

Semifinals
1	(Netherlands) J-J Rojer (Romania) H Tecău	1	6	[2]
(Croatia) I Karlović (Poland) Ł Kubot	6	3	[10]
3	(United Kingdom) J Murray (Australia) J Peers	3	6^{5}
(France) P-H Herbert (France) N Mahut	6	7^{7}

Final
(Croatia) I Karlović (Poland) Ł Kubot	6	7^{11}
(France) P-H Herbert (France) N Mahut	2	6^{9}
