= 2014 Topshelf Open – Women's singles =

Women's singles
- 2014 Topshelf Open

Final
- Champion: (United States) CoCo Vandeweghe
- Runner-up: (China) Zheng Jie
- Score: 6–2, 6–4

Details
- Draw: 32 (4 Q / 3 WC )
- Seeds: 8

Events
Singles	men	women
Doubles	men	women
← 2013 ·	Topshelf Open	· 2015 →

Simona Halep was the defending champion, but she retired in the second round against Annika Beck.

Qualifier CoCo Vandeweghe won her maiden WTA title, defeating Zheng Jie in the final, 6–2, 6–4.

== Seeds ==
1. (Romania) Simona Halep (second round, retired)
2. (Slovakia) Dominika Cibulková (first round)
3. (Canada) Eugenie Bouchard (first round)
4. (Spain) Carla Suárez Navarro (second round, retired)
5. (Germany) Andrea Petkovic (second round)
6. (Belgium) Kirsten Flipkens (second round)
7. (Spain) Garbiñe Muguruza (quarterfinals)
8. (Czech Republic) Klára Koukalová (semifinals)

== Draw ==
=== Key ===
- Q = Qualifier
- WC = Wild card
- LL = Lucky loser
- Alt = Alternate
- ITF = ITF entry
- PR = Protected ranking
- SR = Special ranking
- SE = Special exempt
- JE = Junior exempt
- JR = Junior Accelerator Programme entrant
- CO = College Accelerator Programme entrant
- NG = Next Gen Accelerator Program entrant
- w/o = Walkover
- r = Retired
- d = Defaulted

=== Finals ===
Semifinals
(Slovakia) Magdaléna Rybáriková	1	3
(China) Zheng Jie	6	6
Q	(United States) CoCo Vandeweghe	6	6
8	(Czech Republic) Klára Koukalová	4	2

Final
(China) Zheng Jie	2	4
Q	(United States) CoCo Vandeweghe	6	6

=== Top half ===
First round
1	(Romania) S Halep	7	6
Q	(Belarus) O Govortsova	5	2
Q	(Israel) J Glushko	6^{5}	5
(Germany) A Beck	7^{7}	7
(Slovakia) M Rybáriková	6	6
WC	(Belgium) A-S Mestach	4	4
(Belgium) Y Wickmayer	2	4
5	(Germany) A Petkovic	6	6
4	(Spain) C Suárez Navarro	6	6
(Czech Republic) B Záhlavová-Strýcová	4	2
(China) J Zheng	6	7
(Puerto Rico) M Puig	4	5
(Ukraine) E Svitolina	6	6
(Japan) K Nara	2	1
(Slovenia) P Hercog	4	0
6	(Belgium) K Flipkens	6	6

Second round
1	(Romania) S Halep	7	2^{r}
(Germany) A Beck	5	3
(Slovakia) M Rybáriková	6	6^{4}	7
5	(Germany) A Petkovic	4	7^{7}	5
4	(Spain) C Suárez Navarro	5	1^{r}
(China) J Zheng	7	0
(Ukraine) E Svitolina	7^{7}	6
6	(Belgium) K Flipkens	6^{4}	4

Quarterfinals
(Germany) A Beck	2	5
(Slovakia) M Rybáriková	6	7
(China) J Zheng	6	6
(Ukraine) E Svitolina	3	0

Semifinals
(Slovakia) M Rybáriková	1	3
(China) J Zheng	6	6

=== Bottom half ===
First round
7	(Spain) G Muguruza	6	6
WC	(Netherlands) L Kerkhove	4	2
(Estonia) K Kanepi	1	2
(Austria) Y Meusburger	6	6
(New Zealand) M Erakovic	4	6	6^{5}
Q	(United States) C Vandeweghe	6	3	7^{7}
(United States) V King	2	6	6
3	(Canada) E Bouchard	6	3	3
8	(Czech Republic) K Koukalová	7^{7}	2	6
(Spain) MT Torró Flor	6^{5}	6	2
Q	(Germany) M Barthel	6	6
(Russia) M Kirilenko	3	2
(Slovakia) J Čepelová	3	6	1
WC	(Netherlands) M Krajicek	6	4	6
(Kazakhstan) Y Shvedova	6	3	6
2	(Slovakia) D Cibulková	2	6	3

Second round
7	(Spain) G Muguruza	6	6
(Austria) Y Meusburger	4	1
Q	(United States) C Vandeweghe	6^{6}	6	2
(United States) V King	7^{8}	0	1^{r}
8	(Czech Republic) K Koukalová	6	7^{8}
Q	(Germany) M Barthel	2	6^{6}
WC	(Netherlands) M Krajicek	6^{6}	6^{4}
(Kazakhstan) Y Shvedova	7^{8}	7^{7}

Quarterfinals
7	(Spain) G Muguruza	6^{3}	1
Q	(United States) C Vandeweghe	7^{7}	6
8	(Czech Republic) K Koukalová	6	6
(Kazakhstan) Y Shvedova	2	4

Semifinals
Q	(United States) C Vandeweghe	6	6
8	(Czech Republic) K Koukalová	4	2

== Qualifying ==
=== Seeds ===
1. (Germany) Mona Barthel (qualified)
2. (United States) CoCo Vandeweghe (qualified)
3. (Romania) Irina-Camelia Begu (first round)
4. (Israel) Julia Glushko (qualified)
5. (Israel) Shahar Pe'er (first round)
6. (Belgium) Alison Van Uytvanck (qualifying competition)
7. (Poland) Urszula Radwańska (qualifying competition)
8. (France) Kristina Mladenovic (qualifying competition)

=== Qualifiers ===
1. (Germany) Mona Barthel
2. (United States) CoCo Vandeweghe
3. (Belarus) Olga Govortsova
4. (Israel) Julia Glushko

=== Draw ===
==== First qualifier ====
First round
1	(Germany) Mona Barthel	7^{8}	6
(Germany) Dinah Pfizenmaier	6^{6}	2
(Spain) Lourdes Domínguez Lino	1	4
7	(Poland) Urszula Radwańska	6	6

Qualifying competition
1	(Germany) Mona Barthel	6	6
7	(Poland) Urszula Radwańska	3	2

==== Second qualifier ====
First round
2	(United States) CoCo Vandeweghe	6	6
(United States) Nicole Melichar	2	4
(Greece) Eleni Daniilidou	1	2
8	(France) Kristina Mladenovic	6	6

Qualifying competition
2	(United States) Coco Vandeweghe	6	2	6
8	(France) Kristina Mladenovic	2	6	4

==== Third qualifier ====
First round
3	(Romania) Irina-Camelia Begu	3	6^{9}
(Belarus) Olga Govortsova	6	7^{11}
WC	(Netherlands) Demi Schuurs	1	2
6	(Belgium) Alison Van Uytvanck	6	6

Qualifying competition
(Belarus) Olga Govortsova	6	3	6
6	(Belgium) Alison Van Uytvanck	2	6	3

==== Fourth qualifier ====
First round
4	(Israel) Julia Glushko	6	6
(Spain) Arantxa Parra Santonja	2	4
WC	(Netherlands) Arantxa Rus	6	6
5	(Israel) Shahar Pe'er	4	2

Qualifying competition
4	(Israel) Julia Glushko	6	5	6
WC	(Netherlands) Arantxa Rus	4	7	1
