= 2012 UNICEF Open – Men's singles =

Men's singles
- 2012 UNICEF Open

Final
- Champion: (Spain) David Ferrer
- Runner-up: (Germany) Philipp Petzschner
- Score: 6–3, 6–4

Details
- Draw: 32 (4 Q / 3 WC )
- Seeds: 8

Events
Singles	men	women
Doubles	men	women
← 2011 ·	UNICEF Open	· 2013 →

Dmitry Tursunov was the defending champion but lost in the first round to qualifier Philipp Petzschner.
David Ferrer won the title by beating Petzschner 6–3, 6–4 in the final.

== Seeds ==
1. (Spain) David Ferrer (champion)
2. (Serbia) Viktor Troicki (first round)
3. (Austria) Jürgen Melzer (second round)
4. (Netherlands) Robin Haase (first round)
5. (Colombia) Santiago Giraldo (first round)
6. (Finland) Jarkko Nieminen (first round)
7. (Russia) Alex Bogomolov Jr. (first round)
8. (Poland) Łukasz Kubot (second round)

== Draw ==
=== Key ===
- Q = Qualifier
- WC = Wild card
- LL = Lucky loser
- Alt = Alternate
- SE = Special exempt
- PR = Protected ranking
- ITF = ITF entry
- JE = Junior exempt
- w/o = Walkover
- r = Retired
- d = Defaulted
- SR = Special ranking

=== Finals ===
Semifinals
1	(Spain) David Ferrer	7^{7}	3	6
(France) Benoît Paire	6^{5}	6	1
Q	(Germany) Philipp Petzschner	7	7
(Belgium) Xavier Malisse	5	5

Final
1	(Spain) David Ferrer	6	6
Q	(Germany) Philipp Petzschner	3	4

=== Top half ===
First round
1	(Spain) D Ferrer	6	6
Q	(Canada) P-L Duclos	4	4
(Argentina) L Mayer	6	6
Q	(Russia) M Ledovskikh	4	2
(Belgium) O Rochus	6	4
(Tunisia) M Jaziri	3	0^{r}
WC	(Netherlands) I Sijsling	6	6
6	(Finland) J Nieminen	2	4
3	(Austria) J Melzer	6	6
(Russia) I Kunitsyn	1	1
(Japan) T Ito	3	6	7^{7}
Q	(Hungary) M Fucsovics	6	3	6^{2}
WC	(Belgium) D Goffin	1	4
(France) B Paire	6	6
(Israel) D Sela	1	2
8	(Poland) Ł Kubot	6	6

Second round
1	(Spain) D Ferrer	6	6
(Argentina) L Mayer	3	1
(Belgium) O Rochus	5	6^{4}
WC	(Netherlands) I Sijsling	7	7^{7}
3	(Austria) J Melzer	2	2
(Japan) T Ito	6	6
(France) B Paire	6	0	6
8	(Poland) Ł Kubot	3	6	4

Quarterfinals
1	(Spain) D Ferrer	6	6
WC	(Netherlands) I Sijsling	0	1
(Japan) T Ito	3	5
(France) B Paire	6	7

Semifinals
1	(Spain) D Ferrer	7^{7}	3	6
(France) B Paire	6^{5}	6	1

=== Bottom half ===
First round
7	(Russia) A Bogomolov	4	4
(France) É Roger-Vasselin	6	6
(Italy) F Cipolla	4
(Italy) P Starace	2^{r}
Q	(Germany) P Petzschner	6	6
(Russia) D Tursunov	4	2
WC	(Croatia) M Pavić	6	7^{7}
4	(Netherlands) R Haase	4	6^{2}
5	(Colombia) S Giraldo	6^{5}	7^{7}	3
(Luxembourg) G Müller	7^{7}	6^{4}	6
(Colombia) A Falla	6	6
(Spain) R Ramírez Hidalgo	4	4
(Italy) P Lorenzi	6	6
(Croatia) I Dodig	4	4
(Belgium) X Malisse	7^{7}	6
2	(Serbia) V Troicki	6^{4}	2

Second round
(France) É Roger-Vasselin	6	3	6
(Italy) F Cipolla	2	6	1
Q	(Germany) P Petzschner	w/o
WC	(Croatia) M Pavić
(Luxembourg) G Müller	6	6
(Colombia) A Falla	3	0
(Italy) P Lorenzi	6^{3}	2
(Belgium) X Malisse	7^{7}	6

Quarterfinals
(France) É Roger-Vasselin	4	6^{6}
Q	(Germany) P Petzschner	6	7^{8}
(Luxembourg) G Müller	3	6	1
(Belgium) X Malisse	6	4	6

Semifinals
Q	(Germany) P Petzschner	7	7
(Belgium) X Malisse	5	5

== Qualifying ==
=== Seeds ===
1. (Germany) Benjamin Becker (qualifying competition)
2. (Germany) Philipp Petzschner (qualified)
3. (Netherlands) Thomas Schoorel (second round)
4. (Germany) Peter Torebko (first round)
5. (Canada) Pierre-Ludovic Duclos (qualified)
6. (Australia) Matt Reid (second round)
7. (Ukraine) Denys Molchanov (second round)
8. (Italy) Riccardo Ghedin (first round, retired because of a groin injury)

=== Qualifiers ===
1. (Russia) Mikhail Ledovskikh
2. (Germany) Philipp Petzschner
3. (Canada) Pierre-Ludovic Duclos
4. (Hungary) Márton Fucsovics

=== Draw ===
==== First qualifier ====
First round
1	(Germany) Benjamin Becker	6	6
(France) Pierre-Hugues Herbert	4	4
(Bulgaria) Alexander Lazov	6	6
(Russia) Kirill Dmitriev	3	4
(Kazakhstan) Evgeny Korolev	6	3	2
(Russia) Mikhail Ledovskikh	2	6	6
WC	(Belgium) Kimmer Coppejans	6^{3}	4
7	(Ukraine) Denys Molchanov	7^{7}	6

Second round
1	(Germany) Benjamin Becker	6	6
(Bulgaria) Alexander Lazov	3	3
(Russia) Mikhail Ledovskikh	7	6
7	(Ukraine) Denys Molchanov	5	3

Qualifying competition
1	(Germany) Benjamin Becker	4	4
(Russia) Mikhail Ledovskikh	6	6

==== Second qualifier ====
First round
2	(Germany) Philipp Petzschner	6	6
WC	(Switzerland) George Bastl	3	1
(Colombia) Juan Sebastián Cabal	6	7^{8}
(Italy) Andrea Agazzi	2	6^{6}
(Austria) Gibril Diarra	4	4
(Australia) John-Patrick Smith	6	6
(Switzerland) Adrien Bossel	4	6	1
6	(Australia) Matt Reid	6	3	6

Second round
2	(Germany) Philipp Petzschner	6	6
(Colombia) Juan Sebastián Cabal	2	2
(Australia) John-Patrick Smith	4	6	6
6	(Australia) Matt Reid	6	1	4

Qualifying competition
2	(Germany) Philipp Petzschner	6	7
(Australia) John-Patrick Smith	2	6^{3}

==== Third qualifier ====
First round
3	(Netherlands) Thomas Schoorel	4	6	6
(Switzerland) Alexander Sadecky	6	4	2
(France) Albano Olivetti	6^{4}	3
(Belgium) Niels Desein	7^{7}	6
(Switzerland) Yann Marti	2	6	4
(Netherlands) Alban Meuffels	6	4	6
(Netherlands) Matthew Pierot	6	5	4
5	(Canada) Pierre-Ludovic Duclos	4	7	6

Second round
3	(Netherlands) Thomas Schoorel	3	5
(Belgium) Niels Desein	6	7
(Netherlands) Alban Meuffels	7^{8}	2	4
5	(Canada) Pierre-Ludovic Duclos	6^{6}	6	6

Qualifying competition
(Belgium) Niels Desein	6^{8}	4
5	(Canada) Pierre-Ludovic Duclos	7^{10}	6

==== Fourth qualifier ====
First round
4	(Germany) Peter Torebko	4	6^{4}
(New Zealand) Artem Sitak	6	7^{7}
(Croatia) Nikola Mektić	6	6
(France) Clément Reix	3	4
WC	(Netherlands) David Pel	3	4
WC	(Germany) Christopher Kas	6	6
(Hungary) Márton Fucsovics	7^{11}	1
8	(Italy) Riccardo Ghedin	6^{9}	0^{r}

Second round
(New Zealand) Artem Sitak	7^{7}	3	2
(Croatia) Nikola Mektić	6^{4}	6	6
WC	(Germany) Christopher Kas	7^{7}	2	5
(Hungary) Márton Fucsovics	6^{4}	6	7

Qualifying competition
(Croatia) Nikola Mektić	2	6^{3}
(Hungary) Márton Fucsovics	6	7^{7}
