= 2013 Topshelf Open – Women's singles =

Women's singles
- 2013 Topshelf Open

Final
- Champion: (Romania) Simona Halep
- Runner-up: (Belgium) Kirsten Flipkens
- Score: 6–4, 6–2

Details
- Draw: 32 (4 Q / 3 WC )
- Seeds: 8

Events
Singles	men	women
Doubles	men	women
← 2012 ·	Topshelf Open	· 2014 →

Nadia Petrova was the defending champion, but she chose to compete in Eastbourne instead.

Simona Halep won the title beating in the final Kirsten Flipkens, 6–4, 6–2.

== Seeds ==
1. (Italy) Roberta Vinci (second round)
2. (Slovakia) Dominika Cibulková (quarterfinals)
3. (Spain) Carla Suárez Navarro (semifinals)
4. (Belgium) Kirsten Flipkens (final)
5. (Germany) Mona Barthel (first round)
6. (Switzerland) Romina Oprandi (withdrew)
7. (Poland) Urszula Radwańska (quarterfinals)
8. (France) Kristina Mladenovic (first round)

== Draw ==
=== Key ===
- Q = Qualifier
- WC = Wild card
- LL = Lucky loser
- Alt = Alternate
- ITF = ITF entry
- PR = Protected ranking
- SR = Special ranking
- SE = Special exempt
- JE = Junior exempt
- JR = Junior Accelerator Programme entrant
- CO = College Accelerator Programme entrant
- NG = Next Gen Accelerator Program entrant
- w/o = Walkover
- r = Retired
- d = Defaulted

=== Finals ===
Semifinals
(Romania) Simona Halep	6	6
3	(Spain) Carla Suárez Navarro	3	2
4	(Belgium) Kirsten Flipkens	6	6
Q	(Spain) Garbiñe Muguruza	3	1

Final
(Romania) Simona Halep	6	6
4	(Belgium) Kirsten Flipkens	4	2

=== Top half ===
First round
1	(Italy) R Vinci	6	6
(Estonia) K Kanepi	3	3
(Germany) A Beck	1	6	3
(Romania) S Halep	6	2	6
(Switzerland) S Vögele	7	4	7
Q	(Kazakhstan) Y Putintseva	5	6	5
WC	(Slovakia) D Hantuchová	0^{r}
LL	(Ukraine) L Tsurenko	5
3	(Spain) C Suárez Navarro	6	6
(Sweden) J Larsson	3	2
(Sweden) S Arvidsson	3	6	6
(Japan) A Morita	6	2	4
Q	(Belgium) A-S Mestach	7^{8}	3	4
(Romania) I-C Begu	6^{6}	6	6
(Bulgaria) T Pironkova	6	6
8	(France) K Mladenovic	4	4

Second round
1	(Italy) R Vinci	0	1
(Romania) S Halep	6	6
(Switzerland) S Vögele	1	6^{4}
LL	(Ukraine) L Tsurenko	6	7^{7}
3	(Spain) C Suárez Navarro	6	6
(Sweden) S Arvidsson	3	4
(Romania) I-C Begu	6^{7}	2
(Bulgaria) T Pironkova	7^{9}	6

Quarterfinals
(Romania) S Halep	6	6
LL	(Ukraine) L Tsurenko	3	1
3	(Spain) C Suárez Navarro	2	6	6
(Bulgaria) T Pironkova	6	4	4

Semifinals
(Romania) S Halep	6	6
3	(Spain) C Suárez Navarro	3	2

=== Bottom half ===
First round
7	(Poland) U Radwańska	6	6
(Belarus) O Govortsova	2	0
(Slovakia) M Rybáriková	7	6
WC	(Netherlands) A Rus	5	2
WC	(Netherlands) M Krajicek	7	6
(Spain) S Soler Espinosa	5	4
(Italy) F Schiavone	6	3	0
4	(Belgium) K Flipkens	3	6	6
5	(Germany) M Barthel	5	6	2
Q	(Spain) G Muguruza	7	1	6
Q	(Czech Republic) A Hlaváčková	3	4
(United States) L Davis	6	6
(Netherlands) K Bertens	1	2
(Spain) A Medina Garrigues	6	6
(Spain) L Domínguez Lino	1	7^{7}	6^{3}
2	(Slovakia) D Cibulková	6	6^{5}	7^{7}

Second round
7	(Poland) U Radwańska	4
(Slovakia) M Rybáriková	3^{r}
WC	(Netherlands) M Krajicek	6^{6}	6^{3}
4	(Belgium) K Flipkens	7^{8}	7^{7}
Q	(Spain) G Muguruza	6	6
(United States) L Davis	2	0
(Spain) A Medina Garrigues	6	4	3
2	(Slovakia) D Cibulková	2	6	6

Quarterfinals
7	(Poland) U Radwańska	4	4
4	(Belgium) K Flipkens	6	6
Q	(Spain) G Muguruza	6	6
2	(Slovakia) D Cibulková	4	4

Semifinals
4	(Belgium) K Flipkens	6	6
Q	(Spain) G Muguruza	3	1

== Qualifying ==
=== Seeds ===
1. (United States) Mallory Burdette (first round)
2. (Spain) Garbiñe Muguruza (qualified)
3. (Ukraine) Lesia Tsurenko (qualifying competition, lucky loser)
4. (Romania) Alexandra Cadanțu (first round)
5. (Kazakhstan) Yulia Putintseva (qualified)
6. (Czech Republic) Andrea Hlaváčková (qualified)
7. (Spain) Estrella Cabeza Candela (qualifying competition)
8. (Serbia) Vesna Dolonc (qualifying competition, retired)

=== Qualifiers ===
1. (Kazakhstan) Yulia Putintseva
2. (Spain) Garbiñe Muguruza
3. (Czech Republic) Andrea Hlaváčková
4. (Belgium) An-Sophie Mestach

=== Draw ===
==== First qualifier ====
First round
1	(United States) Mallory Burdette	6	4	0
(Portugal) Nina Bratchikova	2	6	6
(Russia) Daria Gavrilova	1	2
5	(Kazakhstan) Yulia Putintseva	6	6

Qualifying competition
(Portugal) Nina Bratchikova	3	6	1
5	(Kazakhstan) Yulia Putintseva	6	1	6

==== Second qualifier ====
First round
2	(Spain) Garbiñe Muguruza	7^{7}	7
WC	(Netherlands) Richèl Hogenkamp	6^{3}	5
(Croatia) Tereza Mrdeža	4	6	4
7	(Spain) Estrella Cabeza Candela	6	2	6

Qualifying competition
2	(Spain) Garbiñe Muguruza	6	6
7	(Spain) Estrella Cabeza Candela	3	2

==== Third qualifier ====
First round
3	(Ukraine) Lesia Tsurenko	7^{7}	3	7
(Belgium) Alison Van Uytvanck	6^{1}	6	5
WC	(Netherlands) Indy de Vroome	2	0
6	(Czech Republic) Andrea Hlaváčková	6	6

Qualifying competition
3	(Ukraine) Lesia Tsurenko	6	3	4
6	(Czech Republic) Andrea Hlaváčková	4	6	6

==== Fourth qualifier ====
First round
4	(Romania) Alexandra Cadanțu	2	6	6^{5}
(Belgium) An-Sophie Mestach	6	4	7^{7}
(Hungary) Gréta Arn	5	1
8	(Serbia) Vesna Dolonc	7	6

Qualifying competition
(Belgium) An-Sophie Mestach	3
8	(Serbia) Vesna Dolonc	3^{r}
