= 2013 Topshelf Open – Men's singles =

Men's singles
- 2013 Topshelf Open

Final
- Champion: (France) Nicolas Mahut
- Runner-up: (Switzerland) Stanislas Wawrinka
- Score: 6–3, 6–4

Details
- Draw: 32 (4 Q / 3 WC )
- Seeds: 8

Events
Singles	men	women
Doubles	men	women
← 2012 ·	Topshelf Open	· 2014 →

David Ferrer was the defending champion, but lost in the first round to Xavier Malisse.
Qualifier Nicolas Mahut won the first title of his career, beating Stanislas Wawrinka in the final, 6–3, 6–4.

== Seeds ==
1. (Spain) David Ferrer (first round)
2. (Switzerland) Stanislas Wawrinka (final)
3. (United States) John Isner (first round)
4. (France) Benoît Paire (first round, retired because of a thigh injury)
5. (France) Jérémy Chardy (quarterfinals)
6. (Cyprus) Marcos Baghdatis (first round)
7. (Romania) Victor Hănescu (first round)
8. (Spain) Daniel Gimeno-Traver (first round)

== Draw ==
=== Key ===
- Q = Qualifier
- WC = Wild card
- LL = Lucky loser
- Alt = Alternate
- SE = Special exempt
- PR = Protected ranking
- ITF = ITF entry
- JE = Junior exempt
- w/o = Walkover
- r = Retired
- d = Defaulted
- SR = Special ranking

=== Finals ===
Semifinals
(Belgium) Xavier Malisse	3	3
Q	(France) Nicolas Mahut	6	6
(Spain) Guillermo García-López	1	4
2	(Switzerland) Stanislas Wawrinka	6	6

Final
Q	(France) Nicolas Mahut	6	6
2	(Switzerland) Stanislas Wawrinka	3	4

=== Top half ===
First round
1	(Spain) D Ferrer	6^{3}	3
(Belgium) X Malisse	7^{7}	6
(France) É Roger-Vasselin	1	6^{3}
(Chinese Taipei) Y-h Lu	6	7^{7}
(Spain) R Bautista-Agut	3	7^{7}	7^{14}
Q	(Switzerland) S Bohli	6	6^{5}	6^{12}
(Argentina) C Berlocq	6	6
6	(Cyprus) M Baghdatis	2	4
3	(United States) J Isner	7^{7}	3	4
(Russia) E Donskoy	6^{3}	6	6
(Argentina) L Mayer	6	1	4
(Netherlands) R Haase	4	6	6
Q	(France) N Mahut	6	6
(Lithuania) R Berankis	1	4
(Russia) A Kuznetsov	7^{7}	6
8	(Spain) D Gimeno-Traver	6^{4}	3

Second round
(Belgium) X Malisse	3	6	6
(Chinese Taipei) Y-h Lu	6	1	4
(Spain) R Bautista-Agut	6	6
(Argentina) C Berlocq	2	3
(Russia) E Donskoy	6	7
(Netherlands) R Haase	4	5
Q	(France) N Mahut	6	6
(Russia) A Kuznetsov	2	4

Quarterfinals
(Belgium) X Malisse	6	6
(Spain) R Bautista-Agut	4	4
(Russia) E Donskoy	3	6^{1}
Q	(France) N Mahut	6	7^{7}

Semifinals
(Belgium) X Malisse	3	3
Q	(France) N Mahut	6	6

=== Bottom half ===
First round
7	(Romania) V Hănescu	4	3
(Spain) G García-López	6	6
(Germany) D Brands	6	6
WC	(Netherlands) J Huta Galung	3	2
Q	(Czech Republic) J Hernych	6	3	7^{7}
(Belgium) D Goffin	3	6	6^{4}
(France) M Llodra	3
4	(France) B Paire	0^{r}
5	(France) J Chardy	7	6
Q	(France) L Pouille	5	4
(Brazil) R Dutra Silva	7^{7}	4	2
WC	(Romania) M Copil	6^{4}	6	6
(Italy) P Lorenzi	7^{7}	7^{7}
WC	(Netherlands) T de Bakker	6^{2}	6^{4}
LL	(Belgium) S Darcis	6^{5}	4
2	(Switzerland) S Wawrinka	7^{7}	6

Second round
(Spain) G García-López	7^{9}	6
(Germany) D Brands	6^{7}	2
Q	(Czech Republic) J Hernych	6^{5}	6	7
(France) M Llodra	7^{7}	4	5
5	(France) J Chardy	7	6
WC	(Romania) M Copil	5	4
(Italy) P Lorenzi	3	6^{8}
2	(Switzerland) S Wawrinka	6	7^{10}

Quarterfinals
(Spain) G García-López	6	6
Q	(Czech Republic) J Hernych	4	1
5	(France) J Chardy	4	6^{2}
2	(Switzerland) S Wawrinka	6	7^{7}

Semifinals
(Spain) G García-López	1	4
2	(Switzerland) S Wawrinka	6	6

== Qualifying ==
=== Seeds ===
1. (United States) Rajeev Ram (second round)
2. (Belgium) Steve Darcis (qualifying competition, Lucky loser)
3. (Poland) Łukasz Kubot (qualifying competition)
4. (Russia) Konstantin Kravchuk (qualifying competition)
5. (Belgium) Niels Desein (second round)
6. (France) Nicolas Mahut (qualified)
7. (Czech Republic) Jan Hernych (qualified)
8. (France) Lucas Pouille (qualified)

=== Qualifiers ===
1. (Czech Republic) Jan Hernych
2. (Switzerland) Stéphane Bohli
3. (France) Nicolas Mahut
4. (France) Lucas Pouille

=== Lucky loser ===
1. (Belgium) Steve Darcis

=== Draw ===
==== First qualifier ====
First round
(Germany) Robin Kern	6	6
WC	(Italy) Damiano di Ienno	1	1
(Ukraine) Vitalii Shcherba	6	6
WC	(Italy) Enrico Becuzzi	2	2
(Pakistan) Aisam-ul-Haq Qureshi	4	2
7	(Czech Republic) Jan Hernych	6	6

Second round
1	(United States) Rajeev Ram	3	5
(Germany) Robin Kern	6	7
(Ukraine) Vitalii Shcherba	2	2
7	(Czech Republic) Jan Hernych	6	6

Qualifying competition
(Germany) Robin Kern	2	2
7	(Czech Republic) Jan Hernych	6	6

==== Second qualifier ====
First round
2	(Belgium) Steve Darcis	3	6	6
(Germany) Stefan Seifert	6	3	2
(Canada) Érik Chvojka	4	0
(Italy) Riccardo Ghedin	6	6
(Switzerland) Stéphane Bohli	6	6
(Germany) Kevin Krawietz	3	4
(Austria) Dennis Novak	3	6	3
5	(Belgium) Niels Desein	6	3	6

Second round
2	(Belgium) Steve Darcis	6	6
(Italy) Riccardo Ghedin	2	4
(Switzerland) Stéphane Bohli	6	6
5	(Belgium) Niels Desein	2	3

Qualifying competition
2	(Belgium) Steve Darcis	6^{4}	6^{4}
(Switzerland) Stéphane Bohli	7^{7}	7^{7}

==== Third qualifier ====
First round
3	(Poland) Łukasz Kubot	6	6
(Germany) David Thurner	1	2
(Bulgaria) Alexander Lazov	3	6	6^{4}
(Switzerland) Adrien Bossel	6	1	7^{7}
(United States) Greg Ouellette	7	6
(Philippines) Treat Conrad Huey	5	1
(Netherlands) Alban Meuffels	3	2
6	(France) Nicolas Mahut	6	6

Second round
3	(Poland) Łukasz Kubot	6	7^{7}
(Switzerland) Adrien Bossel	4	6^{4}
(United States) Greg Ouellette	3	2
6	(France) Nicolas Mahut	6	6

Qualifying competition
3	(Poland) Łukasz Kubot	4	6	1
6	(France) Nicolas Mahut	6	3	6

==== Fourth qualifier ====
First round
4	(Russia) Konstantin Kravchuk	6	6
WC	(Belgium) Kimmer Coppejans	4	4
(Romania) Florin Mergea	7^{7}	7^{7}
(New Zealand) Sebastian Lavie	6^{5}	6^{3}
(Czech Republic) Lukáš Dlouhý	1	6^{3}
(Australia) Greg Jones	6	7^{7}
(Netherlands) Stephan Fransen	7^{7}	6^{3}	2
8	(France) Lucas Pouille	6^{5}	7^{7}	6

Second round
4	(Russia) Konstantin Kravchuk	3	6	6
(Romania) Florin Mergea	6	3	1
(Australia) Greg Jones	6	6^{4}	2
8	(France) Lucas Pouille	4	7^{7}	6

Qualifying competition
4	(Russia) Konstantin Kravchuk	5	6	6^{5}
8	(France) Lucas Pouille	7	4	7^{7}
