= 2012 UNICEF Open – Women's singles =

Women's singles
- 2012 UNICEF Open

Final
- Champion: (Russia) Nadia Petrova
- Runner-up: (Poland) Urszula Radwańska
- Score: 6–4, 6–3

Details
- Draw: 32 (4 Q / 3 WC )
- Seeds: 8

Events
Singles	men	women
Doubles	men	women
← 2011 ·	UNICEF Open	· 2013 →

Roberta Vinci was the defending champion, but lost to Kirsten Flipkens in the quarterfinals.

Eighth seed Nadia Petrova won the title, defeating Urszula Radwańska 6–4, 6–3, in the final.

== Seeds ==
1. (Australia) Samantha Stosur (first round)
2. (Italy) Sara Errani (first round)
3. (Slovakia) Dominika Cibulková (quarterfinals)
4. (Italy) Flavia Pennetta (second round)
5. (Russia) Maria Kirilenko (first round)
6. (Italy) Roberta Vinci (quarterfinals)
7. (Serbia) Jelena Janković (first round)
8. (Russia) Nadia Petrova (champion)

== Draw ==
=== Key ===
- Q = Qualifier
- WC = Wild card
- LL = Lucky loser
- Alt = Alternate
- ITF = ITF entry
- PR = Protected ranking
- SR = Special ranking
- SE = Special exempt
- JE = Junior exempt
- JR = Junior Accelerator Programme entrant
- CO = College Accelerator Programme entrant
- NG = Next Gen Accelerator Program entrant
- w/o = Walkover
- r = Retired
- d = Defaulted

=== Finals ===
Semifinals
Q	(Belgium) Kirsten Flipkens	4	2
8	(Russia) Nadia Petrova	6	6
Q	(Poland) Urszula Radwańska	w/o
(Belgium) Kim Clijsters

Final
8	(Russia) Nadia Petrova	6	6
Q	(Poland) Urszula Radwańska	4	3

=== Top half ===
First round
1	(Australia) S Stosur	6^{7}	3
Q	(Belgium) K Flipkens	7^{9}	6
(Belgium) Y Wickmayer	1	2
Q	(Russia) D Gavrilova	6	6
(Romania) M Niculescu	7^{8}	6
(Czech Republic) B Záhlavová-Strýcová	6^{6}	3
(Greece) E Daniilidou	3	5
6	(Italy) R Vinci	6	7
3	(Slovakia) D Cibulková	6	6
(Romania) A Cadanțu	2	2
(Israel) S Pe'er	6	6
Q	(Uzbekistan) A Amanmuradova	2	4
(Romania) S Halep	6^{3}	2
(Spain) A Medina Garrigues	7^{7}	6
WC	(Netherlands) K Bertens	2	4
8	(Russia) N Petrova	6	6

Second round
Q	(Belgium) K Flipkens	7	7^{7}
Q	(Russia) D Gavrilova	5	6^{4}
(Romania) M Niculescu	3	7^{7}	0
6	(Italy) R Vinci	6	6^{4}	6
3	(Slovakia) D Cibulková	6	7^{7}
(Israel) S Pe'er	2	6^{5}
(Spain) A Medina Garrigues	5	3
8	(Russia) N Petrova	7	6

Quarterfinals
Q	(Belgium) K Flipkens	6	7^{7}
6	(Italy) R Vinci	4	6^{5}
3	(Slovakia) D Cibulková	2	0
8	(Russia) N Petrova	6	6

Semifinals
Q	(Belgium) K Flipkens	4	2
8	(Russia) N Petrova	6	6

=== Bottom half ===
First round
7/WC	(Serbia) J Janković	2	6	4
(Sweden) S Arvidsson	6	3	6
WC	(Netherlands) A Rus	6	6
(France) P Parmentier	3	4
Q	(Poland) U Radwańska	4	6	6
(Kazakhstan) K Pervak	6	1	4
(Belarus) O Govortsova	6	1	1
4	(Italy) F Pennetta	2	6	6
5	(Russia) M Kirilenko	4	6	5
(Italy) F Schiavone	6	3	7
(Czech Republic) I Benešová	4	1
(Romania) I-C Begu	6	6
(Switzerland) R Oprandi	7^{7}	2	3
(Belgium) K Clijsters	6^{5}	6	6
(Ukraine) K Bondarenko	5	6	6
2	(Italy) S Errani	7	3	4

Second round
(Sweden) S Arvidsson	6	6
WC	(Netherlands) A Rus	4	1
Q	(Poland) U Radwańska	6	6
4	(Italy) F Pennetta	1	1
(Italy) F Schiavone	6	2	7^{10}
(Romania) I-C Begu	2	6	6^{8}
(Belgium) K Clijsters	6	6
(Ukraine) K Bondarenko	2	1

Quarterfinals
(Sweden) S Arvidsson	2	6^{3}
Q	(Poland) U Radwańska	6	7^{7}
(Italy) F Schiavone	3	6^{7}
(Belgium) K Clijsters	6	7^{9}

Semifinals
Q	(Poland) U Radwańska	w/o
(Belgium) K Clijsters

== Qualifying ==
=== Seeds ===
1. (Poland) Urszula Radwańska (qualified)
2. (Russia) Nina Bratchikova (qualifying competition)
3. (Uzbekistan) Akgul Amanmuradova (qualified)
4. (Australia) Anastasia Rodionova (first round)
5. (Ukraine) Yuliya Beygelzimer (qualifying competition)
6. (Spain) Arantxa Parra Santonja (qualifying competition)
7. (Netherlands) Richèl Hogenkamp (first round)
8. (Belgium) Kirsten Flipkens (qualified)

=== Qualifiers ===
1. (Poland) Urszula Radwańska
2. (Belgium) Kirsten Flipkens
3. (Uzbekistan) Akgul Amanmuradova
4. (Russia) Daria Gavrilova

=== Draw ===
==== First qualifier ====
First round
1	(Poland) Urszula Radwańska	6	6
WC	(Switzerland) Belinda Bencic	2	3
(France) Audrey Bergot	6	6
7	(Netherlands) Richèl Hogenkamp	4	2

Qualifying competition
1	(Poland) Urszula Radwańska	6	6
(France) Audrey Bergot	3	4

==== Second qualifier ====
First round
2	(Russia) Nina Bratchikova	4	7	6
(Belgium) Alison Van Uytvanck	6	5	3
(Australia) Karolina Wlodarczak	3	4
8	(Belgium) Kirsten Flipkens	6	6

Qualifying competition
2	(Russia) Nina Bratchikova	5	2
8	(Belgium) Kirsten Flipkens	7	6

==== Third qualifier ====
First round
3	(Uzbekistan) Akgul Amanmuradova	6	6
WC	(Netherlands) Indy de Vroome	4	1
(Canada) Eugenie Bouchard	3	4
6	(Spain) Arantxa Parra Santonja	6	6

Qualifying competition
3	(Uzbekistan) Akgul Amanmuradova	6	6
6	(Spain) Arantxa Parra Santonja	4	2

==== Fourth qualifier ====
First round
4	(Australia) Anastasia Rodionova	6^{4}	3^{r}
(Russia) Daria Gavrilova	7^{7}	5
(Germany) Nicola Geuer	2	1
5	(Ukraine) Yuliya Beygelzimer	6	6

Qualifying competition
(Russia) Daria Gavrilova	7^{7}	6
5	(Ukraine) Yuliya Beygelzimer	6^{4}	4
