= 2013 Topshelf Open – Men's doubles =

Men's doubles
- 2013 Topshelf Open

Final
- Champions: (Belarus) Max Mirnyi (Romania) Horia Tecău
- Runners-up: (Germany) Andre Begemann (Germany) Martin Emmrich
- Score: 6–3, 7–6^{(7–4)}

Events
Singles	men	women
Doubles	men	women
← 2012 ·	Topshelf Open	· 2014 →

Robert Lindstedt and Horia Tecău were the defending champions but Lindstedt decided not to participate.
Tecău plays alongside Max Mirnyi and won the title beating in the final Andre Begemann and Martin Emmrich, 6–3, 7–6^{(7–4)}.

== Seeds ==
1. (Pakistan) Aisam-ul-Haq Qureshi / (Netherlands) Jean-Julien Rojer (semifinals)
2. (Belarus) Max Mirnyi / (Romania) Horia Tecău (champions)
3. (Mexico) Santiago González / (United States) Scott Lipsky (first round)
4. (France) Michaël Llodra / (France) Nicolas Mahut (quarterfinals)

== Draw ==
=== Key ===
- Q = Qualifier
- WC = Wild card
- LL = Lucky loser
- Alt = Alternate
- SE = Special exempt
- PR = Protected ranking
- ITF = ITF entry
- JE = Junior exempt
- w/o = Walkover
- r = Retired
- d = Defaulted
- SR = Special ranking

=== Draw ===
First round
1	(Pakistan) A-u-H Qureshi (Netherlands) J-J Rojer	6	7
Alt	(Russia) E Donskoy (Russia) A Kuznetsov	4	5
(Spain) R Bautista-Agut (Spain) D Gimeno-Traver	3	6	[12]
(Italy) P Lorenzi (France) B Paire	6	4	[14]
4	(France) M Llodra (France) N Mahut	6	6
(Sweden) J Brunström (South Africa) R Klaasen	1	4
(Germany) A Begemann (Germany) M Emmrich	6	7^{8}
(Philippines) TC Huey (United Kingdom) D Inglot	2	6^{6}
WC	(Belgium) D Goffin (Belgium) D Norman	3	4
(Romania) F Mergea (Slovakia) F Polášek	6	6
WC	(Netherlands) T de Bakker (Netherlands) J Huta Galung	7^{7}	6^{4}	[10]
3	(Mexico) S González (United States) S Lipsky	6^{4}	7^{7}	[8]
(Czech Republic) F Čermák (Slovakia) M Mertiňák	6^{3}	6^{5}
(Italy) D Bracciali (Israel) J Erlich	7^{7}	7^{7}
(Czech Republic) L Dlouhý (United States) R Ram	3	4
2	' (Belarus) M Mirnyi (Romania) H Tecău	6	6

Quarterfinals
1	(Pakistan) A-u-H Qureshi (Netherlands) J-J Rojer	w/o
(Italy) P Lorenzi (France) B Paire
4	(France) M Llodra (France) N Mahut	4	4
(Germany) A Begemann (Germany) M Emmrich	6	6
(Romania) F Mergea (Slovakia) F Polášek	6	4	[8]
WC	(Netherlands) T de Bakker (Netherlands) J Huta Galung	3	6	[10]
(Italy) D Bracciali (Israel) J Erlich	4	3
2	(Belarus) M Mirnyi (Romania) H Tecău	6	6

Semifinals
1	(Pakistan) A-u-H Qureshi (Netherlands) J-J Rojer	7^{7}	6^{7}	[4]
(Germany) A Begemann (Germany) M Emmrich	6^{2}	7^{9}	[10]
WC	(Netherlands) T de Bakker (Netherlands) J Huta Galung	6^{4}	6^{3}
2	(Belarus) M Mirnyi (Romania) H Tecău	7^{7}	7^{7}

Final
(Germany) A Begemann (Germany) M Emmrich	3	6^{4}
2	(Belarus) M Mirnyi (Romania) H Tecău	6	7^{7}
