= 2014 Topshelf Open =

- Date: 15–21 June
- Edition: 25th
- Category: World Tour 250 series (ATP); Internat. tournaments (WTA)
- Draw: 32S / 16D; 32S / 16D
- Prize money: €426,605 $250,000
- Surface: Grass
- Location: Rosmalen, 's-Hertogenbosch, Netherlands

Champions

Men's singles
- (Spain) Roberto Bautista Agut

Women's singles
- (United States) CoCo Vandeweghe

Men's doubles
- (Netherlands) Jean-Julien Rojer / (Romania) Horia Tecău

Women's doubles
- (New Zealand) Marina Erakovic / (Spain) Arantxa Parra Santonja
- Topshelf Open

The 2014 Topshelf Open was a tennis tournament played on outdoor grass courts. It was the 25th edition of the Rosmalen Grass Court Championships, and was part of the 250 Series of the 2014 ATP World Tour, and of the WTA International tournaments of the 2014 WTA Tour. Both the men's and the women's events took place at the Autotron park in Rosmalen, 's-Hertogenbosch, Netherlands, from 15 June until 21 June 2014. Roberto Bautista Agut and CoCo Vandeweghe won the singles titles.

== Finals ==
=== Men's singles ===
- (Spain) Roberto Bautista Agut defeated (Germany) Benjamin Becker, 2–6, 7–6^{(7–2)}, 6–4

=== Women's singles ===
- (United States) CoCo Vandeweghe defeated (China) Zheng Jie, 6–2, 6–4

=== Men's doubles ===
- (Netherlands) Jean-Julien Rojer / (Romania) Horia Tecău defeated (Mexico) Santiago González / (United States) Scott Lipsky, 6–3, 7–6^{(7–3)}

=== Women's doubles ===
- (New Zealand) Marina Erakovic / (Spain) Arantxa Parra Santonja defeated (Netherlands) Michaëlla Krajicek / (France) Kristina Mladenovic, 0–6, 7–6^{(7–5)}, [10–8]

== Points and prize money ==
=== Point distribution ===
Event	W	F	SF	QF	Round of 16	Round of 32	Q	Q3	Q2	Q1
Men's singles	250	150	90	45	20	0	12	6	0	0
Men's doubles	250	150	90	45	0	—N/a	—N/a	—N/a	—N/a	—N/a
Women's singles	280	180	110	60	30	1	18	14	10	1
Women's doubles	280	180	110	60	1	—N/a	—N/a	—N/a	—N/a	—N/a

=== Prize money ===
Event	W	F	SF	QF	Round of 16	Round of 32	Q3	Q2
Men's singles	€73,350	€38,630	€20,930	€11,920	€7,025	€4,160	€710	€340
Women's singles	€34,677	€17,258	€9,274	€5,000	€2,758	€1,790	€1,036	€605
Men's doubles	€23,500	€12,350	€6,690	€3,830	€2,240	—N/a	—N/a	—N/a
Women's doubles	€9,919	€5,161	€2,770	€1,468	€774	—N/a	—N/a	—N/a

== ATP singles main-draw entrants ==
=== Seeds ===
Country	Player	Rank^{1}	Seed
~~ESP~~	~~David Ferrer~~	~~7~~	~~1~~
ESP	Fernando Verdasco	23	2
ESP	Roberto Bautista Agut	28	3
ESP	Marcel Granollers	30	4
RUS	Dmitry Tursunov	32	5
CAN	Vasek Pospisil	35	6
FRA	Nicolas Mahut	40	7
AUT	Jürgen Melzer	51	8

- ^{1} Rankings are as of 9 June 2014.

=== Other entrants ===
The following players received wildcards into the main draw:

- (Netherlands) Thiemo de Bakker
- (Belgium) Kimmer Coppejans
- (Netherlands) Jesse Huta Galung

The following players received entry from the qualifying draw:

- (Slovakia) Lukáš Lacko
- (France) Adrian Mannarino
- (Croatia) Mate Pavić
- (Portugal) João Sousa

The following player received entry as a lucky loser:

- (Italy) Paolo Lorenzi

=== Withdrawals ===
Before the tournament

- (Spain) David Ferrer (virus)
- (Poland) Łukasz Kubot
- (Argentina) Leonardo Mayer

During the tournament

- (Russia) Dmitry Tursunov

== ATP doubles main-draw entrants ==
=== Seeds ===
Country	Player	Country	Player	Rank^{1}	Seed
NED	Jean-Julien Rojer	ROU	Horia Tecău	48	1
USA	Eric Butorac	RSA	Raven Klaasen	56	2
ESP	Marcel Granollers	AUT	Jürgen Melzer	62	3
MEX	Santiago González	USA	Scott Lipsky	76	4

- ^{1} Rankings are as of 9 June 2014.

=== Other entrants ===
The following pairs received wildcards into the doubles main draw:

- (Germany) Dustin Brown / (Finland) Henri Kontinen
- (Netherlands) Thiemo de Bakker / (Netherlands) Igor Sijsling

The following pairs received entry as alternates:

- (Netherlands) Stephan Fransen / (Netherlands) Wesley Koolhof
- (Portugal) João Sousa / (Germany) Jan-Lennard Struff

=== Withdrawals ===
Before the tournament

- (France) Benoît Paire (knee injury)

== WTA singles main-draw entrants ==
=== Seeds ===
Country	Player	Rank^{1}	Seed
ROU	Simona Halep	3	1
SVK	Dominika Cibulková	10	2
CAN	Eugenie Bouchard	12	3
ESP	Carla Suárez Navarro	15	4
GER	Andrea Petkovic	20	5
BEL	Kirsten Flipkens	25	6
ESP	Garbiñe Muguruza	27	7
CZE	Klára Koukalová	33	8

- ^{1} Rankings are as of 9 June 2014.

=== Other entrants ===
The following players received wildcards into the main draw:

- (Netherlands) Lesley Kerkhove
- (Netherlands) Michaëlla Krajicek
- (Belgium) An-Sophie Mestach

The following players received entry from the qualifying draw:

- (Germany) Mona Barthel
- (Israel) Julia Glushko
- (Belarus) Olga Govortsova
- (United States) CoCo Vandeweghe

=== Withdrawals ===
Before the tournament

- (Italy) Karin Knapp → replaced by Yaroslava Shvedova
- (Switzerland) Romina Oprandi → replaced by Zheng Saisai

=== Retirements ===
- (Romania) Simona Halep (thoracic spine injury)
- (United States) Vania King (thoracic spine injury)
- (Spain) Carla Suárez Navarro (lower back injury)

== WTA doubles main-draw entrants ==
=== Seeds ===
Country	Player	Country	Player	Rank^{1}	Seed
CZE	Andrea Hlaváčková	CHN	Zheng Jie	37	1
ESP	Anabel Medina Garrigues	KAZ	Yaroslava Shvedova	46	2
NED	Michaëlla Krajicek	FRA	Kristina Mladenovic	65	3
NZL	Marina Erakovic	ESP	Arantxa Parra Santonja	73	4

- ^{1} Rankings are as of 9 June 2014.

=== Other entrants ===
The following pair received a wildcard into the doubles main draw:

- (Netherlands) Demi Schuurs / (Belgium) Alison Van Uytvanck
