= Rosmalen Grass Court Championships =

Coordinates: 51.709°N 5.419°E

Libéma Open
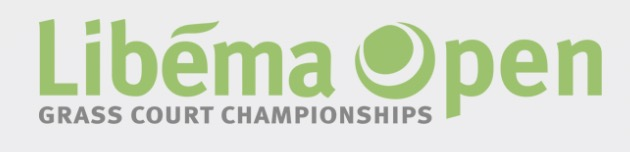

Tournament information
- Event name: Libéma Open Grass Court Championships (2018-)
- Founded: 1990; 36 years ago
- Location: Rosmalen, 's-Hertogenbosch; Netherlands
- Venue: Autotron 's-Hertogenbosch
- Surface: Grass
- Website: libema-open.nl

Current champions (2026)
- Men's singles: (Poland) Kamil Majchrzak
- Women's singles: (United States) Robin Montgomery
- Men's doubles: (Netherlands) Sander Arends (Netherlands) David Pel
- Women's doubles: (Japan) Shuko Aoyama (Chinese Taipei) Liang En-shuo
ATP Tour
- Category: ATP World Series (1990–1995); ATP International Series (2001–2008); ATP World Tour 250 series (2009–current)
- Draw: 28S / 16Q / 16D
- Prize money: €723,435 (2026)
WTA Tour
- Category: WTA Tier III (1996–2008); WTA International (2009–2020); WTA 250 (2021–current)
- Draw: 32S / 24Q / 16D
- Prize money: €246,388 (2026)

The Rosmalen Open, called the Libéma Open (sponsored by Libéma) is a professional tennis tournament held in the town of Rosmalen, on the outskirts of the city of 's-Hertogenbosch (Den Bosch) in the Netherlands. The men's and women's tennis matches are played on grass courts at the Autotron event venue. It is classified as an ATP 250 event on the ATP Tour and a WTA 250 event on the WTA Tour.

It was formerly known as the Continental Grass Court Championships, Heineken Trophy, Ordina Open, UNICEF Open, Topshelf Open and RICOH Open.

In 1989 a two-group round robin invitational tournament with eight players was organized in Rosmalen which was won by Miloslav Mečíř. The next year, 1990, the tournament became part of the newly founded ATP Tour and was officially called the Continental Grass Court Championships. At the time of its founding it was the only grass court event held in continental Europe. (Note: Since 1993 another continental grass court tournament, the Gerry Weber Open, is held in Halle, Germany.) The tournament is used by tennis pros as a preparation for the Wimbledon Championships and was held the week prior to Wimbledon until 2014. From 2015 onwards it is held the week following the French Open. In 1996, a women's singles and doubles event dubbed Wilkinson Championships was added to the tournament.

== Past finals ==
=== Men's singles ===
Year	Champion	Runner-up	Score
↓ ATP Tour 250 (Note: Known as World Series from 1990 till 1999 and International Series from 2000 till 2008.) ↓
1990	(Israel) Amos Mansdorf	(Soviet Union) Alexander Volkov	6–3, 7–6
1991	(Germany) Christian Saceanu	(Netherlands) Michiel Schapers	6–1, 3–6, 7–5
1992	(Germany) Michael Stich	(United States) Jonathan Stark	6–4, 7–5
1993	(France) Arnaud Boetsch	(Australia) Wally Masur	3–6, 6–3, 6–3
1994	(Netherlands) Richard Krajicek	(Germany) Karsten Braasch	6–3, 6–4
1995	(Slovakia) Karol Kučera	(Sweden) Anders Järryd	7–6^{(9–7)}, 7–6^{(7–4)}
1996	(United States) Richey Reneberg	(France) Stephane Simian	6–4, 6–0
1997	(Netherlands) Richard Krajicek (2)	(France) Guillaume Raoux	6–4, 7–6^{(9–7)}
1998	(Australia) Patrick Rafter	(Czech Republic) Martin Damm	7–6^{(7–2)}, 6–2
1999	(Australia) Patrick Rafter (2)	(Romania) Andrei Pavel	3–6, 7–6^{(9–7)}, 6–4
2000	(Australia) Patrick Rafter (3)	(France) Nicolas Escudé	6–1, 6–3
2001	(Australia) Lleyton Hewitt	(Argentina) Guillermo Cañas	6–3, 6–4
2002	(Netherlands) Sjeng Schalken	(France) Arnaud Clément	3–6, 6–3, 6–2
2003	(Netherlands) Sjeng Schalken (2)	(France) Arnaud Clément	6–3, 6–4
2004	(France) Michaël Llodra	(Argentina) Guillermo Coria	6–3, 6–4
2005	(Croatia) Mario Ančić	(France) Michaël Llodra	7–5, 6–4
2006	(Croatia) Mario Ančić (2)	(Czech Republic) Jan Hernych	6–0, 5–7, 7–5
2007	(Croatia) Ivan Ljubičić	(Netherlands) Peter Wessels	7–6^{(7–5)}, 4–6, 7–6^{(7–4)}
2008	(Spain) David Ferrer	(France) Marc Gicquel	6–4, 6–2
2009	(Germany) Benjamin Becker	(Netherlands) Raemon Sluiter	7–5, 6–3
2010	(Ukraine) Sergiy Stakhovsky	(Serbia) Janko Tipsarević	6–3, 6–0
2011	(Russia) Dmitry Tursunov	(Croatia) Ivan Dodig	6–3, 6–2
2012	(Spain) David Ferrer (2)	(Germany) Philipp Petzschner	6–3, 6–4
2013	(France) Nicolas Mahut	(Switzerland) Stanislas Wawrinka	6–3, 6–4
2014	(Spain) Roberto Bautista Agut	(Germany) Benjamin Becker	2–6, 7–6^{(7–2)}, 6–4
2015	(France) Nicolas Mahut (2)	(Belgium) David Goffin	7–6^{(7–1)}, 6–1
2016	(France) Nicolas Mahut (3)	(Luxembourg) Gilles Müller	6–4, 6–4
2017	(Luxembourg) Gilles Müller	(Croatia) Ivo Karlović	7–6^{(7–5)}, 7–6^{(7–4)}
2018	(France) Richard Gasquet	(France) Jérémy Chardy	6–3, 7–6^{(7–5)}
2019	(France) Adrian Mannarino	(Australia) Jordan Thompson	7–6^{(9–7)}, 6–3
2020– 2021	Not held due to COVID-19 pandemic		
2022	(Netherlands) Tim van Rijthoven	(Note: Competed under no nationality due to the Russian invasion of Ukraine.) Daniil Medvedev	6–4, 6–1
2023	(Netherlands) Tallon Griekspoor	(Australia) Jordan Thompson	6–7^{(4–7)}, 7–6^{(7–3)}, 6–3
2024	(Australia) Alex de Minaur	(United States) Sebastian Korda	6–2, 6–4
2025	(Canada) Gabriel Diallo	(Belgium) Zizou Bergs	7–5, 7–6^{(10–8)}
2026	(Poland) Kamil Majchrzak	(Australia) Alex de Minaur	6–3, 2–6, 7–6^{(7–5)}

=== Women's singles ===
Year	Champion	Runner-up	Score
1996	(Germany) Anke Huber	(Czech Republic) Helena Suková	6–4, 7–6^{(7–2)}
1997	(Romania) Ruxandra Dragomir	(Netherlands) Miriam Oremans	5–7, 6–2, 6–4
1998	(France) Julie Halard-Decugis	(Netherlands) Miriam Oremans	6–3, 6–4
1999	(Puerto Rico) Kristina Brandi	(Croatia) Silvija Talaja	6–0, 3–6, 6–1
2000	(Switzerland) Martina Hingis	(Romania) Ruxandra Dragomir	6–2, 3–0 ret.
2001	(Belgium) Justine Henin	(Belgium) Kim Clijsters	6–4, 3–6, 6–3
2002	(Greece) Eleni Daniilidou	(Russia) Elena Dementieva	3–6, 6–2, 6–3
2003	(Belgium) Kim Clijsters	(Belgium) Justine Henin-Hardenne	6–7^{(4–7)}, 3–0 ret.
2004	(France) Mary Pierce	(Czech Republic) Klára Koukalová	7–6^{(8–6)}, 6–2
2005	(Czech Republic) Klára Koukalová	(Czech Republic) Lucie Šafářová	3–6, 6–2, 6–2
2006	(Netherlands) Michaëlla Krajicek	(Russia) Dinara Safina	6–3, 6–4
2007	(Russia) Anna Chakvetadze	(Serbia) Jelena Janković	7–6^{(7–2)}, 3–6, 6–3
2008	(Thailand) Tamarine Tanasugarn	(Russia) Dinara Safina	7–5, 6–3
2009	(Thailand) Tamarine Tanasugarn (2)	(Belgium) Yanina Wickmayer	6–3, 7–5
2010	(Belgium) Justine Henin (2)	(Germany) Andrea Petkovic	3–6, 6–3, 6–4
2011	(Italy) Roberta Vinci	(Australia) Jelena Dokić	6–7^{(7–9)}, 6–3, 7–5
2012	(Russia) Nadia Petrova	(Poland) Urszula Radwańska	6–4, 6–3
2013	(Romania) Simona Halep	(Belgium) Kirsten Flipkens	6–4, 6–2
2014	(United States) Coco Vandeweghe	(China) Zheng Jie	6–2, 6–4
2015	(Italy) Camila Giorgi	(Switzerland) Belinda Bencic	7–5, 6–3
2016	(United States) Coco Vandeweghe (2)	(France) Kristina Mladenovic	7–5, 7–5
2017	(Estonia) Anett Kontaveit	(Russia) Natalia Vikhlyantseva	6–2, 6–3
2018	(Serbia) Aleksandra Krunić	(Belgium) Kirsten Flipkens	6–7^{(0–7)}, 7–5, 6–1
2019	(United States) Alison Riske	(Netherlands) Kiki Bertens	0–6, 7–6^{(7–3)}, 7–5
2020– 2021	Not held due to COVID-19 pandemic		
2022	Ekaterina Alexandrova	Aryna Sabalenka	7–5, 6–0
2023	Ekaterina Alexandrova (2)	Veronika Kudermetova	4–6, 6–4, 7–6^{(7–3)}
2024	Liudmila Samsonova	(Canada) Bianca Andreescu	4–6, 6–3, 7–5
2025	(Belgium) Elise Mertens	(Romania) Elena-Gabriela Ruse	6–3, 7–6^{(7–4)}
2026	(United States) Robin Montgomery	(Czech Republic) Barbora Krejčíková	Walkover

=== Men's doubles ===
Year	Champions	Runners-up	Score
↓ ATP Tour 250 ↓
1990	(Switzerland) Jakob Hlasek (Germany) Michael Stich	(United States) Jim Grabb (United States) Patrick McEnroe	7–6, 6–3
1991	(Netherlands) Hendrik Jan Davids (Netherlands) Paul Haarhuis	(Netherlands) Richard Krajicek (Netherlands) Jan Siemerink	6–3, 7–6
1992	(United States) Jim Grabb (United States) Richey Reneberg	(United States) John McEnroe (Germany) Michael Stich	6–4, 6–7, 6–4
1993	(United States) Patrick McEnroe (United States) Jonathan Stark	(South Africa) David Adams (Russia) Andrei Olhovskiy	7–6, 1–6, 6–4
1994	(Netherlands) Stephen Noteboom (Netherlands) Fernon Wibier	(Sweden) Peter Nyborg (Italy) Diego Nargiso	6–3, 1–6, 7–6
1995	(Netherlands) Richard Krajicek (Netherlands) Jan Siemerink	(Netherlands) Hendrik Jan Davids (Russia) Andrei Olhovskiy	7–5, 6–3
1996	(Australia) Paul Kilderry (Czech Republic) Pavel Vízner	(Sweden) Anders Järryd (Canada) Daniel Nestor	7–5, 6–3
1997	(Netherlands) Jacco Eltingh (Netherlands) Paul Haarhuis (2)	(United States) Trevor Kronemann (Australia) David Macpherson	6–4, 7–5
1998	(France) Guillaume Raoux (Netherlands) Jan Siemerink (2)	(Australia) Joshua Eagle (Australia) Andrew Florent	7–6, 6–2
1999	Not held due to rain		
2000	(Czech Republic) Martin Damm (Czech Republic) Cyril Suk	(Netherlands) Paul Haarhuis (Australia) Sandon Stolle	6–4, 6–7^{(5–7)}, 7–6^{(7–5)}
2001	(Netherlands) Paul Haarhuis (3) (Netherlands) Sjeng Schalken	(Czech Republic) Martin Damm (Czech Republic) Cyril Suk	6–4, 6–4
2002	(Czech Republic) Martin Damm (2) (Czech Republic) Cyril Suk (2)	(Netherlands) Paul Haarhuis (United States) Brian MacPhie	7–6^{(8–6)}, 6–7^{(6–8)}, 6–4
2003	(Czech Republic) Martin Damm (3) (Czech Republic) Cyril Suk (3)	(United States) Donald Johnson (India) Leander Paes	7–5, 7–6^{(7–4)}
2004	(Czech Republic) Martin Damm (4) (Czech Republic) Cyril Suk (4)	(Germany) Lars Burgsmüller (Czech Republic) Jan Vacek	6–3, 6–7^{(7–9)}, 6–3
2005	(Czech Republic) Cyril Suk (5) (Czech Republic) Pavel Vízner (2)	(Czech Republic) Tomáš Cibulec (Czech Republic) Leoš Friedl	6–3, 6–4
2006	(Czech Republic) Martin Damm (5) (India) Leander Paes	(France) Arnaud Clément (South Africa) Chris Haggard	6–1, 7–6^{(7–3)}
2007	(South Africa) Jeff Coetzee (Netherlands) Rogier Wassen	(Czech Republic) Martin Damm (India) Leander Paes	3–6, 7–6^{(7–5)}, [12–10]
2008	(Croatia) Mario Ančić (Austria) Jürgen Melzer	(India) Mahesh Bhupathi (India) Leander Paes	7–6^{(7–5)}, 6–3
2009	(South Africa) Wesley Moodie (Belgium) Dick Norman	(Sweden) Johan Brunström (Netherlands Antilles) Jean-Julien Rojer	7–6^{(7–3)}, 6–7^{(8–10)}, [10–5]
2010	(Sweden) Robert Lindstedt (Romania) Horia Tecău	(Czech Republic) Lukáš Dlouhý (India) Leander Paes	1–6, 7–5, [10–7]
2011	(Italy) Daniele Bracciali (Czech Republic) František Čermák	(Sweden) Robert Lindstedt (Romania) Horia Tecău	6–3, 2–6, [10–8]
2012	(Sweden) Robert Lindstedt (2) (Romania) Horia Tecău (2)	(Colombia) Juan Sebastián Cabal (Russia) Dmitry Tursunov	6–3, 7–6^{(7–1)}
2013	(Belarus) Max Mirnyi (Romania) Horia Tecău (3)	(Germany) Andre Begemann (Germany) Martin Emmrich	6–3, 7–6^{(7–4)}
2014	(Netherlands) Jean-Julien Rojer (Romania) Horia Tecău (4)	(Mexico) Santiago González (United States) Scott Lipsky	6–3, 7–6^{(7–3)}
2015	(Croatia) Ivo Karlović (Poland) Łukasz Kubot	(France) Pierre-Hugues Herbert (France) Nicolas Mahut	6–2, 7–6^{(11–9)}
2016	(Croatia) Mate Pavić (New Zealand) Michael Venus	(United Kingdom) Dominic Inglot (South Africa) Raven Klaasen	3–6, 6–3, [11–9]
2017	(Poland) Łukasz Kubot (2) (Brazil) Marcelo Melo	(South Africa) Raven Klaasen (United States) Rajeev Ram	6–3, 6–4
2018	(United Kingdom) Dominic Inglot (Croatia) Franko Škugor	(South Africa) Raven Klaasen (New Zealand) Michael Venus	7–6^{(7–3)}, 7–5
2019	(United Kingdom) Dominic Inglot (2) (United States) Austin Krajicek	(New Zealand) Marcus Daniell (Netherlands) Wesley Koolhof	6–4, 4–6, [10–4]
2020– 2021	not held due to COVID-19 pandemic		
2022	(Netherlands) Wesley Koolhof (United Kingdom) Neal Skupski	(Australia) Matthew Ebden (Australia) Max Purcell	6–4, 5–7, [10–6]
2023	(Netherlands) Wesley Koolhof (2) (United Kingdom) Neal Skupski (2)	(Ecuador) Gonzalo Escobar (Kazakhstan) Aleksandr Nedovyesov	7–6^{(7–1)}, 6–2
2024	(United States) Nathaniel Lammons (United States) Jackson Withrow	(Netherlands) Wesley Koolhof (Croatia) Nikola Mektić	7–6^{(7–5)}, 7–6^{(7–3)}
2025	(Australia) Matthew Ebden (Australia) Jordan Thompson	(United Kingdom) Julian Cash (United Kingdom) Lloyd Glasspool	6–4, 3–6, [10–7]
2026	(Netherlands) Sander Arends (Netherlands) David Pel	(Belgium) Zizou Bergs (France) Arthur Rinderknech	7–6^{(8–6)}, 7–6^{(7–5)}

=== Women's doubles ===
Year	Champions	Runners-up	Score
1996	(Latvia) Larisa Savchenko Neiland (Netherlands) Brenda Schultz-McCarthy	(Netherlands) Kristie Boogert (Czech Republic) Helena Suková	6–4, 7–6^{(9–7)}
1997	(Czech Republic) Eva Melicharová (Czech Republic) Helena Vildová	(Slovakia) Karina Habšudová (Argentina) Florencia Labat	6–3, 7–6^{(8–6)}
1998	(Belgium) Sabine Appelmans (Netherlands) Miriam Oremans	(Romania) Cătălina Cristea (Czech Republic) Eva Melicharová	6–7^{(4–7)}, 7–6^{(8–6)}, 7–6^{(7–5)}
1999	(Italy) Silvia Farina (Italy) Rita Grande	(Zimbabwe) Cara Black (Netherlands) Kristie Boogert	7–5, 7–6^{(7–2)}
2000	(United States) Erika deLone (Australia) Nicole Pratt	(Australia) Catherine Barclay (Slovakia) Karina Habšudová	7–6^{(8–6)}, 4–3 ret.
2001	(Romania) Ruxandra Dragomir Ilie (Russia) Nadia Petrova	(Belgium) Kim Clijsters (Netherlands) Miriam Oremans	7–6^{(7–5)}, 6–7^{(5–7)}, 6–4
2002	(Australia) Catherine Barclay (Germany) Martina Müller	(Germany) Bianka Lamade (Bulgaria) Magdalena Maleeva	6–4, 7–5
2003	(Russia) Elena Dementieva (Russia) Lina Krasnoroutskaya	(France) Mary Pierce (Russia) Nadia Petrova	2–6, 6–3, 6–4
2004	(Australia) Lisa McShea (Venezuela) Milagros Sequera	(Croatia) Jelena Kostanić (Luxembourg) Claudine Schaul	7–6^{(7–3)}, 6–3
2005	(Spain) Anabel Medina Garrigues (Russia) Dinara Safina	(Czech Republic) Iveta Benešová (Spain) Nuria Llagostera Vives	6–4, 2–6, 7–6^{(13–11)}
2006	(China) Yan Zi (China) Zheng Jie	(Serbia) Ana Ivanovic (Russia) Maria Kirilenko	3–6, 6–2, 6–2
2007	(Chinese Taipei) Chan Yung-jan (Chinese Taipei) Chuang Chia-jung	(Spain) Anabel Medina Garrigues (Spain) Virginia Ruano Pascual	7–5, 6–2
2008	(New Zealand) Marina Erakovic (Netherlands) Michaëlla Krajicek	(Latvia) Līga Dekmeijere (Germany) Angelique Kerber	6–3, 6–2
2009	(Italy) Sara Errani (Italy) Flavia Pennetta	(Netherlands) Michaëlla Krajicek (Belgium) Yanina Wickmayer	6–4, 5–7, [13–11]
2010	(Russia) Alla Kudryavtseva (Australia) Anastasia Rodionova	(United States) Vania King (Kazakhstan) Yaroslava Shvedova	3–6, 6–3, [10–6]
2011	(Czech Republic) Barbora Záhlavová-Strýcová (Czech Republic) Klára Zakopalová	(Slovakia) Dominika Cibulková (Italy) Flavia Pennetta	1–6, 6–4, [10–7]
2012	(Italy) Sara Errani (2) (Italy) Roberta Vinci	(Russia) Maria Kirilenko (Russia) Nadia Petrova	6–4, 3–6, [11–9]
2013	(Romania) Irina-Camelia Begu (Spain) Anabel Medina Garrigues (2)	(Slovakia) Dominika Cibulková (Spain) Arantxa Parra Santonja	4–6, 7–6^{(7–3)}, [11–9]
2014	(New Zealand) Marina Erakovic (2) (Spain) Arantxa Parra Santonja	(Netherlands) Michaëlla Krajicek (France) Kristina Mladenovic	0–6, 7–6^{(7–5)}, [10–8]
2015	(United States) Asia Muhammad (Germany) Laura Siegemund	(Serbia) Jelena Janković (Russia) Anastasia Pavlyuchenkova	6–3, 7–5
2016	(Georgia (country)) Oksana Kalashnikova (Kazakhstan) Yaroslava Shvedova	(Switzerland) Xenia Knoll (Serbia) Aleksandra Krunić	6–1, 6–1
2017	(Slovakia) Dominika Cibulková (Belgium) Kirsten Flipkens	(Netherlands) Kiki Bertens (Netherlands) Demi Schuurs	4–6, 6–4, [10–6]
2018	(Belgium) Elise Mertens (Netherlands) Demi Schuurs	(Netherlands) Kiki Bertens (Belgium) Kirsten Flipkens	3–3 ret.
2019	(Japan) Shuko Aoyama (Serbia) Aleksandra Krunić	(Netherlands) Lesley Kerkhove (Netherlands) Bibiane Schoofs	7–5, 6–3
2020– 2021	not held due to COVID-19 pandemic		
2022	(Australia) Ellen Perez (Slovenia) Tamara Zidanšek	Veronika Kudermetova (Belgium) Elise Mertens	6–3, 5–7, [12–10]
2023	(Japan) Shuko Aoyama (2) (Japan) Ena Shibahara	(Slovakia) Viktória Hrunčáková (Slovakia) Tereza Mihalíková	6–3, 6–3
2024	(Estonia) Ingrid Neel (Netherlands) Bibiane Schoofs	(Slovakia) Tereza Mihalíková (United Kingdom) Olivia Nicholls	7–6^{(8–6)}, 6–3
2025	Irina Khromacheva (Hungary) Fanny Stollár	(United States) Nicole Melichar-Martinez; Liudmila Samsonova	7–5, 6–3
2026	(Japan) Shuko Aoyama (3) (Chinese Taipei) Liang En-shuo	(Estonia) Ingrid Neel (Mexico) Giuliana Olmos	6–2, 2–6, [10–7]
