= 2024 Libéma Open – Women's singles =

Women's singles
- 2024 Libéma Open

Final
- Champion: Liudmila Samsonova
- Runner-up: (Canada) Bianca Andreescu
- Score: 4–6, 6–3, 7–5

Details
- Draw: 32 (6 Q / 3 WC )
- Seeds: 8

Events
Singles	men	women
Doubles	men	women
← 2023 ·	Libéma Open	· 2025 →

Liudmila Samsonova defeated Bianca Andreescu in the final, 4–6, 6–3, 7–5 to win the women's singles tennis title at the 2024 Libéma Open.

Ekaterina Alexandrova was the two-time defending champion, but lost in the semifinals to Samsonova.

== Seeds ==
1. (United States) Jessica Pegula (second round)
2. Liudmila Samsonova (champion)
3. Ekaterina Alexandrova (semifinals)
4. (Belgium) Elise Mertens (first round)
5. Veronika Kudermetova (second round)
6. (China) Yuan Yue (second round)
7. (Croatia) Donna Vekić (second round)
8. (Poland) Magda Linette (first round)

== Draw ==
=== Key ===
- Q = Qualifier
- WC = Wild card
- LL = Lucky loser
- Alt = Alternate
- ITF = ITF entry
- PR = Protected ranking
- SR = Special ranking
- SE = Special exempt
- JE = Junior exempt
- JR = Junior Accelerator Programme entrant
- CO = College Accelerator Programme entrant
- NG = Next Gen Accelerator Program entrant
- w/o = Walkover
- r = Retired
- d = Defaulted

=== Finals ===
Semifinals
Q	(Hungary) Dalma Gálfi	4	2
WC	(Canada) Bianca Andreescu	6	6
3	Ekaterina Alexandrova	3	7^{7}	1
2	Liudmila Samsonova	6	6^{1}	6

Final
WC	(Canada) Bianca Andreescu	6	3	5
2	Liudmila Samsonova	4	6	7

=== Top half ===
First round
1	(United States) J Pegula	6	6
Q	A Sasnovich	2	2
PR	(Serbia) A Krunić	4	6	6
Q	(France) J Ponchet	6	2	1
Q	(Hungary) D Gálfi	6	6
(Netherlands) A Rus	0	3
(China) Z Bai	5	1
5	V Kudermetova	7	6
4	(Belgium) E Mertens	2	4
WC	(Japan) N Osaka	6	6
(United States) B Pera	6	2	4
WC	(Netherlands) S Lamens	4	6	6
WC	(Canada) B Andreescu	4	6	6
Q	(Netherlands) E Vedder	6	3	2
D Shnaider	6	4	3
6	(China) Y Yuan	1	6	6

Second round
1	(United States) J Pegula	6^{3}	7^{7}	4
PR	(Serbia) A Krunić	7^{7}	6^{3}	6
Q	(Hungary) D Gálfi	6	3	7
5	V Kudermetova	3	6	5
WC	(Japan) N Osaka	6	6
WC	(Netherlands) S Lamens	2	2
WC	(Canada) B Andreescu	6	6
6	(China) Y Yuan	4	4

Quarterfinals
PR	(Serbia) A Krunić	5	3
Q	(Hungary) D Gálfi	7	6
WC	(Japan) N Osaka	4	6	6^{3}
WC	(Canada) B Andreescu	6	3	7^{7}

Semifinals
Q	(Hungary) D Gálfi	4	2
WC	(Canada) B Andreescu	6	6

=== Bottom half ===
First round
8	(Poland) M Linette	7^{7}	3	5
Q	(United States) R Montgomery	6^{4}	6	7
(Denmark) C Tauson	4	7^{7}	4
(Germany) J Niemeier	6	6^{3}	6
A Blinkova	4	0
(United States) E Bektas	6	6
(Australia) Ar Rodionova	3	4
3	E Alexandrova	6	6
7	(Croatia) D Vekić	6	6
(Germany) T Korpatsch	1	3
(Belgium) G Minnen	6	6
(Spain) R Masarova	2	4
Q	(United States) E Mandlik	6^{4}	6	4
WC	(Switzerland) C Naef	7^{7}	1	6
PR	(Belgium) A Van Uytvanck	1	3
2	L Samsonova	6	6

Second round
Q	(United States) R Montgomery	6	6
(Germany) J Niemeier	3	3
(United States) E Bektas	5	4
3	E Alexandrova	7	6
7	(Croatia) D Vekić	1	6	5
(Belgium) G Minnen	6	0	7
WC	(Switzerland) C Naef	5	2
2	L Samsonova	7	6

Quarterfinals
Q	(United States) R Montgomery	4	3
3	E Alexandrova	6	6
(Belgium) G Minnen	4	5
2	L Samsonova	6	7

Semifinals
3	E Alexandrova	3	7^{7}	1
2	L Samsonova	6	6^{1}	6

== Qualifying ==
=== Seeds ===
1. Aliaksandra Sasnovich (qualified)
2. (United States) McCartney Kessler (qualifying competition)
3. (New Zealand) Lulu Sun (qualifying competition)
4. (Australia) Taylah Preston (qualifying competition)
5. (United States) Elizabeth Mandlik (qualified)
6. (Slovakia) Viktória Hrunčáková (first round)
7. (Germany) Eva Lys (qualifying competition, retired)
8. (Hungary) Dalma Gálfi (qualified)
9. (France) Jessika Ponchet (qualified)
10. (Turkey) Zeynep Sönmez (qualifying competition)
11. (United States) Robin Montgomery (qualified)
12. (Serbia) Natalija Stevanović (first round)

=== Qualifiers ===
1. Aliaksandra Sasnovich
2. (Hungary) Dalma Gálfi
3. (United States) Robin Montgomery
4. (France) Jessika Ponchet
5. (United States) Elizabeth Mandlik
6. (Netherlands) Eva Vedder

=== Qualifying draw ===
==== First qualifier ====
First round
1	Aliaksandra Sasnovich	6	6
WC	(Netherlands) Bibiane Schoofs	2	4
(Czech Republic) Tereza Martincová	6	6
12	(Serbia) Natalija Stevanović	2	4

Qualifying competition
1	Aliaksandra Sasnovich	7	7^{7}
(Czech Republic) Tereza Martincová	5	6^{5}

==== Second qualifier ====
First round
2	(United States) McCartney Kessler	4	6	6
(Netherlands) Anouk Koevermans	6	3	1
(Canada) Marina Stakusic	6	1	2
8	(Hungary) Dalma Gálfi	3	6	6

Qualifying competition
2	(United States) McCartney Kessler	3	6^{7}
8	(Hungary) Dalma Gálfi	6	7^{9}

==== Third qualifier ====
First round
3	(New Zealand) Lulu Sun	6	6
(Slovenia) Dalila Jakupović	4	1
WC	(Netherlands) Annelin Bakker	4	6	2
11	(United States) Robin Montgomery	6	3	6

Qualifying competition
3	(New Zealand) Lulu Sun	6^{4}	5
11	(United States) Robin Montgomery	7^{7}	7

==== Fourth qualifier ====
First round
4	(Australia) Taylah Preston	6	7^{7}
(Bulgaria) Isabella Shinikova	3	6^{4}
Jana Kolodynska	0	3
9	(France) Jessika Ponchet	6	6

Qualifying competition
4	(Australia) Taylah Preston	7^{11}	6^{5}	4
9	(France) Jessika Ponchet	6^{9}	7^{7}	6

==== Fifth qualifier ====
First round
5	(United States) Elizabeth Mandlik	3	6	6
(United States) Amanda Anisimova	6	3	2
WC	(Netherlands) Isis Louise van den Broek	6	2	1
10	(Turkey) Zeynep Sönmez	4	6	6

Qualifying competition
5	(United States) Elizabeth Mandlik	6	6
10	(Turkey) Zeynep Sönmez	1	4

==== Sixth qualifier ====
First round
6	(Slovakia) Viktória Hrunčáková	3	6^{5}
(Netherlands) Eva Vedder	6	7^{7}
WC	(Netherlands) Michaëlla Krajicek	2	6^{6}
7	(Germany) Eva Lys	6	7^{8}

Qualifying competition
(Netherlands) Eva Vedder	6	0
7	(Germany) Eva Lys	3	0^{r}
