= 2025 Libéma Open =

- Date: 9–15 June
- Edition: 34th
- Category: ATP Tour 250; WTA 250
- Draw: 28S / 16D (men); 32S / 16D (women)
- Prize money: €706,850 (men) €239,212 (women)
- Surface: Grass
- Location: Rosmalen, 's-Hertogenbosch, Netherlands

Champions

Men's singles
- (Canada) Gabriel Diallo

Women's singles
- (Belgium) Elise Mertens

Men's doubles
- (Australia) Matthew Ebden / (Australia) Jordan Thompson

Women's doubles
- Irina Khromacheva / (Hungary) Fanny Stollár
← 2024 ·	Rosmalen Grass Court Championships	· 2026 →

The 2025 Libéma Open was a professional tennis tournament played on outdoor grass courts at Autotron Rosmalen in Rosmalen, 's-Hertogenbosch, Netherlands from 9 to 15 June 2025. It was the 34th edition of the Rosmalen Grass Court Championships and was classified as an ATP 250 event on the 2025 ATP Tour and a WTA 250 event on the 2025 WTA Tour.

== Champions ==
=== Men's singles ===
- (Canada) Gabriel Diallo def. (Belgium) Zizou Bergs, 7−5, 7–6^{(10–8)}

=== Women's singles ===
- (Belgium) Elise Mertens def. (Romania) Elena-Gabriela Ruse, 6–3, 7–6^{(7–4)}

=== Men's doubles ===
- (Australia) Matthew Ebden / (Australia) Jordan Thompson def. (United Kingdom) Julian Cash / (United Kingdom) Lloyd Glasspool, 6–4, 3–6, [10–7]

=== Women's doubles ===
- Irina Khromacheva / (Hungary) Fanny Stollár def. (United States) Nicole Melichar-Martinez / Liudmila Samsonova, 7–5, 6–3

== ATP singles main draw entrants ==
=== Seeds ===
Country	Player	Rank^{1}	Seed
	Daniil Medvedev	11	1
FRA	Ugo Humbert	21	2
	Karen Khachanov	24	3
AUS	Alexei Popyrin	25	4
POL	Hubert Hurkacz	28	5
AUS	Jordan Thompson	40	6
POR	Nuno Borges	41	7
ITA	Luciano Darderi	45	8

- ^{1} Rankings are as of 26 May 2025.

=== Other entrants ===
The following players received wildcards into the main draw:

- (Netherlands) Jesper de Jong
- ~~(Netherlands) Botic van de Zandschulp~~
- (Finland) Otto Virtanen

The following player received entry under the ATP Next Gen programme for players aged under 20 and ranked in the top 350:

- (United States) Nishesh Basavareddy

The following players received entry from the qualifying draw:

- (Belgium) Alexander Blockx
- (United Kingdom) Dan Evans
- (Estonia) Mark Lajal
- (United States) Mackenzie McDonald

The following players received entry as lucky losers:

- (France) Adrian Mannarino
- (United States) Reilly Opelka

=== Withdrawals ===
- (Italy) Flavio Cobolli → replaced by (Serbia) Laslo Djere
- (Australia) Alex de Minaur → replaced by (Australia) Rinky Hijikata
- (France) Arthur Fils → replaced by (Argentina) Tomás Martín Etcheverry
- (United States) Marcos Giron → replaced by (Australia) Aleksandar Vukic
- (Netherlands) Tallon Griekspoor → replaced by (Australia) Christopher O'Connell
- (Serbia) Miomir Kecmanović → replaced by (Chile) Nicolás Jarry
- (United States) Sebastian Korda → replaced by (United States) Aleksandar Kovacevic
- (Chile) Alejandro Tabilo → replaced by (United States) Reilly Opelka
- (Netherlands) Botic van de Zandschulp → replaced by (France) Adrian Mannarino

== ATP doubles main draw entrants ==
=== Seeds ===
Country	Player	Country	Player	Rank^{1}	Seed
CRO	Nikola Mektić	NZL	Michael Venus	30	1
GBR	Julian Cash	GBR	Lloyd Glasspool	30	2
AUS	Matthew Ebden	AUS	Jordan Thompson	45	3
USA	Nathaniel Lammons	USA	Jackson Withrow	47	4

- ^{1} Rankings are as of 26 May 2025.

=== Other entrants ===
The following pairs received wildcards into the doubles main draw:

- (Netherlands) Matwé Middelkoop / (Netherlands) David Pel
- (Netherlands) Jean-Julien Rojer / (Netherlands) Bart Stevens

=== Withdrawals ===
- (Argentina) Guido Andreozzi / (France) Théo Arribagé → replaced by (France) Théo Arribagé / (Brazil) Marcelo Demoliner
- (Netherlands) Sander Arends / (United Kingdom) Luke Johnson → replaced by (Netherlands) Sander Arends / (France) Grégoire Jacq
- (Croatia) Ivan Dodig / (Serbia) Miomir Kecmanović → replaced by (Croatia) Ivan Dodig / (Netherlands) Sem Verbeek
- (Australia) Matthew Ebden / (Australia) John Peers → replaced by (Belgium) Zizou Bergs / (Netherlands) Jesper de Jong
- (Netherlands) Tallon Griekspoor / (Netherlands) Bart Stevens → replaced by (Colombia) Nicolás Barrientos / (India) Rithvik Choudary Bollipalli
- (France) Ugo Humbert / (France) Nicolas Mahut → replaced by (Canada) Gabriel Diallo / (France) Ugo Humbert
- (United States) Sebastian Korda / (Australia) Jordan Thompson → replaced by (Australia) Matthew Ebden / (Australia) Jordan Thompson
- (Monaco) Hugo Nys / (Czech Republic) Adam Pavlásek → replaced by (Czech Republic) Petr Nouza / (Czech Republic) Patrik Rikl
- (United Kingdom) Joe Salisbury / (United Kingdom) Neal Skupski → replaced by (Brazil) Fernando Romboli / (Australia) John-Patrick Smith

== WTA singles main draw entrants ==
=== Seeds ===
Country	Player	Rank^{1}	Seed
	Liudmila Samsonova	18	1
	Ekaterina Alexandrova	20	2
BEL	Elise Mertens	24	3
POL	Magda Linette	32	4
	Anastasia Potapova	37	5
CHN	Wang Xinyu	43	6
NZL	Lulu Sun	45	7
	Veronika Kudermetova	46	8

- ^{1} Rankings are as of 26 May 2024.

=== Other entrants ===
The following players received wildcards into the main draw:

- (Canada) Bianca Andreescu
- (Netherlands) Arianne Hartono
- (Netherlands) Anouk Koevermans
- (Netherlands) Anouck Vrancken Peeters

The following players received entry using a protected ranking into the singles main draw:

- (Latvia) Anastasija Sevastova

The following players received entry from the qualifying draw:

- (Georgia (country)) Mariam Bolkvadze
- (Canada) Carson Branstine
- (Chinese Taipei) Joanna Garland
- (Romania) Elena-Gabriela Ruse
- (Netherlands) Isis Louise van den Broek
- (Belgium) Yanina Wickmayer

The following player received entry as a lucky loser:

- (China) Yuan Yue

=== Withdrawals ===
- (Armenia) Elina Avanesyan → replaced by Anna Blinkova
- (Serbia) Olga Danilović → replaced by (United States) Bernarda Pera
- (Germany) Eva Lys → replaced by (Italy) Elisabetta Cocciaretto
- (Colombia) Camila Osorio → replaced by (China) Yuan Yue
- Anastasia Pavlyuchenkova → replaced by (Greece) Maria Sakkari
- (Ukraine) Dayana Yastremska → replaced by (Netherlands) Suzan Lamens

== WTA doubles main draw entrants ==
=== Seeds ===
Country	Player	Country	Player	Rank^{1}	Seed
	Veronika Kudermetova	BEL	Elise Mertens	30	1
	Irina Khromacheva	HUN	Fanny Stollár	67	2
USA	Nicole Melichar-Martinez		Liudmila Samsonova	73	3
JPN	Eri Hozumi	INA	Aldila Sutjiadi	88	4

- ^{1} Rankings are as of 26 May 2025.

=== Other entrants ===
The following pairs received wildcards into the doubles main draw:

- (Canada) Bianca Andreescu / (Canada) Carson Branstine
- (Netherlands) Suzan Lamens / (Netherlands) Sarah van Emst
