= 2025 Libéma Open – Men's doubles =

Men's doubles
- 2025 Libéma Open

Final
- Champions: (Australia) Matthew Ebden (Australia) Jordan Thompson
- Runners-up: (United Kingdom) Julian Cash (United Kingdom) Lloyd Glasspool
- Score: 6–4, 3–6, [10–7]

Events
| Singles | men | women |
| Doubles | men | women |
| ← 2024 · | Libéma Open | · 2026 → |

Matthew Ebden and Jordan Thompson defeated Julian Cash and Lloyd Glasspool in the final, 6–4, 3–6, [10–7] to win the men's doubles tennis title at the 2025 Libéma Open.

Nathaniel Lammons and Jackson Withrow were the defending champions, but they lost in the first round to Ariel Behar and Joran Vliegen.

== Seeds ==
1. (Croatia) Nikola Mektić / (New Zealand) Michael Venus (semifinals)
2. (United Kingdom) Julian Cash / (United Kingdom) Lloyd Glasspool (final)
3. (Australia) Matthew Ebden / (Australia) Jordan Thompson (champions)
4. (United States) Nathaniel Lammons / (United States) Jackson Withrow (first round)

== Draw ==
=== Key ===
- Q = Qualifier
- WC = Wild card
- LL = Lucky loser
- Alt = Alternate
- ITF = ITF entry
- PR = Protected ranking
- SR = Special ranking
- SE = Special exempt
- JE = Junior exempt
- JR = Junior Accelerator Programme entrant
- CO = College Accelerator Programme entrant
- NG = Next Gen Accelerator Program entrant
- w/o = Walkover
- r = Retired
- d = Defaulted

=== Draw ===
First round
1 | (Croatia) N Mektić (New Zealand) M Venus | 6 | 1 | [10]
(France) T Arribagé (Brazil) M Demoliner | 4 | 6 | [7]
(Portugal) N Borges (Italy) L Darderi | 1 | 7^{7} | [6]
(Belgium) Z Bergs (Netherlands) J de Jong | 6 | 6^{1} | [10]
3 | (Australia) M Ebden (Australia) J Thompson | 7^{7} | 6
(Colombia) N Barrientos (India) RC Bollipalli | 6^{4} | 3
(Netherlands) S Arends (France) G Jacq | 6 | 7^{7}
WC | (Netherlands) M Middelkoop (Netherlands) D Pel | 2 | 6^{3}
(Canada) G Diallo (France) U Humbert | 3 | 4
(Croatia) I Dodig (Netherlands) S Verbeek | 6 | 6
(Uruguay) A Behar (Belgium) J Vliegen | 6 | 6^{4} | [10]
4 | (United States) N Lammons (United States) J Withrow | 4 | 7^{7} | [7]
(Brazil) F Romboli (Australia) J-P Smith | 2 | 6^{5}
(Czech Republic) P Nouza (Czech Republic) P Rikl | 6 | 7^{7}
WC | (Netherlands) J-J Rojer (Netherlands) B Stevens | 3 | 6 | [10]
2 | (United Kingdom) J Cash (United Kingdom) L Glasspool | 6 | 2 | [12]

Quarterfinals
1 | (Croatia) N Mektić (New Zealand) M Venus | w/o
(Belgium) Z Bergs (Netherlands) J de Jong
3 | (Australia) M Ebden (Australia) J Thompson | 3 | 7^{7} | [10]
(Netherlands) S Arends (France) G Jacq | 6 | 6^{5} | [7]
(Croatia) I Dodig (Netherlands) S Verbeek
(Uruguay) A Behar (Belgium) J Vliegen | w/o
(Czech Republic) P Nouza (Czech Republic) P Rikl | 3 | 6^{3}
2 | (United Kingdom) J Cash (United Kingdom) L Glasspool | 6 | 7^{7}

Semifinals
1 | (Croatia) N Mektić (New Zealand) M Venus | 5 | 7^{7} | [6]
3 | (Australia) M Ebden (Australia) J Thompson | 7 | 6^{5} | [10]
(Uruguay) A Behar (Belgium) J Vliegen | 3 | 6^{6}
2 | (United Kingdom) J Cash (United Kingdom) L Glasspool | 6 | 7^{8}

Final
3 | (Australia) M Ebden (Australia) J Thompson | 6 | 3 | [10]
2 | (United Kingdom) J Cash (United Kingdom) L Glasspool | 4 | 6 | [7]
