= 2024 Libéma Open – Men's singles =

Men's singles
- 2024 Libéma Open

Final
- Champion: (Australia) Alex de Minaur
- Runner-up: (United States) Sebastian Korda
- Score: 6–2, 6–4

Details
- Draw: 28 (4 Q / 3 WC )
- Seeds: 8

Events
Singles	men	women
Doubles	men	women
← 2023 ·	Libéma Open	· 2025 →

Alex de Minaur defeated Sebastian Korda in the final, 6–2, 6–4 to win the men's singles tennis title at the 2024 Libéma Open. De Minaur did not drop a set en route to his ninth ATP Tour title and his second on grass, after the 2021 Eastbourne International. He became the first Australian man to win the title since Lleyton Hewitt in 2001.

Tallon Griekspoor was the defending champion, but lost in the semifinals to Korda.

== Seeds ==
The top four seeds received a bye into the second round.

1. (Australia) Alex de Minaur (champion)
2. (United States) Tommy Paul (quarterfinals)
3. (France) Ugo Humbert (semifinals)
4. Karen Khachanov (second round)
5. (France) Adrian Mannarino (second round)
6. (Netherlands) Tallon Griekspoor (semifinals)
7. (United States) Sebastian Korda (final)
8. (Australia) Jordan Thompson (first round)

== Draw ==
=== Key ===
- Q = Qualifier
- WC = Wild card
- LL = Lucky loser
- Alt = Alternate
- ITF = ITF entry
- PR = Protected ranking
- SR = Special ranking
- SE = Special exempt
- JE = Junior exempt
- JR = Junior Accelerator Programme entrant
- CO = College Accelerator Programme entrant
- NG = Next Gen Accelerator Program entrant
- w/o = Walkover
- r = Retired
- d = Defaulted

=== Finals ===
Semifinals
1	(Australia) Alex de Minaur	7^{7}	6
3	(France) Ugo Humbert	6^{4}	3
6	(Netherlands) Tallon Griekspoor	2	4
7	(United States) Sebastian Korda	6	6

Final
1	(Australia) Alex de Minaur	6	6
7	(United States) Sebastian Korda	2	4

=== Top half ===
First round
WC	(Netherlands) T van Rijthoven	4	3
LL	(Belgium) Z Bergs	6	6
(Spain) R Bautista Agut	7^{9}	6
Q	(Switzerland) M-A Hüsler	6^{7}	2
PR	(Canada) M Raonic	6	6
8	(Australia) J Thompson	3	4
(France) A Fils	6	6
(France) A Cazaux	4	4
(Czech Republic) J Menšík	1	6	3
Q	(Netherlands) G Brouwer	6	3	6
Q	(Italy) S Napolitano	6	6^{5}	2
5	(France) A Mannarino	3	7^{7}	6

Second round
1	(Australia) A de Minaur	7	6
LL	(Belgium) Z Bergs	5	4
(Spain) R Bautista Agut	6	2	5
PR	(Canada) M Raonic	4	6	7
3	(France) U Humbert	6	7^{7}
(France) A Fils	3	6^{1}
Q	(Netherlands) G Brouwer	6	6
5	(France) A Mannarino	3	3

Quarterfinals
1	(Australia) A de Minaur	7	6
PR	(Canada) M Raonic	5	2
3	(France) U Humbert	4	6	6
Q	(Netherlands) G Brouwer	6	3	3

Semifinals
1	(Australia) A de Minaur	7^{7}	6
3	(France) U Humbert	6^{4}	3

=== Bottom half ===
First round
6	(Netherlands) T Griekspoor	6^{3}	7^{9}	7^{7}
(Serbia) M Kecmanović	7^{7}	6^{7}	6^{3}
WC	(Netherlands) B van de Zandschulp	4	6	2
(United States) M McDonald	6	4	6
(Australia) M Purcell	3	6^{5}
(Australia) A Vukic	6	7^{7}
7	(United States) S Korda	6	7^{7}
Q	(Australia) T Schoolkate	4	6^{4}
WC	(Belgium) D Goffin	5	5
(Italy) L Nardi	7	7
(Australia) A Popyrin	6	6
(Australia) R Hijikata	4	4

Second round
6	(Netherlands) T Griekspoor	6	7^{7}
(United States) M McDonald	3	6^{5}
(Australia) A Vukic	6	5	7^{7}
4	K Khachanov	4	7	6^{4}
7	(United States) S Korda	7	7
(Italy) L Nardi	5	5
(Australia) A Popyrin	7	4	3
2	(United States) T Paul	5	6	6

Quarterfinals
6	(Netherlands) T Griekspoor	4	6	7^{7}
(Australia) A Vukic	6	3	6^{4}
7	(United States) S Korda	6	6
2	(United States) T Paul	4	2

Semifinals
6	(Netherlands) T Griekspoor	2	4
7	(United States) S Korda	6	6

== Qualifying ==
=== Seeds ===
1. (Spain) Roberto Bautista Agut (moved to main draw)
2. (Australia) Adam Walton (first round)
3. (Belgium) Zizou Bergs (qualifying competition, lucky loser)
4. (Chile) Cristian Garín (qualifying competition)
5. (France) Térence Atmane (first round)
6. (United States) Zachary Svajda (first round)
7. (Italy) Stefano Napolitano (qualified)
8. (United States) Nicolas Moreno de Alboran (first round)

=== Qualifiers ===
1. (Italy) Stefano Napolitano
2. (Switzerland) Marc-Andrea Hüsler
3. (Australia) Tristan Schoolkate
4. (Netherlands) Gijs Brouwer

=== Lucky loser ===
1. (Belgium) Zizou Bergs

=== Qualifying draw ===
==== First qualifier ====
First round
Alt	(Netherlands) Wesley Koolhof	4	2
WC	(Netherlands) Robin Haase	6	6
(Chinese Taipei) Hsu Yu-hsiou	4	7^{8}	3
7	(Italy) Stefano Napolitano	6	6^{6}	6

Qualifying competition
WC	(Netherlands) Robin Haase	4	6^{3}
7	(Italy) Stefano Napolitano	6	7^{7}

==== Second qualifier ====
First round
2	(Australia) Adam Walton	6^{3}	1
(Switzerland) Marc-Andrea Hüsler	7^{7}	6
(Finland) Otto Virtanen	4	6	7^{7}
6	(United States) Zachary Svajda	6	4	6^{4}

Qualifying competition
(Switzerland) Marc-Andrea Hüsler	7^{7}	7^{7}
(Finland) Otto Virtanen	6^{3}	6^{4}

==== Third qualifier ====
First round
3/WC	(Belgium) Zizou Bergs	6	7^{7}
(Australia) Omar Jasika	3	6^{5}
(Australia) Tristan Schoolkate	6^{3}	7^{7}	6
5	(France) Térence Atmane	7^{7}	6^{5}	3

Qualifying competition
3/WC	(Belgium) Zizou Bergs	2	3
(Australia) Tristan Schoolkate	6	6

==== Fourth qualifier ====
First round
4	(Chile) Cristian Garín	7	6
(Kazakhstan) Denis Yevseyev	5	3
(Netherlands) Gijs Brouwer	6	6^{6}	6
8	(United States) Nicolas Moreno de Alboran	3	7^{8}	1

Qualifying competition
4	(Chile) Cristian Garín	4	6	6^{3}
(Netherlands) Gijs Brouwer	6	4	7^{7}
