= 2025 Libéma Open – Women's doubles =

Women's doubles
- 2025 Libéma Open

Final
- Champions: Irina Khromacheva (Hungary) Fanny Stollár
- Runners-up: (United States) Nicole Melichar-Martinez; Liudmila Samsonova
- Score: 7–5, 6–3

Details
- Draw: 16
- Seeds: 4

Events
Singles	men	women
Doubles	men	women
← 2024 ·	Libéma Open	· 2026 →

Irina Khromacheva and Fanny Stollár defeated Nicole Melichar-Martinez and Liudmila Samsonova in the final, 7–5, 6–3 to win the women's doubles tennis title at the 2025 Libéma Open.

Ingrid Neel and Bibiane Schoofs were the reigning champions, but Neel did not participate this year. Schoofs partnered Anastasia Dețiuc, but lost in the first round to Magali Kempen and Elena-Gabriela Ruse.

== Seeds ==
1. Veronika Kudermetova / (Belgium) Elise Mertens (semifinals, withdrew)
2. Irina Khromacheva / (Hungary) Fanny Stollár (champions)
3. (United States) Nicole Melichar-Martinez / Liudmila Samsonova (final)
4. (Japan) Eri Hozumi / (Indonesia) Aldila Sutjiadi (semifinals)

== Draw ==
=== Key ===
- Q = Qualifier
- WC = Wild card
- LL = Lucky loser
- Alt = Alternate
- ITF = ITF entry
- PR = Protected ranking
- SR = Special ranking
- SE = Special exempt
- JE = Junior exempt
- JR = Junior Accelerator Programme entrant
- CO = College Accelerator Programme entrant
- NG = Next Gen Accelerator Program entrant
- w/o = Walkover
- r = Retired
- d = Defaulted

=== Draw ===
First round
1	V Kudermetova (Belgium) E Mertens	6	6
WC	(Netherlands) S Lamens (Netherlands) S van Emst	3	3
(Poland) K Piter (Serbia) N Stojanović	6	7^{9}
(United States) A Li (New Zealand) L Sun	4	6^{7}
3	(United States) N Melichar-Martinez; L Samsonova	6	6
(Italy) A Moratelli (United States) S Santamaria	3	2
(China) Xin Wang (China) S Zheng	6^{3}	6	[2]
(Ukraine) N Kichenok (Poland) M Linette	7^{7}	4	[10]
(Belgium) M Kempen (Romania) E-G Ruse	6	6
(Czech Republic) A Dețiuc (Netherlands) B Schoofs	4	1
(Georgia (country)) O Kalashnikova; E Pridankina	6	4	[14]
4	(Japan) E Hozumi (Indonesia) A Sutjiadi	3	6	[16]
E Alexandrova; A Potapova	6^{2}	5
WC	(Canada) B Andreescu (Canada) C Branstine	7^{7}	7
(Japan) M Ninomiya (China) Q Tang	2	2
2	I Khromacheva (Hungary) F Stollár	6	6

Quarterfinals
1	V Kudermetova (Belgium) E Mertens	6	6
(Poland) K Piter (Serbia) N Stojanović	4	1
3	(United States) N Melichar-Martinez; L Samsonova	6	5	[10]
(Ukraine) N Kichenok (Poland) M Linette	2	7	[5]
(Belgium) M Kempen (Romania) E-G Ruse
4	(Japan) E Hozumi (Indonesia) A Sutjiadi	w/o
WC	(Canada) B Andreescu (Canada) C Branstine	5	3
2	I Khromacheva (Hungary) F Stollár	7	6

Semifinals
1	V Kudermetova (Belgium) E Mertens
3	(United States) N Melichar-Martinez; L Samsonova	w/o
4	(Japan) E Hozumi (Indonesia) A Sutjiadi	6	3	[8]
2	I Khromacheva (Hungary) F Stollár	4	6	[10]

Final
3	(United States) N Melichar-Martinez; L Samsonova	5	3
2	I Khromacheva (Hungary) F Stollár	7	6
