= 2024 Libéma Open – Men's doubles =

Men's doubles
- 2024 Libéma Open

Final
- Champions: (United States) Nathaniel Lammons (United States) Jackson Withrow
- Runners-up: (Netherlands) Wesley Koolhof (Croatia) Nikola Mektić
- Score: 7–6^{(7–5)}, 7–6^{(7–3)}

Events
Singles	men	women
Doubles	men	women
← 2023 ·	Libéma Open	· 2025 →

Nathaniel Lammons and Jackson Withrow defeated defending champion Wesley Koolhof and his partner Nikola Mektić in the final, 7–6^{(7–5)}, 7–6^{(7–3)} to win the doubles tennis title at the 2024 Libéma Open.

Koolhof and Neal Skupski were the reigning champions, but Skupski chose to play in Stuttgart.

== Seeds ==
1. (Netherlands) Wesley Koolhof / (Croatia) Nikola Mektić (final)
2. (United States) Nathaniel Lammons / (United States) Jackson Withrow (champions)
3. (Croatia) Ivan Dodig / (United Kingdom) Henry Patten (first round)
4. (Australia) Max Purcell / (Australia) Jordan Thompson (semifinals, withdrew)

== Draw ==
=== Key ===
- Q = Qualifier
- WC = Wild card
- LL = Lucky loser
- Alt = Alternate
- ITF = ITF entry
- PR = Protected ranking
- SR = Special ranking
- SE = Special exempt
- JE = Junior exempt
- JR = Junior Accelerator Programme entrant
- CO = College Accelerator Programme entrant
- NG = Next Gen Accelerator Program entrant
- w/o = Walkover
- r = Retired
- d = Defaulted

=== Draw ===
First round
1	(Netherlands) W Koolhof (Croatia) N Mektić	7^{10}	6
(Monaco) R Arneodo (Austria) S Weissborn	6^{8}	2
(Italy) S Napolitano (Italy) L Nardi	5	3
(Colombia) N Barrientos (Portugal) F Cabral	7	6
4	(Australia) M Purcell (Australia) J Thompson	6	7^{8}
(United States) R Seggerman (United States) P Trhac	4	6^{6}
WC	(Netherlands) T Griekspoor (Netherlands) D Pel	2	6	[10]
(Netherlands) R Haase (Tunisia) S Mansouri	6	3	[12]
WC	(Australia) R Hijikata (United States) M McDonald	6	6^{7}	[10]
(United States) S Korda (United States) T Paul	2	7^{9}	[7]
(Germany) A Mies (Australia) J-P Smith	6	6^{5}	[10]
3	(Croatia) I Dodig (United Kingdom) H Patten	4	7^{7}	[6]
Alt	(Belgium) Z Bergs (Belgium) D Goffin	6	6
(United States) E King (United States) R Stalder	4	4
(Netherlands) S Arends (Netherlands) M Middelkoop	5	7^{7}	[8]
2	(United States) N Lammons (United States) J Withrow	7	6^{3}	[10]

Quarterfinals
1	(Netherlands) W Koolhof (Croatia) N Mektić	5	6	[10]
(Colombia) N Barrientos (Portugal) F Cabral	7	2	[5]
4	(Australia) M Purcell (Australia) J Thompson	7	7^{7}
(Netherlands) R Haase (Tunisia) S Mansouri	5	6^{3}
WC	(Australia) R Hijikata (United States) M McDonald	3	7^{7}	[7]
(Germany) A Mies (Australia) J-P Smith	6	6^{2}	[10]
Alt	(Belgium) Z Bergs (Belgium) D Goffin	3	7^{7}	[5]
2	(United States) N Lammons (United States) J Withrow	6	6^{3}	[10]

Semifinals
1	(Netherlands) W Koolhof (Croatia) N Mektić	w/o
4	(Australia) M Purcell (Australia) J Thompson
(Germany) A Mies (Australia) J-P Smith	3	6	[7]
2	(United States) N Lammons (United States) J Withrow	6	3	[10]

Final
1	(Netherlands) W Koolhof (Croatia) N Mektić	6^{5}	6^{3}
2	(United States) N Lammons (United States) J Withrow	7^{7}	7^{7}
