= 2024 Libéma Open – Women's doubles =

Women's doubles
- 2024 Libéma Open

Final
- Champions: (Estonia) Ingrid Neel (Netherlands) Bibiane Schoofs
- Runners-up: (Slovakia) Tereza Mihalíková (United Kingdom) Olivia Nicholls
- Score: 7–6^{(8–6)}, 6–3

Details
- Draw: 16
- Seeds: 4

Events
Singles	men	women
Doubles	men	women
← 2023 ·	Libéma Open	· 2025 →

Ingrid Neel and Bibiane Schoofs defeated Tereza Mihalíková and Olivia Nicholls in the final, 7–6^{(8–6)}, 6–3 to win the women's doubles tennis title at the 2024 Libéma Open.

Shuko Aoyama and Ena Shibahara were the reigning champions, but Shibahara chose to compete in Nottingham instead. Aoyama partnered Aldila Sutjiadi, but lost in the quarterfinals to Suzan Lamens and Eva Vedder.

== Seeds ==
1. (United States) Jessica Pegula / (Netherlands) Demi Schuurs (first round)
2. (Japan) Shuko Aoyama / (Indonesia) Aldila Sutjiadi (quarterfinals)
3. (Japan) Eri Hozumi / (Japan) Makoto Ninomiya (first round)
4. Ekaterina Alexandrova / Veronika Kudermetova (withdrew)

== Draw ==
=== Key ===
- Q = Qualifier
- WC = Wild card
- LL = Lucky loser
- Alt = Alternate
- ITF = ITF entry
- PR = Protected ranking
- SR = Special ranking
- SE = Special exempt
- JE = Junior exempt
- JR = Junior Accelerator Programme entrant
- CO = College Accelerator Programme entrant
- NG = Next Gen Accelerator Program entrant
- w/o = Walkover
- r = Retired
- d = Defaulted

=== Draw ===
First round
1	(United States) J Pegula (Netherlands) D Schuurs	3	6	[8]
(Czech Republic) M Kolodziejová (Czech Republic) A Sisková	6	4	[10]
(Estonia) I Neel (Netherlands) B Schoofs	6	6
(France) E Lechemia (Belgium) K Zimmermann	2	1
3	(Japan) E Hozumi (Japan) M Ninomiya	1	6^{3}
(Poland) M Linette (Netherlands) A Rus	6	7^{7}
A Blinkova (Brazil) I Martins	3	3
L Samsonova; D Shnaider	6	6
(Kazakhstan) A Danilina (China) Y Xu	1	6	[5]
(Slovakia) T Mihalíková (United Kingdom) O Nicholls	6	3	[10]
(Georgia (country)) O Kalashnikova; Y Sizikova	6	6
Alt	(China) Z Bai (China) Y Yuan	2	2
WC	(Netherlands) S Lamens (Netherlands) E Vedder	6	6
(Slovakia) V Hrunčáková; I Khromacheva	4	2
WC	(Netherlands) I Haverlag (Netherlands) M Krajicek	5	1
2	(Japan) S Aoyama (Indonesia) A Sutjiadi	7	6

Quarterfinals
(Czech Republic) M Kolodziejová (Czech Republic) A Sisková	6^{4}	4
(Estonia) I Neel (Netherlands) B Schoofs	7^{7}	6
(Poland) M Linette (Netherlands) A Rus	1	4
L Samsonova; D Shnaider	6	6
(Slovakia) T Mihalíková (United Kingdom) O Nicholls	6	6
(Georgia (country)) O Kalashnikova; Y Sizikova	0	3
WC	(Netherlands) S Lamens (Netherlands) E Vedder	6	7^{7}
2	(Japan) S Aoyama (Indonesia) A Sutjiadi	3	6^{0}

Semifinals
(Estonia) I Neel (Netherlands) B Schoofs	6	3
L Samsonova; D Shnaider	4	1^{r}
(Slovakia) T Mihalíková (United Kingdom) O Nicholls	6	6
WC	(Netherlands) S Lamens (Netherlands) E Vedder	1	3

Final
(Estonia) I Neel (Netherlands) B Schoofs	7^{8}	6
(Slovakia) T Mihalíková (United Kingdom) O Nicholls	6^{6}	3
