= 2023 Libéma Open – Men's singles =

Men's singles
- 2023 Libéma Open

Final
- Champion: (Netherlands) Tallon Griekspoor
- Runner-up: (Australia) Jordan Thompson
- Score: 6–7^{(4–7)}, 7–6^{(7–3)}, 6–3

Details
- Draw: 28 (4 Q / 3 WC )
- Seeds: 8

Events
Singles	men	women
Doubles	men	women
← 2022 ·	Libéma Open	· 2024 →

Tallon Griekspoor defeated Jordan Thompson in the final, 6–7^{(4–7)}, 7–6^{(7–3)}, 6–3 to win the men's singles tennis title at the 2023 Libéma Open. It was his second ATP Tour title.

Tim van Rijthoven was the reigning champion, but did not compete due to an elbow injury.

This tournament marked the return of 2016 Wimbledon finalist and former world No. 3 Milos Raonic, after being away from the tour since 2021. He lost in the second round to Thompson.

== Seeds ==
The top four seeds received a bye into the second round.

1. Daniil Medvedev (second round)
2. (Italy) Jannik Sinner (quarterfinals)
3. (Croatia) Borna Ćorić (second round)
4. (Australia) Alex de Minaur (quarterfinals)
5. (Serbia) Miomir Kecmanović (first round)
6. (Netherlands) Tallon Griekspoor (champion)
7. (France) Ugo Humbert (second round)
8. (United States) Maxime Cressy (first round)

== Draw ==
=== Key ===
- Q = Qualifier
- WC = Wild card
- LL = Lucky loser
- Alt = Alternate
- SE = Special exempt
- PR = Protected ranking
- ITF = ITF entry
- JE = Junior exempt
- w/o = Walkover
- r = Retired
- d = Defaulted
- SR = Special ranking

=== Finals ===
Semifinals
(Australia) Jordan Thompson	7^{7}	6
LL	(Australia) Rinky Hijikata	6^{5}	3
6	(Netherlands) Tallon Griekspoor	6	7
(Finland) Emil Ruusuvuori	4	5

Final
(Australia) Jordan Thompson	7^{7}	6^{3}	3
6	(Netherlands) Tallon Griekspoor	6^{4}	7^{7}	6

=== Top half ===
First round
(France) A Mannarino	7^{7}	6
Q	(France) A Fils	6^{1}	4
(Australia) J Thompson	6	7^{7}
Q	(France) G Mpetshi Perricard	4	6^{3}
PR	(Canada) M Raonic	6	6
5	(Serbia) M Kecmanović	3	4
(United States) M McDonald	6	6
I Ivashka	4	3
LL	(Australia) R Hijikata	6^{5}	6	6
WC	(Netherlands) G Brouwer	7^{7}	3	2
(Switzerland) M-A Hüsler	6	7^{7}
8	(United States) M Cressy	2	6^{2}

Second round
1	D Medvedev	6	4	2
(France) A Mannarino	4	6	6
(Australia) J Thompson	7^{7}	6
PR	(Canada) M Raonic	6^{4}	1
3	(Croatia) B Ćorić	4	4
(United States) M McDonald	6	6
LL	(Australia) R Hijikata	2	7	6
(Switzerland) M-A Hüsler	6	5	3

Quarterfinals
(France) A Mannarino	7	6^{2}	2
(Australia) J Thompson	5	7^{7}	6
(United States) M McDonald	7	3	1
LL	(Australia) R Hijikata	5	6	6

Semifinals
(Australia) J Thompson	7^{7}	6
LL	(Australia) R Hijikata	6^{5}	3

=== Bottom half ===
First round
6	(Netherlands) T Griekspoor	6	3	6
(Sweden) M Ymer	2	6	3
WC	(France) A Rinderknech	3	6^{6}
(Australia) A Popyrin	6	7^{8}
(Serbia) L Djere	6	6
Q	(Lithuania) R Berankis	4	2
7	(France) U Humbert	6	6
(Australia) J Kubler	4	2
(Finland) E Ruusuvuori	6	3	6
(United States) B Nakashima	3	6	3
(Kazakhstan) A Bublik	7	7
Q	(Belgium) D Goffin	5	5

Second round
6	(Netherlands) T Griekspoor	6	6
(Australia) A Popyrin	3	2
(Serbia) L Djere	1	7^{7}	3
4	(Australia) A de Minaur	6	6^{5}	6
7	(France) U Humbert	2	7^{8}	4
(Finland) E Ruusuvuori	6	6^{6}	6
(Kazakhstan) A Bublik	4	2
2/WC	(Italy) J Sinner	6	6

Quarterfinals
6	(Netherlands) T Griekspoor	4	6	6
4	(Australia) A de Minaur	6	3	4
(Finland) E Ruusuvuori	6	6
2/WC	(Italy) J Sinner	3	4

Semifinals
6	(Netherlands) T Griekspoor	6	7
(Finland) E Ruusuvuori	4	5

== Qualifying ==
=== Seeds ===
1. (France) Arthur Fils (qualified)
2. (Belgium) David Goffin (qualified)
3. Pavel Kotov (first round)
4. (Australia) Rinky Hijikata (qualifying competition, lucky loser)
5. (Italy) Andrea Vavassori (first round)
6. (Netherlands) Jelle Sels (first round)
7. (Netherlands) Jesper de Jong (qualifying competition)
8. (Lithuania) Ričardas Berankis (qualified)

=== Qualifiers ===
1. (France) Arthur Fils
2. (Belgium) David Goffin
3. (France) Giovanni Mpetshi Perricard
4. (Lithuania) Ričardas Berankis

=== Lucky loser ===
1. (Australia) Rinky Hijikata

=== Qualifying draw ===
==== First qualifier ====
First round
1	(France) Arthur Fils	6	6
(South Africa) Lloyd Harris	4	4
PR	(France) Pierre-Hugues Herbert	6	6
6	(Netherlands) Jelle Sels	3	2

Qualifying competition
1	(France) Arthur Fils	6	6
PR	(France) Pierre-Hugues Herbert	3	3

==== Second qualifier ====
First round
2	(Belgium) David Goffin	6	6
WC	(Netherlands) Alec Deckers	4	1
Alt	(Netherlands) Thijmen Loof	3	1
7	(Netherlands) Jesper de Jong	6	6

Qualifying competition
2	(Belgium) David Goffin	2	6	7^{8}
7	(Netherlands) Jesper de Jong	6	2	6^{6}

==== Third qualifier ====
First round
3	Pavel Kotov	2	4
(Israel) Edan Leshem	6	6
(France) Giovanni Mpetshi Perricard	6	4	6
5	(Italy) Andrea Vavassori	4	6	3

Qualifying competition
(Israel) Edan Leshem	7^{7}	4	4
(France) Giovanni Mpetshi Perricard	6^{5}	6	6

==== Fourth qualifier ====
First round
4	(Australia) Rinky Hijikata	6	7
(Netherlands) Robin Haase	3	5
WC	(Netherlands) Noah Gabriel	1	1
8	(Lithuania) Ričardas Berankis	6	6

Qualifying competition
4	(Australia) Rinky Hijikata	4	4
8	(Lithuania) Ričardas Berankis	6	6
