= 2026 Libéma Open – Women's doubles =

Women's doubles
- 2026 Libéma Open

Final
- Champions: (Japan) Shuko Aoyama (Chinese Taipei) Liang En-shuo
- Runners-up: (Estonia) Ingrid Neel (Mexico) Giuliana Olmos
- Score: 6–2, 2–6, [10–7]

Details
- Draw: 16
- Seeds: 4

Events
Singles	men	women
Doubles	men	women
- Libéma Open

Shuko Aoyama and Liang En-shuo defeated Ingrid Neel and Giuliana Olmos in the final, 6–2, 2–6, [10–7] to win the women's doubles tennis title at the 2026 Rosmalen Grass Court Championships.

Irina Khromacheva and Fanny Stollár were the reigning champions, but Stollár chose to compete at Queen's Club instead. Khromacheva partnered Anastasia Dețiuc, but they retired in the semifinals against Aoyama and Liang.

== Seeds ==
1. (China) Jiang Xinyu / (China) Xu Yifan (first round)
2. (Indonesia) Aldila Sutjiadi / (Indonesia) Janice Tjen (first round)
3. Ekaterina Alexandrova / (Australia) Maya Joint (first round)
4. (Japan) Eri Hozumi / (Chinese Taipei) Wu Fang-hsien (semifinals)

== Draw ==
Key

- Q = Qualifier
- WC = Wild card
- LL = Lucky loser
- Alt = Alternate
- ITF = ITF entry
- PR = Protected ranking
- SR = Special ranking
- SE = Special exempt
- JE = Junior exempt
- JR = Junior Accelerator Programme entrant
- CO = College Accelerator Programme entrant
- NG = Next Gen Accelerator Program entrant
- w/o = Walkover
- r = Retired
- d = Defaulted

=== Draw ===
First round
1	(China) X Jiang (China) Y Xu	6^{4}	4
(Czech Republic) A Dețiuc; I Khromacheva	7^{7}	6
(Czech Republic) J Malečková (Czech Republic) M Škoch	5	2
(Chinese Taipei) H-c Chan (Turkey) Z Sönmez	7	6
3	E Alexandrova (Australia) M Joint	0	4
(Japan) S Aoyama (Chinese Taipei) E-s Liang	6	6
WC	(Canada) B Andreescu (France) L Boisson	6	6
WC	(Netherlands) A Koevermans (Netherlands) S Lamens	1	4
(Ukraine) N Kichenok (Japan) M Ninomiya	5	4
(Poland) K Piter (Czech Republic) A Sisková	7	6
(Belgium) M Kempen (China) Q Tang	2	7^{7}	[9]
4	(Japan) E Hozumi (Chinese Taipei) F-h Wu	6	6^{5}	[11]
PR	(Estonia) I Neel (Mexico) G Olmos	6	7^{7}
Alt	(Hungary) P Udvardy (Mexico) R Zarazúa	4	6^{1}
(Netherlands) I Haverlag (United Kingdom) M Lumsden	6	4	[10]
2	(Indonesia) A Sutjiadi (Indonesia) J Tjen	1	6	[8]

Quarterfinals
(Czech Republic) A Dețiuc; I Khromacheva	6	6
(Chinese Taipei) H-c Chan (Turkey) Z Sönmez	3	4
(Japan) S Aoyama (Chinese Taipei) E-s Liang	6	6
WC	(Canada) B Andreescu (France) L Boisson	1	4
(Poland) K Piter (Czech Republic) A Sisková	5	6	[7]
4	(Japan) E Hozumi (Chinese Taipei) F-h Wu	7	0	[10]
PR	(Estonia) I Neel (Mexico) G Olmos	6	6
(Netherlands) I Haverlag (United Kingdom) M Lumsden	3	3

Semifinals
(Czech Republic) A Dețiuc; I Khromacheva	4	1^{r}
(Japan) S Aoyama (Chinese Taipei) E-s Liang	6	4
4	(Japan) E Hozumi (Chinese Taipei) F-h Wu	6^{1}	2
PR	(Estonia) I Neel (Mexico) G Olmos	7^{7}	6

Final
(Japan) S Aoyama (Chinese Taipei) E-s Liang	6	2	[10]
PR	(Estonia) I Neel (Mexico) G Olmos	2	6	[7]
