= 2026 Libéma Open – Men's singles =

Men's singles
- 2026 Libéma Open

Final
- Champion: (Poland) Kamil Majchrzak
- Runner-up: (Australia) Alex de Minaur
- Score: 6–3, 2–6, 7–6^{(7–5)}

Details
- Draw: 28 (4 Q / 3 WC )
- Seeds: 8

Events
Singles	men	women
Doubles	men	women
- Rosmalen Open

Kamil Majchrzak defeated Alex de Minaur in the final, 6–3, 2–6, 7–6^{(7–5)} to win the men's singles tennis title at the 2026 Rosmalen Grass Court Championships. It was his first ATP Tour title. He was just the second man to earn three top-10 wins en route to an ATP 250 title, since the series began, after Grigor Dimitrov at the 2017 Brisbane International.

Gabriel Diallo was the defending champion, but lost in the first round to Adrian Mannarino.

Aged 17 years and 11 months, Thijs Boogaard became the second-youngest player to win a main draw match in tournament history.

== Seeds ==
The top four seeds received a bye into the second round.

1. (Canada) Félix Auger-Aliassime (quarterfinals)
2. (Australia) Alex de Minaur (final)
3. Daniil Medvedev (semifinals)
4. (France) Arthur Rinderknech (second round)
5. (France) Ugo Humbert (second round)
6. (Netherlands) Tallon Griekspoor (second round)
7. (Canada) Denis Shapovalov (first round)
8. (Belgium) Zizou Bergs (first round)

== Draw ==
Key

- Q = Qualifier
- WC = Wild card
- LL = Lucky loser
- Alt = Alternate
- ITF = ITF entry
- PR = Protected ranking
- SR = Special ranking
- SE = Special exempt
- JE = Junior exempt
- JR = Junior Accelerator Programme entrant
- CO = College Accelerator Programme entrant
- NG = Next Gen Accelerator Program entrant
- w/o = Walkover
- r = Retired
- d = Defaulted

=== Finals ===
Semifinals
(Poland) Kamil Majchrzak	7^{7}	6
3	Daniil Medvedev	6^{4}	1
(France) Adrian Mannarino	4	0
2	(Australia) Alex de Minaur	6	6

Final
(Poland) Kamil Majchrzak	6	2	7^{7}
2	(Australia) Alex de Minaur	3	6	6^{5}

=== Top half ===
First round
(Poland) H Hurkacz	6	6^{5}	6^{4}
(Hungary) M Fucsovics	3	7^{7}	7^{7}
WC	(Finland) O Virtanen	7^{9}	4	6^{4}
(Poland) K Majchrzak	6^{7}	6	7^{7}
Q	(Australia) J McCabe	6^{2}	6	7^{7}
8	(Belgium) Z Bergs	7^{7}	2	6^{4}
WC	(Netherlands) T Boogaard	6	2	6
(China) Y Wu	3	6	4
(Portugal) N Borges	6	6
(France) T Atmane	4	4
(Croatia) M Čilić	6^{5}	6	7
7	(Canada) D Shapovalov	7^{7}	4	5

Second round
1	(Canada) F Auger-Aliassime	6	6
(Hungary) M Fucsovics	3	4
(Poland) K Majchrzak	6	6
Q	(Australia) J McCabe	0	3
3	D Medvedev	6	4	7^{8}
WC	(Netherlands) T Boogaard	3	6	6^{6}
(Portugal) N Borges	6	6^{5}	3
(Croatia) M Čilić	3	7^{7}	6

Quarterfinals
1	(Canada) F Auger-Aliassime	4	3
(Poland) K Majchrzak	6	6
3	D Medvedev	6	3	6
(Croatia) M Čilić	2	6	1

Semifinals
(Poland) K Majchrzak	7^{7}	6
3	D Medvedev	6^{4}	1

=== Bottom half ===
First round
6	(Netherlands) T Griekspoor	6	6^{2}	6
(Netherlands) B van de Zandschulp	2	7^{7}	4
PR	(China) Z Zhang	7^{7}	5	6
(United States) J Brooksby	6^{4}	7	1
(Canada) G Diallo	4	6	5
(France) A Mannarino	6	3	7
5	(France) U Humbert	6	6
Q	(Sweden) E Ymer	4	3
Q	(France) B Bonzi	6	6
WC	(Netherlands) M Röttgering	4	4
(Spain) J Munar	4	4
Q	(United States) M Damm	6	6

Second round
6	(Netherlands) T Griekspoor	6^{5}	4
PR	(China) Z Zhang	7^{7}	6
(France) A Mannarino	7^{7}	3	6
4	(France) A Rinderknech	6^{5}	6	3
5	(France) U Humbert	4	6	3
Q	(France) B Bonzi	6	3	6
Q	(United States) M Damm	6^{8}	5
2	(Australia) A de Minaur	7^{10}	7

Quarterfinals
PR	(China) Z Zhang	6^{4}	3
(France) A Mannarino	7^{7}	6
Q	(France) B Bonzi	2	4
2	(Australia) A de Minaur	6	6

Semifinals
(France) A Mannarino	4	0
2	(Australia) A de Minaur	6	6

== Qualifying ==
=== Seeds ===
1. (France) Benjamin Bonzi (qualified)
2. (Hong Kong) Coleman Wong (first round)
3. (United States) Martin Damm (qualified)
4. (United States) Mackenzie McDonald (first round)
5. (Japan) Shintaro Mochizuki (first round)
6. (Sweden) Elias Ymer (qualified)
7. (Australia) Bernard Tomic (qualifying competition)
8. (Argentina) Juan Pablo Ficovich (qualifying competition)

=== Qualifiers ===
1. (France) Benjamin Bonzi
2. (Australia) James McCabe
3. (United States) Martin Damm
4. (Sweden) Elias Ymer

=== Qualifying draw ===
==== First qualifier ====
First round
1	(France) Benjamin Bonzi	6	7^{7}
(Australia) Marc Polmans	2	6^{3}
WC	(Netherlands) Alec Deckers	2	3
7	(Australia) Bernard Tomic	6	6

Qualifying competition
1	(France) Benjamin Bonzi	6^{5}	6	7
7	(Australia) Bernard Tomic	7^{7}	2	5

==== Second qualifier ====
First round
2	(Hong Kong) Coleman Wong	6	4	3
(Australia) James McCabe	3	6	6
WC	(Netherlands) Sander Jong	4	6	6
5	(Japan) Shintaro Mochizuki	6	3	4

Qualifying competition
(Australia) James McCabe	7^{7}	6
WC	(Netherlands) Sander Jong	6^{5}	4

==== Third qualifier ====
First round
3	(United States) Martin Damm	4	6	7^{7}
(Netherlands) Max Houkes	6	3	6^{4}
Alt	(Netherlands) Thijmen Loof	6^{3}	6	2
8	(Argentina) Juan Pablo Ficovich	7^{7}	4	6

Qualifying competition
3	(United States) Martin Damm	6	6
8	(Argentina) Juan Pablo Ficovich	2	2

==== Fourth qualifier ====
First round
4	(United States) Mackenzie McDonald	6^{7}	5
Alt	(Netherlands) Niels Visker	7^{9}	7
Alt	(Netherlands) Mac Visser	4	4
6	(Sweden) Elias Ymer	6	6

Qualifying competition
Alt	(Netherlands) Niels Visker	4	6^{3}
6	(Sweden) Elias Ymer	6	7^{7}
