= 2023 Libéma Open =

- Date: 12–18 June
- Edition: 32nd
- Category: ATP Tour 250; WTA 250
- Draw: 28S / 16D (men); 32S / 16D (women)
- Prize money: €673,630 (ATP) $259,303 (WTA)
- Surface: Grass
- Location: Rosmalen, 's-Hertogenbosch, Netherlands

Champions

Men's singles
- (Netherlands) Tallon Griekspoor

Women's singles
- Ekaterina Alexandrova

Men's doubles
- (Netherlands) Wesley Koolhof / (United Kingdom) Neal Skupski

Women's doubles
- (Japan) Shuko Aoyama / (Japan) Ena Shibahara
- Rosmalen Grass Court Championships

The 2023 Libéma Open was a professional tennis tournament played on the outdoor grass courts at Autotron Rosmalen in Rosmalen, 's-Hertogenbosch, Netherlands from 12 to 18 June 2023. It was the 32nd edition of the Rosmalen Grass Court Championships and was classified as an ATP 250 event on the men's 2023 ATP Tour and a WTA 250 event on the women's 2023 WTA Tour.

== Champions ==
=== Men's singles ===
- (Netherlands) Tallon Griekspoor def. (Australia) Jordan Thompson, 6–7^{(4–7)}, 7–6^{(7–3)}, 6–3

=== Women's singles ===
- Ekaterina Alexandrova def. Veronika Kudermetova, 4–6, 6–4, 7–6^{(7–3)}

=== Men's doubles ===
- (Netherlands) Wesley Koolhof / (United Kingdom) Neal Skupski def. (Ecuador) Gonzalo Escobar / (Kazakhstan) Aleksandr Nedovyesov, 7–6^{(7–1)}, 6–2

=== Women's doubles ===
- (Japan) Shuko Aoyama / (Japan) Ena Shibahara def. (Slovakia) Viktória Hrunčáková / (Slovakia) Tereza Mihalíková, 6–3, 6–3

== Points and prize money ==
=== Points ===
| Event | W | F | SF | QF | R16 | R32 | Q | Q2 | Q1 |
| Men's singles | 250 | 150 | 90 | 45 | 20* | 0 | 12 | 6 | 0 |
| Men's doubles | 250 | 150 | 90 | 45 | 0 | —N/a | —N/a | —N/a | —N/a |
| Women's singles | 280 | 180 | 110 | 60 | 30 | 1 | 18 | 12 | 1 |
| Women's doubles | 280 | 180 | 110 | 60 | 1 | —N/a | —N/a | —N/a | —N/a |

- Players with byes receive first round points.

=== Prize money ===
| Event | W | F | SF | QF | Round of 16 | Round of 32 | Q2 | Q1 |
| Men's singles | €102,460 | €59,760 | €35,135 | €20,360 | €11,825 | €7,225 | €3,610 | €1,970 |
| Men's doubles* | €35,600 | €19,040 | €11,160 | €6,240 | €3,680 | —N/a | —N/a | —N/a |

_{*per team}

== ATP singles main draw entrants ==
=== Seeds ===
| Country | Player | Rank^{1} | Seed |
|---|---|---|---|
| | Daniil Medvedev | 2 | 1 |
| ITA | Jannik Sinner | 9 | 2 |
| CRO | Borna Ćorić | 16 | 3 |
| AUS | Alex de Minaur | 19 | 4 |
| SRB | Miomir Kecmanović | 37 | 5 |
| NED | Tallon Griekspoor | 39 | 6 |
| FRA | Ugo Humbert | 40 | 7 |
| USA | Maxime Cressy | 44 | 8 |

- ^{1} Rankings are as of 29 May 2023.

=== Other entrants ===
The following players received wildcards into the main draw:

- (Netherlands) Gijs Brouwer
- (France) Arthur Rinderknech
- (Italy) Jannik Sinner

The following player received entry using a protected ranking into the main draw:

- (Canada) Milos Raonic

The following players received entry from the qualifying draw:

- (Lithuania) Ričardas Berankis
- (France) Arthur Fils
- (Belgium) David Goffin
- (France) Giovanni Mpetshi Perricard

The following player received entry as a lucky loser:

- (Australia) Rinky Hijikata

=== Withdrawals ===
- (Canada) Félix Auger-Aliassime → replaced by (Switzerland) Marc-Andrea Hüsler
- (Spain) Roberto Bautista Agut → replaced by (Australia) Jason Kubler
- (Spain) Pablo Carreño Busta → replaced by (Australia) Alexei Popyrin
- (Croatia) Marin Čilić → replaced by (Australia) Jordan Thompson
- (Netherlands) Botic van de Zandschulp → replaced by (Australia) Rinky Hijikata
- (Spain) Bernabé Zapata Miralles → replaced by Ilya Ivashka

== ATP doubles main draw entrants ==
=== Seeds ===
| Country | Player | Country | Player | Rank^{1} | Seed |
|---|---|---|---|---|---|
| NED | Wesley Koolhof | GBR | Neal Skupski | 2 | 1 |
| ESA | Marcelo Arévalo | NED | Jean-Julien Rojer | 12 | 2 |
| MON | Hugo Nys | POL | Jan Zieliński | 26 | 3 |
| AUS | Rinky Hijikata | AUS | Jason Kubler | 61 | 4 |

- ^{1} Rankings are as of 29 May 2023.

=== Other entrants ===
The following pairs received wildcards into the doubles main draw:

- (Netherlands) Sander Arends / (Netherlands) David Pel
- (Netherlands) Matwé Middelkoop / (Netherlands) Bart Stevens

=== Withdrawals ===
- (France) Jérémy Chardy / (France) Fabrice Martin → replaced by (United States) Brandon Nakashima / (Finland) Emil Ruusuvuori
- (United States) Maxime Cressy / (France) Adrian Mannarino → replaced by (United States) Maxime Cressy / (France) Fabrice Martin
- (Australia) Alex de Minaur / (Australia) Max Purcell → replaced by (Australia) Alex de Minaur / (Australia) Jordan Thompson
- (Belgium) Sander Gillé / (Belgium) Joran Vliegen → replaced by (Ecuador) Gonzalo Escobar / (Kazakhstan) Aleksandr Nedovyesov
- (United States) Mackenzie McDonald / (Netherlands) Botic van de Zandschulp → replaced by (Kazakhstan) Alexander Bublik / (United States) Mackenzie McDonald

== WTA singles main draw entrants ==
=== Seeds ===
| Country | Player | Rank^{1} | Seed |
|---|---|---|---|
| | Veronika Kudermetova | 11 | 1 |
| | Liudmila Samsonova | 15 | 2 |
| | Victoria Azarenka | 18 | 3 |
| | Ekaterina Alexandrova | 23 | 4 |
| ~~BEL~~ | ~~Elise Mertens~~ | ~~28~~ | ~~5~~ |
| CAN | Bianca Andreescu | 42 | 6 |
| | Aliaksandra Sasnovich | 51 | 7 |
| USA | Caty McNally | 57 | 8 |

- ^{1} Rankings are as of 29 May 2023.

=== Other entrants ===
The following players received wildcards into the main draw:

- (Switzerland) Céline Naef
- (Netherlands) Lesley Pattinama Kerkhove
- (United States) Venus Williams

The following player received entry using a protected ranking into the singles main draw:

- Evgeniya Rodina

The following players received entry from the qualifying draw:

- (Switzerland) Susan Bandecchi
- (United States) Emina Bektas
- (Germany) Lena Papadakis
- (Turkey) Zeynep Sönmez
- (Serbia) Natalija Stevanović
- (Canada) Carol Zhao

The following players received entry as lucky losers:

- (Australia) Priscilla Hon
- (United States) Sachia Vickery

=== Withdrawals ===
- (Spain) Paula Badosa → replaced by Polina Kudermetova
- (Switzerland) Belinda Bencic → replaced by (China) Yuan Yue
- Anna Blinkova → replaced by (Australia) Kimberly Birrell
- (Czech Republic) Marie Bouzková → replaced by (France) Jessika Ponchet
- Varvara Gracheva → replaced by (Slovakia) Viktória Hrunčáková
- (Germany) Eva Lys → replaced by (Australia) Priscilla Hon
- (Croatia) Petra Martić → replaced by (United States) Katie Volynets
- (Belgium) Elise Mertens → replaced by (United States) Sachia Vickery
- (Czech Republic) Karolína Muchová → replaced by (Belgium) Greet Minnen
- (United States) Shelby Rogers → replaced by (Italy) Lucrezia Stefanini
- (China) Zheng Qinwen → replaced by (Hungary) Dalma Gálfi

== WTA doubles main draw entrants ==
=== Seeds ===
| Country | Player | Country | Player | Rank^{1} | Seed |
|---|---|---|---|---|---|
| BEL | Elise Mertens | NED | Demi Schuurs | 22 | 1 |
| USA | Nicole Melichar-Martinez | AUS | Ellen Perez | 29 | 2 |
| JPN | Shuko Aoyama | JPN | Ena Shibahara | 41 | 3 |
| | Veronika Kudermetova | | Liudmila Samsonova | 63 | 4 |

- ^{1} Rankings are as of 29 May 2023.

=== Other entrants ===
The following pairs received wildcards into the doubles main draw:

- (Netherlands) Lesley Pattinama Kerkhove / (Netherlands) Bibiane Schoofs
- (Netherlands) Lexie Stevens / (Netherlands) Eva Vedder
