= 2025 Libéma Open – Women's singles =

Women's singles
- 2025 Libéma Open

Final
- Champion: (Belgium) Elise Mertens
- Runner-up: (Romania) Elena-Gabriela Ruse
- Score: 6–3, 7–6^{(7–4)}

Details
- Draw: 32 (6 Q / 3 WC )
- Seeds: 8

Events
Singles	men	women
Doubles	men	women
- Libéma Open

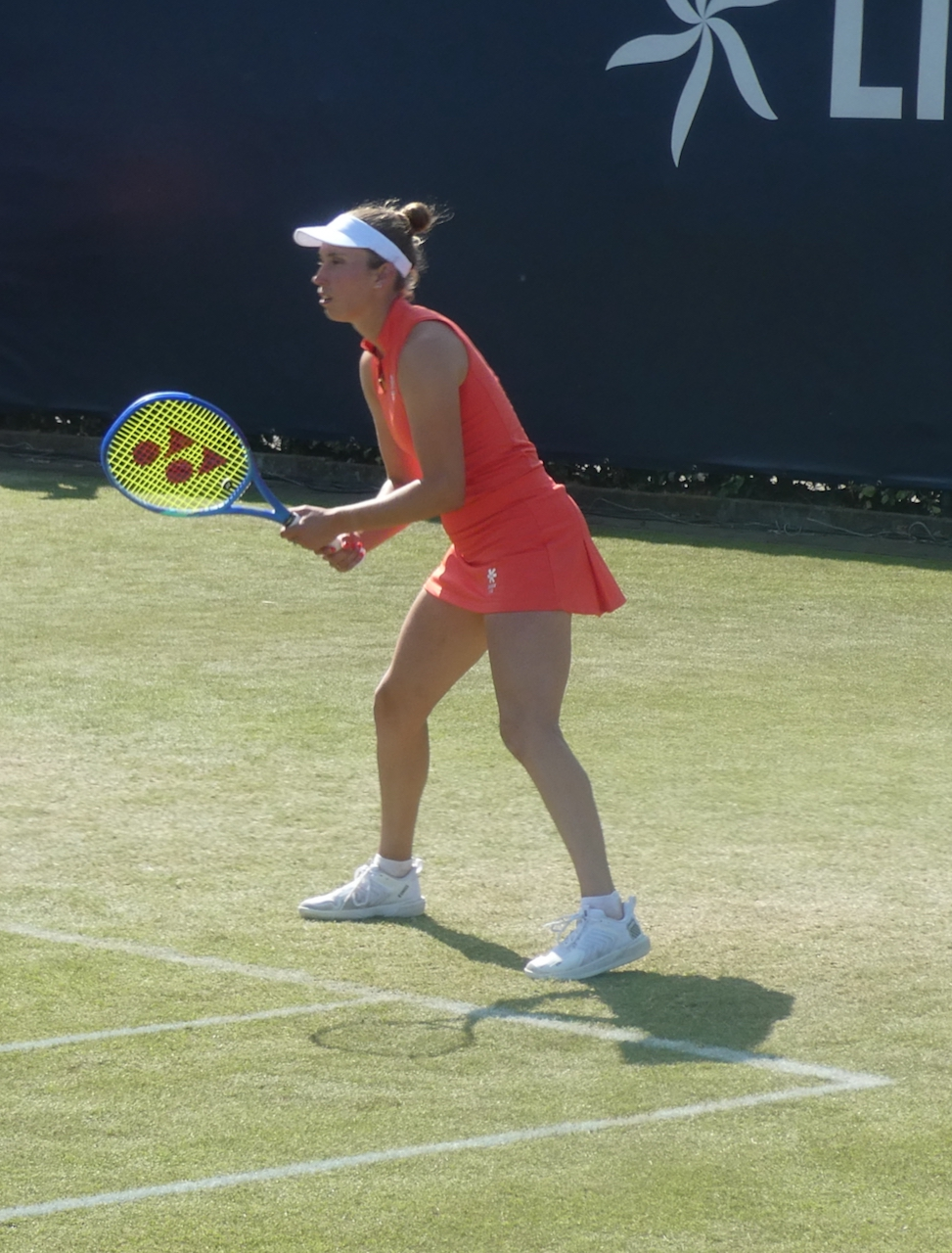
Champion Elise Mertens in action during the tournament

Elise Mertens defeated Elena-Gabriela Ruse in the final, 6–3, 7–6^{(7–4)} to win the women's singles tennis title at the 2025 Libéma Open. She saved eleven match points en route to her tenth WTA Tour singles title, in the semifinals against Ekaterina Alexandrova. Her eleven match points saved in one match were also the most in a WTA Tour main-draw match win this century, equaling the record set by Zsófia Gubacsi at the 2001 French Open. This was Mertens' first title on grass courts, having now won titles on all three surfaces.

Liudmila Samsonova was the defending champion, but lost in the first round to Carson Branstine.

== Seeds ==
1. Liudmila Samsonova (first round)
2. Ekaterina Alexandrova (semifinals)
3. (Belgium) Elise Mertens (champion)
4. (Poland) Magda Linette (first round)
5. Anastasia Potapova (first round)
6. (China) Wang Xinyu (first round)
7. (New Zealand) Lulu Sun (second round)
8. Veronika Kudermetova (quarterfinals)

== Draw ==
Key

- Q = Qualifier
- WC = Wild card
- LL = Lucky loser
- Alt = Alternate
- ITF = ITF entry
- PR = Protected ranking
- SR = Special ranking
- SE = Special exempt
- JE = Junior exempt
- JR = Junior Accelerator Programme entrant
- CO = College Accelerator Programme entrant
- NG = Next Gen Accelerator Program entrant
- w/o = Walkover
- r = Retired
- d = Defaulted

=== Finals ===
Semifinals
Q	(Romania) Elena-Gabriela Ruse	2	6	6
(Italy) Elisabetta Cocciaretto	6	4	3
3	(Belgium) Elise Mertens	2	7^{9}	6
2	Ekaterina Alexandrova	6	6^{7}	4

Final
Q	(Romania) Elena-Gabriela Ruse	3	6^{4}
3	(Belgium) Elise Mertens	6	7^{7}

=== Top half ===
First round
1	L Samsonova	4	7	1
Q	(Canada) C Branstine	6	5	6
Q	(Netherlands) IL van den Broek	2	1
Q	(Romania) E-G Ruse	6	6
Q	(Chinese Taipei) J Garland	1	3
WC	(Canada) B Andreescu	6	6
WC	(Netherlands) A Vrancken Peeters	1	3
7	(New Zealand) L Sun	6	6
4	(Poland) M Linette	2	7^{12}	5
(United States) B Pera	6	6^{10}	7
WC	(Netherlands) A Hartono	6^{11}	5
(Italy) E Cocciaretto	7^{13}	7
Q	(Belgium) Y Wickmayer	3	6	3
(Netherlands) S Lamens	6	0	6
(United States) A Li	7	6
5	A Potapova	5	2

Second round
Q	(Canada) C Branstine	4	3
Q	(Romania) E-G Ruse	6	6
WC	(Canada) B Andreescu	6	6
7	(New Zealand) L Sun	0	4
(United States) B Pera	1	6^{4}
(Italy) E Cocciaretto	6	7^{7}
(Netherlands) S Lamens	7^{7}	7^{7}
(United States) A Li	6^{4}	6^{5}

Quarterfinals
Q	(Romania) E-G Ruse	6	6
WC	(Canada) B Andreescu	2	4
(Italy) E Cocciaretto	6	7^{7}
(Netherlands) S Lamens	2	6^{4}

Semifinals
Q	(Romania) E-G Ruse	2	6	6
(Italy) E Cocciaretto	6	4	3

=== Bottom half ===
First round
6	(China) Xin Wang	5	7^{7}	1
(Australia) K Birrell	7	6^{2}	6
PR	(Latvia) A Sevastova	3	3
LL	(China) Y Yuan	6	6
WC	(Netherlands) A Koevermans	3	4
(Greece) M Sakkari	6	6
(Bulgaria) V Tomova	4	0
3	(Belgium) E Mertens	6	6
8	V Kudermetova	6	6
P Kudermetova	3	3
(United States) D Collins	6	1	2
(Belgium) G Minnen	4	6	6
(Czech Republic) K Siniaková	3	1
A Blinkova	6	6
Q	(Georgia (country)) M Bolkvadze	3	4
2	E Alexandrova	6	6

Second round
(Australia) K Birrell	4	3
LL	(China) Y Yuan	6	6
(Greece) M Sakkari	3	0
3	(Belgium) E Mertens	6	6
8	V Kudermetova	6	6
(Belgium) G Minnen	4	1
A Blinkova	0	5
2	E Alexandrova	6	7

Quarterfinals
LL	(China) Y Yuan	0	4
3	(Belgium) E Mertens	6	6
8	V Kudermetova	7	4	2
2	E Alexandrova	5	6	6

Semifinals
3	(Belgium) E Mertens	2	7^{9}	6
2	E Alexandrova	6	6^{7}	4

== Qualifying ==
=== Seeds ===
1. (Belgium) Greet Minnen (withdrew, still playing in Birmingham)
2. (Romania) Elena-Gabriela Ruse (qualified)
3. (China) Yuan Yue (qualifying competition, lucky loser)
4. (Hungary) Dalma Gálfi (qualifying competition)
5. Aliaksandra Sasnovich (qualifying competition)
6. (Germany) Ella Seidel (qualifying competition)
7. (United States) Robin Montgomery (withdrew)
8. (Germany) Jule Niemeier (first round)
9. (Poland) Katarzyna Kawa (qualifying competition)
10. (Serbia) Nina Stojanović (first round)
11. (Chinese Taipei) Joanna Garland (qualified)
12. (Georgia (country)) Mariam Bolkvadze (qualified)

=== Qualifiers ===
1. (Netherlands) Isis Louise van den Broek
2. (Romania) Elena-Gabriela Ruse
3. (Canada) Carson Branstine
4. (Georgia (country)) Mariam Bolkvadze
5. (Chinese Taipei) Joanna Garland
6. (Belgium) Yanina Wickmayer

=== Lucky loser ===
1. (China) Yuan Yue

=== Qualifying draw ===
==== First qualifier ====
First round
Alt	(Ukraine) Nadiia Kolb	5	3
WC	(Netherlands) Isis Louise van den Broek	7	6
(Netherlands) Lian Tran	6	6
10	(Serbia) Nina Stojanović	3	4

Qualifying competition
WC	(Netherlands) Isis Louise van den Broek	4	6	6
(Netherlands) Lian Tran	6	1	4

==== Second qualifier ====
First round
2	(Romania) Elena-Gabriela Ruse	6	6
PR	(Romania) Mihaela Buzărnescu	1	2
(Georgia (country)) Sofia Shapatava	6^{4}	3
9	(Poland) Katarzyna Kawa	7^{7}	6

Qualifying competition
2	(Romania) Elena-Gabriela Ruse	6	6
9	(Poland) Katarzyna Kawa	2	1

==== Third qualifier ====
First round
3	(China) Yuan Yue	7^{7}	6
(Netherlands) Joy de Zeeuw	6^{4}	4
(Canada) Carson Branstine	6	7^{7}
8	(Germany) Jule Niemeier	3	6^{2}

Qualifying competition
3	(China) Yuan Yue	4	4
(Canada) Carson Branstine	6	6

==== Fourth qualifier ====
First round
4	(Hungary) Dalma Gálfi	6^{4}	6	6
(Slovakia) Renáta Jamrichová	7^{7}	4	4
WC	(Netherlands) Loes Ebeling Koning	3	2
12	(Georgia (country)) Mariam Bolkvadze	6	6

Qualifying competition
4	(Hungary) Dalma Gálfi	6^{5}	1
12	(Georgia (country)) Mariam Bolkvadze	7^{7}	6

==== Fifth qualifier ====
First round
5	Aliaksandra Sasnovich	6	6^{6}	6
(United States) Maria Mateas	0	7^{8}	2
Ekaterina Yashina	3	2
11	(Chinese Taipei) Joanna Garland	6	6

Qualifying competition
5	Aliaksandra Sasnovich	0	3
11	(Chinese Taipei) Joanna Garland	6	6

==== Sixth qualifier ====
First round
6	(Germany) Ella Seidel	6	5	7^{7}
WC	(Netherlands) Sarah van Emst	3	7	6^{2}
PR	(Belgium) Yanina Wickmayer	6	6
Alt	(United States) Jessica Failla	3	3

Qualifying competition
6	(Germany) Ella Seidel	4	1
PR	(Belgium) Yanina Wickmayer	6	6
