= 2026 Libéma Open – Women's singles =

Women's singles
- 2026 Libéma Open

Final
- Champion: (United States) Robin Montgomery
- Runner-up: (Czech Republic) Barbora Krejčíková
- Score: Walkover

Details
- Draw: 32 (4 Q / 3 WC )
- Seeds: 8

Events
Singles	men	women
Doubles	men	women
- Libéma Open

Robin Montgomery won the women's singles tennis title at the 2026 Libéma Open after Barbora Krejčíková withdrew from the final due to illness. It was her first WTA Tour title.

Ranked No. 484, Montgomery became the lowest-ranked woman to win a WTA Tour title on grass courts, the sixth lowest-ranked titlist in WTA Tour history, and the first player to win a final by a walkover since Victoria Azarenka in 2020.

Elise Mertens was the defending champion, but lost in the second round to Elena-Gabriela Ruse in a rematch of the previous year's final.

== Seeds ==
1. Ekaterina Alexandrova (first round)
2. (Denmark) Clara Tauson (first round)
3. (Belgium) Elise Mertens (second round)
4. (United States) Emma Navarro (first round)
5. (Austria) Anastasia Potapova (second round, retired)
6. (Czech Republic) Sára Bejlek (first round)
7. (Indonesia) Janice Tjen (first round)
8. (Czech Republic) Barbora Krejčíková (final, withdrew)

== Draw ==
Key

- Q = Qualifier
- WC = Wild card
- LL = Lucky loser
- Alt = Alternate
- ITF = ITF entry
- PR = Protected ranking
- SR = Special ranking
- SE = Special exempt
- JE = Junior exempt
- JR = Junior Accelerator Programme entrant
- CO = College Accelerator Programme entrant
- NG = Next Gen Accelerator Program entrant
- w/o = Walkover
- r = Retired
- d = Defaulted

=== Finals ===
Semifinals
Q	(United States) Robin Montgomery	6	6
(Australia) Ajla Tomljanović	4	2
8	(Czech Republic) Barbora Krejčíková	6	7^{7}
(Poland) Magda Linette	3	6^{4}

Final
Q	(United States) Robin Montgomery	w/o
8	(Czech Republic) Barbora Krejčíková

=== Top half ===
First round
1	E Alexandrova	4	6^{5}
(Hungary) P Udvardy	6	7^{7}
(Ukraine) D Snigur	6	7^{7}
WC	(Spain) P Badosa	1	6^{2}
(Australia) D Kasatkina	7	0	4
Q	(United States) R Montgomery	5	6	6
Q	(Belgium) G Minnen	7^{7}	6
7	(Indonesia) J Tjen	6^{4}	1
4	(United States) E Navarro	6	0	4
(United States) C McNally	4	6	6
(France) L Boisson	4	7	3
(Argentina) S Sierra	6	5	6
(Spain) J Bouzas Maneiro	3	1
(Australia) A Tomljanović	6	6
(Ukraine) D Yastremska	6	6
6	(Czech Republic) S Bejlek	1	2

Second round
(Hungary) P Udvardy	4	6	4
(Ukraine) D Snigur	6	3	6
Q	(United States) R Montgomery	6	7^{7}
Q	(Belgium) G Minnen	4	6^{4}
(United States) C McNally	6	6
(Argentina) S Sierra	4	3
(Australia) A Tomljanović	4	6	7
(Ukraine) D Yastremska	6	4	5

Quarterfinals
(Ukraine) D Snigur	4	4
Q	(United States) R Montgomery	6	6
(United States) C McNally	4	4
(Australia) A Tomljanović	6	6

Semifinals
Q	(United States) R Montgomery	6	6
(Australia) A Tomljanović	4	2

=== Bottom half ===
First round
8	(Czech Republic) B Krejčíková	6	6
(Mexico) R Zarazúa	1	2
(Czech Republic) N Bartůňková	6	6^{5}	5
Q	(Belgium) H Vandewinkel	4	7^{7}	7
(Germany) T Korpatsch	4	6^{5}
(Romania) E-G Ruse	6	7^{7}
WC	(Canada) B Andreescu	1	2
3	(Belgium) E Mertens	6	6
5	(Austria) A Potapova	6^{5}	6	6
WC	(Netherlands) S Lamens	7^{7}	4	4
Q	(United States) K Volynets	3	6	3
(Turkey) Z Sönmez	6	2	6
(Poland) M Linette	2	6	6
(Australia) K Birrell	6	1	2
WC	(Slovakia) M Pohánková	6	6
2	(Denmark) C Tauson	4	4

Second round
8	(Czech Republic) B Krejčíková	6	6
Q	(Belgium) H Vandewinkel	1	4
(Romania) E-G Ruse	6	6
3	(Belgium) E Mertens	3	3
5	(Austria) A Potapova	1	0^{r}
(Turkey) Z Sönmez	6	2
(Poland) M Linette	6	6
WC	(Slovakia) M Pohánková	2	2

Quarterfinals
8	(Czech Republic) B Krejčíková	6	6
(Romania) E-G Ruse	1	2
(Turkey) Z Sönmez	4	2
(Poland) M Linette	6	6

Semifinals
8	(Czech Republic) B Krejčíková	6	7^{7}
(Poland) M Linette	3	6^{4}

== Qualifying ==
=== Seeds ===
1. (Germany) Ella Seidel (qualifying competition)
2. (Belgium) Hanne Vandewinkel (qualified)
3. (United States) Katie Volynets (qualified)
4. (China) Yuan Yue (first round)
5. (China) Zhu Lin (qualifying competition)
6. (Chinese Taipei) Joanna Garland (qualifying competition)
7. (Netherlands) Anouk Koevermans (qualifying competition)
8. (Bulgaria) Viktoriya Tomova (first round)

=== Qualifiers ===
1. (Belgium) Greet Minnen
2. (Belgium) Hanne Vandewinkel
3. (United States) Katie Volynets
4. (United States) Robin Montgomery

=== Qualifying draw ===
==== First qualifier ====
First round
1	(Germany) Ella Seidel	7^{7}	6
(United States) Claire Liu	6^{5}	3
(Belgium) Greet Minnen	6	6
8	(Bulgaria) Viktoriya Tomova	1	1

Qualifying competition
1	(Germany) Ella Seidel	1	6	0
(Belgium) Greet Minnen	6	2	6

==== Second qualifier ====
First round
2	(Belgium) Hanne Vandewinkel	6	6
(Germany) Mona Barthel	3	3
WC	(Netherlands) Anouck Vrancken Peeters	2	0
7	(Netherlands) Anouk Koevermans	6	6

Qualifying competition
2	(Belgium) Hanne Vandewinkel	6	6
7	(Netherlands) Anouk Koevermans	0	4

==== Third qualifier ====
First round
3	(United States) Katie Volynets	6	6
(Japan) Nao Hibino	2	2
(United States) Carol Young Suh Lee	4	6	1
5	(China) Zhu Lin	6	4	6

Qualifying competition
3	(United States) Katie Volynets	6^{4}	7^{10}	6
5	(China) Zhu Lin	7^{7}	6^{8}	1

==== Fourth qualifier ====
First round
4	(China) Yuan Yue	7^{7}	6^{1}	1
PR	(United States) Robin Montgomery	6^{4}	7^{7}	6
WC	(Netherlands) Britt du Pree	4	5
6	(Chinese Taipei) Joanna Garland	6	7

Qualifying competition
PR	(United States) Robin Montgomery	7^{7}	6
6	(Chinese Taipei) Joanna Garland	6^{3}	3
