= 2023 Libéma Open – Women's doubles =

Women's doubles
- 2023 Libéma Open

Final
- Champions: (Japan) Shuko Aoyama (Japan) Ena Shibahara
- Runners-up: (Slovakia) Viktória Hrunčáková (Slovakia) Tereza Mihalíková
- Score: 6–3, 6–3

Details
- Draw: 16
- Seeds: 4

Events
| Singles | men | women |
| Doubles | men | women |
- Libéma Open

Shuko Aoyama and Ena Shibahara defeated Viktória Hrunčáková and Tereza Mihalíková in the final, 6–3, 6–3 to win the women's doubles tennis title at the 2023 Libéma Open.

Ellen Perez and Tamara Zidanšek were the reigning champions, but Zidanšek chose not to participate. Perez partnered with Nicole Melichar-Martinez, but lost in the quarterfinals to Greet Minnen and Yanina Wickmayer.

== Seeds ==
1. (Belgium) Elise Mertens / (Netherlands) Demi Schuurs (quarterfinals, withdrew)
2. (United States) Nicole Melichar-Martinez / (Australia) Ellen Perez (quarterfinals)
3. (Japan) Shuko Aoyama / (Japan) Ena Shibahara (champions)
4. Veronika Kudermetova / Liudmila Samsonova (first round)

== Draw ==
Key

- Q = Qualifier
- WC = Wild card
- LL = Lucky loser
- Alt = Alternate
- ITF = ITF entry
- PR = Protected ranking
- SR = Special ranking
- SE = Special exempt
- JE = Junior exempt
- JR = Junior Accelerator Programme entrant
- CO = College Accelerator Programme entrant
- NG = Next Gen Accelerator Program entrant
- w/o = Walkover
- r = Retired
- d = Defaulted

=== Draw ===
First round
1 | (Belgium) E Mertens (Netherlands) D Schuurs | 6 | 6
(United States) A Krueger (New Zealand) E Routliffe | 2 | 2
(Georgia (country)) O Kalashnikova; A Sasnovich | 6 | 6
WC | (Netherlands) L Pattinama Kerkhove (Netherlands) B Schoofs | 2 | 4
4 | V Kudermetova; L Samsonova | 6^{5} | 7^{7} | [8]
WC | (Netherlands) L Stevens (Netherlands) E Vedder | 7^{7} | 6^{5} | [10]
(Slovakia) V Hrunčáková (Slovakia) T Mihalíková | 7 | 6
(Japan) M Kato (Indonesia) A Sutjiadi | 5 | 2
(Netherlands) R van der Hoek (Czech Republic) R Voráčová | 4 | 4
E Alexandrova (China) Z Yang | 6 | 6
(Czech Republic) M Kolodziejová; A Panova | 3 | 3
3 | (Japan) S Aoyama (Japan) E Shibahara | 6 | 6
(Belgium) G Minnen (Belgium) Y Wickmayer | 6 | 6
(Czech Republic) A Dețiuc (Czech Republic) J Malečková | 2 | 2
(Belgium) Y Bonaventure (Belgium) K Flipkens | 3 | 2
2 | (United States) N Melichar-Martinez (Australia) E Perez | 6 | 6

Quarterfinals
1 | (Belgium) E Mertens (Netherlands) D Schuurs
(Georgia (country)) O Kalashnikova; A Sasnovich | w/o
WC | (Netherlands) L Stevens (Netherlands) E Vedder | 7 | 2 | [7]
(Slovakia) V Hrunčáková (Slovakia) T Mihalíková | 5 | 6 | [10]
E Alexandrova (China) Z Yang | 7 | 6^{4} | [8]
3 | (Japan) S Aoyama (Japan) E Shibahara | 5 | 7^{7} | [10]
(Belgium) G Minnen (Belgium) Y Wickmayer | 7^{7} | 2 | [10]
2 | (United States) N Melichar-Martinez (Australia) E Perez | 6^{3} | 6 | [8]

Semifinals
(Georgia (country)) O Kalashnikova; A Sasnovich | 5 | 6 | [4]
(Slovakia) V Hrunčáková (Slovakia) T Mihalíková | 7 | 4 | [10]
3 | (Japan) S Aoyama (Japan) E Shibahara | 6 | 6
(Belgium) G Minnen (Belgium) Y Wickmayer | 4 | 3

Final
(Slovakia) V Hrunčáková (Slovakia) T Mihalíková | 3 | 3
3 | (Japan) S Aoyama (Japan) E Shibahara | 6 | 6
