= 2024 Libéma Open =

- Date: 10–16 June
- Edition: 33rd
- Category: ATP Tour 250; WTA 250
- Draw: 28S / 16D (men); 32S / 16D (women)
- Prize money: €690,135 (ATP) $267,082 (WTA)
- Surface: Grass
- Location: Rosmalen, 's-Hertogenbosch, Netherlands

Champions

Men's singles
- (Australia) Alex de Minaur

Women's singles
- Liudmila Samsonova

Men's doubles
- (United States) Nathaniel Lammons / (United States) Jackson Withrow

Women's doubles
- (Estonia) Ingrid Neel / (Netherlands) Bibiane Schoofs
- Rosmalen Grass Court Championships

The 2024 Libéma Open was a professional tennis tournament played on outdoor grass courts at Autotron Rosmalen in Rosmalen, 's-Hertogenbosch, Netherlands from 10 to 16 June 2024. It was the 33rd edition of the Rosmalen Grass Court Championships and is classified as an ATP 250 event on the 2024 ATP Tour and a WTA 250 event on the 2024 WTA Tour.

== Champions ==
=== Men's singles ===
- (Australia) Alex de Minaur def. (United States) Sebastian Korda, 6–2, 6–4

=== Women's singles ===
- Liudmila Samsonova def. (Canada) Bianca Andreescu 4–6, 6–3, 7–5

=== Men's doubles ===
- (United States) Nathaniel Lammons / (United States) Jackson Withrow def. (Netherlands) Wesley Koolhof / (Croatia) Nikola Mektić, 7–6^{(7–5)}, 7–6^{(7–3)}

=== Women's doubles ===
- (Estonia) Ingrid Neel / (Netherlands) Bibiane Schoofs def. (Slovakia) Tereza Mihalíková / (United Kingdom) Olivia Nicholls 7–6^{(8–6)}, 6–3

== ATP singles main draw entrants ==
=== Seeds ===
Country	Player	Rank^{1}	Seed
AUS	Alex de Minaur	9	1
USA	Tommy Paul	12	2
FRA	Ugo Humbert	16	3
	Karen Khachanov	18	4
FRA	Adrian Mannarino	22	5
NED	Tallon Griekspoor	25	6
USA	Sebastian Korda	28	7
AUS	Jordan Thompson	36	8

- ^{1} Rankings are as of 27 May 2024.

=== Other entrants ===
The following players received wildcards into the main draw:

- (Belgium) David Goffin
- (Netherlands) Botic van de Zandschulp
- (Netherlands) Tim van Rijthoven

The following player received entry using a protected ranking into the main draw:

- (Canada) Milos Raonic

The following players received entry from the qualifying draw:

- (Netherlands) Gijs Brouwer
- (Switzerland) Marc-Andrea Hüsler
- (Italy) Stefano Napolitano
- (Australia) Tristan Schoolkate

The following player received entry as a lucky loser:

- (Belgium) Zizou Bergs

=== Withdrawals ===
- (Canada) Félix Auger-Aliassime → replaced by (Australia) Rinky Hijikata
- (Spain) Roberto Carballés Baena → replaced by (Belgium) Zizou Bergs
- (Spain) Pedro Martínez → replaced by (Australia) Max Purcell
- Daniil Medvedev → replaced by (Italy) Luca Nardi
- (Australia) Christopher O'Connell → replaced by (Spain) Roberto Bautista Agut
- (Kazakhstan) Alexander Shevchenko → replaced by (Australia) Aleksandar Vukic

== ATP doubles main draw entrants ==
=== Seeds ===
Country	Player	Country	Player	Rank^{1}	Seed
NED	Wesley Koolhof	CRO	Nikola Mektić	31	1
USA	Nathaniel Lammons	USA	Jackson Withrow	50	2
CRO	Ivan Dodig	GBR	Henry Patten	58	3
AUS	Max Purcell	AUS	Jordan Thompson	69	4

- ^{1} Rankings are as of 27 May 2024.

=== Other entrants ===
The following pairs received wildcards into the doubles main draw:

- (Netherlands) Tallon Griekspoor / (Netherlands) David Pel
- (Australia) Rinky Hijikata / (United States) Mackenzie McDonald

The following pair received entry as alternates:

- (Belgium) Zizou Bergs / (Belgium) David Goffin

=== Withdrawals ===
- (Croatia) Ivan Dodig / (United States) Austin Krajicek → replaced by (Croatia) Ivan Dodig / (United Kingdom) Henry Patten
- (Spain) Roberto Carballés Baena / (Spain) Pedro Martínez → replaced by (Belgium) Zizou Bergs / (Belgium) David Goffin
- (Ecuador) Gonzalo Escobar / (Kazakhstan) Aleksandr Nedovyesov → replaced by (Netherlands) Sander Arends / (Netherlands) Matwé Middelkoop
- (Belgium) Sander Gillé / (Belgium) Joran Vliegen → replaced by (United States) Ryan Seggerman / (United States) Patrik Trhac
- (Mexico) Santiago González / (Netherlands) Robin Haase → replaced by (Netherlands) Robin Haase / (Tunisia) Skander Mansouri
- (Finland) Harri Heliövaara / (United Kingdom) Henry Patten → replaced by (Monaco) Romain Arneodo / (Austria) Sam Weissborn
- (Monaco) Hugo Nys / (Poland) Jan Zieliński → replaced by (United States) Evan King / (United States) Reese Stalder
- (United States) Rajeev Ram / (United Kingdom) Joe Salisbury → replaced by (Italy) Stefano Napolitano / (Italy) Luca Nardi

== WTA singles main draw entrants ==
=== Seeds ===
Country	Player	Rank^{1}	Seed
USA	Jessica Pegula	5	1
	Liudmila Samsonova	17	2
	Ekaterina Alexandrova	18	3
BEL	Elise Mertens	27	4
	Veronika Kudermetova	31	5
CHN	Yuan Yue	36	6
CRO	Donna Vekić	40	7
POL	Magda Linette	46	8

- ^{1} Rankings are as of 27 May 2024.

=== Other entrants ===
The following players received wildcards into the main draw:

- (Canada) Bianca Andreescu
- (Netherlands) Suzan Lamens
- (Switzerland) Céline Naef
- (Japan) Naomi Osaka

The following players received entry using a protected ranking into the singles main draw:

- (Serbia) Aleksandra Krunić
- (Belgium) Alison Van Uytvanck

The following players received entry from the qualifying draw:

- (Hungary) Dalma Gálfi
- (United States) Elizabeth Mandlik
- (United States) Robin Montgomery
- (France) Jessika Ponchet
- Aliaksandra Sasnovich
- (Netherlands) Eva Vedder

=== Withdrawals ===
- (Czech Republic) Marie Bouzková → replaced by (United States) Emina Bektas
- (France) Océane Dodin → replaced by (Germany) Jule Niemeier
- (United States) Emma Navarro → replaced by (Spain) Rebeka Masarova
- (Egypt) Mayar Sherif → replaced by (Belgium) Alison Van Uytvanck

== WTA doubles main draw entrants ==
=== Seeds ===
Country	Player	Country	Player	Rank^{1}	Seed
USA	Jessica Pegula	NED	Demi Schuurs	42	1
JPN	Shuko Aoyama	INA	Aldila Sutjiadi	57	2
JPN	Eri Hozumi	JPN	Makoto Ninomiya	102	3
	~~Ekaterina Alexandrova~~		~~Veronika Kudermetova~~	~~105~~	~~4~~

- ^{1} Rankings are as of 27 May 2024.

=== Other entrants ===
The following pairs received wildcards into the doubles main draw:

- (Netherlands) Isabelle Haverlag / (Netherlands) Michaëlla Krajicek
- (Netherlands) Suzan Lamens / (Netherlands) Eva Vedder

The following pair received entry as alternates:

- (China) Bai Zhuoxuan / (China) Yuan Yue

=== Withdrawals ===
- Ekaterina Alexandrova / Veronika Kudermetova → replaced by (China) Bai Zhuoxuan / (China) Yuan Yue
