= 2023 Libéma Open – Men's doubles =

Men's doubles
- 2023 Libéma Open

Final
- Champions: (Netherlands) Wesley Koolhof (United Kingdom) Neal Skupski
- Runners-up: (Ecuador) Gonzalo Escobar (Kazakhstan) Aleksandr Nedovyesov
- Score: 7–6^{(7–1)}, 6–2

Events
| Singles | men | women |
| Doubles | men | women |
- Libéma Open

Defending champions Wesley Koolhof and Neal Skupski defeated Gonzalo Escobar and Aleksandr Nedovyesov in the final, 7–6^{(7–1)}, 6–2, to win the men's doubles tennis title at the 2023 Rosmalen Grass Court Championships. Koolhof and Skupski reclaimed the ATP no. 1 doubles ranking by reaching the final.

== Seeds ==
1. (Netherlands) Wesley Koolhof / (United Kingdom) Neal Skupski (champions)
2. (El Salvador) Marcelo Arévalo / (Netherlands) Jean-Julien Rojer (first round)
3. (Monaco) Hugo Nys / (Poland) Jan Zieliński (first round)
4. (Australia) Rinky Hijikata / (Australia) Jason Kubler (quarterfinals)

== Draw ==
Key

- Q = Qualifier
- WC = Wild card
- LL = Lucky loser
- Alt = Alternate
- ITF = ITF entry
- PR = Protected ranking
- SR = Special ranking
- SE = Special exempt
- JE = Junior exempt
- JR = Junior Accelerator Programme entrant
- CO = College Accelerator Programme entrant
- NG = Next Gen Accelerator Program entrant
- w/o = Walkover
- r = Retired
- d = Defaulted

=== Draw ===
First round
1 | (Netherlands) W Koolhof (United Kingdom) N Skupski | 4 | 7^{7} | [10]
WC | (Netherlands) M Middelkoop (Netherlands) B Stevens | 6 | 6^{4} | [7]
(United States) N Lammons (United States) J Withrow | 6 | 3 | [10]
PR | (France) P-H Herbert (France) N Mahut | 3 | 6 | [4]
4 | (Australia) R Hijikata (Australia) J Kubler | 7^{8} | 7^{7}
WC | (Netherlands) S Arends (Netherlands) D Pel | 6^{6} | 6^{5}
(Italy) S Bolelli (Italy) A Vavassori | 3 | 4
(United States) M Cressy (France) F Martin | 6 | 6
(Australia) A de Minaur (Australia) J Thompson | 6 | 6
(Brazil) M Melo (Australia) J Peers | 4 | 4
(United States) B Nakashima (Finland) E Ruusuvuori | 6 | 6^{6} | [10]
3 | (Monaco) H Nys (Poland) J Zieliński | 4 | 7^{8} | [8]
(Kazakhstan) A Bublik (United States) M McDonald | 7^{7} | 3 | [9]
(Netherlands) T Griekspoor (Netherlands) R Haase | 6^{5} | 6 | [11]
(Ecuador) G Escobar (Kazakhstan) A Nedovyesov | 6 | 3 | [10]
2 | (El Salvador) M Arévalo (Netherlands) J-J Rojer | 4 | 6 | [6]

Quarterfinals
1 | (Netherlands) W Koolhof (United Kingdom) N Skupski | 7^{7} | 6^{5} | [10]
(United States) N Lammons (United States) J Withrow | 6^{4} | 7^{7} | [3]
4 | (Australia) R Hijikata (Australia) J Kubler | 4 | 6^{5}
(United States) M Cressy (France) F Martin | 6 | 7^{7}
(Australia) A de Minaur (Australia) J Thompson | 6 | 6
(United States) B Nakashima (Finland) E Ruusuvuori | 2 | 4
(Netherlands) T Griekspoor (Netherlands) R Haase | 3 | 4
(Ecuador) G Escobar (Kazakhstan) A Nedovyesov | 6 | 6

Semifinals
1 | (Netherlands) W Koolhof (United Kingdom) N Skupski | 6 | 6
(United States) M Cressy (France) F Martin | 2 | 2
(Australia) A de Minaur (Australia) J Thompson
(Ecuador) G Escobar (Kazakhstan) A Nedovyesov | w/o

Final
1 | (Netherlands) W Koolhof (United Kingdom) N Skupski | 7^{7} | 6
(Ecuador) G Escobar (Kazakhstan) A Nedovyesov | 6^{1} | 2
