= 2025 Libéma Open – Men's singles =

Men's singles
- 2025 Libéma Open

Final
- Champion: (Canada) Gabriel Diallo
- Runner-up: (Belgium) Zizou Bergs
- Score: 7–5, 7–6^{(10–8)}

Details
- Draw: 28 (4 Q / 3 WC )
- Seeds: 8

Events
Singles	men	women
Doubles	men	women
- Libéma Open

Gabriel Diallo defeated Zizou Bergs in the final, 7–5, 7–6^{(10–8)} to win the men's singles tennis title at the 2025 Libéma Open. It was his first ATP Tour title, and he saved two match points en route, in the second round against Jordan Thompson.

Alex de Minaur was the reigning champion, but withdrew before the tournament.

== Seeds ==
The top four seeds received a bye into the second round.

1. Daniil Medvedev (quarterfinals)
2. (France) Ugo Humbert (semifinals)
3. Karen Khachanov (quarterfinals)
4. (Australia) Alexei Popyrin (second round)
5. (Poland) Hubert Hurkacz (second round, withdrew)
6. (Australia) Jordan Thompson (second round)
7. (Portugal) Nuno Borges (quarterfinals)
8. (Italy) Luciano Darderi (first round)

== Draw ==
Key

- Q = Qualifier
- WC = Wild card
- LL = Lucky loser
- Alt = Alternate
- ITF = ITF entry
- PR = Protected ranking
- SR = Special ranking
- SE = Special exempt
- JE = Junior exempt
- JR = Junior Accelerator Programme entrant
- CO = College Accelerator Programme entrant
- NG = Next Gen Accelerator Program entrant
- w/o = Walkover
- r = Retired
- d = Defaulted

=== Finals ===
Semifinals
LL	(United States) Reilly Opelka	1	4
(Belgium) Zizou Bergs	6	6
(Canada) Gabriel Diallo	6	7^{7}
2	(France) Ugo Humbert	3	6^{4}

Final
(Belgium) Zizou Bergs	5	6^{8}
(Canada) Gabriel Diallo	7	7^{10}

=== Top half ===
First round
LL	(France) A Mannarino	6	6
(Australia) C O'Connell	1	3
LL	(United States) R Opelka	6^{5}	7^{7}	6
WC	(Netherlands) J de Jong	7^{7}	6^{5}	2
(Chile) N Jarry	5	6	7^{7}
8	(Italy) L Darderi	7	4	6^{3}
(Belgium) Z Bergs	6	1	7^{7}
Q	(Belgium) A Blockx	3	6	6^{3}
(Serbia) L Djere	2	4
Q	(Estonia) M Lajal	6	6
(Spain) R Bautista Agut	6^{2}	4
5	(Poland) H Hurkacz	7^{7}	6

Second round
1	D Medvedev	7^{8}	6
LL	(France) A Mannarino	6^{6}	4
LL	(United States) R Opelka	7^{7}	6
(Chile) N Jarry	6^{5}	3
4	(Australia) A Popyrin	7^{7}	2	6^{3}
(Belgium) Z Bergs	6^{3}	6	7^{7}
Q	(Estonia) M Lajal	w/o
5	(Poland) H Hurkacz

Quarterfinals
1	D Medvedev	6^{5}	6^{5}
LL	(United States) R Opelka	7^{7}	7^{7}
(Belgium) Z Bergs	7^{7}	7^{7}
Q	(Estonia) M Lajal	6^{2}	6^{4}

Semifinals
LL	(United States) R Opelka	1	4
(Belgium) Z Bergs	6	6

=== Bottom half ===
First round
6	(Australia) J Thompson	6	6
(United States) A Kovacevic	4	4
(Canada) G Diallo	7	7^{7}
(Australia) A Vukic	5	6^{2}
Q	(United States) M McDonald	6	6^{4}	6
(Italy) M Bellucci	1	7^{7}	3
7	(Portugal) N Borges	7^{7}	6
NG	(United States) N Basavareddy	6^{2}	2
WC	(Finland) O Virtanen	7^{8}	7
(Argentina) TM Etcheverry	6^{6}	5
(Australia) R Hijikata	6	4	3
Q	(United Kingdom) D Evans	3	6	6

Second round
6	(Australia) J Thompson	6	1	5
(Canada) G Diallo	4	6	7
Q	(United States) M McDonald	3	7	6^{4}
3	K Khachanov	6	5	7^{7}
7	(Portugal) N Borges	w/o
WC	(Finland) O Virtanen
Q	(United Kingdom) D Evans	5	3
2	(France) U Humbert	7	6

Quarterfinals
(Canada) G Diallo	7^{8}	6
3	K Khachanov	6^{6}	4
7	(Portugal) N Borges	1	4
2	(France) U Humbert	6	6

Semifinals
(Canada) G Diallo	6	7^{7}
2	(France) U Humbert	3	6^{4}

== Qualifying ==
=== Seeds ===
1. (Australia) Adam Walton (first round)
2. (United States) Reilly Opelka (qualifying competition, lucky loser)
3. (United States) Mackenzie McDonald (qualified)
4. (France) Adrian Mannarino (qualifying competition, lucky loser)
5. (Belgium) Alexander Blockx (qualified)
6. (Australia) James McCabe (first round)
7. (Netherlands) Guy den Ouden (withdrew, still playing in Bad Rappenau)
8. (Estonia) Mark Lajal (qualified)

=== Qualifiers ===
1. (United Kingdom) Dan Evans
2. (Estonia) Mark Lajal
3. (United States) Mackenzie McDonald
4. (Belgium) Alexander Blockx

=== Lucky losers ===
1. (France) Adrian Mannarino
2. (United States) Reilly Opelka

=== Qualifying draw ===
==== First qualifier ====
First round
1	(Australia) Adam Walton	2	6	3
(United Kingdom) Dan Evans	6	2	6
WC	(Netherlands) Mees Röttgering	6	6
Alt	(Netherlands) Jelle Sels	4	2

Qualifying competition
(United Kingdom) Dan Evans	6	6^{5}	6
WC	(Netherlands) Mees Röttgering	3	7^{7}	2

==== Second qualifier ====
First round
2	(United States) Reilly Opelka	6	7^{8}
(Kazakhstan) Denis Yevseyev	1	6^{6}
(France) Corentin Denolly	2	1
8	(Estonia) Mark Lajal	6	6

Qualifying competition
2	(United States) Reilly Opelka	6^{3}	3
8	(Estonia) Mark Lajal	7^{7}	6

==== Third qualifier ====
First round
3	(United States) Mackenzie McDonald	6	6
(United Kingdom) Ryan Peniston	3	3
WC	(Netherlands) Thijs Boogaard	7^{7}	4	7^{7}
6	(Australia) James McCabe	6^{3}	6	6^{4}

Qualifying competition
3	(United States) Mackenzie McDonald	7^{7}	6
WC	(Netherlands) Thijs Boogaard	6^{4}	1

==== Fourth qualifier ====
First round
4	(France) Adrian Mannarino	6	6
Alt	(Brazil) Daniel Dutra da Silva	1	1
(Netherlands) Max Houkes	2	0
5	(Belgium) Alexander Blockx	6	6

Qualifying competition
4	(France) Adrian Mannarino	3	6	6^{6}
5	(Belgium) Alexander Blockx	6	3	7^{8}
