= 2023 Libéma Open – Women's singles =

Women's singles
- 2023 Libéma Open

Final
- Champion: Ekaterina Alexandrova
- Runner-up: Veronika Kudermetova
- Score: 4–6, 6–4, 7–6^{(7–3)}

Details
- Draw: 32 (6 Q / 3 WC )
- Seeds: 8

Events
Singles	men	women
Doubles	men	women
- Libéma Open

Defending champion Ekaterina Alexandrova defeated Veronika Kudermetova in the final, 4–6, 6–4, 7–6^{(7–3)} to win the women's singles tennis title at the 2023 Libéma Open. Alexandrova lost just one set en route to the title, to Kudermetova in the final, ending a winning streak of 18 consecutive sets at the tournament. It was the longest final of the year on the WTA Tour, lasting 2 hours, 52 minutes.

Alexandrova became the first player to defend the title at 's-Hertogenbosch since Tamarine Tanasugarn in 2009, and just the second player to defend the title overall. Furthermore, she became the first player to defend a WTA Tour grass court title since Petra Kvitová at the 2018 Birmingham Classic.

== Seeds ==
1. Veronika Kudermetova (final)
2. Liudmila Samsonova (quarterfinals, retired)
3. Victoria Azarenka (second round)
4. Ekaterina Alexandrova (champion)
5. (Belgium) Elise Mertens (withdrew)
6. (Canada) Bianca Andreescu (second round)
7. Aliaksandra Sasnovich (semifinals)
8. (United States) Caty McNally (second round)

== Draw ==
Key

- Q = Qualifier
- WC = Wild card
- LL = Lucky loser
- Alt = Alternate
- ITF = ITF entry
- PR = Protected ranking
- SR = Special ranking
- SE = Special exempt
- JE = Junior exempt
- JR = Junior Accelerator Programme entrant
- CO = College Accelerator Programme entrant
- NG = Next Gen Accelerator Program entrant
- w/o = Walkover
- r = Retired
- d = Defaulted

=== Finals ===
Semifinals
1	Veronika Kudermetova	6	6
(Slovakia) Viktória Hrunčáková	3	2
4	Ekaterina Alexandrova	6	7^{7}
7	Aliaksandra Sasnovich	1	6^{1}

Final
1	Veronika Kudermetova	6	4	6^{3}
4	Ekaterina Alexandrova	4	6	7^{7}

=== Top half ===
First round
1	V Kudermetova	6	3
(United States) A Riske-Amritraj	3	0^{r}
(Belgium) Y Bonaventure	6^{3}	6^{4}
Q	(Canada) C Zhao	7^{7}	7^{7}
WC	(Switzerland) C Naef	3	7^{7}	6
WC	(United States) V Williams	6	6^{3}	2
(United States) K Volynets	2	1
8	(United States) C McNally	6	6
3	V Azarenka	7^{7}	6
Q	(Serbia) N Stevanović	6^{5}	3
(Sweden) R Peterson	1	2
(United States) A Krueger	6	6
Q	(Switzerland) S Bandecchi	4	2
(Slovakia) V Hrunčáková	6	6
Q	(Turkey) Z Sönmez	4	4
6	(Canada) B Andreescu	6	6

Second round
1	V Kudermetova	6	6
Q	(Canada) C Zhao	1	3
WC	(Switzerland) C Naef	3	6	6
8	(United States) C McNally	6	4	3
3	V Azarenka	3	2
(United States) A Krueger	6	6
(Slovakia) V Hrunčáková	7^{8}	6
6	(Canada) B Andreescu	6^{6}	3

Quarterfinals
1	V Kudermetova	6	6
WC	(Switzerland) C Naef	3	2
(United States) A Krueger	4	4
(Slovakia) V Hrunčáková	6	6

Semifinals
1	V Kudermetova	6	6
(Slovakia) V Hrunčáková	3	2

=== Bottom half ===
First round
LL	(United States) S Vickery	6	6
LL	(Australia) P Hon	3	0
Q	(United States) E Bektas	7	7^{7}
(Hungary) D Gálfi	5	6^{1}
WC	(Netherlands) L Pattinama Kerkhove	1	4
(Australia) K Birrell	6	6
PR	E Rodina	3	4
4	E Alexandrova	6	6
7	A Sasnovich	6	6
(Italy) L Stefanini	0	3
(Belgium) G Minnen	7	4	6
(France) J Ponchet	5	6	2
P Kudermetova	6	6
(China) Y Yuan	4	3
Q	(Germany) L Papadakis	5	7^{7}	6^{3}
2	L Samsonova	7	6^{5}	7^{7}

Second round
LL	(United States) S Vickery	4	4
Q	(United States) E Bektas	6	6
(Australia) K Birrell	4	6^{3}
4	E Alexandrova	6	7^{7}
7	A Sasnovich	6	4	6
(Belgium) G Minnen	2	6	3
P Kudermetova	4	1
2	L Samsonova	6	6

Quarterfinals
Q	(United States) E Bektas	4	4
4	E Alexandrova	6	6
7	A Sasnovich	7^{7}	3
2	L Samsonova	6^{4}	1^{r}

Semifinals
4	E Alexandrova	6	7^{7}
7	A Sasnovich	1	6^{1}

== Qualifying ==
=== Seeds ===
1. (Australia) Priscilla Hon (qualifying competition, lucky loser)
2. (United States) CoCo Vandeweghe (first round)
3. (United States) Sachia Vickery (qualifying competition, lucky loser)
4. (Canada) Carol Zhao (qualified)
5. (United States) Emina Bektas (qualified)
6. (Japan) Mai Hontama (qualifying competition)
7. (Belgium) Magali Kempen (first round)
8. (Slovenia) Dalila Jakupović (first round)
9. (India) Ankita Raina (qualifying competition)
10. (Serbia) Natalija Stevanović (qualified)
11. Kristina Dmitruk (qualifying competition)
12. (Turkey) Zeynep Sönmez (qualified)

=== Qualifiers ===
1. (Serbia) Natalija Stevanović
2. (Germany) Lena Papadakis
3. (Turkey) Zeynep Sönmez
4. (Canada) Carol Zhao
5. (United States) Emina Bektas
6. (Switzerland) Susan Bandecchi

=== Lucky losers ===
1. (Australia) Priscilla Hon
2. (United States) Sachia Vickery

=== Qualifying draw ===
==== First qualifier ====
First round
1	(Australia) Priscilla Hon	6	6
WC	(Netherlands) Anouk Koevermans	0	3
(Netherlands) Eva Vedder	7	2	3
10	(Serbia) Natalija Stevanović	5	6	6

Qualifying competition
1	(Australia) Priscilla Hon	6	2	6^{4}
10	(Serbia) Natalija Stevanović	4	6	7^{7}

==== Second qualifier ====
First round
2	(United States) CoCo Vandeweghe	3	2
(Germany) Lena Papadakis	6	6
WC	(Australia) Taylah Preston	6	2	7^{7}
8	(Slovenia) Dalila Jakupović	4	6	6^{5}

Qualifying competition
(Germany) Lena Papadakis	6	3	6
WC	(Australia) Taylah Preston	0	6	4

==== Third qualifier ====
First round
3	(United States) Sachia Vickery	6	6
(Czech Republic) Jesika Malečková	1	4
Ekaterina Makarova	6^{4}	2
12	(Turkey) Zeynep Sönmez	7^{7}	6

Qualifying competition
3	(United States) Sachia Vickery	6^{2}	6	2
12	(Turkey) Zeynep Sönmez	7^{7}	0	6

==== Fourth qualifier ====
First round
4	(Canada) Carol Zhao	6	6
(Netherlands) Lexie Stevens	1	4
(Germany) Sabine Lisicki	3	4
11	Kristina Dmitruk	6	6

Qualifying competition
4	(Canada) Carol Zhao	6	6
11	Kristina Dmitruk	1	3

==== Fifth qualifier ====
First round
5	(United States) Emina Bektas	7	6
(Japan) Miyu Kato	5	3
(Australia) Ellen Perez	3	5
9	(India) Ankita Raina	6	7

Qualifying competition
5	(United States) Emina Bektas	6	5	6
9	(India) Ankita Raina	3	7	3

==== Sixth qualifier ====
First round
6	(Japan) Mai Hontama	6	6
WC	(Netherlands) Jasmijn Gimbrère	1	4
(Switzerland) Susan Bandecchi	6^{5}	7^{7}	6
7/WC	(Belgium) Magali Kempen	7^{7}	6^{1}	4

Qualifying competition
6	(Japan) Mai Hontama	3	6	5
(Switzerland) Susan Bandecchi	6	3	7
