= 2026 Libéma Open =

- Date: 8–14 June
- Edition: 35th
- Category: ATP Tour 250; WTA 250
- Draw: 28S / 16D (men); 32S / 16D (women)
- Prize money: €723,435 (men) €246,388 (women)
- Surface: Grass
- Location: Rosmalen, 's-Hertogenbosch, Netherlands

Champions

Men's singles
- (Poland) Kamil Majchrzak

Women's singles
- (United States) Robin Montgomery

Men's doubles
- (Netherlands) Sander Arends / (Netherlands) David Pel

Women's doubles
- (Japan) Shuko Aoyama / (Chinese Taipei) Liang En-shuo
- Rosmalen Grass Court Championships

The 2026 Libéma Open was a professional tennis tournament played on outdoor grass courts at Autotron Rosmalen in Rosmalen, 's-Hertogenbosch, Netherlands from 8 to 14 June 2026. It was the 35th edition of the Rosmalen Grass Court Championships and is classified as an ATP 250 event on the 2026 ATP Tour and a WTA 250 event on the 2026 WTA Tour.

== Champions ==
=== Men's singles ===
- (Poland) Kamil Majchrzak def. (Australia) Alex de Minaur, 6–3, 2–6, 7–6^{(7–5)}

=== Women's singles ===
- (United States) Robin Montgomery def. (Czech Republic) Barbora Krejčíková, walkover

=== Men's doubles ===
- (Netherlands) Sander Arends / (Netherlands) David Pel def. (Belgium) Zizou Bergs / (France) Arthur Rinderknech, 7–6^{(8–6)}, 7–6^{(7–5)}

=== Women's doubles ===
- (Japan) Shuko Aoyama / (Chinese Taipei) Liang En-shuo def. (Estonia) Ingrid Neel / (Mexico) Giuliana Olmos, 6–2, 2–6, [10–7]

== ATP singles main draw entrants ==
=== Seeds ===
Country	Player	Rank^{1}	Seed
CAN	Félix Auger-Aliassime	6	1
AUS	Alex de Minaur	7	2
	Daniil Medvedev	8	3
FRA	Arthur Rinderknech	25	4
FRA	Ugo Humbert	32	5
NED	Tallon Griekspoor	33	6
CAN	Denis Shapovalov	39	7
BEL	Zizou Bergs	40	8

- ^{1} Rankings are as of 25 May 2026.

=== Other entrants ===
The following players received wildcards into the main draw:

- (Netherlands) Thijs Boogaard
- (Netherlands) Mees Röttgering
- (Finland) Otto Virtanen

The following player received a late entry into the main draw:

- (Australia) Alex de Minaur

The following player received entry using a protected ranking:

- (China) Zhang Zhizhen

The following players received entry from the qualifying draw:

- (France) Benjamin Bonzi
- (United States) Martin Damm
- (Australia) James McCabe
- (Sweden) Elias Ymer

=== Withdrawals ===
- (Belgium) Alexander Blockx → replaced by (United States) Jenson Brooksby
- (France) Arthur Fils → replaced by (Hungary) Márton Fucsovics
- (United Kingdom) Cameron Norrie → replaced by (China) Zhang Zhizhen

== ATP doubles main draw entrants ==
=== Seeds ===
Country	Player	Country	Player	Rank^{1}	Seed
FRA	Théo Arribagé	FRA	Albano Olivetti	56	1
USA	Robert Cash	USA	JJ Tracy	64	2
IND	Yuki Bhambri	NZL	Michael Venus	71	3
SWE	André Göransson	USA	Evan King	82	4

- ^{1} Rankings are as of 25 May 2026.

=== Other entrants ===
The following pairs received wildcards into the doubles main draw:

- (Belgium) Sander Gillé / (Netherlands) Sem Verbeek
- (Netherlands) Thijmen Loof / (Netherlands) Mick Veldheer

== WTA singles main draw entrants ==
=== Seeds ===
Country	Player	Rank^{1}	Seed
	Ekaterina Alexandrova	14	1
DEN	Clara Tauson	20	2
BEL	Elise Mertens	21	3
USA	Emma Navarro	25	4
AUT	Anastasia Potapova	30	5
CZE	Sára Bejlek	35	6
INA	Janice Tjen	40	7
CZE	Barbora Krejčiková	41	8

- ^{1} Rankings are as of 25 May 2026.

=== Other entrants ===
The following players received wildcards into the main draw:

- (Canada) Bianca Andreescu
- (Spain) Paula Badosa
- (Netherlands) Suzan Lamens
- (Slovakia) Mia Pohánková

The following players received entry from the qualifying draw:

- (Belgium) Greet Minnen
- (United States) Robin Montgomery
- (Belgium) Hanne Vandewinkel
- (United States) Katie Volynets

=== Withdrawals ===
- (Italy) Elisabetta Cocciaretto → replaced by (Australia) Ajla Tomljanović
- (Poland) Magdalena Fręch → replaced by (Ukraine) Daria Snigur
- (Australia) Maya Joint → replaced by (Czech Republic) Nikola Bartůňková
- (Croatia) Petra Marčinko → replaced by (Australia) Kimberly Birrell
- (Mexico) Renata Zarazúa → replaced by (Germany) Tamara Korpatsch

== WTA doubles main draw entrants ==
=== Seeds ===
Country	Player	Country	Player	Rank^{1}	Seed
CHN	Jiang Xinyu	CHN	Xu Yifan	80	1
INA	Aldila Sutjiadi	INA	Janice Tjen	87	2
	Ekaterina Alexandrova	AUS	Maya Joint	89	3
JPN	Eri Hozumi	TPE	Wu Fang-hsien	91	4

- ^{1} Rankings are as of 25 May 2026.

=== Other entrants ===
The following pairs received wildcards into the doubles main draw:

- (Canada) Bianca Andreescu / (France) Loïs Boisson
- (Netherlands) Anouk Koevermans / (Netherlands) Suzan Lamens

The following pair received entry as alternates:

- (Hungary) Panna Udvardy / (Mexico) Renata Zarazúa

=== Withdrawals ===
- (Czech Republic) Sára Bejlek / (Australia) Daria Kasatkina → replaced by (Hungary) Panna Udvardy / (Mexico) Renata Zarazúa
