= 2026 Libéma Open – Men's doubles =

Men's doubles
- 2026 Libéma Open

Final
- Champions: (Netherlands) Sander Arends (Netherlands) David Pel
- Runners-up: (Belgium) Zizou Bergs (France) Arthur Rinderknech
- Score: 7–6^{(8–6)}, 7–6^{(7–5)}

Details
- Draw: 16 (2 WC )
- Seeds: 4

Events
Singles	men	women
Doubles	men	women
- Libéma Open

Sander Arends and David Pel defeated Zizou Bergs and Arthur Rinderknech in the final, 7–6^{(8–6)}, 7–6^{(7–5)} to win the men's doubles tennis title at the 2026 Rosmalen Grass Court Championships. They were the first all-Dutch pair to win the title since 2001.

Matthew Ebden and Jordan Thompson were the reigning champions, but they did not participate this year.

== Seeds ==
1. (France) Théo Arribagé / (France) Albano Olivetti (quarterfinals)
2. (United States) Robert Cash / (United States) JJ Tracy (first round)
3. (India) Yuki Bhambri / (New Zealand) Michael Venus (first round)
4. (Sweden) André Göransson / (United States) Evan King (first round)

== Draw ==
Key

- Q = Qualifier
- WC = Wild card
- LL = Lucky loser
- Alt = Alternate
- ITF = ITF entry
- PR = Protected ranking
- SR = Special ranking
- SE = Special exempt
- JE = Junior exempt
- JR = Junior Accelerator Programme entrant
- CO = College Accelerator Programme entrant
- NG = Next Gen Accelerator Program entrant
- w/o = Walkover
- r = Retired
- d = Defaulted

First round
1	(France) T Arribagé (France) A Olivetti	6^{5}	7	[10]
(Portugal) N Borges (Australia) M Polmans	7^{7}	5	[7]
WC	(Belgium) S Gillé (Netherlands) S Verbeek	4	7^{7}	[10]
(Czech Republic) A Pavlásek (Czech Republic) P Rikl	6	6^{4}	[12]
4	(Sweden) A Göransson (United States) E King	6^{3}	6	[7]
(India) S Balaji (United States) R Ram	7^{7}	4	[10]
(Belgium) Z Bergs (France) A Rinderknech	4	7	[10]
(United States) R Galloway (Australia) J Peers	6	5	[3]
WC	(Netherlands) T Loof (Netherlands) M Veldheer	3	4
(Netherlands) S Arends (Netherlands) D Pel	6	6
PR	(Canada) G Diallo (Poland) H Hurkacz	3	6	[14]
3	(India) Y Bhambri (New Zealand) M Venus	6	4	[12]
(Canada) F Auger-Aliassime (Canada) D Shapovalov	6	7^{10}
(Czech Republic) P Nouza (Austria) N Oberleitner	3	6^{8}
(Netherlands) T Griekspoor (Netherlands) B van de Zandschulp	6	6
2	(United States) R Cash (United States) JJ Tracy	4	4

Quarterfinals
1	(France) T Arribagé (France) A Olivetti	5	6^{6}
(Czech Republic) A Pavlásek (Czech Republic) P Rikl	7	7^{8}
(India) S Balaji (United States) R Ram	5	6^{8}
(Belgium) Z Bergs (France) A Rinderknech	7	7^{10}
(Netherlands) S Arends (Netherlands) D Pel	7^{7}	4	[10]
PR	(Canada) G Diallo (Poland) H Hurkacz	6^{5}	6	[7]
(Canada) F Auger-Aliassime (Canada) D Shapovalov
(Netherlands) T Griekspoor (Netherlands) B van de Zandschulp	w/o

Semifinals
(Czech Republic) A Pavlásek (Czech Republic) P Rikl	7^{7}	6^{5}	[8]
(Belgium) Z Bergs (France) A Rinderknech	6^{1}	7^{7}	[10]
(Netherlands) S Arends (Netherlands) D Pel	6	7^{11}
(Netherlands) T Griekspoor (Netherlands) B van de Zandschulp	3	6^{9}

Final
(Belgium) Z Bergs (France) A Rinderknech	6^{6}	6^{5}
(Netherlands) S Arends (Netherlands) D Pel	7^{8}	7^{7}
