= Robin Montgomery =

American tennis player (born 2004)

- Montgomery at the 2026 US Open
- Country (sports): United States
- Residence: Washington, D.C., US
- Born: September 5, 2004 (age 22) Washington, DC
- Height: 1.78 m (5 ft 10 in)
- Turned pro: March 2019
- Plays: Left (two-handed backhand)
- Prize money: $1,934,795

Singles
- Career record: 153–101
- Career titles: 1 WTA, 3 ITF
- Highest ranking: No. 95 (June 9, 2025)
- Current ranking: No. 151 (November 2, 2026)

Grand Slam singles results
- Australian Open: Q2 (2023, 2025)
- French Open: 2R (2025)
- Wimbledon: 2R (2024)
- US Open: 1R (2020, 2023, 2026)

Doubles
- Career record: 52–33
- Career titles: 0 WTA, 4 ITF
- Highest ranking: No. 63 (October 12, 2026)
- Current ranking: No. 63 (November 2, 2026)

Grand Slam doubles results
- US Open: F (2026)

Grand Slam mixed doubles results
- US Open: 2R (2023)
- Last updated on: 8 November 2026.

Robin Montgomery (born September 5, 2004) is an American professional tennis player. She has a career-high WTA singles ranking of No. 95, reached on 9 June 2025 and a doubles ranking of world No. 63, achieved on 12 October 2026.

Montgomery was a finalist at the 2026 US Open with Ashlyn Krueger. She has won one WTA Tour singles title. She also won the junior singles and doubles titles at the 2021 US Open.

Montgomery made her WTA Tour debut at the 2020 US Open, receiving a wildcard into the women's singles main draw.

== Early life ==
Montgomery was born in Washington, D.C. and was raised by a single mother. She began playing tennis at the age of four, and currently trains at the Junior Tennis Champions Center in College Park, Maryland. She is of Jamaican descent through her father.

== Career ==
=== 2019: Orange Bowl winner ===
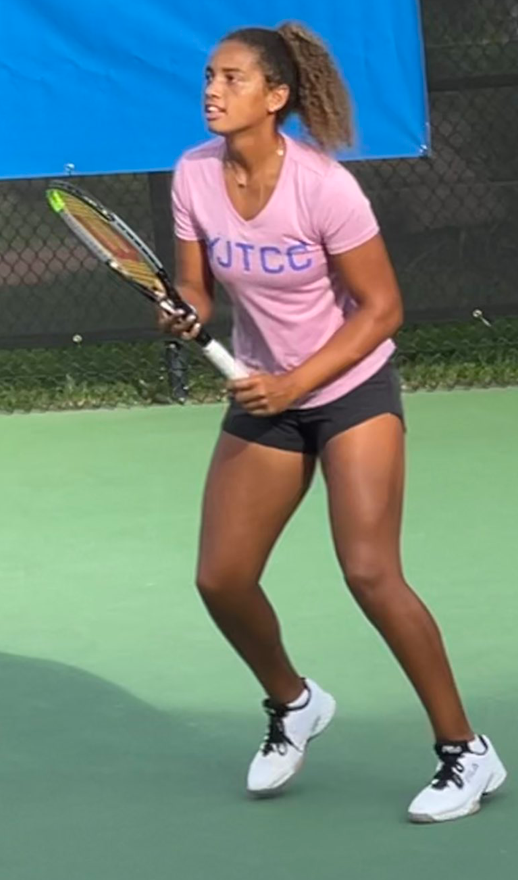
Montgomery in 2021

In August 2019, Montgomery competed in the girls' singles at the US Open where she reached the third round. In September, she represented the U.S. in the final of the Junior Fed Cup, teaming with Connie Ma to win the doubles match against the Czech Republic and secure victory for the US team. In December, she won the "18 and under" title in the 2019 Orange Bowl.

=== 2020: Turned pro, ITF Circuit title & major debut ===
Montgomery reached the quarterfinals of the 2020 Australian Open girls' singles tournament in January, and in March, she won her first ITF tournament, a $25k event in Las Vegas. As of August 2020, she was the No. 5 in the junior world rankings.

Following the break in the season caused by the COVID-19 pandemic, Montgomery took part in the Western & Southern Open as a wildcard entrant in the qualifying competition, losing in the first round to Sorana Cîrstea. The following week, she received a wildcard into the main draw of the 2020 US Open — her first Grand Slam appearance. She lost in the first round to Yulia Putintseva.

=== 2021–22: US Open junior singles, doubles titles, WTA 1000 debut ===
Montgomery made her WTA 1000 debut in the main-draw of the 2021 Miami Open as a wildcard entrant, but lost to Magda Linette. At the 2021 US Open, Montgomery defeated Kristina Dmitruk in straight sets in the girls' singles final to win her first major singles title. She followed this victory a few hours later with her first major doubles title. She and partner Ashlyn Krueger defeated fellow American duo, Reese Brantmeier and Elvina Kalieva, in three sets. Montgomery became the first girl to achieve the feat of winning both titles at the US Open since Michaëlla Krajicek in 2004, and was the first American to take the Junior singles title since Amanda Anisimova in 2017. At the same tournament, she also received a qualifying wildcard for the women's singles event.

Montgomery received a wildcard for the 2022 Miami Open. She qualified for the main-draw at the 2022 San Diego Open, but lost to sixth seed Coco Gauff in the first round.

=== 2023–24: First WTA Tour quarterfinal and major win ===
In February 2023, Montgomery qualified for the inaugural ATX Open in Austin, Texas, but lost to CoCo Vandeweghe in the first round. She received a wildcard entry for the main-draw of the Miami Open, where defeated Ana Bogdan for her first WTA 1000-level win, before losing to 19th seed Madison Keys in the second round.

In March 2024, she qualified for the main-draw in Indian Wells, but lost to Hailey Baptiste in the first round. At the Madrid Open, as a main-draw wildcard entrant, she reached the third round, losing to defending champion Aryna Sabalenka.

At the beginning of the 2024 grass-court season, Montgomery qualified for the Rosmalen Open and then reached her first tour-level quarterfinal defeating eighth seed Magda Linette and Jule Niemeier, before losing to third seed Ekaterina Alexandrova. Montgomery also qualified for the 2024 Wimbledon Championships, where she defeated Olivia Gadecki to make it into the second round, at which point she lost to 10th seed Ons Jabeur.

At the beginning of the American summer hardcourt swing, Montgomery reached her first WTA 500 quarterfinal at the Washington Open as a wildcard entrant, after defeating Shelby Rogers and receiving a walkover from fourth seed Ons Jabeur. She lost in the last eight to Marie Bouzková. Montgomery qualified for the main-draw at the Cincinnati Open, but lost to Elisabetta Cocciaretto in the first round.

=== 2025–26: Top 100, injury, maiden WTA Tour title, major doubles final ===
Montgomery at the 2026 Rosmalen Open - her first WTA Tour singles title

Montgomery started her 2025 season at the Auckland Open where she recorded wins over lucky loser Mai Hontama, qualifier Nao Hibino and Bernarda Pera to reach her first WTA Tour semifinal, at which point her run was ended by fifth seed and eventual champion Clara Tauson.

In March 2025, at the WTA 1000 event Indian Wells, where she received a wildcard entry, she defeated Jule Niemeier for her first win at the tournament, before losing to 18th seed Marta Kostyuk in the second round. At the Charleston Open, she overcame Viktoriya Tomova in the first round, but lost her next match to seventh seed Danielle Collins. Despite the defeat, Montgomery reached the top 100 on 7 April 2025. A wrist injury which required surgery kept her sidelined from June 2025 until April 2026.

Montgomery won her maiden WTA Tour title at the 2026 Rosmalen Open when Barbora Krejčíková withdrew from the final due to illness. Ranked No. 484, she was the lowest-ranked player to win a WTA Tour-level title on grass courts, and the fifth lowest-ranked titlist in WTA history. Having already come through two rounds of qualifying, she defeated Daria Kasatkina, fellow qualifier Greet Minnen, Daria Snigur and Ajla Tomljanović on her way to the final. As a result of winning the title, she climbed 290 places to 194 in the singles rankings on 15 June 2026.

Teaming up with Ashlyn Krueger as a wildcard pairing, Montgomery reached her first major final in doubles at the 2026 US Open, losing to top seeds Kateřina Siniaková and Taylor Townsend in three sets.

In November 2026, at the Chennai Open, she defeated fourth seed Panna Udvardy, Jeline Vandromme and wildcard entrant Maaya Rajeshwaran Revathi to make it through to the semifinals, where she lost to top seed and defending champion Janice Tjen.

== Performance timelines ==
Key
W	F	SF	QF	#R	RR	Q#	DNQ	A	NH

(W) winner; (F) finalist; (SF) semifinalist; (QF) quarterfinalist; (#R) rounds 4, 3, 2, 1; (RR) round-robin stage; (Q#) qualification round; (DNQ) did not qualify; (A) absent; (NH) not held; (SR) strike rate (events won / competed); (W–L) win–loss record.
To avoid confusion and double counting, these charts are updated at the conclusion of a tournament or when the player's participation has ended.

Only main-draw results in WTA Tour, Grand Slam tournaments, Billie Jean King Cup, United Cup, Hopman Cup and Olympic Games are included in win–loss records.

=== Singles ===
Current through the 2026 US Open.

Tournament	2020	2021	2022	2023	2024	2025	2026	SR	W–L	Win%
Grand Slam tournaments
Australian Open	A	A	A	Q2	A	Q2	A	0 / 0	0–0	–
French Open	A	A	A	Q1	Q3	2R	Q2	0 / 1	1–1	50%
Wimbledon	NH	A	A	Q2	2R	Q3	1R	0 / 2	1–2	33%
US Open	1R	Q1	A	1R	Q1	A	1R	0 / 3	0–3	0%
Win–loss	0–1	0–0	0–0	0–1	1–1	1–1	0–2	0 / 6	2–6	25%
WTA 1000 tournaments
Qatar Open	A	NTI	A	NTI	A	A	A	0 / 0	0–0	–
Dubai Championships	NTI	A	NTI	A	A	A	A	0 / 0	0–0	–
Indian Wells Open	NH	A	1R	Q1	1R	2R	A	0 / 3	1–3	25%
Miami Open	NH	1R	1R	2R	Q1	Q2	A	0 / 3	1–3	25%
Madrid Open	NH	A	A	A	3R	1R	1R	0 / 3	2–3	40%
Italian Open	A	A	A	A	A	A	A	0 / 0	0–0	–
Canadian Open	NH	A	A	A	Q1	A	A	0 / 0	0–0	–
Cincinnati Open	Q1	A	A	A	1R	A	Q2	0 / 1	0–1	0%
China Open	NH			A	A	A		0 / 0	0–0	–
Wuhan Open	NH				A	A		0 / 0	0–0	–
Guadalajara Open	NH		A	1R	Not Tier I			0 / 1	0–1	0%
Win–loss	0–0	0–1	0–2	1–2	2–3	1–2	0–1	0 / 11	4–11	27%
Career statistics
	2020	2021	2022	2023	2024	2025	2026	SR	W–L	Win%
Tournaments	1	1	3	4	9	5	5	Career total: 28		
Titles	0	0	0	0	0	0	1	Career total: 1		
Finals	0	0	0	0	0	0	1	Career total: 1		
Overall win-loss	0–1	0–1	0–3	1–4	6–9	6–5	4–4	0 / 28	17–27	39%
Year-end ranking	491	371	247	187	107	203		$1,906,195		

== Grand Slam tournaments finals ==
=== Doubles: 1 (runner-up) ===
Result	Year	Tournament	Surface	Partner	Opponents	Score
Loss	2026	US Open	Hard	(United States) Ashlyn Krueger	(Czech Republic) Kateřina Siniaková (United States) Taylor Townsend	7–5, 0–6, 2–6

== WTA Tour finals ==
=== Singles: 1 (title) ===
Legend WTA 250 (1–0)	Finals by surface Grass (1–0)

Result	W–L	Date	Tournament	Tier	Surface	Opponent	Score
Win	1–0	Jun 2026	Rosmalen Open, Netherlands	WTA 250	Grass	(Czech Republic) Barbora Krejčíková	w/o

=== Doubles: 1 (runner-up) ===
Legend Grand Slam (0–1)	Finals by surface Hard (0–1)

Result	W–L	Date	Tournament	Tier	Surface	Partner	Opponents	Score
Loss	0–1	Sep 2026	US Open, United States	Grand Slam	Hard	(United States) Ashlyn Krueger	(Czech Republic) Kateřina Siniaková (United States) Taylor Townsend	7–5, 0–6, 2–6

== ITF Circuit finals ==
=== Singles: 7 (3 titles, 4 runner-ups) ===
Legend W60 tournaments (2–1) W25 tournaments (1–3)	Finals by surface Hard (2–4) Clay (1–0)

Result	W–L	Date	Tournament	Tier	Surface	Opponent	Score
Win	1–0	Mar 2020	Las Vegas Open, US	W25	Hard	(China) You Xiaodi	2–6, 6–3, 6–4
Loss	1–1	Nov 2020	ITF Orlando, US	W25	Hard	(United States) Alycia Parks	6–3, 4–6, 2–6
Loss	1–2	Apr 2022	ITF Nottingham, UK	W25	Hard	(United Kingdom) Eden Silva	4–6, 4–6
Loss	1–3	Oct 2022	ITF Templeton Pro, US	W60	Hard	(United States) Madison Brengle	6–4, 4–6, 2–6
Win	2–3	Nov 2022	Calgary Challenger, Canada	W60	Hard (i)	(Poland) Urszula Radwańska	7–6^{(6)}, 7–5
Loss	2–4	Jan 2023	ITF Orlando, United States	W25	Hard	(United States) Peyton Stearns	2–6, 0–6
Win	3–4	May 2023	Open Saint-Gaudens, France	W60	Clay	(France) Alice Robbe	7–5, 6–4

=== Doubles: 6 (4 titles, 2 runner-ups) ===
Legend W100 tournaments (0–2) W60 tournaments (2–0) W25 tournaments (2–0)	Finals by surface Hard (4–0) Clay (0–2)

Result	W–L	Date	Tournament	Tier	Surface	Partner	Opponents	Score
Win	1–0	Oct 2020	ITF Reims, France	W25	Hard	(France) Séléna Janicijevic	(United Kingdom) Harriet Dart (United Kingdom) Sarah Beth Grey	w/o
Win	2–0	Jul 2021	ITF Evansville, United States	W25	Hard	(United States) Kylie Collins	(United States) Lauren Proctor (United States) Anna Ulyashchenko	5–7, 6–3, [10–2]
Win	3–0	Mar 2022	Arcadia Pro Open, US	W60	Hard	(United States) Ashlyn Krueger	(United Kingdom) Harriet Dart (Mexico) Giuliana Olmos	w/o
Win	4–0	Feb 2023	ITF Orlando Pro, US	W60	Hard	(United States) Ashlyn Krueger	(Netherlands) Arianne Hartono (Netherlands) Eva Vedder	7–5, 6–1
Loss	4–1	Apr 2023	ITF Charleston Pro, US	W100	Clay	(United States) Ashlyn Krueger	(United States) Sophie Chang (United States) Angela Kulikov	3–6, 4–6
Loss	4–2	May 2023	Bonita Springs Pro, US	W100	Clay	(United States) Ashlyn Krueger	(United States) Makenna Jones (United States) Jamie Loeb	7–5, 4–6, [2–10]

== Junior Grand Slam tournament finals ==
=== Singles: 1 (title) ===
Result	Year	Tournament	Surface	Opponent	Score
Win	2021	US Open	Hard	(Belarus) Kristina Dmitruk	6–2, 6–4

=== Doubles: 1 (title) ===
Result	Year	Tournament	Surface	Partner	Opponents	Score
Win	2021	US Open	Hard	(United States) Ashlyn Krueger	(United States) Reese Brantmeier (United States) Elvina Kalieva	5–7, 6–3, [10–4]

== Head-to-head records ==
=== Record against top 10 players ===
- Montgomery has a 0–3 record against players who were, at the time the match was played, ranked in the top 10.

== Notes ==
Sporting positions
Preceded by (United States) Coco Gauff	Orange Bowl Girls' Singles Champion; Category: 18 and under 2019	Succeeded by (United States) Ashlyn Krueger
