= 2010 WTA Tour Championships =

- Date: 26–31 October
- Edition: 40th (singles) / 35th (doubles)
- Draw: 8S / 4D
- Location: Doha, Qatar
- Venue: Khalifa International Tennis Complex

Champions

Singles
- (Belgium) Kim Clijsters

Doubles
- (Argentina) Gisela Dulko / (Italy) Flavia Pennetta
- WTA Finals

The 2010 WTA Tour Championships was held in Doha, Qatar from October 26 to October 31. It was the third and final time that the Khalifa International Tennis Complex hosted the WTA Tour Year-End Singles and Doubles Championships. In 2011 the competition will move to Istanbul, Turkey.

Serena Williams was the defending singles champion. She qualified again but withdrew due to a continuing foot injury.
Nuria Llagostera Vives and María José Martínez Sánchez were the defending doubles champions, but they didn't qualify this year.
Elena Dementieva announced her retirement from tennis in the tournament after 13 years of playing and two Grand Slam finals, as well as an Olympic gold medal.

== Finals ==
=== Singles ===
(Belgium) Kim Clijsters defeated (Denmark) Caroline Wozniacki, 6–3, 5–7, 6–3.

- It was Clijsters' fifth title of the year and 40th of her career. It was her third win at the event, also winning in 2002 and 2003.

=== Doubles ===
(Argentina) Gisela Dulko / (Italy) Flavia Pennetta defeated (Czech Republic) Květa Peschke / (Slovenia) Katarina Srebotnik, 7–5, 6–4.

== Qualified players ==
=== Singles ===
Race singles (as of October 25, 2010)
Rk	Player	Points	Tour	Date Qualified
1	Caroline Wozniacki (DEN)	7,270	21	September 29
2	Vera Zvonareva (RUS)	6,096	18	October 1
	Serena Williams (USA)	5,355	12(6)	Foot injury
3	Kim Clijsters (BEL)	5,295	13(10)	October 2
	Venus Williams (USA)	4,985	14(9)	Left knee injury
4	Francesca Schiavone (ITA)	4,595	21	October 6
5	Samantha Stosur (AUS)	4,572	18	October 6
6	Jelena Janković (SRB)	4,236	20	October 9
7	Elena Dementieva (RUS)	4,085	20(19)	October 9
8	Victoria Azarenka (BLR)	3,935	20	October 20

On September 29, Wozniacki was announced as the first qualifier after she won her second round match in Tokyo.

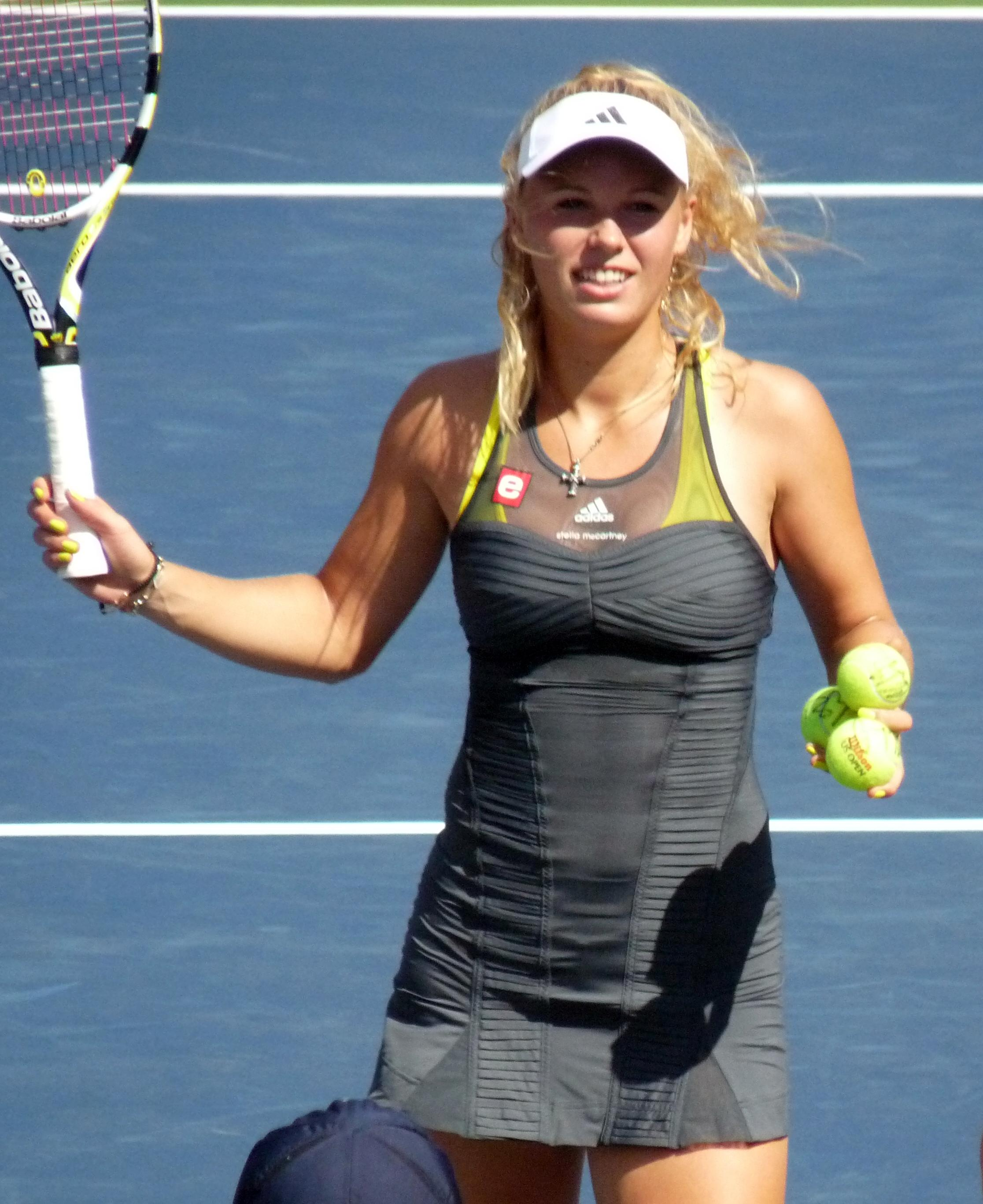
Caroline Wozniacki finished 2010 as the World No. 1

Caroline Wozniacki enjoyed her best season so far, winning six singles titles, the most on the 2010 Tour, and achieving the world no. 1 ranking after reaching the quarterfinals, and later winning, the China Open. She became the fifth player in the WTA Tour's history to not win a Grand Slam event before achieving the world no. 1 status. Wozniacki won her first title at the MPS Group Championships over Olga Govortsova, 6–2, 7–5. Her best period was after Wimbledon where she won 5 of 7 consecutive tournaments she played, beginning with the e-Boks Sony Ericsson Open where she defeated Klára Zakopalová 6–2, 7–6. After this she won back-to-back titles in Rogers Cup over Vera Zvonareva 6–3, 6–2 and defended the Pilot Pen Tennis title defeating Nadia Petrova 6–3, 3–6, 6–3. Later she again won two consecutive titles in Tokyo and the China Open defeating Elena Dementieva 1–6, 6–2, 6–3 and Vera Zvonareva 6–3, 3–6, 6–3, respectively. As well Wozniacki also reached the final of the BNP Paribas Open losing to Jelena Janković 6–2, 6–4. At the Grand Slams, Caroline reached the fourth round of the Australian Open losing to Li Na 6–4, 6–3. She reached her first French Open quarterfinal, but lost there to eventual champion Francesca Schiavone 6–2, 6–3. At Wimbledon she suffered a fourth round loss to Petra Kvitová 6–2, 6–0. In the US Open she had her first Grand Slam top seed while world no. 1 Serena Williams was injured, but lost in the semifinals 6–4, 6–3 to Vera Zvonareva. This was her second appearance at the tournament after making the semifinals in 2009.

On October 1, Zvonareva qualified after reaching the quarterfinals in Tokyo.

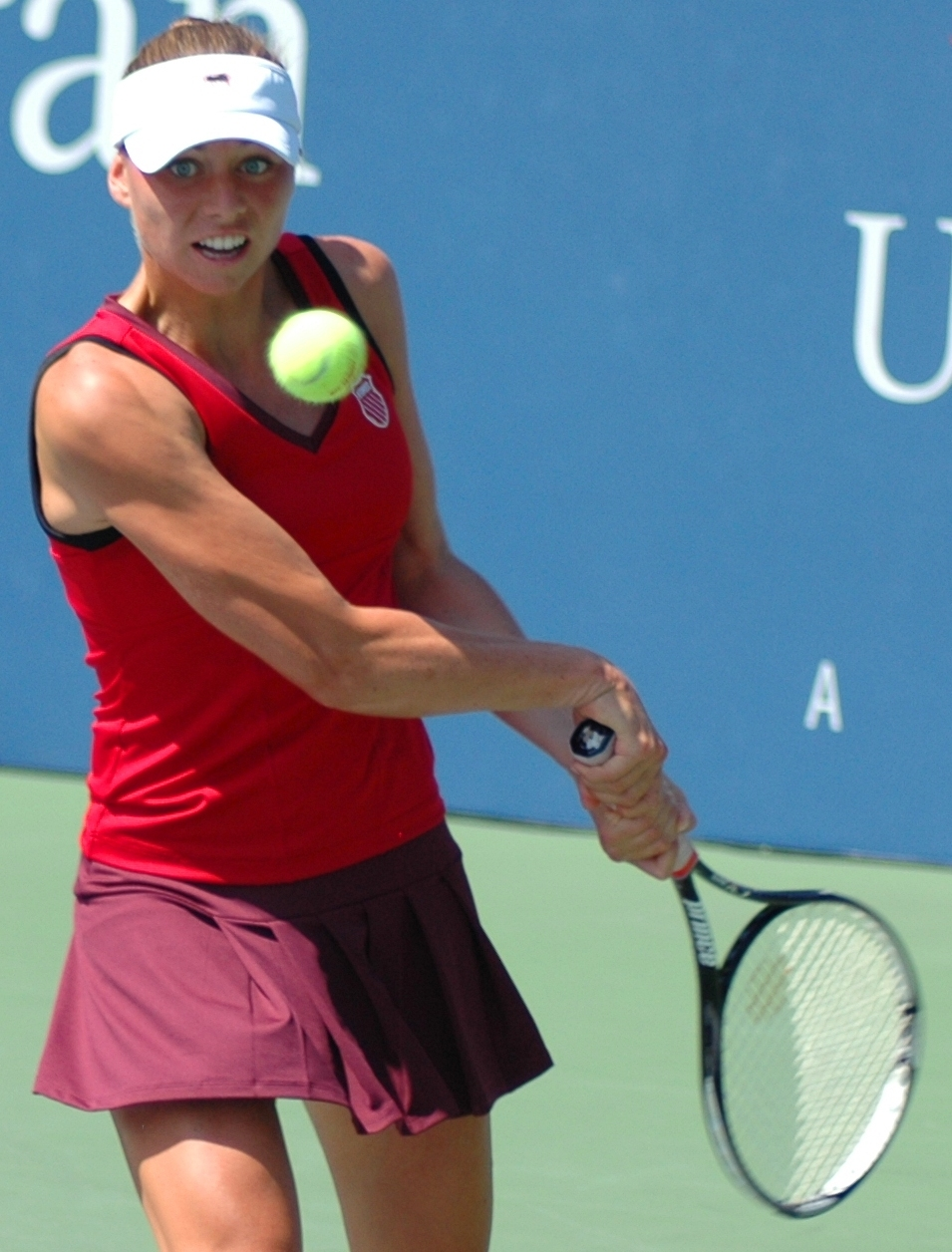
Vera Zvonareva reached two grand slam finals in 2010.

Vera Zvonareva enjoyed a successful second half of the season. She began the year by falling out of the top 20 after failing to defend her Australian Open semifinal points, when she fell to Victoria Azarenka in the fourth round and failed to defend her title at the BNP Paribas Open. She won her only title of the year in the PTT Pattaya Open in Thailand as the defending champion, defeating the local Tamarine Tanasugarn in the final 6–4, 6–4. She reached five other finals but lost in each of them. She lost to Samantha Stosur 6–0, 6–3 at the Family Circle Cup, to Wozniacki at both the Rogers Cup and the China Open 6–3, 6–2 and 6–3, 3–6, 6–3 respectively. Zvonareva's main success began when she reached her first Grand Slam final at the Wimbledon Championships after defeating Kim Clijsters for the first time in the quarterfinals, but she lost the final to defending champion Serena Williams 6–3, 6–2. She reached a consecutive Grand Slam final at the US Open after defeating top seed Caroline Wozniacki in the semifinals, but ended up losing again to the defending champion, this time Kim Clijsters. Zvonareva reached a career-high world no. 2 at the start of the Tour Championships. This was her fourth appearance there, reaching the semifinals in 2008.

On October 1, Serena Williams and Kim Clijsters were announced as qualifiers.

Serena Williams began the year by reaching the final of the Medibank International Sydney losing to Elena Dementieva 6–3, 6–2. She won 2 of the 6 events she played in the year. The first came at the Australian Open defeating rival Justine Henin 6–4, 3–6, 6–2, after beating Victoria Azarenka in the quarterfinals being a set and 4–0 down. By winning the title, she set a record of 5 Australian Open titles in the Open Era. She won her second title at the Wimbledon Championships over Vera Zvonareva 6–3, 6–2. In doing so she passed Billie Jean King as sixth in total number of Grand Slam women's singles titles. At the French Open she lost to Samantha Stosur 6–3, 6–7, 8–6 after failing to convert a match point at 5–4 in the final set. Injuries plagued her throughout the season, missing three months of action after the Australian Open due to a leg injury and another four months due to a cut/torn tendon in her right foot after Wimbledon, causing her to miss the US Open and eventually to lose the world number one status. She was the defending champion but announced that she reinjured her foot and was out for the rest of 2010.

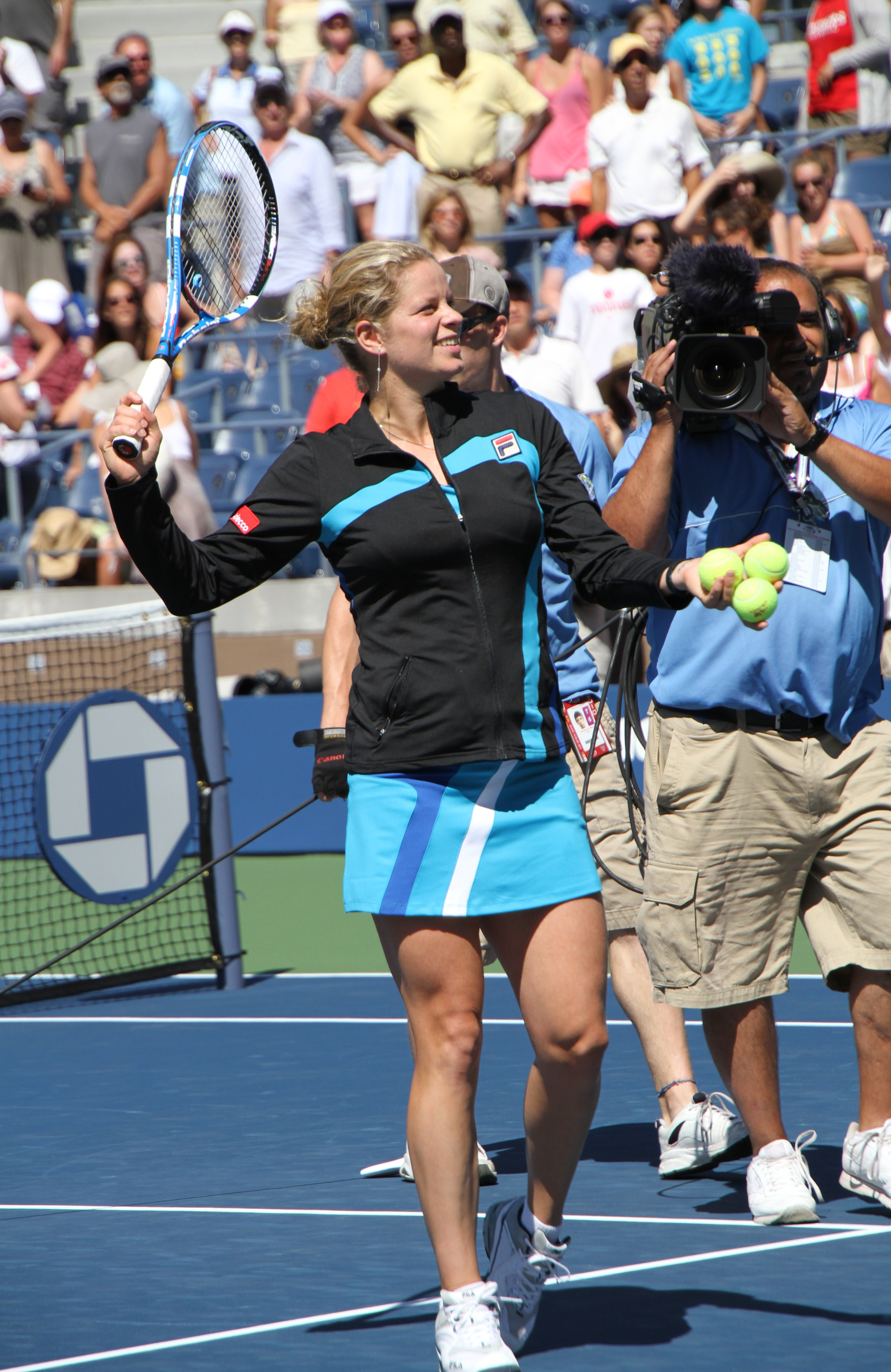
Kim Clijsters won the 2010 US Open

Kim Clijsters began the year by winning the Brisbane International against the returning Justine Henin 6–3, 4–6, 7–6. She claimed her second title of the year at the Sony Ericsson Open, defeating Venus Williams 6–2, 6–1. She missed a large amount of the clay season including the French Open due to torn muscle in her left foot, which she sustained in Belgium's Fed Cup match against Estonia. At the Western & Southern Financial Group Women's Open she defeated Maria Sharapova in the final 2–6, 7–6, 6–2 after saving match points in a rain-delayed final. In the grand slams, at the Australian Open Clijsters lost in the third round to Nadia Petrova in the worst loss of her career, losing 6–0, 6–1. At the Wimbledon Championships, Clijsters lost to Vera Zvonareva in the quarterfinals for the first time 3–6, 6–4, 6–2. The Belgian then took her winning streak at the US Open to 21 match wins after defeating Vera Zvonareva 6–2, 6–1 in the final. She competed in her 7th Year-end Championships after winning it twice in 2002 and 2003.

On October 4, Venus Williams was announced as a qualifier for the year-end championship.

Venus Williams continued to struggle in the Grand Slams outside of Wimbledon as she lost to Li Na in the quarterfinals of the Australian Open 2–6, 7–6, 7–5 despite being two points away from the win. At the French Open Williams advanced through the first three rounds but lost to Nadia Petrova 6–4, 6–3. At the Wimbledon Championships after reaching the final for the past three years, Williams suffered a loss to a then-unknown Tsvetana Pironkova 6–2, 6–3 in the quarterfinals. Outside of the grand slams Williams had more success as she won back-to-back titles in Dubai Tennis Championships and the Abierto Mexico Telcel, defeating Victoria Azarenka 6–3, 7–5 and Polona Hercog from Slovenia 2–6, 6–2, 6–3, respectively. Venus then reached the final of the Sony Ericsson Open recording a 15 match winning streak but lost to Kim Clijsters 6–2, 6–1. At the Mutua Madrileña Madrid Open Williams reached the final but lost to Frenchwoman Aravane Rezaï 6–2, 7–5. Venus missed the US Open Series due to a left knee injury but competed in the US Open where she lost to Kim Clijsters 6–4, 6–7, 4–6 in the semifinals. She then withdrew from the Year-End Championships due to the same knee injury.

On October 6, French Open finalists Francesca Schiavone and Samantha Stosur both qualified.

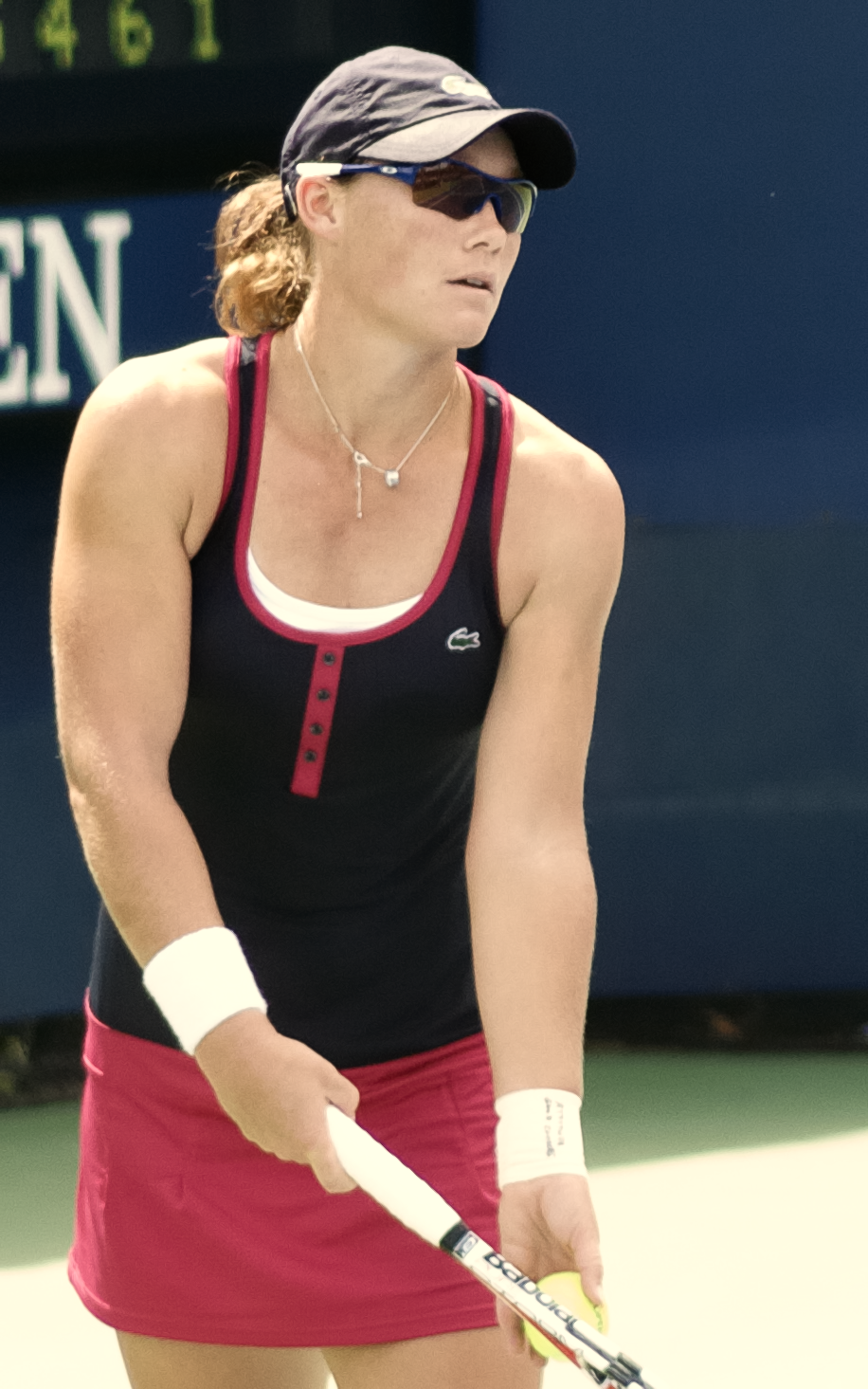
Samantha Stosur reached the 2010 French Open final.

Samantha Stosur had the best year of her career so far after deciding to concentrate solely on singles. Stosur reached her first Grand Slam singles final at the French Open. After defeating three former world number ones in Justine Henin, Serena Williams, and Jelena Janković, before being beaten by Francesca Schiavone 4–6, 6–7. In the other Slams, she lost to the eventual champion at both the Australian Open and US Open, losing to Serena Williams 6–4, 6–2 in Australia in the fourth round and to Kim Clijsters at the US Open in the quarterfinals. Her most disappointing loss came at Wimbledon, where she fell in the first round to Kaia Kanepi 4–6, 4–6, becoming the first French Open finalist to lose in the first round of Wimbledon. Despite the loss, she managed a career-high world number 5. She also reached two other finals, in the Family Circle Cup defeating Vera Zvonareva 6–0, 6–3 and in the Porsche Tennis Grand Prix, losing to Justine Henin 6–4, 2–6, 6–1. This was Stosur's debut in the singles of the Year-End Championships after twice winning in doubles.

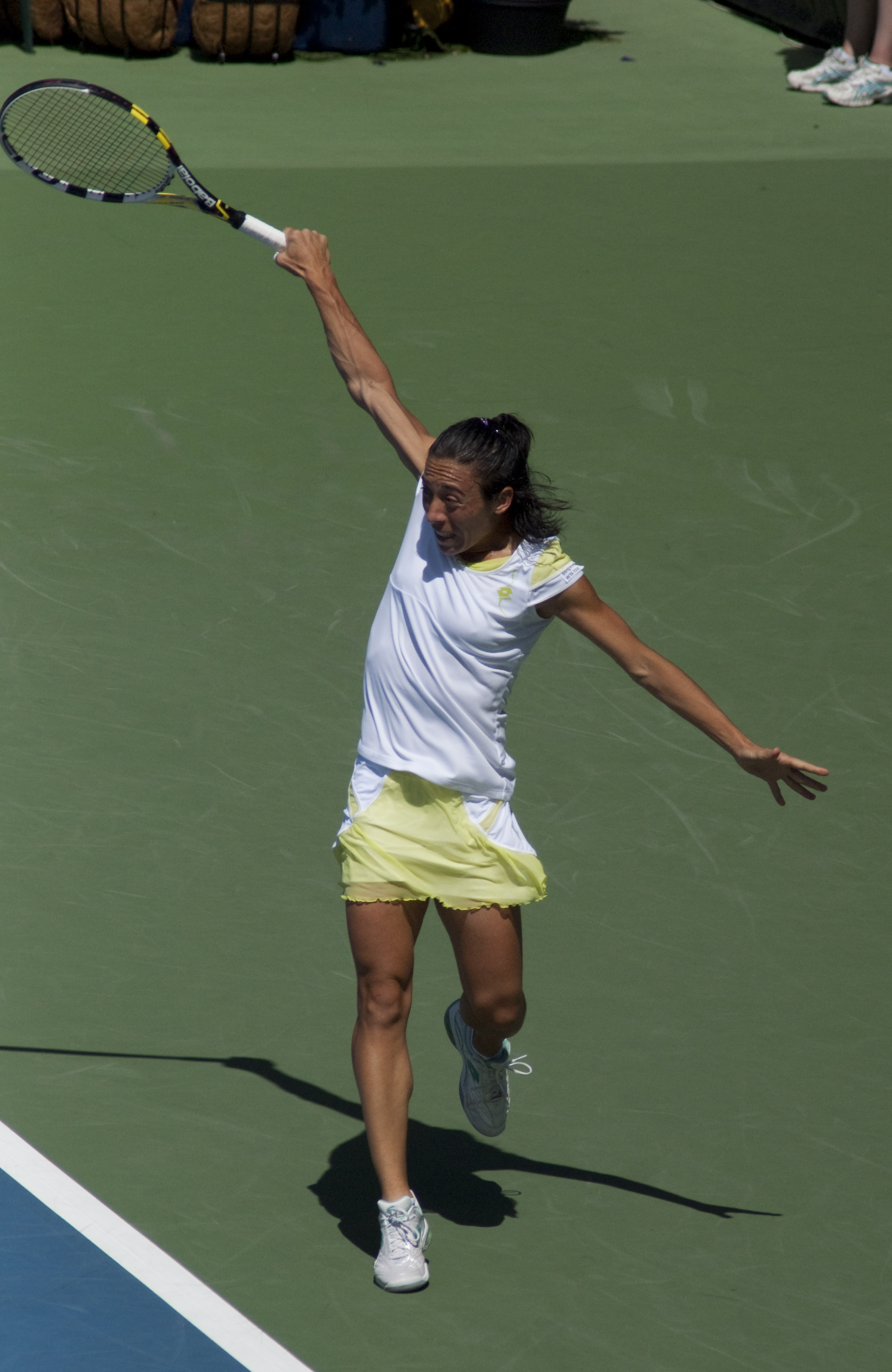
Francesca Schiavone won the 2010 French Open.

Francesca Schiavone won her first Grand Slam title at the 2010 French Open beating Samantha Stosur 6–4, 7–6. This was the first time that Schiavone had gone past the quarterfinals. It also made her the first Italian to win a Grand Slam and the highest ranked Italian when she reached the height of world number 6. However, along with co-finalist Samantha Stosur she also fell in the first round of Wimbledon to Vera Dushevina 7–6, 5–7, 1–6. She won one other title at the 2010 Barcelona Ladies Open defeating compatriot Roberta Vinci 6–1, 6–1. She also reached the fourth round of the Australian Open and the quarterfinals of the US Open losing in both to Venus Williams 3–6, 6–2, 6–1 and 7–6, 6–4, respectively. Schiavone made her first appearance in the Year-End Championships.

On October 9, due to Venus Williams' withdrawal, both Elena Dementieva and Jelena Janković secured a spot in the Year-End Championships.

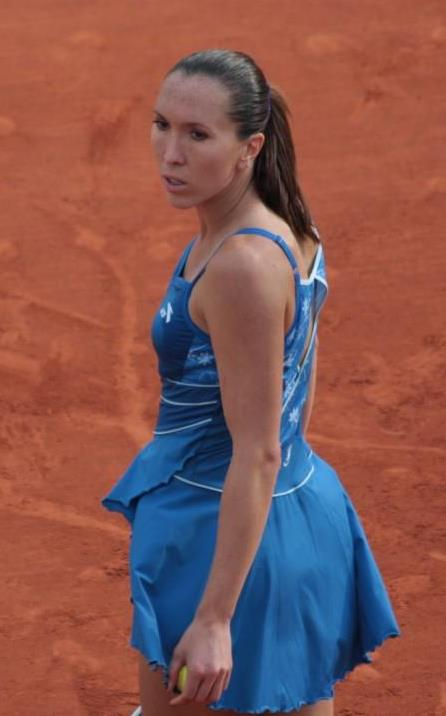
Jelena Janković won the 2010 BNP Paribas Open.

Jelena Janković continued to find the form that brought her to the number 1 ranking in 2008. She reached two finals in 2010, on the hard courts of the BNP Paribas Open where she defeated Caroline Wozniacki 6–2, 6–4 and on the clay courts of the Internazionali BNL d'Italia where she defeated both Venus Williams and Serena Williams in the quarterfinals and semifinals, respectively, before falling to María José Martínez Sánchez 6–7, 5–7. In the slams, Janković reached her first Grand Slam semifinal since reaching the final of the 2008 US Open at the French Open, losing to Samantha Stosur 6–1, 6–2. She also reached the third rounds of the Australian Open and the US Open losing to Alona Bondarenko 6–2, 6–3 and Kaia Kanepi 6–2, 7–6 respectively. At the Wimbledon Championships she was able to reach the fourth round before retiring to eventual finalist Vera Zvonareva while trailing 6–1, 3–0. She made her fourth consecutive appearance at the Tour Championships after reaching the semifinals in her previous two trips.

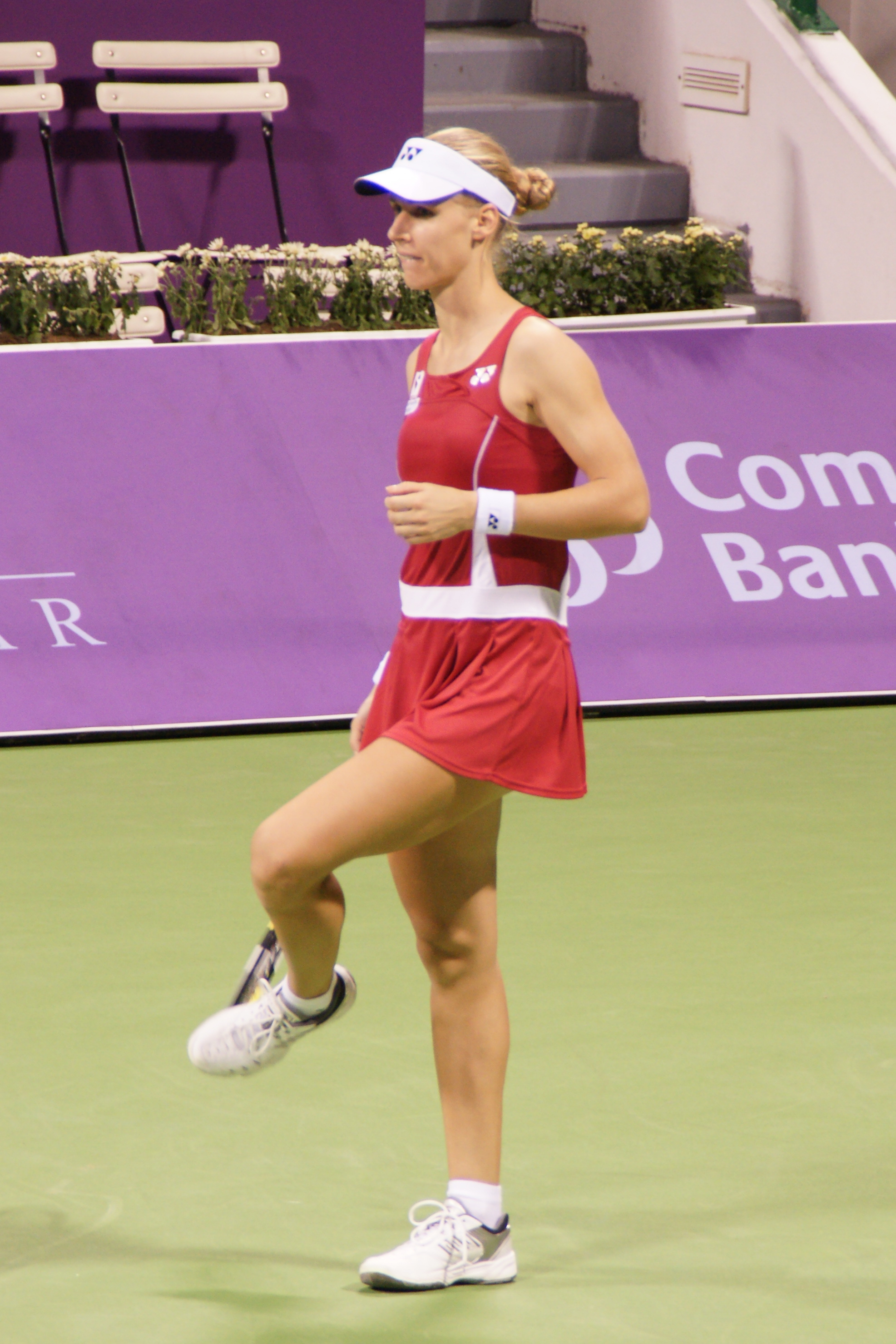
Elena Dementieva announced her retirement at the 2010 WTA Tour Championships.

Elena Dementieva had a lopsided season for 2010 as she fell outside of the top ten for the first time since 2008. However, she was able to reach four finals in the year, winning two of them. Her first title came at the Medibank International Sydney where she defeated world number one, Serena Williams, in the final 6–3, 6–2. The second title came at the Open GDF Suez defeating Czech player Lucie Šafářová 6–7, 6–1, 6–4. She finished runner-up to compatriot Alisa Kleybanova at the Malaysian Open and to Caroline Wozniacki at the Toray Pan Pacific Open. In the Grand Slams, Elena drew an unseeded Justine Henin and lost to the eventual finalist, 5–7, 6–7 in the second round of the Australian Open. At the French Open Dementieva had to retire against Francesca Schiavone after the first set tie-break during their semifinal match. The injury also caused her to miss Wimbledon, ending her 46 consecutive main draw appearances at the Grand Slams. At the US Open she was able to reach the fourth round before losing to Samantha Stosur. This was her 10th appearance and she reached the semifinals twice in 2000 and 2008. She announced her retirement from tennis during the tournament.

On October 20, Victoria Azarenka replaced Serena Williams to book the final spot in the year-end championships

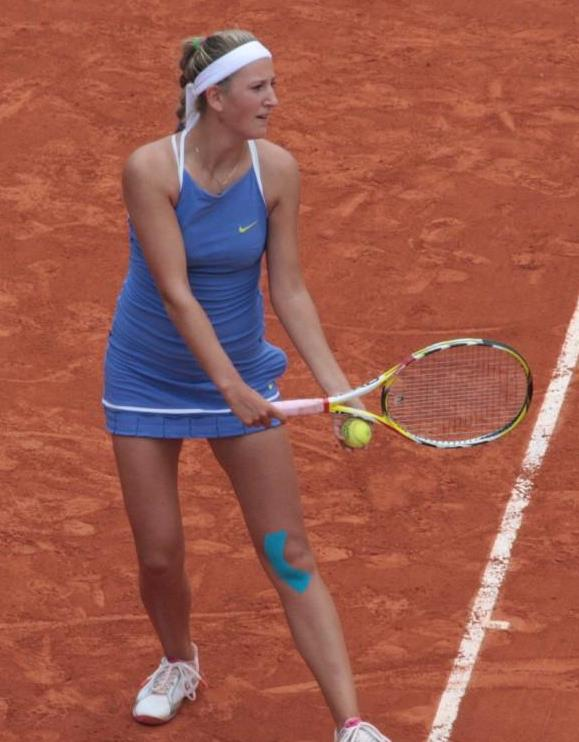
Victoria Azarenka won two singles titles in 2010.

Victoria Azarenka showed good form in the beginning of the year by reaching the semifinals, quarterfinals, and final of Sydney, the Australian Open, and Dubai, respectively. After an injury Azarenka showed signs of a return to form at the Aegon International, where she was the runner up losing in the final to Ekaterina Makarova 7–6, 6–4. Despite the strong showing at the event, she suffered another upset in the third round of Wimbledon. Her good form from Eastbourne followed into the American hard-court season, winning the Bank of the West Classic by beating top seeded Samantha Stosur 6–2, 6–3 in the semifinals and Maria Sharapova 6–4, 6–1 in the final. Another semifinal showing at the Rogers Cup allowed Azarenka to finish in a three-way tie for third at the US Open Series. Despite her good form, a concussion forced Azarenka to retire in the second round of the US Open, after she fell over and hit her head during the warm up. A semifinal showing in Tokyo and reaching the quarterfinals in Moscow allowed Azarenka to take the eighth and final spot. Azarenka went on to claim the Moscow crown. This was her second consecutive appearance at the Tour Championships after she failed to advance from her group in 2009.

The first alternate for the Tour Championships was Li Na who produced her best season so far. She became the highest ranked Chinese player ever, reaching a career high of world no. 9 in August 2010. She reached the semifinals of the Australian Open, losing to Serena Williams 7–6, 7–6. She also reached the quarterfinals of Wimbledon for the second time, but ended up losing to Serena Williams 7–5, 6–3. Li also won the Aegon Classic beating Maria Sharapova 7–5, 6–1 in the final. This was her first title in a year and a half and her third career title. The second alternate was Shahar Pe'er who reached one final in the year, at the Moorilla Hobart International losing to Alona Bondarenko 6–2, 6–4. She was also able to reach the semifinals of the ASB Classic, Barclays Dubai Tennis Championships, Porsche Tennis Grand Prix, Mutua Madrileña Madrid Open, China Open and HP Open. Both alternates made their first trip to the year-end championships but neither of them got to play. Both 2009 alternates had played that year but there were no serious injuries among the starting players in 2010.

=== Doubles ===
Race doubles (as of October 25, 2010)
Rk	Name	Points	Tour	Date Qualified
1	Gisela Dulko (ARG); Flavia Pennetta (ITA)	8,581	16	September 14
2	Květa Peschke (CZE); Katarina Srebotnik (SLO)	6,596	17	September 29
	Serena Williams (USA); Venus Williams (USA)	5,500	4	Serena: foot injury Venus: left knee injury
3	Lisa Raymond (USA); Rennae Stubbs (AUS)	5,104	18	October 7
4	Vania King (USA); Yaroslava Shvedova (KAZ)	4,978	10	October 7

On September 14, Gisela Dulko and Flavia Pennetta qualified for the first time for the year-end championships.

Gisela Dulko and Flavia Pennetta was the standout team of the year, winning 5 titles. This was the most any team managed to accumulate in 2010. Their first title came in the Sony Ericsson Open triumphing over Petrova and Stosur. Then the pair claimed back-to-back titles in the European clay season at the Porsche Tennis Grand Prix and Internazionali BNL d'Italia over the teams of Peschke & Srebotnik and reigning Tour Champions Llagostera Vives & Martínez Sánchez 6–4, 6–2. They also won the Swedish Open defeating Voráčová & Záhlavová-Strýcová and the Rogers Cup defeating Peschke & Srebotnik. They were the runners up in two other finals, first at the Mutua Madrileña Madrid Open losing to Venus Williams & Serena Williams and secondly at the China Open losing to Chuang & Govortsova. Dulko also won another doubles title in the Copa BBVA-Colsanitas whilst partnering Edina Gallovits. In the Grand Slams, they were able to reach the semifinals of the Wimbledon Championships and the quarterfinals of the Australian Open, French Open, and US Open.

On September 29, Květa Peschke and Katarina Srebotnik qualified for the event.

Květa Peschke and Katarina Srebotnik won two titles in the year both coming in the United States. The first title was at the BNP Paribas Open beating Stosur and Petrova in the final. The second title came at the Pilot Pen Tennis after beating the American team of Mattek-Sands & Shaughnessy. They also finished runner-up in four events, at the Barcleys Dubai Tennis Championships, the Aegon International, the Rogers Cup to Dulko & Pennetta and finally the Generali Ladies Linz losing to Czechs Voráčová & Záhlavová-Strýcová. Peschke won another title with Chuang in the Moorilla Hobart International. In the Grand Slams, they were able to reach the final of the French Open losing to Venus and Serena Williams 6–2, 6–3, the quarterfinals of the Wimbledon Championships and the third round of the US Open.

On October 7, as the Williams Sisters withdrew, the teams of Lisa Raymond & Rennae Stubbs and Vania King & Yaroslava Shvedova qualified.

Serena Williams and Venus Williams completed a non-calendar year Grand Slam. They won the Australian Open defeating top seeds Black and Huber in the final, and then the French Open, defeating Peschke and Srebotnik in the final. They won another title in the Mutua Madrileña Madrid Open over Dulko and Pennetta 6–2, 7–5. Their Grand Slam winning streak ended at 27 when they lost to Vesnina & Zvonareva in the quarterfinals of the Wimbledon Championships. They also became the World no. 1 in doubles for the first time when they won the French Open. The pair picked up injuries after Wimbledon and didn't play for the rest of the season, except for a singles appearance by Venus at the US Open. Venus called an end to her season with a left knee injury eliminating the pair whilst a few weeks later Serena also called an end to her season as a torn ligament in her foot continued to cause problems.

Lisa Raymond and Rennae Stubbs reunited again and won one title together at the Aegon International beating Peschke and Srebotnik. Raymond won another title in the Aegon Classic with Cara Black defeating the American team of Huber and Shaughnessy after the Americans retired. As a team they reached two other finals at the Mercury Insurance Open and the Western & Southern Financial Group Women's Open. On both occasions they lost to Kirilenko, teaming up with Zheng and Azarenka, respectively. They were able to reach the semifinals of the Australian Open, the quarterfinals of Wimbledon and US Open and the third round of the French Open.

Vania King and Yaroslava Shvedova began their partnership during the grass season. They had immediate success as they won Wimbledon beating Vesnina and Zvonareva and the US Open defeating Petrova and Huber, to claim their first grand slam titles. During the grass season King and Shvedova also finished runner-up to Kudryavtseva & Rodionova at the UNICEF Open. King also won two other titles with different partners, at the Cellular South Cup with Krajicek defeating Mattek-Sands and Shaughnessy and the Internationaux de Strasbourg with Cornet winning against Kudryavtseva & Rodionova. Additionally King reached two other finals in the Monterrey Open with Grönefeld losing to Benešová & Záhlavová-Strýcová and the Family Circle Cup with Krajicek losing to Huber & Petrova.

== Groupings ==
The 2010 edition of the year-end championships featured three former World number ones, two Grand Slam champions, seven Grand Slam finalists. Two of them made their debut at the championships. As in the 2009 tournament, the competitors were divided into two groups representing the colors of the flag of Qatar. The Maroon group consisted of no. 1 seed Caroline Wozniacki, no. 4 seed Francesca Schiavone, no. 5 seed Samantha Stosur and no. 7 seed Elena Dementieva. The White Group was composed of no. 2 seed Vera Zvonareva, no, 3 seed Kim Clijsters, no. 6 seed Jelena Janković and no. 8 seed Victoria Azarenka. Li Na and Shahar Pe'er served as alternates but did not get to play.

In the White Group, all players had reached grand slam finals in their career, with Francesca Schiavone having won the 2010 French Open, beating Samantha Stosur in the final. In their head-to-heads with players within their group, Caroline Wozniacki was 7–7, Francesca Schiavone was 9–12, Samantha Stosur was 8–8 and Elena Dementieva was 14–11. Wozniacki leading the group, had a mixed record against opponents within her group. She had a winning record against Dementieva, leading the Russian 4–3, and winning both their encounters in 2010 - in the semifinals of Pilot Pen Tennis 1–6, 6–3, 7–6 and in the finals of the Toray Pan Pacific Open 1–6, 6–2, 6–3. Against Stosur, she had a 2–2 record, with their last match won by Stosur in the 2009 HP Open 6–0, 4–6, 6–4. However, against Schiavone, the top seed had a losing record of 1–2, with her only win coming in the 2010 Rogers Cup 6–3, 6–2, with Schiavone winning their other 2010 encounter, in the clay at the French Open 6–2, 6–3. Dementieva, on the other hand had a winning record against both Stosur and Schiavone. She was 4–2 against Stosur, winning their first three 2010 encounters, with Stosur winning their last encounter at the US Open in a tight match 6–3, 2–6, 7–6. Dementieva was 7–5 against Schiavone, with Dementieva winning 2 of their 3 encounters in 2010 - in the Toray Pan Pacific Open and Medibank International Sydney, and Schiavone winning their match in the French Open semifinals, when Dementieva retired after losing the first set. In the match-up between French Open finalists Stosur and Schiavone, Stosur leads 4–2 with Schiavone winning their last match at the finals of the 2010 French Open 6–4, 7–6. Stosur won the previous four matches before the French Open final.

The Maroon Group featured players with more experience in the championships, as all of them had competed before. In their respective records, the 2010 Wimbledon and US Open finalist Vera Zvonareva was 13–14, Kim Clijsters was 14–5, Jelena Janković was 10–14 and Victoria Azarenka was 5–10. Like Wozniacki, the leader of the Maroon group Zvonareva also had a mixed record within her group. Zvonerava had a winning record against Azarenka, 5–2. They met three times before in 2010, with Zvonerava winning their last encounter in the Rogers Cup, 7–6, 1–0 ret, while Azarenka's two wins came earlier in the year, at the Australian Open, 4–6, 6–4, 6–0 and Barclays Dubai Tennis Championships 6–1, 6–3. Against Janković, Zvonareva had an even record of 6–6, with Vera winning their last three encounters, including the Dubai Tennis Championships 6–3, 6–2 and Wimbledon 6–1, 3–0 ret. However, against Clijsters she had a losing record of 2–6. Zvonareva ended a streak of five straight Clijsters wins when she won at Wimbledon 3–6, 6–3, 6–2 and the Rogers Cup 2–6, 6–3, 6–2, but Clijsters won their last encounter in the US Open final 6–2, 6–1. Clijsters was the only one in the tournament that had a winning record against all in her group. She was 6–1 against Janković, with Janković's only win being their last match at the 2009 Rogers Cup 1–6, 6–3, 7–5. Against Azarenka, she was 2–1 splitting their 2010 meetings, with Clijsters winning the Sony Ericsson Open 6–4, 6–0 and Azarenka winning the Aegon International 7–6, 6–4. Azarenka had a losing record against all players in her group. She was 2–3 against Janković, however Azarenka won their last encounter at the WTA Tour Championships 6–2, 6–3 in 2009.

The four doubles teams started the semifinals without group play.

== Player head-to-heads ==
Below are the head-to-head records as they approached the tournament.

		Wozniacki	Zvonareva	Clijsters	Schiavone	Stosur	Janković	Dementieva	Azarenka	Overall
1	(Denmark) Caroline Wozniacki		3–3	0–1	1–2	2–2	0–4	4–3	3–2	13–17
2	(Russia) Vera Zvonareva	3–3		2–6	10–0	2–5	6–6	2–5	5–2	30–27
3	(Belgium) Kim Clijsters	1–0	6–2		11–0	3–0	6–1	11–3	2–1	40–7
4	(Italy) Francesca Schiavone	2–1	0–10	0–11		2–4	1–3	5–7	1–2	11–38
5	(Australia) Samantha Stosur	2–2	5–2	0–3	4–2		2–3	2–4	0–4	15–20
6	(Serbia) Jelena Janković	4–0	6–6	1–6	3–1	3–2		7–3	3–2	27–20
7	(Russia) Elena Dementieva	3–4	5–2	3–11	7–5	4–2	3–7		3–1	28–32
8	(Belarus) Victoria Azarenka	2–3	2–5	1–2	2–1	4–0	2–3	1–3		14–17

== Prize money and points ==
The total prize money for the 2010 Sony Ericsson Championships was 4.5 million United States dollars.

Stage	Singles	Doubles^{1}	Points ^{3}
Champion	+$770,000	$375,000	+450
Runner-up	+$380,000	$187,500	+360
Round robin (3 wins)	$400,000	$93,750^{2}	690
Round robin (2 wins)	$300,000	–	530
Round robin (1 win)	$200,000	–	370
Round robin (0 wins)	$100,000	–	210
Alternates	$50,000	–	

- ^{1} Prize money for doubles is per team.
- ^{2} Prize money is for doubles semifinalists
- ^{3} for every match played in the round robin a player gets 70 points automatically, and for each round robin win they get 160 additional points

== Day-by-day summaries ==
All matches were played at the Khalifa International Tennis and Squash Complex.

=== Day 1 ===
Group	Winner	Loser	Score
White	(Russia) Vera Zvonareva [2]	(Serbia) Jelena Janković [6]	6–3, 6–0
Maroon	(Denmark) Caroline Wozniacki [1]	(Russia) Elena Dementieva [7]	6–1, 6–1
Maroon	(Australia) Samantha Stosur [5]	(Italy) Francesca Schiavone [4]	6–4, 6–4
1st match started at 5:00 PM

=== Day 2 ===
Group	Winner	Loser	Score
White	(Russia) Vera Zvonareva [2]	(Belarus) Victoria Azarenka [8]	7–6^{(7–4)}, 6–4
White	(Belgium) Kim Clijsters [3]	(Serbia) Jelena Janković [6]	6–2, 6–3
Maroon	(Australia) Samantha Stosur [5]	(Denmark) Caroline Wozniacki [1]	6–4, 6–3
1st match started at 5:00 PM

=== Day 3 ===
Group	Winner	Loser	Score
Maroon	(Russia) Elena Dementieva [7]	(Australia) Samantha Stosur [5]	4–6, 6–4, 7–6^{(7–4)}
Maroon	(Denmark) Caroline Wozniacki [1]	(Italy) Francesca Schiavone [4]	3–6, 6–1, 6–1
White	(Belgium) Kim Clijsters [3]	(Belarus) Victoria Azarenka [8]	6–4, 5–7, 6–1
1st match started at 5:00 PM

=== Day 4 ===
Group	Winner	Loser	Score
Maroon	(Italy) Francesca Schiavone [4]	(Russia) Elena Dementieva [7]	6–4, 6–2
White	(Russia) Vera Zvonareva [2]	(Belgium) Kim Clijsters [3]	6–4, 7–5
White	(Belarus) Victoria Azarenka [8]	(Serbia) Jelena Janković [6]	6–4, 6–1
1st match started at 5:00 PM

=== Day 5 ===
Group	Winner	Loser	Score
Doubles - Semifinals	(Czech Republic) Květa Peschke [2] (Slovenia) Katarina Srebotnik [2]	(United States) Lisa Raymond [3] (Australia) Rennae Stubbs [3]	7–6^{(8–6)}, 6–3
Singles - Semifinals ^{1}	(Belgium) Kim Clijsters [3]	(Australia) Samantha Stosur [5]	7–6^{(7–3)}, 6–1
Singles - Semifinals	(Denmark) Caroline Wozniacki [1]	(Russia) Vera Zvonareva [2]	7–5, 6–0
Doubles - Semifinals ^{2}	(Argentina) Gisela Dulko [1] (Italy) Flavia Pennetta [1]	(United States) Vania King [4] (Kazakhstan) Yaroslava Shvedova [4]	6–4, 6–4
1st match started at 3:00 PM^{1} Not before 5:30 PM^{2} Not before 8:30 PM

=== Day 6 ===
Group	Champion	Runner up	Score
Singles - Final	(Belgium) Kim Clijsters [3]	(Denmark) Caroline Wozniacki [1]	6–3, 5–7, 6–3
Doubles - Final ^{1}	(Argentina) Gisela Dulko [1] (Italy) Flavia Pennetta [1]	(Czech Republic) Květa Peschke [2] (Slovenia) Katarina Srebotnik [2]	7–5, 6–4
1st match started at 6:00 PM^{1} Not before 8:00 PM

== Race to the championships ==
=== Singles ===
Those with a gold background have enough points to qualify; with a brown background withdrew.

Rank	Athlete	Grand Slam tournament				Premier Mandatory				Best Premier 5		Best other						Total points	Tourn
Rank	Athlete	AUS	FRA	WIM	USO	IW	MIA	MAD	BEI	1	2	1	2	3	4	5	6	Total points	Tourn
1	(Denmark) Caroline Wozniacki	R16; 280	QF; 500	R16; 280	SF; 900	F 700	QF; 250	R32; 80	W 1000	W 900	W 900	W 470	W 280	W 280	SF; 200	QF; 120	R16; 125	7,270	21
2	(Russia) Vera Zvonareva	R16; 280	R64; 100	F 1400	F 1400	R16; 140	R16; 140	R32; 80	F 700	F 620	QF; 225	F 320	W 280	QF; 225	R16; 125	R16; 60	R32; 1	6,096	18
3	(United States) Serena Williams	W 2000	QF; 500	W 2000	A 0	A 0	A 0	R16; 140	A 0	SF; 395		F 320						5,355	6
4	(Belgium) Kim Clijsters	R32; 160	A 0	QF; 500	W 2000	R32; 80	W 1000	A 0	A 0	W 900	QF; 225	W 280	QF; 120	R16; 30				5,295	13
5	(United States) Venus Williams	QF; 500	R16; 240	QF; 500	SF; 900	A 0	F 700	F 700	A 0	W 900	QF; 225	W 280						4,985	9
6	(Italy) Francesca Schiavone	R16; 280	W 2000	R128; 5	QF; 500	R32; 80	R32; 80	R16; 140	QF; 250	SF; 395	QF; 225	W 280	SF; 130	R32; 70	R32; 70	R16; 60	R32; 1	4,595	21
7	(Australia) Samantha Stosur	R16; 280	F 1400	R128; 5	QF; 500	SF; 450	QF; 250	QF; 250	R64; 5	R64; 1	R32; 1	W 470	F 320	SF; 200	SF; 200	QF; 120	QF; 120	4,572	17
8	(Serbia) Jelena Janković	R32; 160	SF; 900	R16; 240	R32; 160	W 1000	R16; 140	QF; 250	R32; 80	F 620	R16; 125	R16; 125	R16; 125	QF; 120	QF; 120	R16; 30	R32; 1	4,236	20
9	(Russia) Elena Dementieva	R64; 100	SF; 900	A 0	R16; 280	QF; 250	R64; 5	R32; 80	R16; 140	F 625	R16; 125	W 470	W 470	F 200	SF; 200	R16; 125	QF; 120	4,085	20
10	(Belarus) Victoria Azarenka	QF; 500	R128; 5	R32; 160	R64; 100	R32; 80	R16; 140	R64; 5	R32; 5	F 620	SF; 395	W 470	W 470	SF; 395	F 320	SF; 200	QF; 60	3,935	20
11	(China) Li Na	SF; 900	R32; 160	QF; 500	R128; 5	R64; 5	R64; 5	QF; 250	SF; 450	QF; 225	R16; 125	W 280	SF; 200	SF; 130	R16; 125	QF; 120	R16; 30	3,540	20
12	(Belgium) Justine Henin	F 1400	R16; 240	R16; 240	A 0	R64; 50	SF; 450	R64; 5	A 0			W 470	W 280	F 200				3,415	11
13	(Israel) Shahar Pe'er	R32; 160	R16; 280	R64; 100	R16; 240	R16; 140	R32; 80	SF; 450	SF; 450	SF; 395	R16; 125	F 200	SF; 200	SF; 130	SF; 130	QF; 120	QF; 120	3,365	21
