= 2010 WTA Tour Championships – Doubles =

Doubles
- 2010 WTA Tour Championships

Final
- Champions: (Argentina) Gisela Dulko (Italy) Flavia Pennetta
- Runners-up: (Czech Republic) Květa Peschke (Slovenia) Katarina Srebotnik
- Score: 7–5, 6–4

Details
- Draw: 4
- Seeds: 4

Events
Singles	Doubles
← 2009 ·	WTA Tour Championships	· 2011 →

Gisela Dulko and Flavia Pennetta defeated Květa Peschke and Katarina Srebotnik in the final, 7–5, 6–4 to win the doubles tennis title at the 2010 WTA Tour Championships.

Nuria Llagostera Vives and María José Martínez Sánchez were the reigning champions, but did not qualify this year.

== Seeds ==
1. (Argentina) Gisela Dulko / (Italy) Flavia Pennetta (champions)
2. (Czech Republic) Květa Peschke / (Slovenia) Katarina Srebotnik (final)
3. (United States) Lisa Raymond / (Australia) Rennae Stubbs (semifinals)
4. (United States) Vania King / (Kazakhstan) Yaroslava Shvedova (semifinals)

Notes :

- (United States) Serena Williams / (United States) Venus Williams had qualified but withdrew due to injury.

== Draw ==
=== Key ===
- Q = Qualifier
- WC = Wild card
- LL = Lucky loser
- Alt = Alternate
- SE = Special exempt
- PR = Protected ranking
- ITF = ITF entry
- JE = Junior exempt
- w/o = Walkover
- r = Retired
- d = Defaulted
- SR = Special ranking

=== Finals ===
Semifinals
1	(Argentina) Gisela Dulko (Italy) Flavia Pennetta	6	6
4	(United States) Vania King (Kazakhstan) Yaroslava Shvedova	4	4
3	(United States) Lisa Raymond (Australia) Rennae Stubbs	6^{6}	3
2	(Czech Republic) Květa Peschke (Slovenia) Katarina Srebotnik	7^{8}	6

Final
1	(Argentina) Gisela Dulko (Italy) Flavia Pennetta	7	6
2	(Czech Republic) Květa Peschke (Slovenia) Katarina Srebotnik	5	4
