= Gisela Dulko =

Argentine tennis player

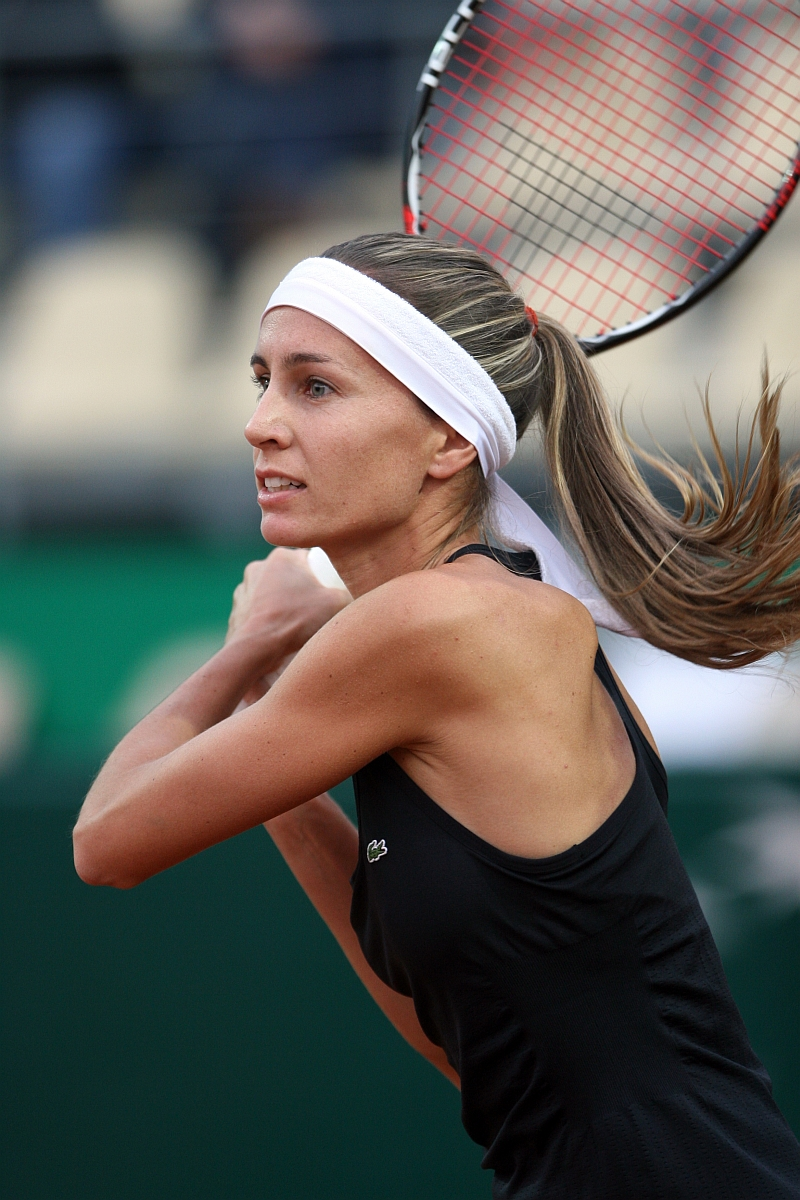
- Dulko at the 2009 Italian Open
- Country (sports): Argentina
- Residence: Buenos Aires, Argentina
- Born: 30 January 1985 (age 41) Tigre, Argentina
- Height: 1.70 m (5 ft 7 in)
- Turned pro: January 2001
- Retired: 18 November 2012
- Plays: Right–handed (two–handed backhand)
- Prize money: $4,246,105

Singles
- Career record: 309–242
- Career titles: 4
- Highest ranking: No. 26 (21 November 2005)

Grand Slam singles results
- Australian Open: 3R (2010)
- French Open: 4R (2006, 2011)
- Wimbledon: 3R (2004, 2006, 2008, 2009)
- US Open: 4R (2009)

Doubles
- Career record: 305–182
- Career titles: 17
- Highest ranking: No. 1 (1 November 2010)

Grand Slam doubles results
- Australian Open: W (2011)
- French Open: QF (2007, 2010)
- Wimbledon: SF (2010)
- US Open: QF (2010)

Other doubles tournaments
- Tour Finals: W (2010)

Team competitions
- Hopman Cup: F (2005)

Gisela Dulko (Spanish pronunciation: [xiˈsela ˈðulko]; born 30 January 1985) is an Argentine former tennis player. Although she enjoyed modest success in singles, reaching a career-high ranking of world No. 26 and winning four WTA titles, her speciality was doubles, where she achieved the world No. 1 ranking and won 17 WTA titles. Partnering with Flavia Pennetta, Dulko won the 2010 WTA Tour Championships and the 2011 Australian Open. She also reached the mixed-doubles final at the 2011 US Open, with Eduardo Schwank. During her career, Dulko upset a number of top players on the tour, including Maria Sharapova in the second round of Wimbledon in 2009, Samantha Stosur in the third round of Roland Garros in 2011, and Martina Navratilova in the second round of Wimbledon in 2004 and in Navratilova's final Grand Slam singles match.

Dulko retired from professional tennis on 18 November 2012, aged 27.

== Early life ==
Gisela was born and raised in Tigre, Buenos Aires Province. Her brother Alejandro, who is seven years her senior, was her coach. Gisela was born to Ana and now deceased Estanislao Dulko, who was of Hungarian descent. At the age of twelve, she moved from Argentina to Miami, Florida, to pursue a professional tennis career.

== Career ==
=== 1999–2008 ===
As a junior, she won three Grand Slam events in doubles: the 2000 US Open with María Emilia Salerni, the 2002 Australian Open with Angelique Widjaja, and the 2001 Wimbledon Championships with Ashley Harkleroad.

On 29 April 2007, she won her first WTA title by defeating Sorana Cîrstea of Romania in the final of the Tier-III event in Budapest. On 25 August 2007, Dulko won her second WTA title at the Forest Hills Tier-IV event, defeating Virginie Razzano. On 4 May 2008, she won her third WTA title at the Grand Prix SAR La Princesse Lalla Meryem Tier-IV event, defeating Anabel Medina Garrigues.

=== 2009 ===
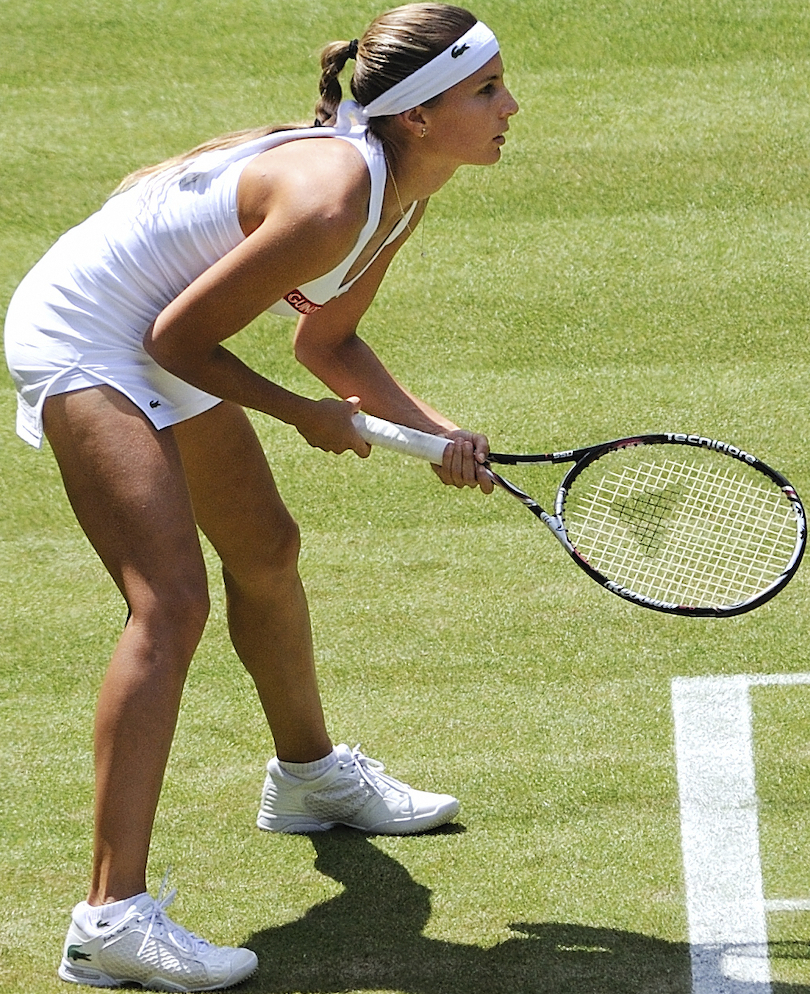
Dulko at the 2009 Wimbledon Championships

In January, she played at the Hong Kong Tennis Classic with two Americans, CoCo Vandeweghe and Venus Williams, and then started the year with a quarter-final appearance at the Hobart International, losing to Iveta Benešová. At the Australian Open she lost to the eventual champion, Serena Williams, in the second round. In the first round of the Fed Cup, she gave her team their only wins when she defeated Americans Melanie Oudin and Jill Craybas. In the Copa Sony Ericsson Colsanitas she reached her first final of the year, but lost to María José Martínez Sánchez. She then reached the quarter-finals of the Monterrey Open and the Porsche Tennis Grand Prix, and the third round of mandatory events in Indian Wells and Miami. However, she lost in the second rounds of the Internazionali BNL d'Italia and Internationaux de Strasbourg and made first round exits at the Madrid Open and the Aegon International.

She reached the third round in the next two Grand Slams, losing to Dominika Cibulková at the French Open, and then to Nadia Petrova at Wimbledon after she had upset the 24th seed, Maria Sharapova, in three sets in the second round.

At the Swedish Open, she lost again to Martínez Sánchez, this time in the semi-finals. She then made first-round exits in the Internazionali Femminili di Palermo, the LA Women's Tennis Championships and the Pilot Pen Tennis, and failed to qualify for the Rogers Cup. At the US Open, she made it to the round of 16 before falling to Kateryna Bondarenko 0–6, 0–6 in just 47 minutes. Her last tournament of the year was at the Toray Pan Pacific Open, where she reached the second round before losing to Benešová in three sets.

=== 2010 ===
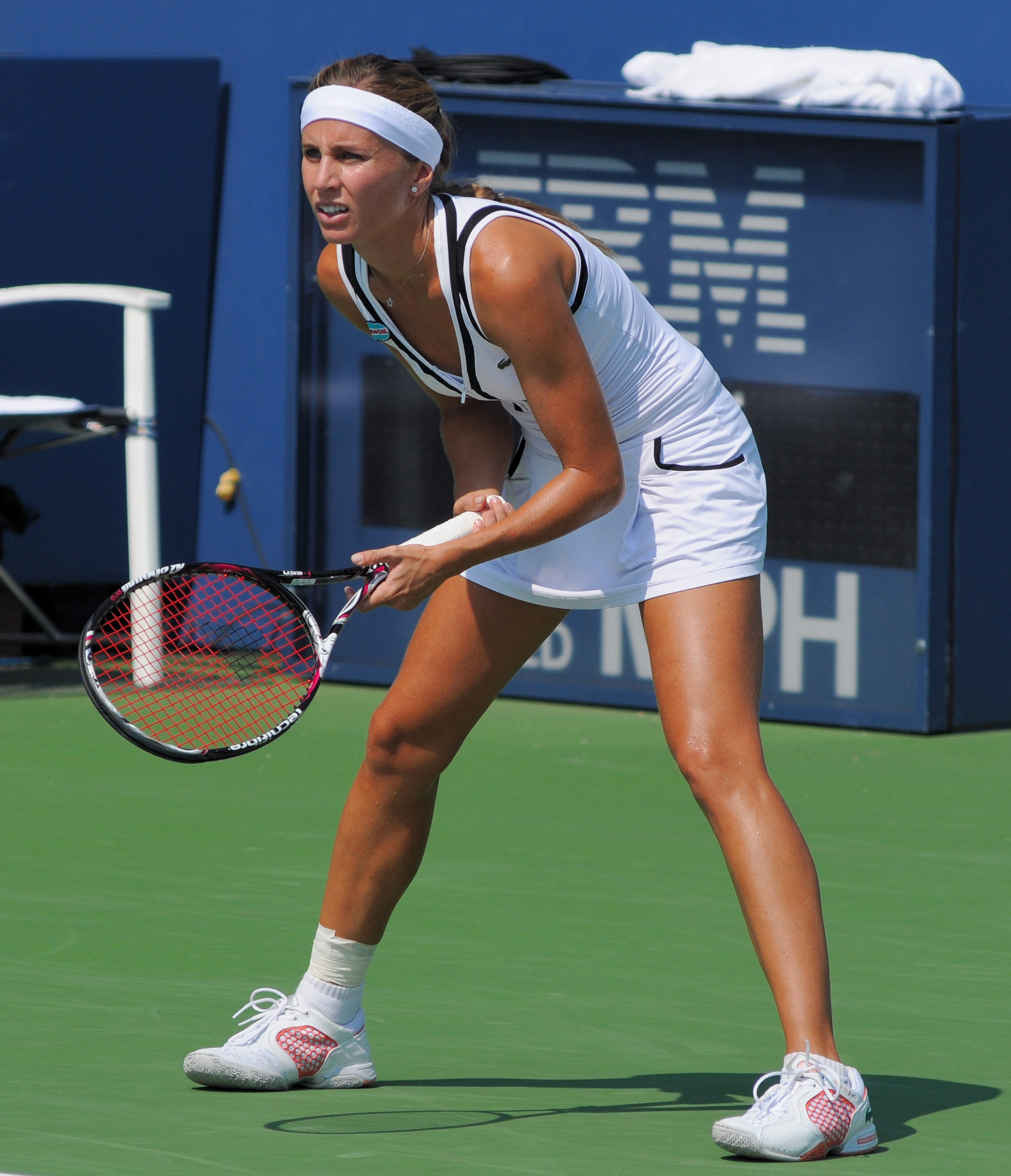
Dulko at the 2010 US Open

She again played at the Hong Kong Tennis Classic, and won Silver Group Championships with Venus Williams and Michael Chang, and then she started the year at the Hobart International, where she reached the quarter-finals, losing to Medina Garrigues. At the Australian Open, she upset Ana Ivanovic in the second round before losing to the ninth seed Vera Zvonareva. She then played in Copa BBVA-Colsanitas as the top seed, and made it to the semi-finals before being upset by Angelique Kerber. At the same tournament, she won the doubles title with Edina Gallovits. She then played in the Abierto Mexicano Telcel as the third seed, but lost to the fifth-seeded Carla Suárez Navarro in the semi-finals.

Seeded 31st at the BNP Paribas Open in Indian Wells, she gained the biggest victory of her career by defeating the former world No. 1, Justine Henin. In the third round, she lost to the No. 5 seed, Agnieszka Radwańska.

Unseeded at the Sony Ericsson Open, Dulko reached the third round by defeating Olga Govortsova and the No. 21 seed Alona Bondarenko. She then lost to Marion Bartoli. In the doubles, Dulko and Flavia Pennetta won their first WTA Premier title, beating Petrova and Samantha Stosur in three sets.

Dulko and Pennetta also won the Porsche Tennis Grand Prix in Stuttgart and the Internazionali d'Italia in Rome, and extended their winning streak to 19 matches before losing in the final of the Madrid Open to Serena and Venus Williams.

Dulko caused the first upset of the French Open with a first round victory over the No. 10 seed, Victoria Azarenka. Dulko was then defeated by Chanelle Scheepers in the second round. Dulko lost in the first round of her Wimbledon campaign by Monica Niculescu. She and Pennetta reached the semi-finals of the doubles event.

Dulko then played at the Swedish Open in Båstad, where she was seeded 4th. Although Dulko overcame Pennetta in the semi-finals, she fell in the final to the French No. 2 seed, Aravane Rezaï, in three sets. Dulko and Pennetta went on to defend their doubles title by defeating the Czech pair of Renata Voráčová and Barbora Záhlavová-Strýcová.

Dulko and Pennetta won a marathon doubles final at the Rogers Cup in Montreal, beating Květa Peschke and Katarina Srebotnik, for their fifth title of the season. Their next event together was the US Open, in which they were the top seeds but lost in the quarter-finals to Vania King and Yaroslava Shvedova, the eventual champions. In the singles, Dulko reached to the third round before losing to the No. 20 seed, Anastasia Pavlyuchenkova.

At the China Open in Beijing, Dulko made it to the second round before falling to Maria Kirilenko. In the doubles, Dulko and Pennetta lost in the final to Olga Govortsova and Chan Yung-jan, and then won their sixth event of the season at the Kremlin Cup in Moscow. Dulko and Pennetta were invited to the Tour Championships in Doha as the top seeds, and defeated Peschke and Srebotnik in the final to win the year-end championship.

On 1 November 2010, Dulko became the world No. 1 ranked doubles player.

=== 2011–2012 ===
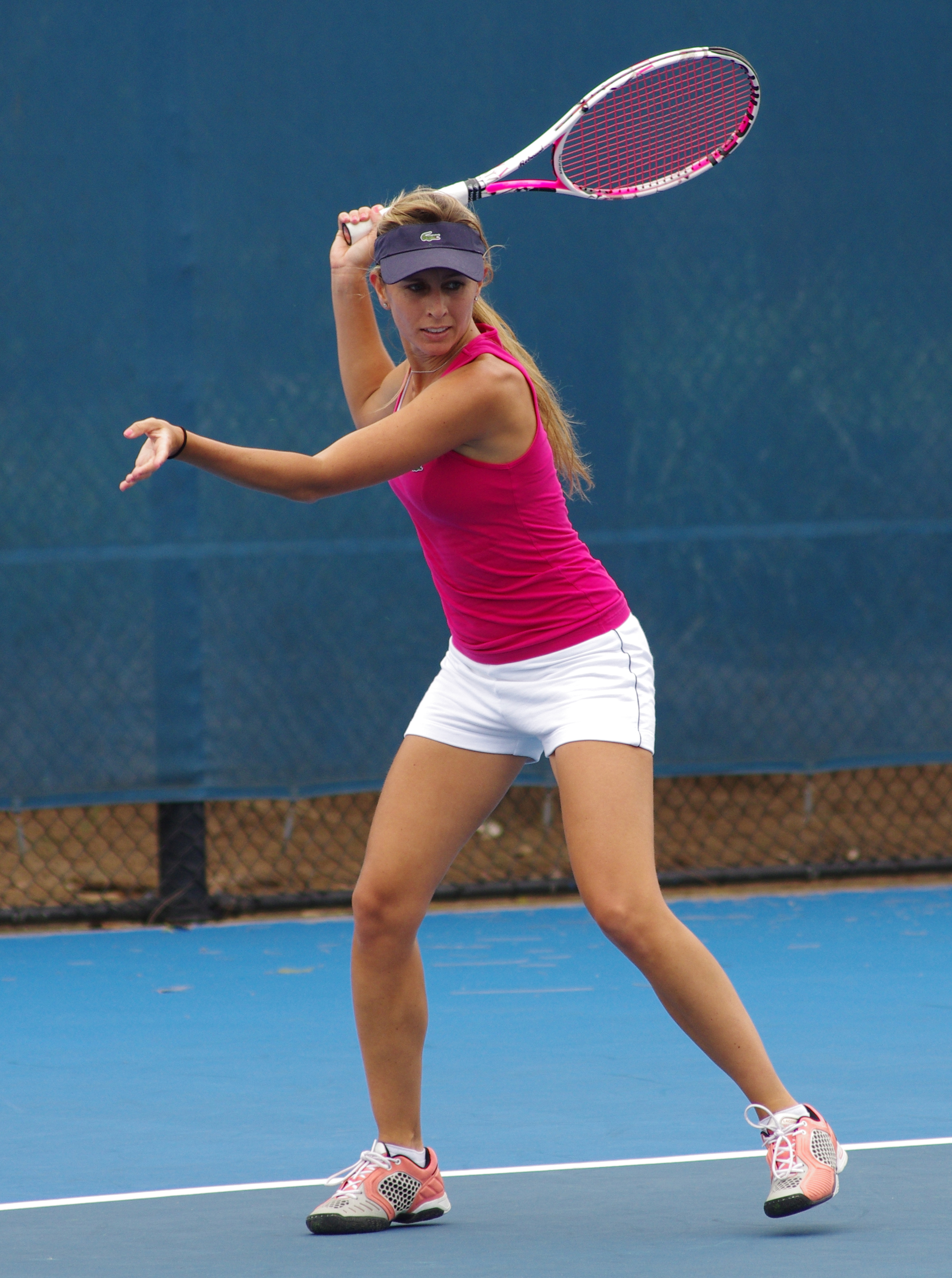
Dulko in 2012

Dulko and Pennetta to won their first Grand Slam event title at the 2011 Australian Open, defeating Azarenka and Kirilenko 2–6, 7–5, 6–1 in the final.

Dulko reached her first singles final of the year at the Abierto Mexicano Telcel, where she was the fourth seed. There she defeated Arantxa Parra Santonja to win her fourth career singles title. She struggled in her next few tournaments, losing in the first rounds of Miami, Madrid, and Rome, and only reaching the second round at the BNP Paribas Open, but found form again at the French Open, advancing to the fourth round by defeating the 2010 finalist Stosur in three sets. However, she was forced to retire due to a leg injury in the second set of her match against Bartoli.

Partnering Eduardo Schwank, Dulko was runner-up in the mixed doubles at the 2011 US Open, losing to Melanie Oudin and Jack Sock in the final which went to a deciding champions tiebreak.

Aged 27, Dulko announced her retirement from professional tennis in November 2012, stating that she no longer had the "same drive" and willingness to make the "sacrifices" needed to compete on the WTA circuit.

== Career statistics ==
=== Grand Slam finals ===
==== Doubles: 1 (1–0) ====
Result	Year	Championship	Surface	Partner	Opponents	Score
Win	2011	Australian Open	Hard	(Italy) Flavia Pennetta	(Belarus) Victoria Azarenka (Russia) Maria Kirilenko	2–6, 7–5, 6–1

==== Mixed doubles: 1 (0–1) ====
Result	Year	Championship	Surface	Partner	Opponents	Score
Loss	2011	US Open	Hard	(Argentina) Eduardo Schwank	(United States) Melanie Oudin (United States) Jack Sock	7–6^{(7–4)}, 4–6, [10–8]

=== Doubles performance timeline ===
Key
W	F	SF	QF	#R	RR	Q#	DNQ	A	NH

(W) winner; (F) finalist; (SF) semifinalist; (QF) quarterfinalist; (#R) rounds 4, 3, 2, 1; (RR) round-robin stage; (Q#) qualification round; (DNQ) did not qualify; (A) absent; (NH) not held; (SR) strike rate (events won / competed); (W–L) win–loss record.

Tournament	2002	2003	2004	2005	2006	2007	2008	2009	2010	2011	2012	W–L
Grand Slam tournaments
Australian Open	A	A	2R	2R	QF	3R	1R	2R	QF	W	3R	19–8
French Open	A	2R	3R	2R	3R	QF	1R	2R	QF	QF	2R	17–10
Wimbledon	1R	1R	3R	1R	1R	1R	2R	2R	SF	A	A	6–9
US Open	A	1R	1R	3R	1R	3R	2R	3R	QF	3R	A	12–8
Win–loss	0–1	1–3	5–4	4–4	5–4	7–4	2–4	5–4	13–4	9–1	3–2	54–35
Year-end championships
WTA Finals	A	A	A	A	A	A	A	A	W	SF	A	2–1
Titles/Runner-ups	0–1	1–0	0–2	3–1	2–2	0–0	0–0	2–3	8–2	1–0	0–0	17–11
Year-end ranking	125	96	34	26	29	23	132	27	1	9	46	N/A

== Personal life ==
Dulko was married to the Argentine international footballer Fernando Gago. The couple has two sons and a daughter. The couple separated in 2021, after he had an affair with one of her friends.

== Awards ==
- 2010 — WTA Award for Doubles Team of the Year (with Flavia Pennetta)
- 2010 — ITF Doubles World Champion (with Flavia Pennetta)

Awards and achievements
Preceded by (United States) Serena Williams & (United States) Venus Williams	WTA Doubles Team of the Year (with (Italy) Flavia Pennetta); 2010	Succeeded by (Slovenia) Katarina Srebotnik & (Czech Republic) Květa Peschke
Preceded by (United States) Serena Williams & (United States) Venus Williams	ITF Doubles World Champion (with (Italy) Flavia Pennetta); 2010	Succeeded by (Slovenia) Katarina Srebotnik & (Czech Republic) Květa Peschke
