= 2010 WTA Tour Championships – Singles =

Singles
- 2010 WTA Tour Championships

Final
- Champion: (Belgium) Kim Clijsters
- Runner-up: (Denmark) Caroline Wozniacki
- Score: 6–3, 5–7, 6–3

Details
- Draw: 8 (RR + elimination)
- Seeds: 8

Events
Singles	Doubles
- WTA Tour Championships

Kim Clijsters defeated Caroline Wozniacki in the final, 6–3, 5–7, 6–3 to win the singles tennis title at the 2010 WTA Tour Championships. It was her third Tour Finals singles title.

Serena Williams was the defending champion but did not participate due to a foot injury.

Wozniacki and Vera Zvonareva were in contention for the year-end WTA No. 1 singles ranking. Wozniacki retained the top ranking when she secured her place in the semifinals.

Francesca Schiavone and Samantha Stosur made their debuts in the event.

== Players ==
1. (Denmark) Caroline Wozniacki (final)
2. (Russia) Vera Zvonareva (semifinals)
3. (Belgium) Kim Clijsters (champion)
4. (Italy) Francesca Schiavone (round robin)
5. (Australia) Samantha Stosur (semifinals)
6. (Serbia) Jelena Janković (round robin)
7. (Russia) Elena Dementieva (round robin)
8. (Belarus) Victoria Azarenka (round robin)

Notes:

- (United States) Venus Williams had qualified but withdrew due to left knee injury
- (United States) Serena Williams had qualified but withdrew out due to foot injury

== Alternates ==
1. (China) Li Na (Not Used)
2. (Israel) Shahar Pe'er (Not Used)

== Draw ==
Key

- Q = Qualifier
- WC = Wild card
- LL = Lucky loser
- Alt = Alternate
- ITF = ITF entry
- PR = Protected ranking
- SR = Special ranking
- SE = Special exempt
- JE = Junior exempt
- JR = Junior Accelerator Programme entrant
- CO = College Accelerator Programme entrant
- NG = Next Gen Accelerator Program entrant
- w/o = Walkover
- r = Retired
- d = Defaulted

=== Finals ===
Semifinals
5	(Australia) Samantha Stosur	6^{3}	1
3	(Belgium) Kim Clijsters	7^{7}	6
2	(Russia) Vera Zvonareva	5	0
1	(Denmark) Caroline Wozniacki	7	6

Final
3	(Belgium) Kim Clijsters	6	5	6
1	(Denmark) Caroline Wozniacki	3	7	3

=== Maroon group ===
		(Denmark) Wozniacki	(Italy) Schiavone	(Australia) Stosur	(Russia) Dementieva	RR; W–L	Set; W–L	Game; W–L	Standings
1	(Denmark) Caroline Wozniacki		3–6, 6–1, 6–1	4–6, 3–6	6–1, 6–1	2–1	4–3 (57%)	34–22 (61%)	2
4	(Italy) Francesca Schiavone	6–3, 1–6, 1–6		4–6, 4–6	6–4, 6–2	1–2	3–4 (43%)	28–33 (46%)	3
5	(Australia) Samantha Stosur	6–4, 6–3	6–4, 6–4		6–4, 4–6, 6–7^{(4–7)}	2–1	5–2 (71%)	41–33 (55%)	1
7	(Russia) Elena Dementieva	1–6, 1–6	4–6, 2–6	4–6, 6–4, 7–6^{(7–4)}		1–2	2–5 (29%)	25–41 (38%)	4

Standings are determined by: 1. number of wins; 2. number of matches; 3. in two-players-ties, head-to-head records; 4. in three-players-ties, percentage of sets won, or of games won; 5. steering-committee decision.

=== White group ===
		(Russia) Zvonareva	(Belgium) Clijsters	(Serbia) Janković	(Belarus) Azarenka	RR; W–L	Set; W–L	Game; W–L	Standings
2	(Russia) Vera Zvonareva		6–4, 7–5	6–3, 6–0	7–6^{(7–4)}, 6–4	3–0	6–0 (100%)	38–22 (63%)	1
3	(Belgium) Kim Clijsters	4–6, 5–7		6–2, 6–3	6–4, 5–7, 6–1	2–1	4–3 (57%)	38–30 (56%)	2
6	(Serbia) Jelena Janković	3–6, 0–6	2–6, 3–6		4–6, 1–6	0–3	0–6 (0%)	13–36 (27%)	4
8	(Belarus) Victoria Azarenka	6–7^{(4–7)}, 4–6	4–6, 7–5, 1–6	6–4, 6–1		1–2	3–4 (43%)	34–35 (49%)	3

Standings are determined by: 1. number of wins; 2. number of matches; 3. in two-players-ties, head-to-head records; 4. in three-players-ties, percentage of sets won, or of games won; 5. steering-committee decision.

== See also ==
- WTA Tour Championships appearances
