= 2010 Australian Open =

- Date: 18–31 January 2010
- Edition: 98th
- Category: Grand Slam (ITF)
- Surface: Hardcourt (Plexicushion)
- Location: Melbourne, Australia
- Venue: Melbourne Park

Champions

Men's singles
- (Switzerland) Roger Federer

Women's singles
- (United States) Serena Williams

Men's doubles
- (United States) Bob Bryan / (United States) Mike Bryan

Women's doubles
- (United States) Serena Williams / (United States) Venus Williams

Mixed doubles
- (Zimbabwe) Cara Black / (India) Leander Paes

Wheelchair men's singles
- (Japan) Shingo Kunieda

Wheelchair women's singles
- (Netherlands) Korie Homan

Wheelchair quad singles
- (United Kingdom) Peter Norfolk

Wheelchair men's doubles
- (France) Stéphane Houdet / (Japan) Shingo Kunieda

Wheelchair women's doubles
- (France) Florence Gravellier / (Netherlands) Aniek Van Koot

Wheelchair quad doubles
- (United States) Nicholas Taylor / (United States) David Wagner

Boys' singles
- (Brazil) Tiago Fernandes

Girls' singles
- (Czech Republic) Karolína Plíšková

Boys' doubles
- (Netherlands) Justin Eleveld / (Netherlands) Jannick Lupescu

Girls' doubles
- (Slovakia) Jana Čepelová / (Slovakia) Chantal Škamlová
- Australian Open

The 2010 Australian Open was a tennis tournament that took place in Melbourne Park in Melbourne, Australia, from 18 to 31 January. It was the 98th edition of the Australian Open, and the first Grand Slam event of the year.

In the singles competition, Rafael Nadal and Serena Williams were the defending champions. Williams was able to retain her title with a win over Justine Henin, 6–4, 3–6, 6–2 in the final, while Nadal retired in his quarterfinals match against Andy Murray owing to a quadriceps injury. Roger Federer was the men's champion, defeating finalist Andy Murray in straight sets 6–3, 6–4, 7–6(11).

In doubles, the 2009 champion pairs were successful in their respective title defenses – Bob and Mike Bryan in men's doubles and Serena and Venus Williams in women's doubles. Sania Mirza and Mahesh Bhupathi were not able to defend their mixed doubles title because they withdrew from the event beforehand. In mixed doubles, Cara Black and Leander Paes won the title, which made a mixed doubles career grand slam for Black.

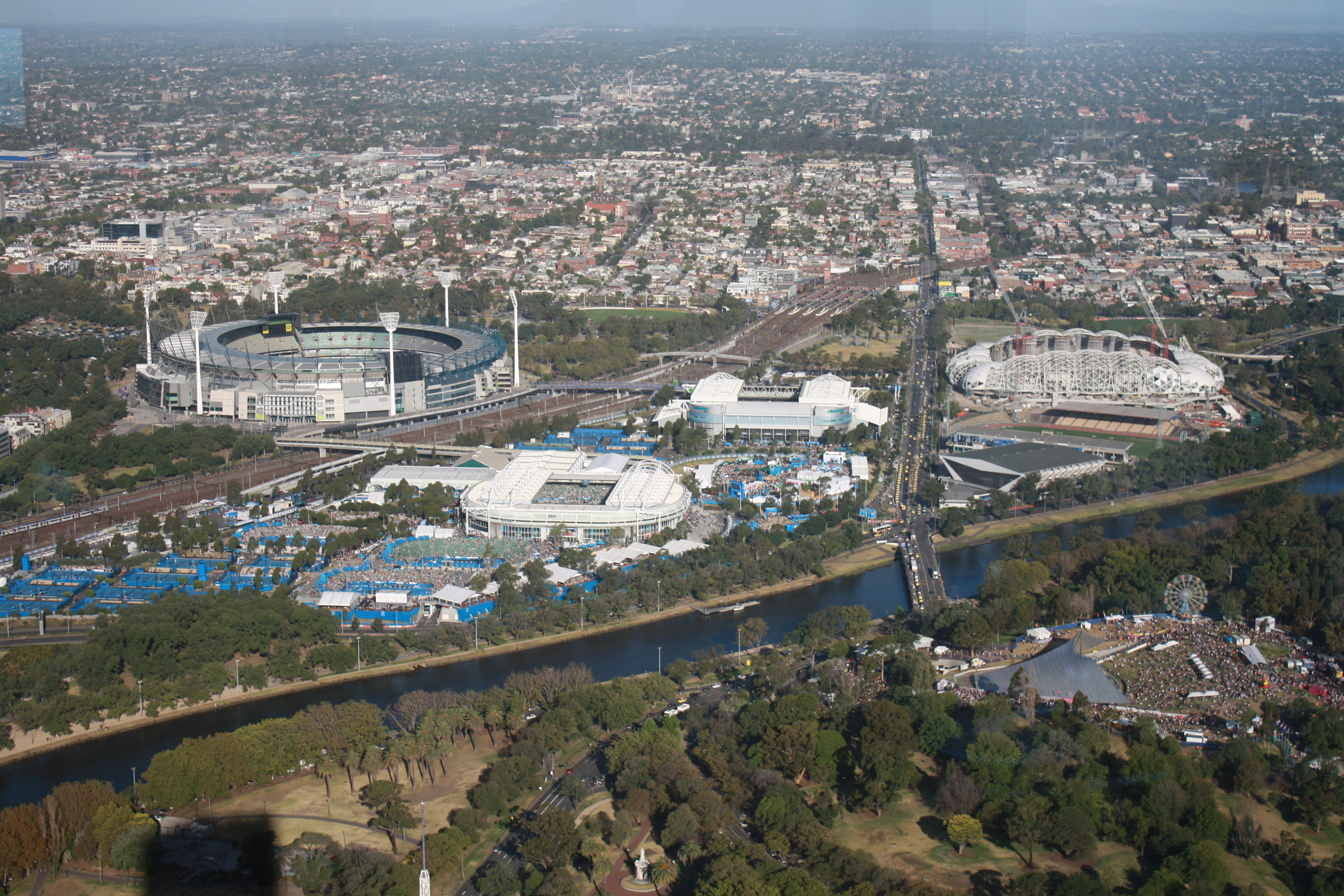
Melbourne Park during the 2010 Australian Open

== Point distribution ==
Below is a series of tables for each of the competitions showing the ranking points on offer for each event.

=== Senior ===
| Event | W | F | SF | QF | Round of 16 | Round of 32 | Round of 64 | Round of 128 | Q | Q3 | Q2 | Q1 |
| Men's singles | 2000 | 1200 | 720 | 360 | 180 | 90 | 45 | 10 | 25 | 16 | 8 | 0 |
| Men's doubles | 2000 | 1200 | 720 | 360 | 180 | 90 | 0 | — | — | — | — | — |
| Women's singles | 2000 | 1400 | 900 | 500 | 280 | 160 | 100 | 5 | 60 | 50 | 40 | 2 |
| Women's doubles | 2000 | 1400 | 900 | 500 | 280 | 160 | 5 | — | — | — | — | — |

=== Wheelchair ===
| Event | W | F | SF/3rd | QF/4th |
| Singles | 800 | 500 | 375 | 100 |
| Doubles | 800 | 500 | 100 | — |
| Quad singles | 800 | 500 | 375 | 100 |
| Quad doubles | 800 | 100 | — | — |

=== Junior ===
| Event | W | F | SF | QF | Round of 16 | Round of 32 | Q | Q3 |
| Boys' singles | 375 | 270 | 180 | 120 | 75 | 30 | 25 | 20 |
| Girls' singles | 375 | 270 | 180 | 120 | 75 | 30 | 25 | 20 |
| Boys' doubles | 270 | 180 | 120 | 75 | 45 | — | — | — |
| Girls' doubles | 270 | 180 | 120 | 75 | 45 | — | — | — |

== Singles players ==
Men's singles

| Champion | | Runner-up | |
|---|---|---|---|
| (Switzerland) Roger Federer (1) | | (United Kingdom) Andy Murray (5) | |
Semifinals out
| (France) Jo-Wilfried Tsonga (10) | | (Croatia) Marin Čilić (14) | |
Quarterfinals out
| (Russia) Nikolay Davydenko (6) | (Serbia) Novak Djokovic (3) | (United States) Andy Roddick (7) | (Spain) Rafael Nadal (2) |
4th round out
| (Australia) Lleyton Hewitt (22) | (Spain) Fernando Verdasco (9) | (Poland) Łukasz Kubot | (Spain) Nicolás Almagro (26) |
| (Chile) Fernando González (11) | (Argentina) Juan Martín del Potro (4) | (United States) John Isner (33) | (Croatia) Ivo Karlović |
3rd round out
| (Spain) Albert Montañés (31) | (Cyprus) Marcos Baghdatis | (Austria) Stefan Koubek | (Argentina) Juan Mónaco (30) |
| (Uzbekistan) Denis Istomin | (Russia) Mikhail Youzhny (20) | (Germany) Tommy Haas (18) | (Colombia) Alejandro Falla |
| (Spain) Feliciano López | (Kazakhstan) Evgeny Korolev | (Switzerland) Stanislas Wawrinka (19) | (Germany) Florian Mayer |
| (France) Florent Serra | (France) Gaël Monfils (12) | (Croatia) Ivan Ljubičić (24) | (Germany) Philipp Kohlschreiber (27) |
2nd round out
| (Romania) Victor Hănescu | (France) Stéphane Robert | (United States) Donald Young | (Spain) David Ferrer (17) |
| (Ukraine) Ivan Sergeyev | (Croatia) Ivan Dodig | (France) Michaël Llodra | (Ukraine) Illya Marchenko |
| (Switzerland) Marco Chiudinelli | (Germany) Michael Berrer | (Czech Republic) Jan Hájek | (Colombia) Santiago Giraldo |
| (United States) Taylor Dent | (Serbia) Janko Tipsarević | (Germany) Benjamin Becker | (Spain) Marcel Granollers |
| (Brazil) Thomaz Bellucci | (Germany) Rainer Schüttler | (Czech Republic) Tomáš Berdych (21) | (Turkey) Marsel İlhan |
| (Australia) Bernard Tomic | (Russia) Igor Kunitsyn | (Serbia) Viktor Troicki (29) | (United States) James Blake |
| (France) Marc Gicquel | (Finland) Jarkko Nieminen | (Republic of Ireland) Louk Sorensen | (Croatia) Antonio Veić |
| (France) Julien Benneteau | (Kazakhstan) Andrey Golubev | (United States) Wayne Odesnik | (Slovakia) Lukáš Lacko |
1st round out
| (Russia) Igor Andreev | (Argentina) Juan Ignacio Chela | (Italy) Potito Starace | (Spain) Óscar Hernández |
| (Brazil) Ricardo Hocevar | (Belgium) Christophe Rochus | (Italy) Paolo Lorenzi | (Portugal) Frederico Gil |
| (Australia) Carsten Ball | (Israel) Dudi Sela | (United States) Rajeev Ram | (Spain) Juan Carlos Ferrero (23) |
| (Latvia) Ernests Gulbis | (Argentina) Martín Vassallo Argüello | (Spain) Carlos Moyá | (Germany) Dieter Kindlmann |
| (Spain) Daniel Gimeno Traver | (Australia) Marinko Matosevic | (Belgium) Kristof Vliegen | (France) Jérémy Chardy |
| (France) Richard Gasquet | (United States) Robby Ginepri | (Germany) Mischa Zverev | (Spain) Tommy Robredo (16) |
| (Ukraine) Sergiy Stakhovsky | (Italy) Fabio Fognini | (United States) Ryan Harrison | (Germany) Simon Greul |
| (Belgium) Xavier Malisse | (Slovenia) Grega Žemlja | (Brazil) Marcos Daniel | (Sweden) Robin Söderling (8) |
| (Netherlands) Thiemo de Bakker | (Russia) Teymuraz Gabashvili | (Uruguay) Pablo Cuevas | (United States) Sam Querrey (25) |
| (Netherlands) Robin Haase | (Germany) Daniel Brands | (France) Sébastien Grosjean | (Belgium) Olivier Rochus |
| (France) Fabrice Santoro | (France) Guillaume Rufin | (Argentina) José Acasuso | (Spain) Guillermo García López |
| (Ecuador) Nicolás Lapentti | (Germany) Philipp Petzschner | (France) Arnaud Clément | (United States) Michael Russell |
| (South Africa) Kevin Anderson | (Italy) Simone Bolelli | (Australia) Nick Lindahl | (Austria) Jürgen Melzer (28) |
| (Italy) Andreas Seppi | (Chinese Taipei) Lu Yen-hsun | (Austria) Daniel Köllerer | (Australia) Matthew Ebden |
| (Czech Republic) Radek Štěpánek (13) | (France) David Guez | (United States) Mardy Fish | (Australia) Jason Kubler |
| (Argentina) Horacio Zeballos | (Slovenia) Blaž Kavčič | (Argentina) Leonardo Mayer | (Australia) Peter Luczak |

Women's singles

| Champion | | Runner-up | |
|---|---|---|---|
| (United States) Serena Williams (1) | | (Belgium) Justine Henin | |
Semifinals out
| (China) Li Na (16) | | (China) Zheng Jie | |
Quarterfinals out
| (Belarus) Victoria Azarenka (7) | (United States) Venus Williams (6) | (Russia) Nadia Petrova (19) | (Russia) Maria Kirilenko |
4th round out
| (Australia) Samantha Stosur (13) | (Russia) Vera Zvonareva (9) | (Denmark) Caroline Wozniacki (4) | (Italy) Francesca Schiavone (17) |
| (Belgium) Yanina Wickmayer | (Russia) Svetlana Kuznetsova (3) | (Ukraine) Alona Bondarenko (31) | (Russia) Dinara Safina (2) |
3rd round out
| (Spain) Carla Suárez Navarro (32) | (Italy) Alberta Brianti | (Argentina) Gisela Dulko | (Italy) Tathiana Garbin |
| (Israel) Shahar Pe'er (29) | (Slovakia) Daniela Hantuchová (22) | (Poland) Agnieszka Radwańska (10) | (Australia) Casey Dellacqua |
| (Russia) Alisa Kleybanova (27) | (Italy) Sara Errani | (Belgium) Kim Clijsters (15) | (Germany) Angelique Kerber |
| (Serbia) Jelena Janković (8) | (France) Marion Bartoli (11) | (Italy) Roberta Vinci | (United Kingdom) Elena Baltacha |

== Seniors ==
=== Men's singles ===
(Switzerland) Roger Federer defeated (United Kingdom) Andy Murray, 6–3, 6–4, 7–6^{(13–11)}

- This was Federer's first title of the year and his 62nd overall. It was his 16th career Grand Slam title, and his 4th Australian Open title tying Andre Agassi for most Australian Open titles in the Open Era (Novak Djokovic later surpassed this record by winning his 5th title in 2015, while Federer won the title for the 5th time in 2017). This was Federer's 5th final at the Australian Open which tied him with Stefan Edberg for the Open Era record.

=== Women's singles ===
(United States) Serena Williams defeated (Belgium) Justine Henin, 6–4, 3–6, 6–2

- This was Williams's first title of the year, a record 5th Australian Open title in the Open Era. The title was Williams' 12th major title, which tied her for 6th all-time with Billie Jean King and Suzanne Lenglen, and in the Open Era solo 4th having surpassed Court's 11 mark, which Williams' is behind Graf (22), Evert and Navratilova with (18) each.

=== Men's doubles ===
(United States) Bob Bryan / (United States) Mike Bryan defeated (Canada) Daniel Nestor / (Serbia) Nenad Zimonjić, 6–3, 6–7^{(5–7)}, 6–3

- This was the Bryan brothers' 57th doubles title together, 4th Australian Open title, and 8th major title.

=== Women's doubles ===
(United States) Serena Williams / (United States) Venus Williams defeated (Zimbabwe) Cara Black / (United States) Liezel Huber, 6–4, 6–3

- This is the Williams Sisters' 11th Grand Slam doubles title together and 4th Australian Open title.

=== Mixed doubles ===
(Zimbabwe) Cara Black / (India) Leander Paes defeated (Russia) Ekaterina Makarova / (Czech Republic) Jaroslav Levinský, 7–5, 6–3

This was the pair's 3rd consecutive grand slam final and the 4th overall. The victory makes Paes India's joint-lead grand slam winner alongside his ex- doubles partner Mahesh Bhupathi with a total of 11 grand slam doubles titles. This title gave Black a career mixed doubles grand slam, which Black has won one of each slam in mixed doubles.

== Juniors ==
=== Boys' singles ===
(Brazil) Tiago Fernandes defeated (Australia) Sean Berman, 7-6 (7-5), 6–3

=== Girls' singles ===
(Czech Republic) Karolína Plíšková defeated (United Kingdom) Laura Robson, 6–1, 7–6(5)

=== Boys' doubles ===
(Netherlands) Justin Eleveld / (Netherlands) Jannick Lupescu defeated (Germany) Kevin Krawietz / (Germany) Dominik Schulz, 6–4, 6–4

=== Girls' doubles ===
(Slovakia) Jana Čepelová / (Slovakia) Chantal Škamlová defeated (Hungary) Tímea Babos / (Canada) Gabriela Dabrowski, 7–6(1), 6–2

== Other events ==
=== Wheelchair men's singles ===
(Japan) Shingo Kunieda defeated (France) Stéphane Houdet, 7–6(3), 2–6, 7–5

=== Wheelchair women's singles ===
(Netherlands) Korie Homan defeated (France) Florence Gravellier, 6–2, 6–2

=== Wheelchair quad singles ===
(United Kingdom) Peter Norfolk defeated (United States) David Wagner, 6–2, 7–6(4)

=== Wheelchair men's doubles ===
(France) Stéphane Houdet / (Japan) Shingo Kunieda defeated (Netherlands) Maikel Scheffers / (Netherlands) Robin Ammerlaan, 6–2, 6–2

=== Wheelchair women's doubles ===
(France) Florence Gravellier / (Netherlands) Aniek Van Koot defeated (United Kingdom) Lucy Shuker / (Australia) Daniela Di Toro, 6–3, 7–6(2)

=== Wheelchair quad doubles ===
(United States) Nicholas Taylor / (United States) David Wagner defeated (United Kingdom) Peter Norfolk / (Sweden) Johan Andersson, 6–2, 7–6(5)

== Singles seeds ==
=== Men's singles ===
| Sd | Rank | Player | Points | Points defending | Points won | New points | Status |
|---|---|---|---|---|---|---|---|
| 1 | 1 | (Switzerland) Roger Federer | 10550 | 1200 | 2000 | 11350 | Champion, won in the final against Andy Murray [5] |
| 2 | 2 | (Spain) Rafael Nadal | 9310 | 2000 | 360 | 7670 | Retired in quarterfinal to Andy Murray [5] |
| 3 | 3 | (Serbia) Novak Djokovic | 8310 | 360 | 360 | 8310 | Quarterfinal lost to Jo-Wilfried Tsonga [10] |
| 4 | 5 | (Argentina) Juan Martín del Potro | 6785 | 360 | 180 | 6605 | 4th round lost to Marin Čilić [14] |
| 5 | 4 | (United Kingdom) Andy Murray | 6780 | 180 | 1200 | 7800 | Runner-Up, Final lost to Roger Federer [1] |
| 6 | 6 | (Russia) Nikolay Davydenko | 4930 | 0 | 360 | 5290 | Quarterfinal lost to Roger Federer [1] |
| 7 | 7 | (United States) Andy Roddick | 4510 | 720 | 360 | 4150 | Quarterfinal lost to Marin Čilić [14] |
| 8 | 8 | (Sweden) Robin Söderling | 3410 | 45 | 10 | 3375 | 1st round lost to Marcel Granollers |
| 9 | 9 | (Spain) Fernando Verdasco | 3300 | 720 | 180 | 2760 | 4th round lost to Nikolay Davydenko [6] |
| 10 | 10 | (France) Jo-Wilfried Tsonga | 2875 | 360 | 720 | 3235 | Semifinal lost to Roger Federer [1] |
| 11 | 11 | (Chile) Fernando González | 2870 | 180 | 180 | 2870 | 4th round lost to Andy Roddick [7] |
| 12 | 12 | (France) Gaël Monfils | 2610 | 180 | 90 | 2520 | 3rd round lost to John Isner [33] |
| 13 | 13 | (Czech Republic) Radek Štěpánek | 2525 | 90 | 10 | 2445 | 1st round lost to Ivo Karlović |
| 14 | 14 | (Croatia) Marin Čilić | 2430 | 180 | 720 | 2970 | Semifinal lost to Andy Murray [5] |
| 15 | 15 | (France) Gilles Simon | 2275 | 360 | 0 | 1915 | Withdrew before the tournament |
| 16 | 16 | (Spain) Tommy Robredo | 2175 | 180 | 10 | 2005 | 1st round lost to Santiago Giraldo |
| 17 | 18 | (Spain) David Ferrer | 1825 | 90 | 45 | 1780 | 2nd round lost to Marcos Baghdatis |
| 18 | 17 | (Germany) Tommy Haas | 1855 | 90 | 90 | 1855 | 3rd round lost to Jo-Wilfried Tsonga [10] |
| 19 | 19 | (Switzerland) Stanislas Wawrinka | 1765 | 90 | 90 | 1765 | 3rd round lost to Marin Čilić |
| 20 | 20 | (Russia) Mikhail Youzhny | 1690 | 10 | 90 | 1770 | Withdrew in 3rd round to Łukasz Kubot |
| 21 | 21 | (Czech Republic) Tomáš Berdych | 1680 | 180 | 45 | 1545 | 2nd round lost to Evgeny Korolev |
| 22 | 22 | (Australia) Lleyton Hewitt | 1600 | 10 | 180 | 1770 | 4th round lost to Roger Federer [1] |
| 23 | 23 | (Spain) Juan Carlos Ferrero | 1555 | 10 | 10 | 1555 | 1st round lost to Ivan Dodig [Q] |
| 24 | 24 | (Croatia) Ivan Ljubičić | 1405 | 45 | 90 | 1450 | 3rd round lost to Ivo Karlović |
| 25 | 29 | (United States) Sam Querrey | 1240 | 10 | 10 | 1240 | 1st round lost to Rainer Schüttler |
| 26 | 25 | (Spain) Nicolás Almagro | 1305 | 90 | 180 | 1395 | 4th round lost to Jo-Wilfried Tsonga [10] |
| 27 | 26 | (Germany) Philipp Kohlschreiber | 1260 | 45 | 90 | 1305 | 3rd round lost to Rafael Nadal [2] |
| 28 | 27 | (Austria) Jürgen Melzer | 1260 | 90 | 10 | 1180 | 1st round lost to Florent Serra |
| 29 | 30 | (Serbia) Viktor Troicki | 1220 | 45 | 45 | 1220 | 2nd round lost to Florian Mayer |
| 30 | 33 | (Argentina) Juan Mónaco | 1170 | 10 | 90 | 1260 | 3rd round lost to Nikolay Davydenko [6] |
| 31 | 32 | (Spain) Albert Montañés | 1185 | 10 | 90 | 1265 | 3rd round lost to Roger Federer [1] |
| 32 | 34 | (France) Jérémy Chardy | 1090 | 45 | 10 | 1065 | 1st round lost to Denis Istomin |
| 33 | 28 | (United States) John Isner | 1260 | 10 | 180 | 1430 | 4th round lost to Andy Murray [5] |

=== Women's singles ===
| Sd | Rank | Player | Points | Points defending | Points won | New points | Status |
|---|---|---|---|---|---|---|---|
| 1 | 1 | (United States) Serena Williams | 9195 | 2000 | 2000 | 9195 | Champion, won in the final against Justine Henin [WC] |
| 2 | 2 | (Russia) Dinara Safina | 7600 | 1400 | 280 | 6480 | Retired in 4th round to Maria Kirilenko |
| 3 | 3 | (Russia) Svetlana Kuznetsova | 6081 | 500 | 280 | 5861 | 4th round lost to Nadia Petrova [19] |
| 4 | 4 | (Denmark) Caroline Wozniacki | 5785 | 160 | 280 | 5905 | 4th round lost to Li Na [16] |
| 5 | 5 | (Russia) Elena Dementieva | 5505 | 900 | 100 | 4705 | 2nd round lost to Justine Henin [WC] |
| 6 | 6 | (United States) Venus Williams | 5126 | 100 | 500 | 5526 | Quarterfinal lost to Li Na [16] |
| 7 | 7 | (Belarus) Victoria Azarenka | 4740 | 280 | 500 | 4960 | Quarterfinal lost to Serena Williams [1] |
| 8 | 8 | (Serbia) Jelena Janković | 3965 | 280 | 160 | 3845 | 3rd round lost to Alona Bondarenko [31] |
| 9 | 9 | (Russia) Vera Zvonareva | 3560 | 900 | 280 | 2940 | 4th round lost to Victoria Azarenka [7] |
| 10 | 10 | (Poland) Agnieszka Radwańska | 3450 | 5 | 160 | 3605 | 3rd round lost to Francesca Schiavone [17] |
| 11 | 11 | (France) Marion Bartoli | 3325 | 500 | 160 | 2985 | 3rd round lost Zheng Jie |
| 12 | 12 | (Italy) Flavia Pennetta | 3200 | 160 | 100 | 3140 | 2nd round lost to Yanina Wickmayer [Q] |
| 13 | 13 | (Australia) Samantha Stosur | 3045 | 160 | 280 | 3165 | 4th round lost to Serena Williams [1] |
| 14 | 14 | (Russia) Maria Sharapova | 2820 | 0 | 5 | 2825 | 1st round lost to Maria Kirilenko |
| 15 | 15 | (Belgium) Kim Clijsters | 2620 | 0 | 160 | 2780 | 3rd round lost Nadia Petrova [19] |
| 16 | 17 | (China) Li Na | 2541 | 0 | 900 | 3441 | Semifinal lost to Serena Williams [1] |
| 17 | 18 | (Italy) Francesca Schiavone | 2445 | 5 | 280 | 2720 | 4th round lost to Venus Williams [6] |
| 18 | 20 | (France) Virginie Razzano | 2200 | 160 | 5 | 2045 | 1st round lost to Ekaterina Makarova |
| 19 | 19 | (Russia) Nadia Petrova | 2220 | 280 | 500 | 2440 | Quarterfinal lost to Justine Henin [WC] |
| 20 | 21 | (Serbia) Ana Ivanovic | 2127 | 160 | 100 | 2067 | 2nd round lost to Gisela Dulko |
| 21 | 24 | (Germany) Sabine Lisicki | 2035 | 100 | 100 | 2035 | 2nd round lost to Alberta Brianti |
| 22 | 25 | (Slovakia) Daniela Hantuchová | 1985 | 160 | 160 | 1985 | 3rd round lost to Li Na [16] |
| 23 | 22 | (Slovakia) Dominika Cibulková | 2063 | 280 | 5 | 1788 | 1st round lost Vania King |
| 24 | 27 | (Spain) María José Martínez Sánchez | 1970 | 160 | 100 | 1910 | 2nd round lost to Zheng Jie |
| 25 | 26 | (Spain) Anabel Medina Garrigues | 1980 | 280 | 5 | 1705 | 1st round lost to Karolina Šprem |
| 26 | 23 | (France) Aravane Rezaï | 2055 | 5 | 100 | 2150 | 2nd round lost to Angelique Kerber [Q] |
| 27 | 31 | (Russia) Alisa Kleybanova | 1870 | 280 | 160 | 1750 | 3rd round lost Justine Henin [WC] |
| 28 | 29 | (Russia) Elena Vesnina | 1900 | 5 | 5 | 1900 | 1st round lost to Tathiana Garbin |
| 29 | 28 | (Israel) Shahar Pe'er | 1930 | 5 | 160 | 2085 | 3rd round lost to Caroline Wozniacki [4] |
| 30 | 32 | (Ukraine) Kateryna Bondarenko | 1740 | 160 | 100 | 1680 | 2nd round lost to Elena Baltacha |
| 31 | 30 | (Ukraine) Alona Bondarenko | 1900 | 160 | 280 | 2020 | 4th round lost to Zheng Jie |
| 32 | 33 | (Spain) Carla Suárez Navarro | 1715 | 500 | 160 | 1375 | 3rd round lost to Serena Williams [1] |

== Wildcard entries ==
=== Men's singles wildcard entries ===
1. (Australia) Carsten Ball
2. (Kazakhstan) Andrey Golubev
3. (France) Sébastien Grosjean
4. (United States) Ryan Harrison
5. (Australia) Jason Kubler
6. (Australia) Nick Lindahl
7. (Australia) Marinko Matosevic
8. (Australia) Bernard Tomic

=== Women's singles wildcard entries ===
1. (France) Stéphanie Cohen-Aloro
2. (Australia) Casey Dellacqua
3. (Australia) Jarmila Groth
4. (Belgium) Justine Henin
5. (Kazakhstan) Sesil Karatancheva
6. (Australia) Alicia Molik
7. (Australia) Olivia Rogowska
8. (United States) CoCo Vandeweghe

=== Men's doubles wildcard entries ===
1. (Australia) Marinko Matosevic / (Australia) Bernard Tomic
2. (India) Prakash Amritraj / (India) Somdev Devvarman
3. (Australia) Kaden Hensel / (Australia) Greg Jones
4. (Australia) Matthew Ebden / (Australia) Brydan Klein
5. (Australia) Rameez Junaid / (Australia) Peter Luczak
6. (Australia) Nick Lindahl / (Australia) Matt Reid
7. (Australia) Samuel Groth / (Australia) Jason Kubler

=== Women's doubles wildcard entries ===
1. (Australia) Shannon Golds / (Australia) Marija Mirkovic
2. (Indonesia) Yayuk Basuki / (Japan) Kimiko Date-Krumm
3. (Australia) Sally Peers / (United Kingdom) Laura Robson
4. (Australia) Jarmila Groth / (Australia) Olivia Rogowska
5. (Australia) Monique Adamczak / (Australia) Nicole Kriz
6. (Australia) Alicia Molik / (United States) Meghann Shaughnessy
7. (Australia) Sophie Ferguson / (Australia) Jessica Moore

=== Mixed doubles wildcard entries ===
1. (Australia) Sophie Ferguson / (Australia) Carsten Ball
2. (United States) Carly Gullickson / (Australia) Bernard Tomic
3. (Australia) Sally Peers / (Australia) Peter Luczak
4. (Australia) Alicia Molik / (Australia) Matthew Ebden
5. (Australia) Anastasia Rodionova / (Australia) Paul Hanley
6. (Australia) Jarmila Groth / (Australia) Samuel Groth
7. (Australia) Casey Dellacqua / (Australia) Jordan Kerr

== Protected ranking ==
The following players were accepted directly into the main draw using a protected ranking:

Men's singles

- (Netherlands) Robin Haase
- (Spain) Carlos Moyá
- (Belgium) Kristof Vliegen

Women's singles

- (New Zealand) Marina Erakovic
- (Austria) Tamira Paszek

== Qualifiers entries ==
=== Men's qualifiers entries ===
1. (Belgium) Xavier Malisse
2. (Australia) Matthew Ebden
3. (Slovenia) Grega Žemlja
4. (Croatia) Antonio Veić
5. (Republic of Ireland) Louk Sorensen
6. (France) Guillaume Rufin
7. (Brazil) Ricardo Hocevar
8. (United States) Donald Young
9. (Ukraine) Illya Marchenko
10. (Ukraine) Ivan Sergeyev
11. (South Africa) Kevin Anderson
12. (Slovenia) Blaž Kavčič
13. (Croatia) Ivan Dodig
14. (France) David Guez
15. (Austria) Stefan Koubek
16. (Germany) Dieter Kindlmann

The following players received lucky loser spots in the men's draw:

1. (Turkey) Marsel İlhan

=== Women's qualifiers entries ===
1. (Belgium) Yanina Wickmayer
2. (Russia) Regina Kulikova
3. (United States) Shenay Perry
4. (China) Han Xinyun
5. (Czech Republic) Renata Voráčová
6. (Sweden) Sofia Arvidsson
7. (Germany) Angelique Kerber
8. (Austria) Yvonne Meusburger
9. (Ukraine) Yuliana Fedak
10. (Slovakia) Zuzana Kučová
11. (Canada) Valérie Tétreault
12. (Germany) Kathrin Wörle

== Withdrawals ==
Men's singles

- (Croatia) Mario Ančić → replaced by (Russia) Igor Kunitsyn
- (Germany) Andreas Beck → replaced by (Netherlands) Robin Haase
- (Argentina) Máximo González → replaced by (Colombia) Santiago Giraldo
- (Belgium) Xavier Malisse → replaced by (Czech Republic) Jan Hájek
- (France) Paul-Henri Mathieu → replaced by (Russia) Teymuraz Gabashvili
- (Argentina) David Nalbandian → replaced by (France) Stéphane Robert
- (France) Gilles Simon → replaced by (Turkey) Marsel İlhan
- (Russia) Dmitry Tursunov → replaced by (United States) Wayne Odesnik

Women's singles

- (United Kingdom) Anne Keothavong → replaced by (France) Pauline Parmentier
- (Switzerland) Patty Schnyder → replaced by (Belarus) Anastasiya Yakimova

== Point distribution ==
| Stage | Men's singles | Men's doubles | Women's singles | Women's doubles |
|---|---|---|---|---|
| Champion | 2000 | | | |
| Finals | 1200 | | 1400 | |
| Semifinals | 720 | | 900 | |
| Quarterfinals | 360 | | 500 | |
| Round of 16 | 180 | | 280 | |
| Round of 32 | 90 | | 160 | |
| Round of 64 | 45 | 0 | 100 | 5 |
| Round of 128 | 10 | – | 5 | – |
| Qualifier | 25 | – | 60 | – |
| Qualifying 3rd round | 16 | – | 50 | – |
| Qualifying 2nd round | 8 | – | 40 | – |
| Qualifying 1st round | 0 | – | 2 | – |

== Prize money ==
All prize money is in Australian dollars (A$); doubles prize money is distributed per pair.

=== Men's and women's singles ===
- Winners: $2,200,168
- Runners-up: $1,050,000
- Semi-finalists: $400,000
- Quarter-finalists: $200,000
- Fourth round: $89,000
- Third round: $52,000
- Second round: $31,500
- First round: $19,500

=== Men's and women's doubles ===
- Winners: $450,000
- Runners-up: $225,000
- Semi-finalists: $112,000
- Quarter-finalists: $55,400
- Third round: $31,245
- Second round: $17,035
- First round: $9,585

=== Mixed doubles ===
- Winners: $134,460
- Runners-up: $67,230
- Semi-finalists: $33,615
- Quarter-finalists: $15,490
- Second round: $7,745
- First round: $3,755

| Preceded by 2009 US Open | Grand Slams | Succeeded by 2010 French Open |
