= Francesca Schiavone =

Italian tennis player (born 1980)

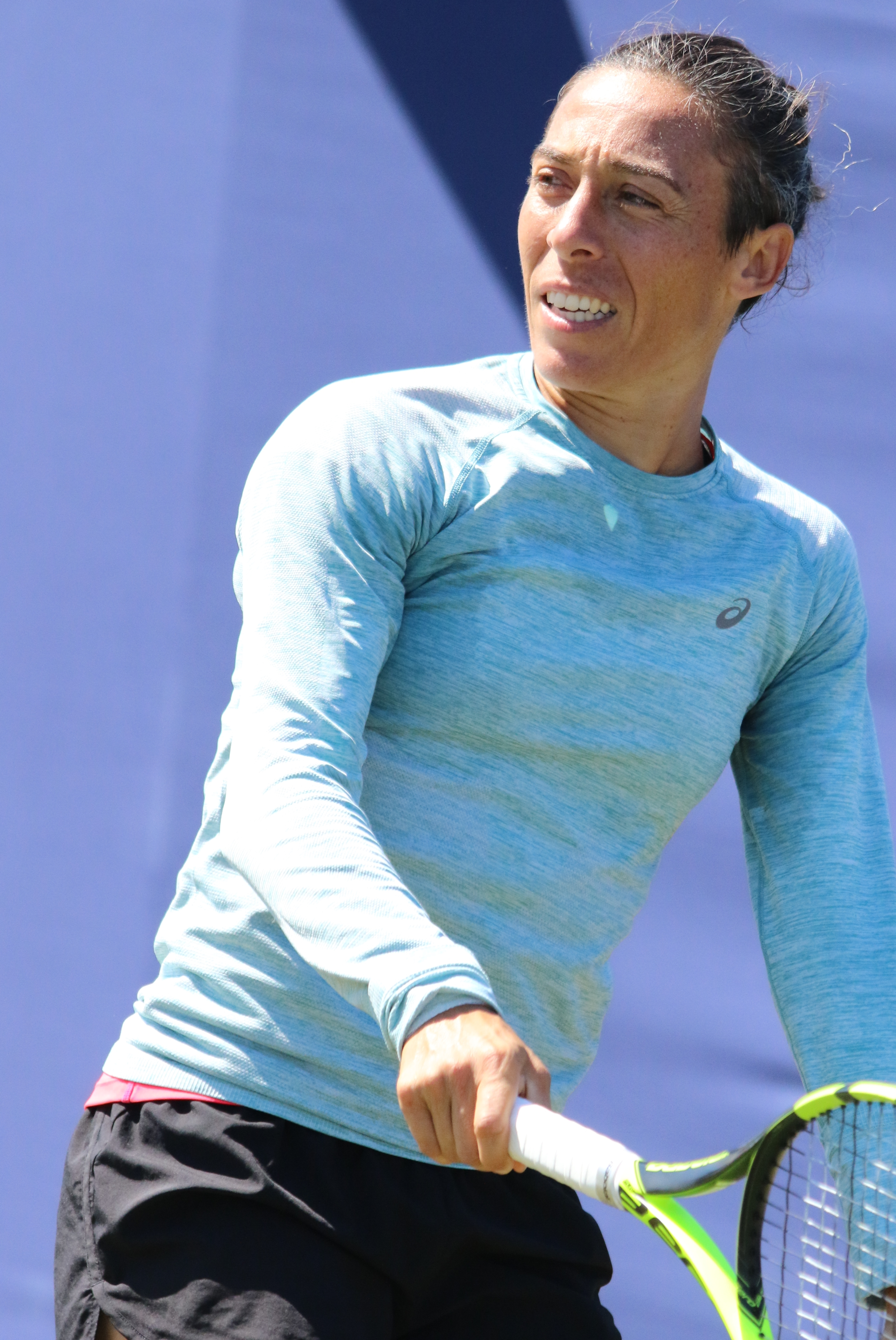
- Schiavone at the 2017 Aegon International Eastbourne
- Country (sports): Italy
- Residence: Milan, Italy
- Born: 23 June 1980 (age 46) Milan, Italy
- Height: 1.66 m (5 ft 5 in)
- Turned pro: 1998
- Retired: 2018
- Plays: Right (one-handed backhand)
- Prize money: $11,324,245
- Official website: schiavonefrancesca.com

Singles
- Career record: 614–479
- Career titles: 8
- Highest ranking: No. 4 (31 January 2011)

Grand Slam singles results
- Australian Open: QF (2011)
- French Open: W (2010)
- Wimbledon: QF (2009)
- US Open: QF (2003, 2010)

Other tournaments
- Tour Finals: RR (2010)
- Olympic Games: QF (2004)

Doubles
- Career record: 224–205
- Career titles: 7
- Highest ranking: No. 8 (12 February 2007)

Grand Slam doubles results
- Australian Open: SF (2009)
- French Open: F (2008)
- Wimbledon: SF (2012)
- US Open: SF (2006)

Other doubles tournaments
- Tour Finals: SF (2006)
- Olympic Games: QF (2008)

Team competitions
- Fed Cup: W (2006, 2009, 2010), record 27–22

Francesca Schiavone (Italian pronunciation: [franˈtʃeska skjaˈvoːne]; born 23 June 1980) is an Italian former professional tennis player. She had career-high rankings of world No. 4 in women's singles and No. 8 in women's doubles by the Women's Tennis Association (WTA). Schiavone won eight WTA Tour-level singles titles, achieved at least the quarter-finals in all four majors winning the 2010 French Open, becoming the first Italian woman to win a singles major. To date, Schiavone is the last one-handed backhand player to win a major women's title. Schiavone was also runner-up in singles at the 2011 French Open (failing to defend the title against Li Na), and in women's doubles at the 2008 French Open. She helped Italy win the Fed Cup in 2006, 2009 and 2010, and has the most match wins of any player for the Italian team. Schiavone played the longest ever women's singles match at a major, defeating Svetlana Kuznetsova 6–4, 1–6, 16–14 in the fourth round of the 2011 Australian Open after 4 hours and 44 minutes.

Schiavone announced her retirement from the sport at the 2018 US Open, and shared aspirations of winning a major as a coach. In April 2021, Schiavone began coaching Petra Martić.

== Professional career ==
Schiavone won eight singles titles and also achieved eleven runner-up positions, eight of them since the autumn of 2005. She lost her first eight career finals on the WTA Tour before finally winning her first title in July 2007. She and her Italian teammates Mara Santangelo, Flavia Pennetta and Roberta Vinci beat the Belgian team 3–2 in the 2006 Fed Cup final. Justine Henin had to retire in the fifth and final match due to an injury in her right knee, which let Italy win their first Fed Cup trophy. This match was a doubles match and Kirsten Flipkens partnered Henin, and Roberta Vinci partnered Schiavone. In 2009, she won the Fed Cup with Italy for the second time against the US, and also made the quarterfinals of Wimbledon for the first time. In 2010, Italy with Schiavone won the Fed Cup for the third time.

In addition, she realized a notable victory during the quarterfinals of the 2008 Dubai Open, when she upset world No. 1 and four-time champion Henin in two sets. She also beat Amélie Mauresmo in a Fed Cup tie in 2006 when Mauresmo was ranked No. 1.

Partnering with Australian Casey Dellacqua, Schiavone was the runner-up in the women's doubles competition at the 2008 French Open where they lost to Anabel Medina Garrigues and Virginia Ruano Pascual. Schiavone also reached the semifinals of the doubles event at the other three Grand Slam tournaments.

=== 2010: First major title at Roland Garros ===
At the Australian Open, Francesca defeated Frenchwomen Alizé Cornet, and Julie Coin first before upsetting No. 10 seed Agnieszka Radwańska in straight sets. Though she matched her best results there (round four), she went on to lose to No. 6 seed Venus Williams after winning the first set.

She beat Alberta Brianti, Tathiana Garbin, Carla Suárez Navarro, Yaroslava Shvedova, and Roberta Vinci all in straight sets to win her third WTA title at the Barcelona Ladies Open.

Seeded 17th entering the French Open, Schiavone was lightly regarded as a contender for the championship. She defeated Regina Kulikova, Sophie Ferguson, 11th seed Li Na, and 30th seed Maria Kirilenko to reach her first French Open quarterfinal since 2001 (where she had lost to Martina Hingis). There, she defeated world No. 3, Caroline Wozniacki, in straight sets to become the first Italian woman to reach the semifinals of a Grand Slam singles event.

The semifinals of the French Open consisted of four players (Jelena Janković, Elena Dementieva, Samantha Stosur and Schiavone) who had never won a Grand Slam singles event; nevertheless, most in the tennis community, including ESPN's tennis commentary team of Mary Joe Fernández, Patrick McEnroe, and Brad Gilbert singled out Schiavone as the one player who was not a serious contender to win the title. In the semifinals, Schiavone defeated world No. 5 and 2004 finalist, Dementieva (she retired in the second set with a torn calf muscle having lost the first set in a tiebreaker), and the victory made Schiavone the first Italian woman to reach a Grand Slam final, and assured that she would become a top-ten player for the first time following the tournament.

In the final, Schiavone faced Stosur in a rematch of their first-round meeting at the 2009 French Open which Stosur had won easily (6–4, 6–2). Because of this previous result, and Stosur's victories over four-time French Open champion Justine Henin, world No. 1 Serena Williams and world No. 4 Janković en route to the final, Stosur was considered a heavy favorite. However, on 5 June 2010, Schiavone defied expectations to become the first Italian woman to win a Grand Slam singles title, beating Stosur 6–4, 7–6. The victory made her only the third Italian player to win a Grand Slam event in singles, after Nicola Pietrangeli and Adriano Panatta. She also became the oldest woman to win a first Grand Slam title in the Open Era, beating the previous record by Jana Novotná. The victory also meant she rose to No. 6 in the world rankings on 7 June 2010 and became the highest-ranked Italian woman ever, after Flavia Pennetta reached world No. 10 in 2009.

Schiavone's next event was Eastbourne, where she lost in the first round to Sorana Cîrstea. As the fifth seed at Wimbledon, due to the pre-tournament withdrawal of Dementieva, she lost to Vera Dushevina in the first round in three sets.

Schiavone reached the quarterfinals of the Rogers Cup, where she fell to top seed Caroline Wozniacki. She was the sixth seed at the US Open, and defeated Ayumi Morita, Maria Elena Camerin, 29th seed Alona Bondarenko, and 20th seed Anastasia Pavlyuchenkova to advance to the quarterfinals for the first time since 2003 (where she had lost to Jennifer Capriati). In the quarterfinals, she fell to seven-time Grand Slam singles champion and No. 3 seed Venus Williams in two sets.

As the fifth seed, Schiavone reached the semifinals of the Pan Pacific Open, where she fell to seventh seed Elena Dementieva. At the season-ending Tour Championships, Schiavone competed for the first time in her career but was eliminated in the round-robin stage. She fell to Caroline Wozniacki in three sets, and Sam Stosur in two sets before defeating Elena Dementieva in what would be Dementieva's final career match.

=== 2011 ===
Schiavone began the year at the Hopman Cup representing Italy. In singles, she defeated Laura Robson, but fell to Bethanie Mattek-Sands. Schiavone retired with an injury against Kristina Mladenovic.

Seeded sixth at the Australian Open, Schiavone advanced to the quarterfinals for the first time in her career upon a victory over 23rd-seeded and two-time Grand Slam champion Svetlana Kuznetsova. The fourth-round encounter lasted nearly five hours (4:44; 47 games in total), and Schiavone saved six match points before finally prevailing 6–4, 1–6, 16–14. With this win, Schiavone rose in the rankings to world No. 4 after the tournament, the highest ranking ever achieved by an Italian woman, improving her own record. In the quarterfinal against world No. 1, Caroline Wozniacki, Schiavone was a set and 3–1 up in the second set, but was broken twice by Wozniacki in the same set and twice in the third, to lose 6–3, 3–6, 3–6 after saving three match points.

At the Dubai Tennis Championships, Schiavone was seeded third, but fell in the round of 16 to Kuznetsova. At the Qatar Open in Doha, she fell to Peng Shuai in the round of 16. She then fell to eventual champion Jelena Dokic at the Malaysian Open. Schiavone then reached the round of 16 again at the Indian Wells Open, falling to Shahar Pe'er. Seeded fifth at the Miami Open, she reached the round of 16, losing to Agnieszka Radwańska.

Schiavone began her clay-court season with a round of 16 loss to Radwańska at the Porsche Tennis Grand Prix. She then reached the round of 16 at the Madrid Open, falling to Mattek-Sands. Following Madrid, Schiavone reached the quarterfinals of the Italian Open, losing to world No. 7, Sam Stosur, in a rematch of the 2010 French Open final. She then lost to world No. 1, Caroline Wozniacki, in three sets during the semifinals of the Brussels Open, the last tournament before the French Open.

Schiavone was the fifth seed and defending champion at the French Open. She beat Melanie Oudin, Vesna Dolonts, 29th seed Peng Shuai, tenth seed Jelena Janković, 14th seed Anastasia Pavlyuchenkova, and 11th seed Marion Bartoli to reach the final where she lost to Li Na, 4–6, 6–7.

She then switched to the grass courts, falling to Agnieszka Radwańska at the Eastbourne International in her only Wimbledon warmup. She was the sixth seed at the Wimbledon Championships, losing in the third round to Tamira Paszek of Austria.

During the Canadian Open, Schiavone won her opening-round match against Ekaterina Makarova but fell in the third round to Lucie Šafářová.

The Western & Southern Open saw another early round loss for Schiavone. It took her three sets to defeat Maria Kirilenko in her opening round match. She then lost to former world No. 1, Jelena Janković, in a third round three-setter.

Just before the US Open Schiavone entered the New Haven Open. She defeated Alexandra Dulgheru and Monica Niculescu in the first two rounds. Her quarterfinal match against Anabel Medina Garrigues was a walkover. Schiavone was defeated by Wozniacki in straight sets in the semifinals.

At the US Open, she reached the fourth round where she lost to Anastasia Pavlyuchenkova. At the China Open Schiavone emerged victorious in the first round against Bojana Jovanovski but was then defeated in the second round by Dominika Cibulková.

=== 2012 ===
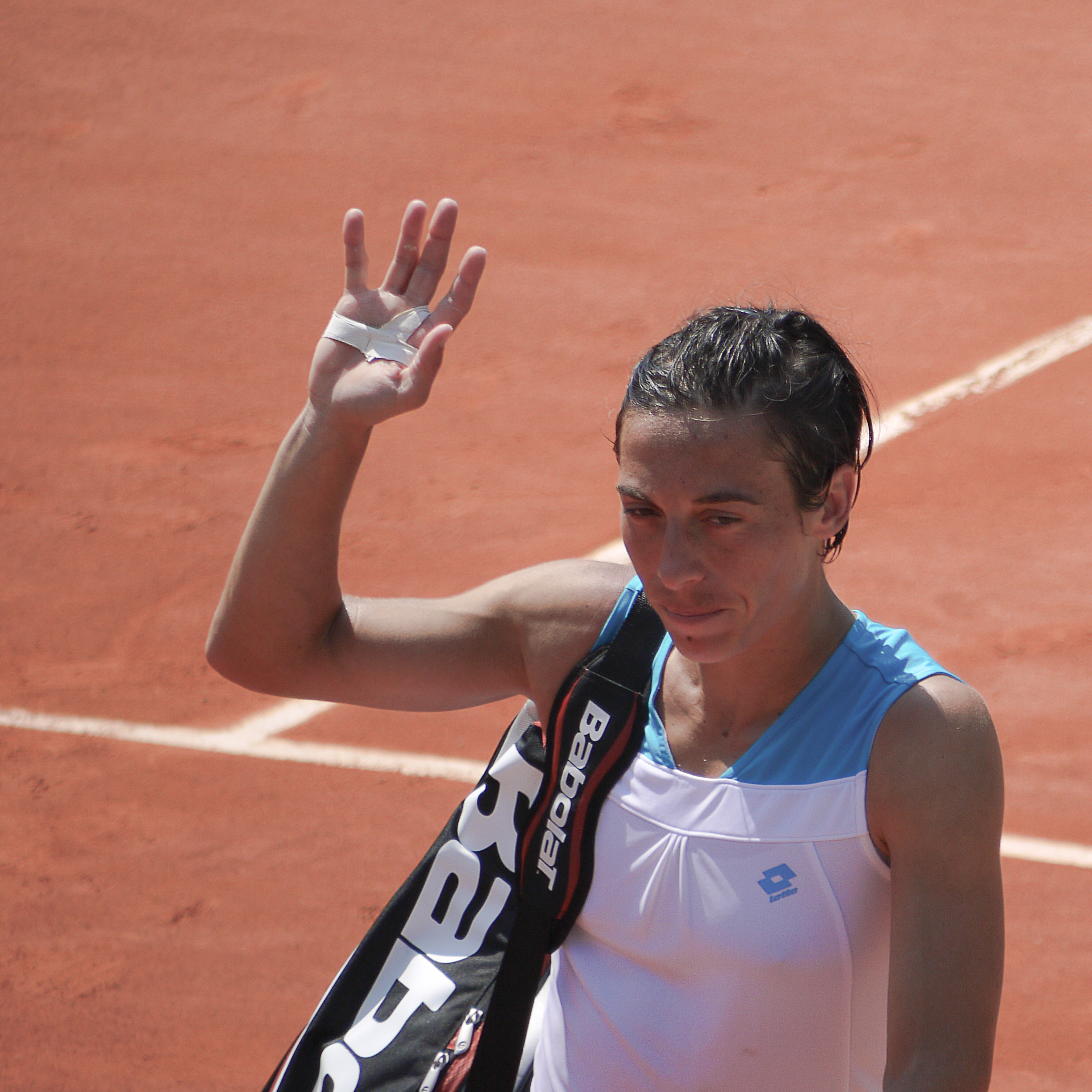
Schiavone at the 2012 French Open

Schiavone began the season at the Brisbane International. Seeded third, she reached the semifinal where she lost to eventual champion Kaia Kanepi.

Schiavone struggled whilst representing Italy at Fed Cup versus Ukraine, losing to a non-top-100 player Lesia Tsurenko comprehensively 1–6, 2–6 and barely getting past Kateryna Bondarenko, 6–7, 7–5, 6–4. Despite her struggles, Italy still managed to progress through to the semifinals.

Schiavone played in the mini gulf series in Doha and Dubai losing early in both of them as the seventh seed; Doha in the second round to Yanina Wickmayer 4–6, 6–7 and in her Dubai opener to Ana Ivanovic 1–6, 5–7.

At the Indian Wells Open, she (as 10th seed) avenged her Fed Cup loss by beating Lesia Tsurenko, 6–2, 6–4, before retiring against Lucie Šafářová in the third round after losing the first set 6–2. With the same seeding in Miami, she lost to Ksenia Pervak 4–6, 6–4, 5–7 in her opener, blowing a 3–0 final-set lead.

After lackluster results, the clay-court season was a chance for Schiavone to get back on form on her favorite surface, but as the top seed at the Barcelona Open, her poor form continued as she lost to Olga Govorstova in her opening match. She represented Italy in Fed Cup semifinals against Czech Republic, losing both of her matches to Lucie Šafářová and to Petra Kvitová. Italy lost the tie 1–4. After passing her opening round in Stuttgart against Monica Niculescu, she lost in the second round to No. 3 seed Petra Kvitová, in straight sets. She also lost her opener in Madrid to Varvara Lepchenko and Rome to Ekaterina Makarova. However, Schiavone finally found some form going into the French Open, winning Strasbourg by defeating Sloane Stephens and Alizé Cornet in the semifinals and finals, respectively.

Schiavone reached the third round of French Open, where she lost to Varvara Lepchenko.

At Wimbledon, she reached the fourth round, before losing to Petra Kvitová in three sets but managed to reach the semifinals in doubles with partner Flavia Pennetta. Schaivone won her opening match at the Olympics and was then ousted in the second round by Vera Zvonareva.

Seeded 22nd, Schiavone faced off against Sloane Stephens in the first round of the US Open and lost in straight sets. Schiavone then competed at the Pan Pacific Open where she defeated Yaroslava Shvedova in the first round but then lost to Sam Stosur. She then suffered three consecutive first-round losses to Li Na at Beijing, to Olga Puchkova at Osaka and to Urszula Radwańska at Moscow.

== Playing style ==
Schiavone employed an all-court game and has a very classic approach to her clay game. She used an extreme eastern grip on her one-handed backhand. Chris Fowler and Brad Gilbert described her forehand as a "buggy whip."

== Endorsements ==
Schiavone was endorsed by multiple companies throughout her professional career. From 2004, she was endorsed by Diadora for clothing and apparel, before switching to Lotto in 2007. She switched to Adidas in 2013; due to a series of poor results, she was dropped by the company, moving to Asics in 2014, remaining with Asics for the rest of her professional career. For racquets, Schiavone used Yonex racquets until 2006; in that year, she switched to Babolat, using the Pure Aero racquet until her retirement in 2018.

== Personal life ==
Schiavone was born in Milan, Lombardy, to Franco Schiavone (from Manocalzati in the Province of Avellino, Campania) and Luiscita Minelli (from Bornato in the Province of Brescia, Lombardy).

In late 2019, Schiavone revealed that she had been diagnosed with cancer in June of that year; after undergoing chemotherapy, she went into remission.

== Career statistics ==
=== Grand Slam tournament performance timelines ===
Key
W	F	SF	QF	#R	RR	Q#	DNQ	A	NH

(W) winner; (F) finalist; (SF) semifinalist; (QF) quarterfinalist; (#R) rounds 4, 3, 2, 1; (RR) round-robin stage; (Q#) qualification round; (DNQ) did not qualify; (A) absent; (NH) not held; (SR) strike rate (events won / competed); (W–L) win–loss record.

==== Singles ====
Tournament	1998	1999	2000	2001	2002	2003	2004	2005	2006	2007	2008	2009	2010	2011	2012	2013	2014	2015	2016	2017	2018	SR	W–L
Australian Open	A	A	A	1R	3R	1R	2R	3R	4R	2R	3R	1R	4R	QF	2R	1R	1R	1R	Q2	1R	1R	0 / 17	19–17
French Open	A	A	Q3	QF	3R	2R	4R	4R	4R	3R	3R	1R	W	F	3R	4R	1R	3R	1R	1R	1R	1 / 18	40–17
Wimbledon	A	A	Q1	2R	2R	3R	2R	1R	1R	2R	2R	QF	1R	3R	4R	1R	1R	1R	2R	2R	A	0 / 17	18–17
US Open	A	Q1	3R	1R	4R	QF	4R	3R	3R	2R	2R	4R	QF	4R	1R	1R	1R	1R	1R	1R	A	0 / 18	28–18
Win–loss	0–0	0–0	2–1	5–4	8–4	7–4	8–4	7–4	8–4	5–4	6–4	7–4	14–3	15–4	6–4	3–4	0–4	2–4	1–3	1–4	0–2	1 / 70	105–69

==== Doubles ====
Tournament	1998	1999	2000	2001	2002	2003	2004	2005	2006	2007	2008	2009	2010	2011	2012	2013	2014	2015	2016	2017	2018	SR	W–L
Australian Open	A	A	A	A	1R	A	1R	1R	3R	3R	1R	SF	QF	1R	1R	1R	A	A	A	A	1R	0 / 12	11–12
French Open	A	A	A	A	1R	A	QF	A	QF	3R	F	3R	2R	A	3R	3R	1R	2R	A	QF	A	0 / 12	24–12
Wimbledon	A	A	A	A	1R	1R	2R	1R	QF	1R	2R	2R	A	1R	SF	1R	1R	2R	A	1R	A	0 / 14	11–14
US Open	A	A	A	A	1R	2R	2R	1R	SF	1R	2R	2R	1R	2R	A	2R	1R	A	A	1R	A	0 / 13	10–13
Win–loss	0–0	0–0	0–0	0–0	0–4	1–2	5–4	0–3	12–4	4–4	7–4	8–4	4–3	1–3	6–3	3–4	0–3	2–2	0–0	3–3	0–1	0 / 51	56–51

=== Grand Slam finals ===
==== Singles: 2 (1 title, 1 runner-up) ====
Result	Year	Championship	Surface	Opponent	Score
Win	2010	French Open	Clay	(Australia) Samantha Stosur	6–4, 7–6^{(7–2)}
Loss	2011	French Open	Clay	(China) Li Na	4–6, 6–7^{(0–7)}

==== Doubles: 1 (runner-up) ====
Result	Year	Championship	Surface	partner	Opponents	Score
Loss	2008	French Open	Clay	(Australia) Casey Dellacqua	(Spain) Anabel Medina Garrigues (Spain) Virginia Ruano Pascual	6–2, 5–7, 4–6

Awards
Preceded by (Belgium) Yanina Wickmayer	WTA Most Improved Player; 2010	Succeeded by (Czech Republic) Petra Kvitová
Preceded by Federica Pellegrini	Italian Sportswoman of the Year; 2010	Succeeded by Federica Pellegrini
Preceded by (Belgium) Kim Clijsters	WTA Player Service; 2011	Succeeded by (United States) Venus Williams
