= 2010 Toray Pan Pacific Open =

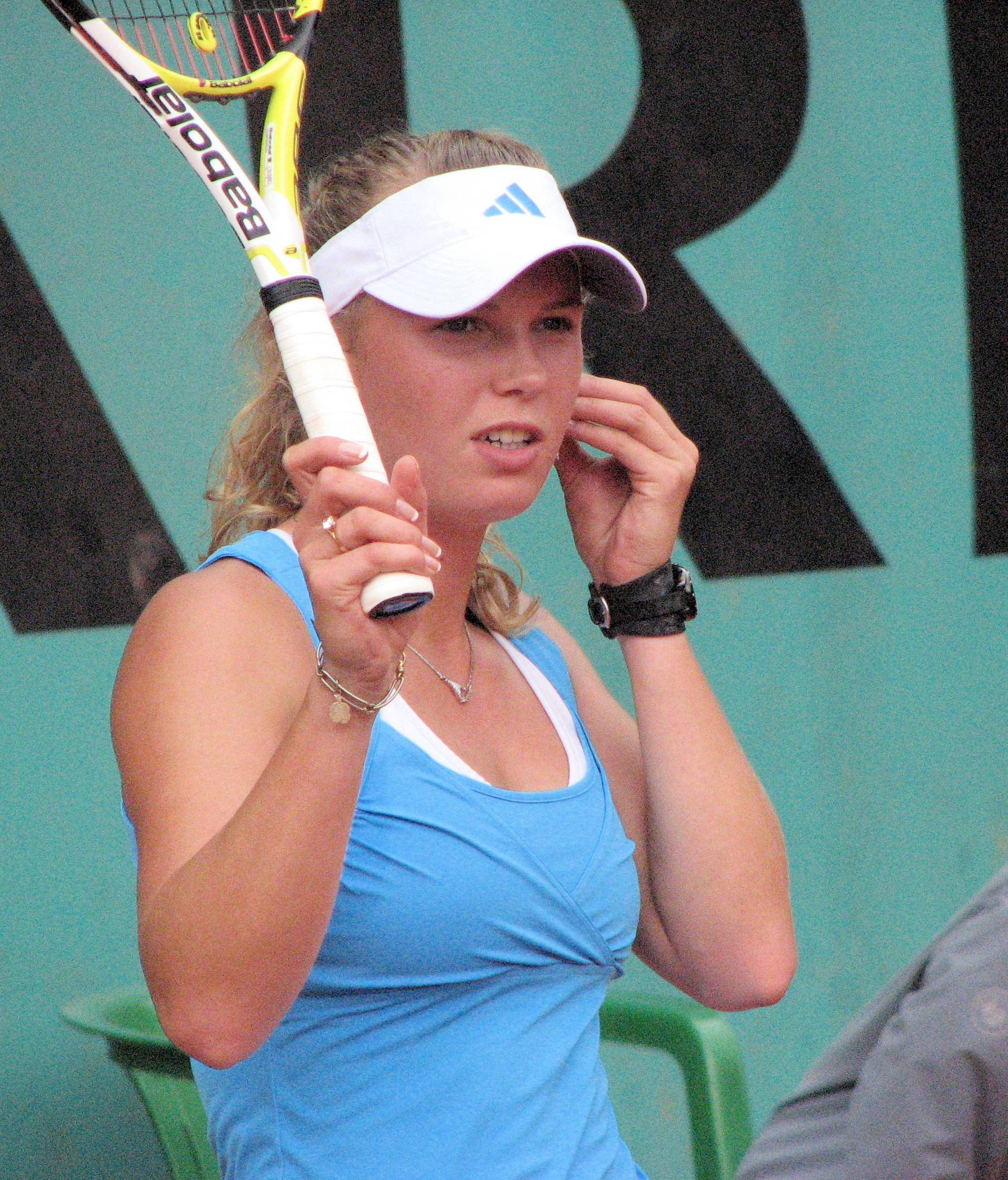
- Date: September 26 – October 2
- Edition: 27th
- Category: Premier 5
- Prize money: $2,000,000
- Surface: Hard / outdoor
- Location: Tokyo, Japan
- Venue: Ariake Coliseum

Champions

Singles
- (Denmark) Caroline Wozniacki

Doubles
- (Czech Republic) Iveta Benešová / (Czech Republic) Barbora Záhlavová-Strýcová
← 2009 ·	Pan Pacific Open	· 2011 →

The 2010 Toray Pan Pacific Open was women's tennis tournament played on the outdoor hard courts. It was the 27th edition of the Toray Pan Pacific Open, and was part of the Premier Series of the 2010 WTA Tour. It took place at the Ariake Coliseum in Tokyo, Japan, from September 26 to October 2, 2010. First-seeded Caroline Wozniacki won the singles title.

== Finals ==
=== Singles ===
(Denmark) Caroline Wozniacki defeated (Russia) Elena Dementieva, 1–6, 6–2, 6–3

- This is Wozniacki's fifth title of the year and 11th of her career.

=== Doubles ===
(Czech Republic) Iveta Benešová / (Czech Republic) Barbora Záhlavová-Strýcová defeated (Israel) Shahar Pe'er / (China) Peng Shuai, 6–4, 4–6, [10–8]

== WTA entrants ==
=== Seeds ===
Country	Player	Rank^{1}	Seed
DEN	Caroline Wozniacki	2	1
RUS	Vera Zvonareva	4	2
SRB	Jelena Janković	6	3
AUS	Samantha Stosur	7	4
ITA	Francesca Schiavone	8	5
POL	Agnieszka Radwańska	9	6
RUS	Elena Dementieva	10	7
BLR	Victoria Azarenka	11	8
~~CHN~~	~~Li Na~~	~~12~~	~~9~~
RUS	Svetlana Kuznetsova	13	10
FRA	Marion Bartoli	14	11
RUS	Maria Sharapova	15	12
ISR	Shahar Pe'er	17	13
FRA	Aravane Rezaï	18	14
RUS	Nadia Petrova	19	15
RUS	Anastasia Pavlyuchenkova	20	16

- Seeds are based on the rankings of September 20, 2010.

=== Other entrants ===
The following players received wildcards into the singles main draw:

- (Japan) Kimiko Date-Krumm
- (Japan) Ayumi Morita
- (Japan) Kurumi Nara

The following players received entry from the qualifying draw:

- (Hungary) Gréta Arn
- (Czech Republic) Iveta Benešová
- (Chinese Taipei) Chang Kai-chen
- (Russia) Ekaterina Makarova
- (United States) Christina McHale
- (United Kingdom) Laura Robson
- (United States) Coco Vandeweghe
- (Italy) Roberta Vinci

The following player received entry by a lucky loser spot:

- (Spain) María José Martínez Sánchez

=== Notable withdrawals ===
- (China) Li Na
- (United States) Serena Williams
- (China) Zheng Jie
