= 2010 WTA Tour =

Women's tennis circuit

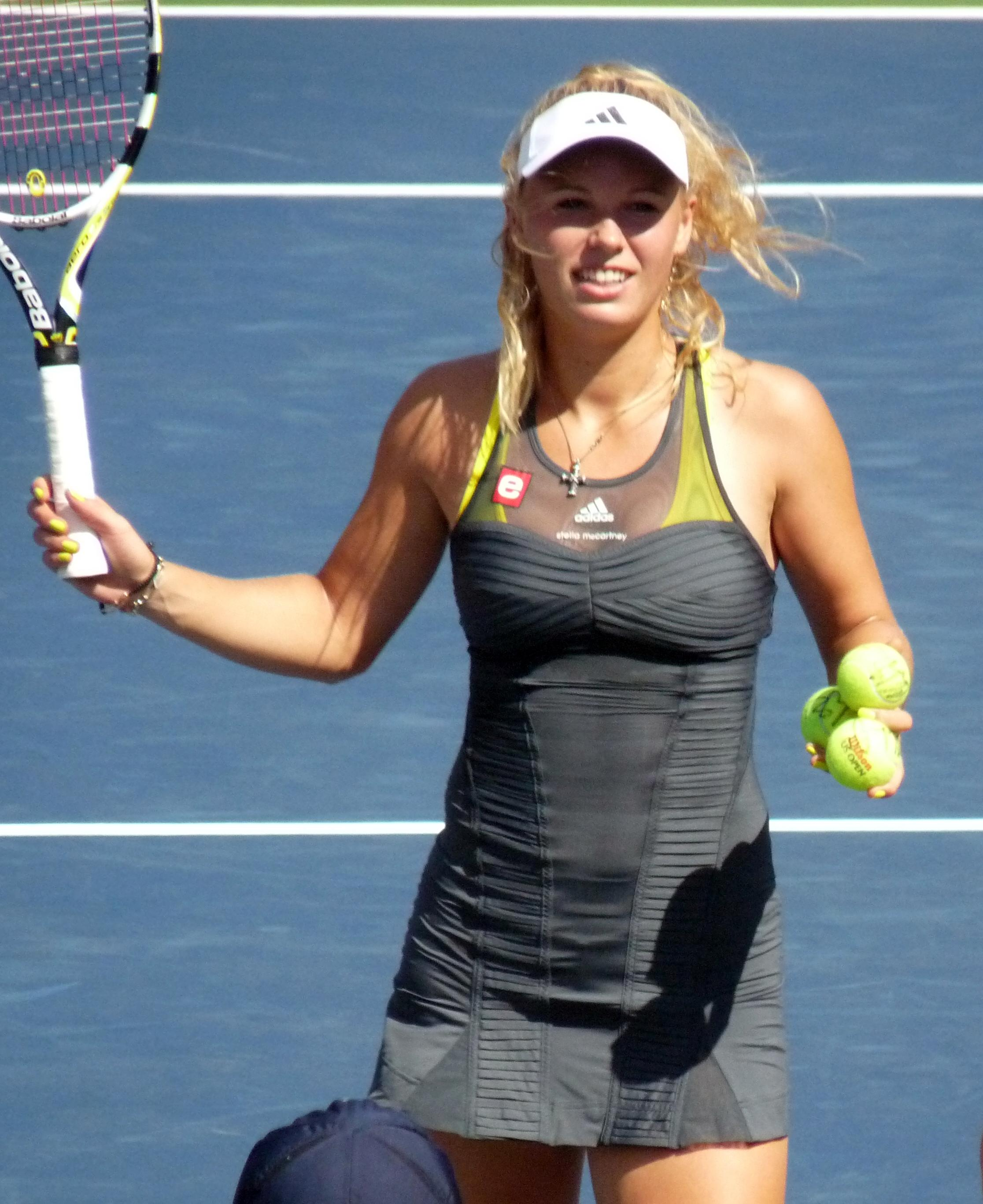
- Caroline Wozniacki finished the year as WTA world No. 1 for the first time in her career, though Kim Clijsters was named the Player of the Year. Wozniacki won six tournaments during the season, including three Premier Mandatory and Premier 5 events. Clijsters won five tournaments during the season, including a major at the US Open, the WTA Tour Championships, and two Premier Mandatory and Premier 5 events.

Details
- Duration: January 2 – November 7, 2010
- Edition: 40th
- Tournaments: 57
- Categories: Grand Slam (4); WTA Championships (2); WTA Premier Mandatory (4); WTA Premier 5 (5); WTA Premier (10); WTA International (32)

Achievements (singles)
- Most titles: (Denmark) Caroline Wozniacki (6)
- Most finals: (Denmark) Caroline Wozniacki (8)
- Prize money leader: (Belgium) Kim Clijsters (US$5,035,060)
- Points leader: (Denmark) Caroline Wozniacki (7,270)

Awards
- Player of the year: (Belgium) Kim Clijsters
- Doubles team of the year: (Argentina) Gisela Dulko (Italy) Flavia Pennetta
- Most improved player of the year: (Italy) Francesca Schiavone
- Newcomer of the year: (Czech Republic) Petra Kvitová
- Comeback player of the year: (Belgium) Justine Henin

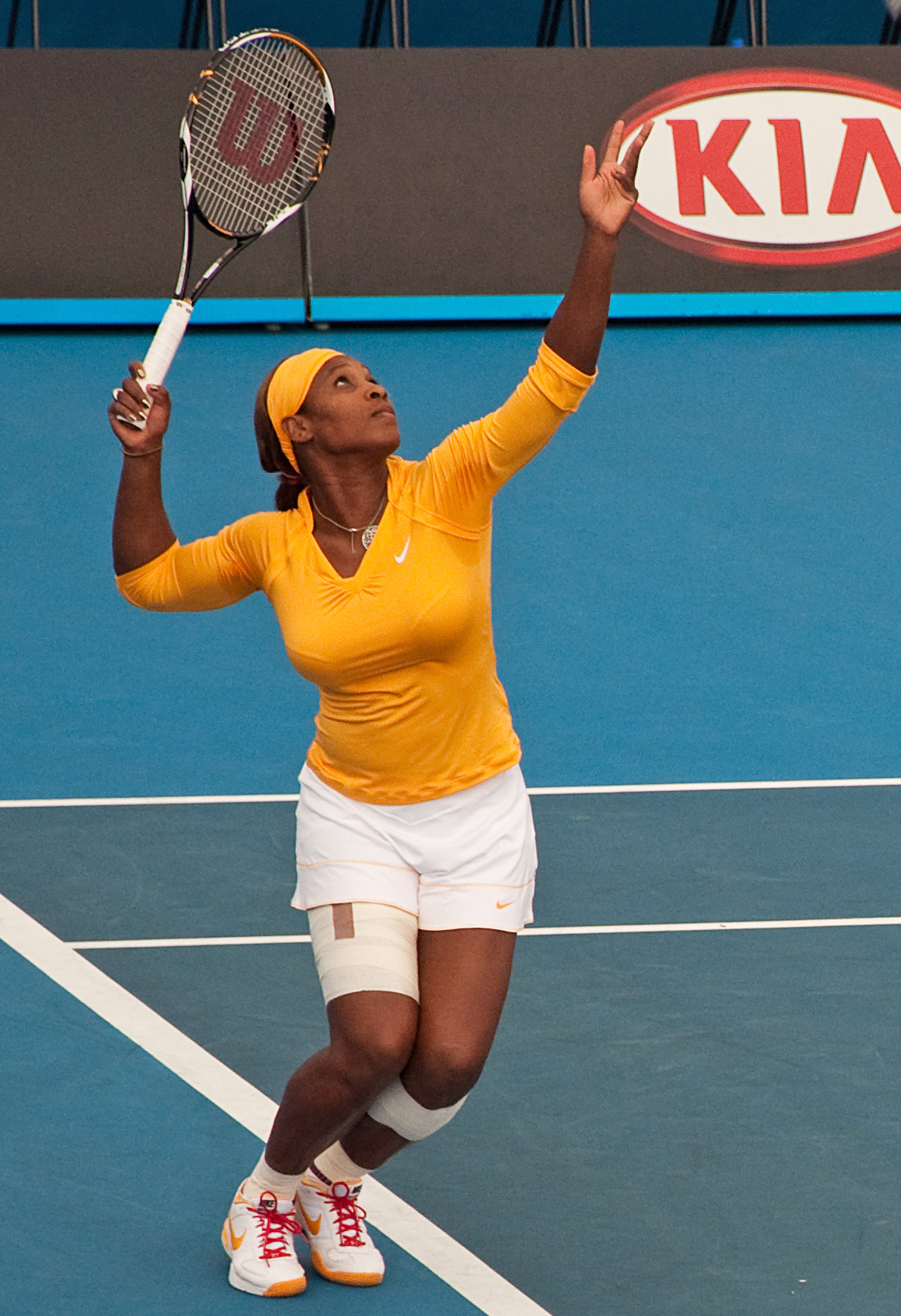
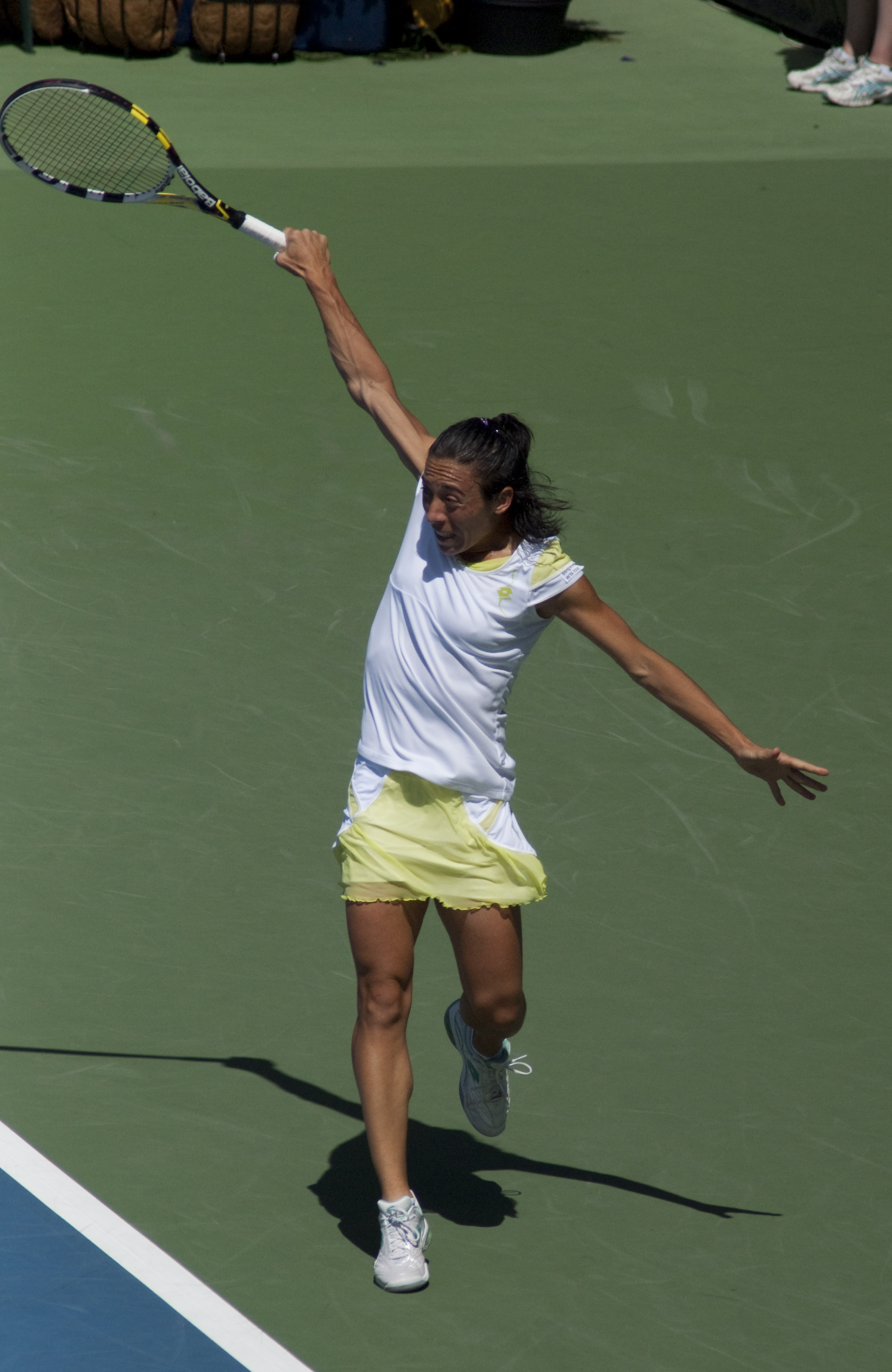
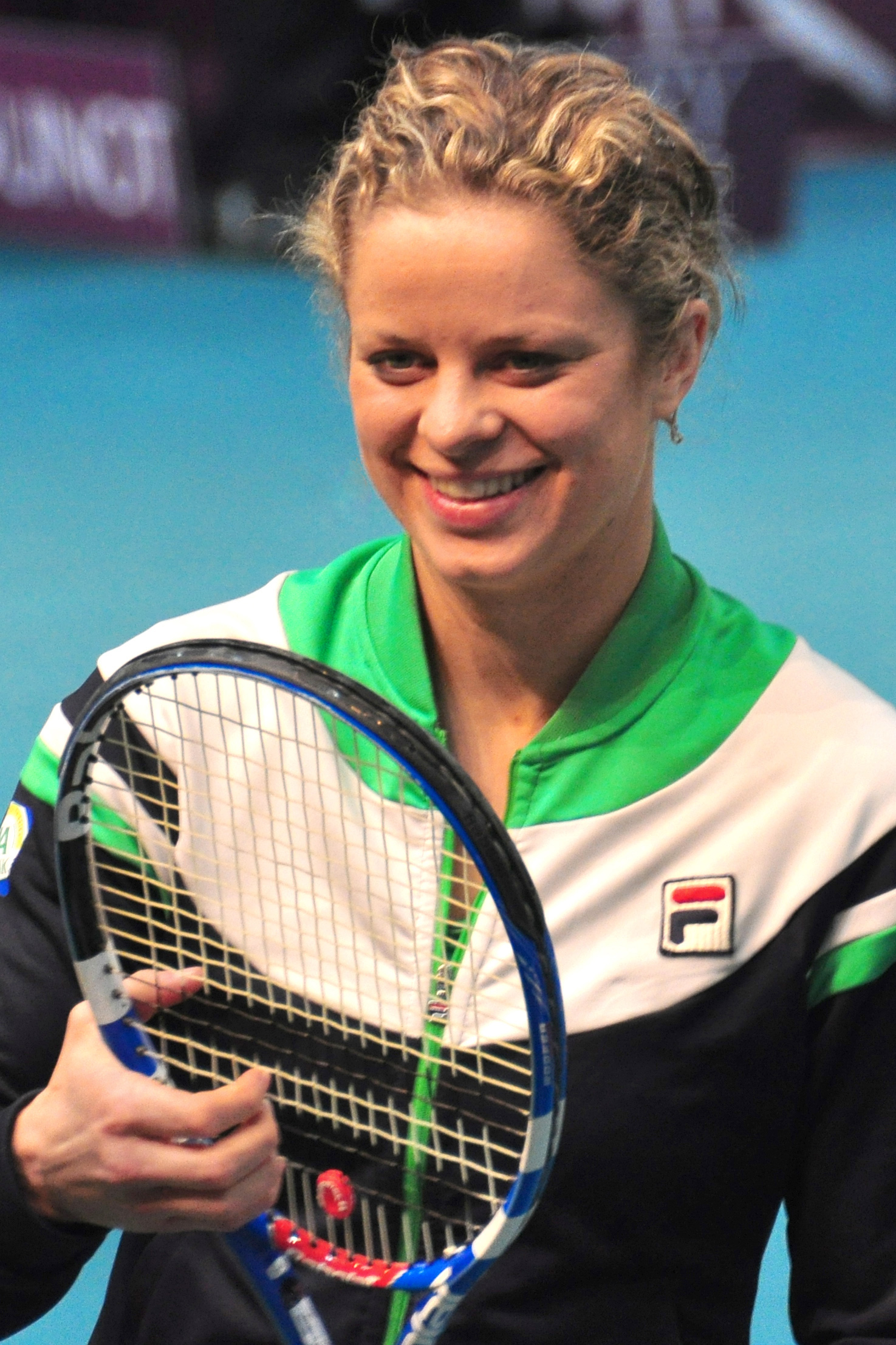
Serena Williams won her fifth Australian Open title, defeating former World No. 1, Justine Henin in the final. Williams went on to win her fourth Wimbledon title, defeating first-time finalist Vera Zvonareva. Francesca Schiavone claimed her maiden Grand Slam title at the French Open and becoming the first Italian player to win the Grand Slam. Kim Clijsters won her third US Open, defeating Zvonareva in the final.

The 2010 WTA Tour or 2010 Sony Ericsson WTA Tour (its sponsored name) calendar comprises the Grand Slam tournaments (supervised by the International Tennis Federation (ITF)), the WTA Premier tournaments (Premier Mandatory, Premier 5 and regular Premier), the WTA International tournaments, the Fed Cup (organized by the ITF), and the year-end championships (the Commonwealth Bank Tournament of Champions and the WTA Tour Championships). Also included in the 2010 calendar is the Hopman Cup, which does not distribute ranking points and is organized by the ITF.

== Notable stories ==
=== Serena Williams' season ===
Serena Williams began the season ranked World No. 1, having enjoyed an impressive 2009 season in which she won the Australian Open and Wimbledon (she would successfully defend both titles this year) and reclaimed the World No. 1 ranking on two occasions. Williams began her season by successfully defending her Australian Open title, defeating Justine Henin in a three-set final. She also successfully defended her Wimbledon title, defeating surprise finalist Vera Zvonareva in the final, 6–3, 6–2.

However, shortly after winning Wimbledon, Serena Williams would injure her foot at a German restaurant where she was celebrating her victory, but it didn't deter her from playing in an exhibition match against Kim Clijsters in front of a world-record tennis crowd that same week. The foot injury ended up being very serious enough to necessitate surgery, and as a result she missed the rest of the season and would not return to top-level tennis until June 2011. She was forced to miss her first US Open since 2003, and also had to withdraw from the year-end championships having qualified by virtue of winning Wimbledon. The injury worsened late in the year; despite accepting a wildcard into Linz, she had to withdraw from that tournament, with her wildcard entry later allocated to former World No. 1 Ana Ivanovic. Despite progress in her recovery from foot surgery, she lost the World No. 1 ranking to Danish youngster Caroline Wozniacki. Williams then announced her withdrawal from the 2011 Australian Open in November.

=== Justine Henin's comeback ===
Former World No. 1 Justine Henin announced her comeback to the WTA Tour in September last year, in the aftermath of fellow Belgian Kim Clijsters's victory at the 2009 US Open. She had previously not played at the highest level since suffering a third round defeat to Dinara Safina (who went on to make the final of the French Open that year) at the 2008 Qatar Telecom German Open. Henin's comeback began impressively, reaching the final of the 2010 Brisbane International in which she lost to her compatriot and rival Kim Clijsters in a final set tiebreak. She had defeated Nadia Petrova and Ana Ivanovic en route. She then reached the final of the Australian Open, in which she was defeated by Serena Williams in three sets, having defeated fifth seed Elena Dementieva in the second round, 27th seed Alisa Kleybanova in the third, qualifier Yanina Wickmayer in the fourth, 19th seed Nadia Petrova in the quarter-finals and Zheng Jie in the semi-finals en route.

She then participated at her first French Open since 2007, where she was defeated in the fourth round by eventual finalist Samantha Stosur, ending a 24-match winning streak at the tournament dating back to 2005. Prior to the defeat against Stosur, Henin had played her first three-set match at the tournament, also since 2005, when she defeated Maria Sharapova in the third round. Later, at Wimbledon, Henin again reached the fourth round, but suffered a three-set loss to rival Clijsters. During the match, she suffered an elbow injury which would later rule her out of the US Open, that same injury would lead to her second (and final) retirement in January 2011.

=== Ana Ivanovic's season ===
The first half of Ana Ivanovic's 2010 season appeared to follow on from her poor 2009 season, as her confidence and game continued to disintegrate since she won the 2008 French Open. She started the season ranked World No. 22 and spent almost the entire season ranked outside the Top 20. She was able to reach the semi-finals at the Brisbane International and the Rome Masters, but those would be her best results in the first half of the season, as she dropped out of the WTA's Top 50 for the first time since 2005 with a second round loss to rising Latvian Anastasija Sevastova at Indian Wells. On court results did not improve throughout the year, and Ivanovic dropped to a low of World No. 65 by July. Adding to a growing season of disappointment, Ivanovic also suffered the ignominy of winning the wooden spoon at Wimbledon, having finished at the end of the tournament's longest losing chain after losing in the first round.

However, Ivanovic would begin to turn her season around at the 2010 Western & Southern Financial Group Women's Open, entering the tournament having lost 17 of her last 29 matches dating back to August 2009 and having dropped to World No. 62. A first round upset win over recent Stanford champion Victoria Azarenka sparked a run to the semi-finals, where she was forced to retire against Kim Clijsters due to a foot injury; nevertheless, she re-entered the World's Top 40 following her run at Cincinnati. With no rankings points to defend for the remainder of the year, Ivanovic reached the fourth round of the US Open, the first time she had gotten that far at a Grand Slam tournament since Wimbledon in 2009. She defeated young Russian Ekaterina Makarova, Zheng Jie and Virginie Razzano before being crushed by defending and eventual champion Kim Clijsters in the fourth round.

Ivanovic continued to maintain her recent good form after the US Open; she was able to reach the quarter-finals in Beijing where she was defeated by Caroline Wozniacki, who eventually replaced Serena Williams as the new World No. 1 by winning the tournament. She then accepted a late wildcard entry into Linz after Williams withdrew due to her ongoing foot surgery, where she won her first title in two years after defeating Patty Schnyder, 6–2, 6–1, in the year's shortest final; the title returned Ivanovic to the world's Top 30, and qualified her for the 2010 Commonwealth Bank Tournament of Champions in Bali. In her final tournament of the year, she defeated Anastasia Pavlyuchenkova and Kimiko Date-Krumm en route to reaching her second final in three weeks, where she defeated Alisa Kleybanova to win her second title of the year and return to the world's Top 20 for the first time in more than one year. Ivanovic ended her season by winning 21 of her last 27 matches, having lost 17 of her last 29 beforehand.

== Schedule ==
This is the complete schedule of events on the 2010 calendar, with player progression documented from the quarterfinals stage.

Key

Grand Slam events
Year-end championships
WTA Premier Mandatory tournaments
WTA Premier 5 tournaments
WTA Premier tournaments
WTA International tournaments
Team events

=== January ===
Week	Tournament	Champions	Runners-up	Semifinalists	Quarterfinalists
Jan 4	Hopman Cup; Perth, Australia; Hopman Cup; Hard (i) – A$1,000,000 – 8 teams (RR)	Spain; 2–1	Great Britain	Round robin losers (Group A) Romania; United States; Australia	Round robin losers (Group B) Kazakhstan; Russia; Germany
Jan 4	Brisbane International; Brisbane, Australia; WTA International; Hard – $220,000 – 32S/32Q/16D; Singles – Doubles	(Belgium) Kim Clijsters; 6–3, 4–6, 7–6^{(8–6)}	(Belgium) Justine Henin	(Germany) Andrea Petkovic (Serbia) Ana Ivanovic	(Czech Republic) Lucie Šafářová (Slovakia) Daniela Hantuchová (Russia) Anastasia Pavlyuchenkova (Hungary) Melinda Czink
Jan 4	Brisbane International; Brisbane, Australia; WTA International; Hard – $220,000 – 32S/32Q/16D; Singles – Doubles	(Czech Republic) Andrea Hlaváčková (Czech Republic) Lucie Hradecká; 2–6, 7–6^{(7–3)}, [10–4]	(Hungary) Melinda Czink (Spain) Arantxa Parra Santonja	(Germany) Andrea Petkovic (Serbia) Ana Ivanovic	(Czech Republic) Lucie Šafářová (Slovakia) Daniela Hantuchová (Russia) Anastasia Pavlyuchenkova (Hungary) Melinda Czink
Jan 4	ASB Classic; Auckland, New Zealand; WTA International; Hard – $220,000 – 32S/32Q/16D; Singles – Doubles	(Belgium) Yanina Wickmayer; 6–3, 6–2	(Italy) Flavia Pennetta	(Italy) Francesca Schiavone (Israel) Shahar Pe'er	(Slovakia) Dominika Cibulková (France) Alizé Cornet (Japan) Kimiko Date-Krumm (Russia) Maria Kirilenko
Jan 4	ASB Classic; Auckland, New Zealand; WTA International; Hard – $220,000 – 32S/32Q/16D; Singles – Doubles	(Zimbabwe) Cara Black (United States) Liezel Huber; 7–6^{(7–4)}, 6–2	(South Africa) Natalie Grandin (United States) Laura Granville	(Italy) Francesca Schiavone (Israel) Shahar Pe'er	(Slovakia) Dominika Cibulková (France) Alizé Cornet (Japan) Kimiko Date-Krumm (Russia) Maria Kirilenko
Jan 11	Medibank International Sydney; Sydney, Australia; WTA Premier; Hard – $600,000 – 30S/32Q/16D; Singles – Doubles	(Russia) Elena Dementieva; 6–3, 6–2	(United States) Serena Williams	(France) Aravane Rezaï (Belarus) Victoria Azarenka	(Russia) Vera Dushevina (Italy) Flavia Pennetta (Slovakia) Dominika Cibulková (Russia) Dinara Safina
Jan 11	Medibank International Sydney; Sydney, Australia; WTA Premier; Hard – $600,000 – 30S/32Q/16D; Singles – Doubles	(Zimbabwe) Cara Black (United States) Liezel Huber; 6–1, 3–6, [10–3]	(Italy) Tathiana Garbin (Russia) Nadia Petrova	(France) Aravane Rezaï (Belarus) Victoria Azarenka	(Russia) Vera Dushevina (Italy) Flavia Pennetta (Slovakia) Dominika Cibulková (Russia) Dinara Safina
Jan 11	Moorilla Hobart International; Hobart, Australia; WTA International; Hard – $220,000 – 32S/32Q/16D; Singles – Doubles	(Ukraine) Alona Bondarenko; 6–2, 6–4	(Israel) Shahar Pe'er	(Spain) Anabel Medina Garrigues (Italy) Sara Errani	(Argentina) Gisela Dulko (China) Zheng Jie (Belgium) Kirsten Flipkens (Spain) Carla Suárez Navarro
Jan 11	Moorilla Hobart International; Hobart, Australia; WTA International; Hard – $220,000 – 32S/32Q/16D; Singles – Doubles	(Chinese Taipei) Chuang Chia-jung (Czech Republic) Květa Peschke; 3–6, 6–3, [10–7]	(Chinese Taipei) Chan Yung-jan (Romania) Monica Niculescu	(Spain) Anabel Medina Garrigues (Italy) Sara Errani	(Argentina) Gisela Dulko (China) Zheng Jie (Belgium) Kirsten Flipkens (Spain) Carla Suárez Navarro
Jan 18; Jan 25	Australian Open; Melbourne, Australia; Grand Slam; Hard – $9,264,098; 128S/96Q/64D/32X; Singles – Doubles – Mixed doubles	(United States) Serena Williams; 6–4, 3–6, 6–2	(Belgium) Justine Henin	(China) Li Na (China) Zheng Jie	(Belarus) Victoria Azarenka (United States) Venus Williams (Russia) Nadia Petrova (Russia) Maria Kirilenko
Jan 18; Jan 25	Australian Open; Melbourne, Australia; Grand Slam; Hard – $9,264,098; 128S/96Q/64D/32X; Singles – Doubles – Mixed doubles	(United States) Serena Williams (United States) Venus Williams; 6–4, 6–3	(Zimbabwe) Cara Black (United States) Liezel Huber	(China) Li Na (China) Zheng Jie	(Belarus) Victoria Azarenka (United States) Venus Williams (Russia) Nadia Petrova (Russia) Maria Kirilenko
Jan 18; Jan 25	Australian Open; Melbourne, Australia; Grand Slam; Hard – $9,264,098; 128S/96Q/64D/32X; Singles – Doubles – Mixed doubles	(Zimbabwe) Cara Black (India) Leander Paes; 7–5, 6–3	(Russia) Ekaterina Makarova (Czech Republic) Jaroslav Levinský	(China) Li Na (China) Zheng Jie	(Belarus) Victoria Azarenka (United States) Venus Williams (Russia) Nadia Petrova (Russia) Maria Kirilenko

=== February ===
Week	Tournament	Champions	Runners-up	Semifinalists	Quarterfinalists
Feb 1	Fed Cup first round Kharkiv, Ukraine – hard (i); Brno, Czech Republic – hard (i); Belgrade, Serbia – hard (i); Liévin, France – clay (red) (i)	First round winners Italy 4–1; Czech Republic 3–2; Russia 3–2; United States 4–1	First round losers Ukraine; Germany; Serbia; France		
Feb 8	Open GDF Suez; Paris, France; WTA Premier; Hard (i) – $700,000 – 30S/32Q/16D; Singles – Doubles	(Russia) Elena Dementieva; 6–7^{(5–7)}, 6–1, 6–4	(Czech Republic) Lucie Šafářová	(United States) Melanie Oudin (Italy) Flavia Pennetta	(Germany) Andrea Petkovic (Hungary) Ágnes Szávay (Israel) Shahar Pe'er (Italy) Tathiana Garbin
Feb 8	Open GDF Suez; Paris, France; WTA Premier; Hard (i) – $700,000 – 30S/32Q/16D; Singles – Doubles	(Czech Republic) Iveta Benešová (Czech Republic) Barbora Záhlavová-Strýcová walkover	(Zimbabwe) Cara Black (United States) Liezel Huber	(United States) Melanie Oudin (Italy) Flavia Pennetta	(Germany) Andrea Petkovic (Hungary) Ágnes Szávay (Israel) Shahar Pe'er (Italy) Tathiana Garbin
Feb 8	PTT Pattaya Open; Pattaya, Thailand; WTA International; Hard – $220,000 – 32S/16Q/16D; Singles – Doubles	(Russia) Vera Zvonareva; 6–4, 6–4	(Thailand) Tamarine Tanasugarn	(Kazakhstan) Yaroslava Shvedova (Kazakhstan) Sesil Karatantcheva	(Austria) Sybille Bammer (Germany) Tatjana Malek (Russia) Ekaterina Bychkova (Russia) Anna Chakvetadze
Feb 8	PTT Pattaya Open; Pattaya, Thailand; WTA International; Hard – $220,000 – 32S/16Q/16D; Singles – Doubles	(New Zealand) Marina Erakovic (Thailand) Tamarine Tanasugarn; 7–5, 6–1	(Russia) Anna Chakvetadze (Russia) Ksenia Pervak	(Kazakhstan) Yaroslava Shvedova (Kazakhstan) Sesil Karatantcheva	(Austria) Sybille Bammer (Germany) Tatjana Malek (Russia) Ekaterina Bychkova (Russia) Anna Chakvetadze
Feb 15	Barclays Dubai Tennis Championships; Dubai, United Arab Emirates; WTA Premier 5 Hard – $2,000,000 – 56S/32Q/28D; Singles – Doubles	(United States) Venus Williams; 6–3, 7–5	(Belarus) Victoria Azarenka	(Israel) Shahar Pe'er (Poland) Agnieszka Radwańska	(China) Li Na (Russia) Anastasia Pavlyuchenkova (Russia) Vera Zvonareva (Russia) Regina Kulikova
Feb 15	Barclays Dubai Tennis Championships; Dubai, United Arab Emirates; WTA Premier 5 Hard – $2,000,000 – 56S/32Q/28D; Singles – Doubles	(Spain) Nuria Llagostera Vives (Spain) María José Martínez Sánchez; 7–6^{(7–5)}, 6–4	(Czech Republic) Květa Peschke (Slovenia) Katarina Srebotnik	(Israel) Shahar Pe'er (Poland) Agnieszka Radwańska	(China) Li Na (Russia) Anastasia Pavlyuchenkova (Russia) Vera Zvonareva (Russia) Regina Kulikova
Feb 15	Cellular South Cup; Memphis, United States; WTA International; Hard (i) – $220,000 – 32S/32Q/16D; Singles – Doubles	(Russia) Maria Sharapova; 6–2, 6–1	(Sweden) Sofia Arvidsson	(Czech Republic) Petra Kvitová (United Kingdom) Anne Keothavong	(United Kingdom) Elena Baltacha (Estonia) Kaia Kanepi (Croatia) Karolina Šprem (United States) Melanie Oudin
Feb 15	Cellular South Cup; Memphis, United States; WTA International; Hard (i) – $220,000 – 32S/32Q/16D; Singles – Doubles	(United States) Vania King (Netherlands) Michaëlla Krajicek; 7–5, 6–2	(United States) Bethanie Mattek-Sands (United States) Meghann Shaughnessy	(Czech Republic) Petra Kvitová (United Kingdom) Anne Keothavong	(United Kingdom) Elena Baltacha (Estonia) Kaia Kanepi (Croatia) Karolina Šprem (United States) Melanie Oudin
Feb 15	Copa BBVA-Colsanitas; Bogotá, Colombia; WTA International; Clay (red) – $220,000 – 32S/32Q/16D; Singles – Doubles	(Colombia) Mariana Duque Mariño; 6–4, 6–3	(Germany) Angelique Kerber	(Argentina) Gisela Dulko (Spain) Arantxa Parra Santonja	(Czech Republic) Sandra Záhlavová (France) Pauline Parmentier (Italy) Sara Errani (Czech Republic) Klára Zakopalová
Feb 15	Copa BBVA-Colsanitas; Bogotá, Colombia; WTA International; Clay (red) – $220,000 – 32S/32Q/16D; Singles – Doubles	(Argentina) Gisela Dulko (Romania) Edina Gallovits; 6–2, 7–6^{(8–6)}	(Ukraine) Olga Savchuk (Belarus) Anastasiya Yakimova	(Argentina) Gisela Dulko (Spain) Arantxa Parra Santonja	(Czech Republic) Sandra Záhlavová (France) Pauline Parmentier (Italy) Sara Errani (Czech Republic) Klára Zakopalová
Feb 22	Abierto Mexicano Telcel; Acapulco, Mexico; WTA International; Clay (red) – $220,000 – 32S/32Q/16D; Singles – Doubles	(United States) Venus Williams; 2–6, 6–2, 6–3	(Slovenia) Polona Hercog	(Romania) Edina Gallovits (Spain) Carla Suárez Navarro	(Spain) Laura Pous Tió (Canada) Sharon Fichman (Argentina) Gisela Dulko (Hungary) Ágnes Szávay
Feb 22	Abierto Mexicano Telcel; Acapulco, Mexico; WTA International; Clay (red) – $220,000 – 32S/32Q/16D; Singles – Doubles	(Slovenia) Polona Hercog (Czech Republic) Barbora Záhlavová-Strýcová; 2–6, 6–1, [10–2]	(Italy) Sara Errani (Italy) Roberta Vinci	(Romania) Edina Gallovits (Spain) Carla Suárez Navarro	(Spain) Laura Pous Tió (Canada) Sharon Fichman (Argentina) Gisela Dulko (Hungary) Ágnes Szávay
Feb 22	Malaysian Open; Kuala Lumpur, Malaysia; WTA International; Hard – $220,000 – 32S/32Q/16D; Singles – Doubles	(Russia) Alisa Kleybanova; 6–3, 6–2	(Russia) Elena Dementieva	(Austria) Sybille Bammer (Japan) Ayumi Morita	(Slovakia) Magdaléna Rybáriková (Chinese Taipei) Chang Kai-chen (Australia) Anastasia Rodionova (South Africa) Chanelle Scheepers
Feb 22	Malaysian Open; Kuala Lumpur, Malaysia; WTA International; Hard – $220,000 – 32S/32Q/16D; Singles – Doubles	(Chinese Taipei) Chan Yung-jan (China) Zheng Jie; 6–7^{(4–7)}, 6–2, [10–7]	(Australia) Anastasia Rodionova (Russia) Arina Rodionova	(Austria) Sybille Bammer (Japan) Ayumi Morita	(Slovakia) Magdaléna Rybáriková (Chinese Taipei) Chang Kai-chen (Australia) Anastasia Rodionova (South Africa) Chanelle Scheepers

=== March ===
Week	Tournament	Champions	Runners-up	Semifinalists	Quarterfinalists
Mar 1	Monterrey Open; Monterrey, Mexico; WTA International; Hard – $220,000 – 32S/32Q/16D; Singles – Doubles	(Russia) Anastasia Pavlyuchenkova; 1–6, 6–1, 6–0	(Slovakia) Daniela Hantuchová	(Latvia) Anastasija Sevastova (Slovakia) Dominika Cibulková	(France) Alizé Cornet (Czech Republic) Klára Zakopalová (Hungary) Ágnes Szávay (United States) Vania King
Mar 1	Monterrey Open; Monterrey, Mexico; WTA International; Hard – $220,000 – 32S/32Q/16D; Singles – Doubles	(Czech Republic) Iveta Benešová (Czech Republic) Barbora Záhlavová-Strýcová; 3–6, 6–4, [10–8]	(Germany) Anna-Lena Grönefeld (United States) Vania King	(Latvia) Anastasija Sevastova (Slovakia) Dominika Cibulková	(France) Alizé Cornet (Czech Republic) Klára Zakopalová (Hungary) Ágnes Szávay (United States) Vania King
Mar 8 Mar 15	BNP Paribas Open; Indian Wells, United States; WTA Premier Mandatory; Hard – $4,500,000 – 96S/48Q/32D; Singles – Doubles	(Serbia) Jelena Janković; 6–2, 6–4	(Denmark) Caroline Wozniacki	(Australia) Samantha Stosur (Poland) Agnieszka Radwańska	(Russia) Alisa Kleybanova (Spain) María José Martínez Sánchez (Russia) Elena Dementieva (China) Zheng Jie
Mar 8 Mar 15	BNP Paribas Open; Indian Wells, United States; WTA Premier Mandatory; Hard – $4,500,000 – 96S/48Q/32D; Singles – Doubles	(Czech Republic) Květa Peschke (Slovenia) Katarina Srebotnik; 6–4, 2–6, 10–5	(Russia) Nadia Petrova (Australia) Samantha Stosur	(Australia) Samantha Stosur (Poland) Agnieszka Radwańska	(Russia) Alisa Kleybanova (Spain) María José Martínez Sánchez (Russia) Elena Dementieva (China) Zheng Jie
Mar 22; Mar 29	Sony Ericsson Open; Key Biscayne, United States; WTA Premier Mandatory; Hard – $4,500,000 – 96S/48Q/32D; Singles – Doubles	(Belgium) Kim Clijsters; 6–2, 6–1	(United States) Venus Williams	(France) Marion Bartoli (Belgium) Justine Henin	(Belgium) Yanina Wickmayer (Poland) Agnieszka Radwańska (Australia) Samantha Stosur (Denmark) Caroline Wozniacki
Mar 22; Mar 29	Sony Ericsson Open; Key Biscayne, United States; WTA Premier Mandatory; Hard – $4,500,000 – 96S/48Q/32D; Singles – Doubles	(Argentina) Gisela Dulko (Italy) Flavia Pennetta; 6–3, 4–6, 10–7	(Russia) Nadia Petrova (Australia) Samantha Stosur	(France) Marion Bartoli (Belgium) Justine Henin	(Belgium) Yanina Wickmayer (Poland) Agnieszka Radwańska (Australia) Samantha Stosur (Denmark) Caroline Wozniacki

=== April ===
Week	Tournament	Champions	Runners-up	Semifinalists	Quarterfinalists
Apr 5	MPS Group Championships; Ponte Vedra Beach, United States; WTA International; Clay – $220,000 (green) – 32S/32Q/16D; Singles – Doubles	(Denmark) Caroline Wozniacki; 6–2, 7–5	(Belarus) Olga Govortsova	(Russia) Elena Vesnina (Slovakia) Dominika Cibulková	(Russia) Anastasia Pavlyuchenkova (United States) Melanie Oudin (Canada) Aleksandra Wozniak (United States) Varvara Lepchenko
Apr 5	MPS Group Championships; Ponte Vedra Beach, United States; WTA International; Clay – $220,000 (green) – 32S/32Q/16D; Singles – Doubles	(United States) Bethanie Mattek-Sands (China) Yan Zi; 4–6, 6–4, [10–8]	(Chinese Taipei) Chuang Chia-jung (China) Peng Shuai	(Russia) Elena Vesnina (Slovakia) Dominika Cibulková	(Russia) Anastasia Pavlyuchenkova (United States) Melanie Oudin (Canada) Aleksandra Wozniak (United States) Varvara Lepchenko
Apr 5	Andalucia Tennis Experience; Marbella, Spain; WTA International; Clay (red) – $220,000 – 32S/32Q/16D; Singles – Doubles	(Italy) Flavia Pennetta; 6–2, 4–6, 6–3	(Spain) Carla Suárez Navarro	(Spain) María José Martínez Sánchez (Italy) Sara Errani	(Belarus) Victoria Azarenka (Germany) Tatjana Malek (Spain) Beatriz García Vidagany (Romania) Simona Halep
Apr 5	Andalucia Tennis Experience; Marbella, Spain; WTA International; Clay (red) – $220,000 – 32S/32Q/16D; Singles – Doubles	(Italy) Sara Errani (Italy) Roberta Vinci; 6–4, 6–2	(Russia) Maria Kondratieva (Kazakhstan) Yaroslava Shvedova	(Spain) María José Martínez Sánchez (Italy) Sara Errani	(Belarus) Victoria Azarenka (Germany) Tatjana Malek (Spain) Beatriz García Vidagany (Romania) Simona Halep
Apr 12	Family Circle Cup; Charleston, United States; WTA Premier; Clay – $700,000 (green) – 56S/32Q/16D; Singles – Doubles	(Australia) Samantha Stosur; 6–0, 6–3	(Russia) Vera Zvonareva	(Denmark) Caroline Wozniacki (Slovakia) Daniela Hantuchová	(Russia) Nadia Petrova (United States) Melanie Oudin (China) Peng Shuai (Serbia) Jelena Janković
Apr 12	Family Circle Cup; Charleston, United States; WTA Premier; Clay – $700,000 (green) – 56S/32Q/16D; Singles – Doubles	(United States) Liezel Huber (Russia) Nadia Petrova; 6–3, 6–4	(United States) Vania King (Netherlands) Michaëlla Krajicek	(Denmark) Caroline Wozniacki (Slovakia) Daniela Hantuchová	(Russia) Nadia Petrova (United States) Melanie Oudin (China) Peng Shuai (Serbia) Jelena Janković
Apr 12	Barcelona Ladies Open; Barcelona, Spain; WTA International; Clay (red) – $220,000 – 32S/32Q/16D; Singles – Doubles	(Italy) Francesca Schiavone; 6–1, 6–1	(Italy) Roberta Vinci	(Kazakhstan) Yaroslava Shvedova (Romania) Alexandra Dulgheru	(Spain) Carla Suárez Navarro (Czech Republic) Iveta Benešová (Spain) Arantxa Parra Santonja (Switzerland) Timea Bacsinszky
Apr 12	Barcelona Ladies Open; Barcelona, Spain; WTA International; Clay (red) – $220,000 – 32S/32Q/16D; Singles – Doubles	(Italy) Sara Errani (Italy) Roberta Vinci; 6–1, 3–6, [10–2]	(Switzerland) Timea Bacsinszky (Italy) Tathiana Garbin	(Kazakhstan) Yaroslava Shvedova (Romania) Alexandra Dulgheru	(Spain) Carla Suárez Navarro (Czech Republic) Iveta Benešová (Spain) Arantxa Parra Santonja (Switzerland) Timea Bacsinszky
Apr 19	Fed Cup Semifinals; Rome, Italy – clay (red); Birmingham, United States – hard (i)	Semifinals winners Italy 5–0; United States 3–2	Semifinals losers Czech Republic; Russia		
Apr 26	Porsche Tennis Grand Prix; Stuttgart, Germany; WTA Premier; Clay (red) (i) – $700,000 – 32S/32Q/16D; Singles – Doubles	(Belgium) Justine Henin; 6–4, 2–6, 6–1	(Australia) Samantha Stosur	(Russia) Anna Lapushchenkova (Israel) Shahar Pe'er	(Czech Republic) Lucie Šafářová (China) Li Na (Serbia) Jelena Janković (Russia) Dinara Safina
Apr 26	Porsche Tennis Grand Prix; Stuttgart, Germany; WTA Premier; Clay (red) (i) – $700,000 – 32S/32Q/16D; Singles – Doubles	(Argentina) Gisela Dulko (Italy) Flavia Pennetta; 3–6, 7–6^{(7–3)}, [10–5]	(Czech Republic) Květa Peschke (Slovenia) Katarina Srebotnik	(Russia) Anna Lapushchenkova (Israel) Shahar Pe'er	(Czech Republic) Lucie Šafářová (China) Li Na (Serbia) Jelena Janković (Russia) Dinara Safina
Apr 26	Grand Prix SAR La Princesse Lalla Meryem; Fez, Morocco; WTA International; Clay (red) – $220,000 – 32S/32Q/16D; Singles – Doubles	(Czech Republic) Iveta Benešová; 6–4, 6–2	(Romania) Simona Halep	(France) Alizé Cornet (Czech Republic) Renata Voráčová	(United Kingdom) Anne Keothavong (Spain) Laura Pous Tió (Germany) Angelique Kerber (Switzerland) Patty Schnyder
Apr 26	Grand Prix SAR La Princesse Lalla Meryem; Fez, Morocco; WTA International; Clay (red) – $220,000 – 32S/32Q/16D; Singles – Doubles	(Czech Republic) Iveta Benešová (Spain) Anabel Medina Garrigues; 6–3, 6–1	(Czech Republic) Lucie Hradecká (Czech Republic) Renata Voráčová	(France) Alizé Cornet (Czech Republic) Renata Voráčová	(United Kingdom) Anne Keothavong (Spain) Laura Pous Tió (Germany) Angelique Kerber (Switzerland) Patty Schnyder

=== May ===
Week	Tournament	Champions	Runners-up	Semifinalists	Quarterfinalists
May 3	Internazionali BNL d'Italia; Rome, Italy; WTA Premier 5 Clay (red) – $2,000,000 – 56S/32Q/28D; Singles – Doubles	(Spain) María José Martínez Sánchez; 7–6^{(7–5)}, 7–5	(Serbia) Jelena Janković	(United States) Serena Williams (Serbia) Ana Ivanovic	(Russia) Maria Kirilenko (United States) Venus Williams (Russia) Nadia Petrova (Czech Republic) Lucie Šafářová
May 3	Internazionali BNL d'Italia; Rome, Italy; WTA Premier 5 Clay (red) – $2,000,000 – 56S/32Q/28D; Singles – Doubles	(Argentina) Gisela Dulko (Italy) Flavia Pennetta; 6–4, 6–2	(Spain) Nuria Llagostera Vives (Spain) María José Martínez Sánchez	(United States) Serena Williams (Serbia) Ana Ivanovic	(Russia) Maria Kirilenko (United States) Venus Williams (Russia) Nadia Petrova (Czech Republic) Lucie Šafářová
May 3	Estoril Open; Oeiras, Portugal; WTA International; Clay (red) – $220,000 – 32S/32Q/16D; Singles – Doubles	(Latvia) Anastasija Sevastova; 6–2, 7–5	(Spain) Arantxa Parra Santonja	(China) Peng Shuai (Romania) Sorana Cîrstea	(Australia) Anastasia Rodionova (Spain) Anabel Medina Garrigues (Australia) Jarmila Groth (Netherlands) Arantxa Rus
May 3	Estoril Open; Oeiras, Portugal; WTA International; Clay (red) – $220,000 – 32S/32Q/16D; Singles – Doubles	(Romania) Sorana Cîrstea (Spain) Anabel Medina Garrigues; 6–1, 7–5	(Russia) Vitalia Diatchenko (France) Aurélie Védy	(China) Peng Shuai (Romania) Sorana Cîrstea	(Australia) Anastasia Rodionova (Spain) Anabel Medina Garrigues (Australia) Jarmila Groth (Netherlands) Arantxa Rus
May 10	Mutua Madrileña Madrid Open; Madrid, Spain; WTA Premier Mandatory; Clay (red) – $4,500,000 – 60S/32Q/28D; Singles – Doubles	(France) Aravane Rezaï; 6–2, 7–5	(United States) Venus Williams	(Czech Republic) Lucie Šafářová (Israel) Shahar Pe'er	(Russia) Nadia Petrova (Serbia) Jelena Janković (Australia) Samantha Stosur (China) Li Na
May 10	Mutua Madrileña Madrid Open; Madrid, Spain; WTA Premier Mandatory; Clay (red) – $4,500,000 – 60S/32Q/28D; Singles – Doubles	(United States) Serena Williams (United States) Venus Williams; 6–2, 7–5	(Argentina) Gisela Dulko (Italy) Flavia Pennetta	(Czech Republic) Lucie Šafářová (Israel) Shahar Pe'er	(Russia) Nadia Petrova (Serbia) Jelena Janković (Australia) Samantha Stosur (China) Li Na
May 17	Polsat Warsaw Open; Warsaw, Poland; WTA Premier; Clay (red) – $600,000 – 32S/32Q/16D; Singles – Doubles	(Romania) Alexandra Dulgheru; 6–3, 6–4	(China) Zheng Jie	(Hungary) Gréta Arn (China) Li Na	(Denmark) Caroline Wozniacki (Ukraine) Alona Bondarenko (Italy) Sara Errani (Bulgaria) Tsvetana Pironkova
May 17	Polsat Warsaw Open; Warsaw, Poland; WTA Premier; Clay (red) – $600,000 – 32S/32Q/16D; Singles – Doubles	(Spain) Virginia Ruano Pascual (United States) Meghann Shaughnessy; 6–3, 6–4	(Zimbabwe) Cara Black (China) Yan Zi	(Hungary) Gréta Arn (China) Li Na	(Denmark) Caroline Wozniacki (Ukraine) Alona Bondarenko (Italy) Sara Errani (Bulgaria) Tsvetana Pironkova
May 17	Internationaux de Strasbourg; Strasbourg, France; WTA International; Clay (red) – $220,000 – 32S/30Q/16D; Singles – Doubles	(Russia) Maria Sharapova; 7–5, 6–1	(Germany) Kristina Barrois	(Spain) Anabel Medina Garrigues (United States) Vania King	(Germany) Julia Görges (Sweden) Sofia Arvidsson (Latvia) Anastasija Sevastova (Australia) Anastasia Rodionova
May 17	Internationaux de Strasbourg; Strasbourg, France; WTA International; Clay (red) – $220,000 – 32S/30Q/16D; Singles – Doubles	(France) Alizé Cornet (United States) Vania King; 3–6, 6–4, [10–7]	(Russia) Alla Kudryavtseva (Australia) Anastasia Rodionova	(Spain) Anabel Medina Garrigues (United States) Vania King	(Germany) Julia Görges (Sweden) Sofia Arvidsson (Latvia) Anastasija Sevastova (Australia) Anastasia Rodionova
May 24; May 31	French Open; Paris, France; Grand Slam; Clay (red) – $9,938,926 – 128S/96Q/64D/32X; Singles – Doubles – Mixed doubles	(Italy) Francesca Schiavone; 6–4, 7–6^{(7–2)}	(Australia) Samantha Stosur	(Serbia) Jelena Janković (Russia) Elena Dementieva	(United States) Serena Williams (Kazakhstan) Yaroslava Shvedova (Denmark) Caroline Wozniacki (Russia) Nadia Petrova
May 24; May 31	French Open; Paris, France; Grand Slam; Clay (red) – $9,938,926 – 128S/96Q/64D/32X; Singles – Doubles – Mixed doubles	(United States) Serena Williams (United States) Venus Williams; 6–2, 6–3	(Czech Republic) Květa Peschke (Slovenia) Katarina Srebotnik	(Serbia) Jelena Janković (Russia) Elena Dementieva	(United States) Serena Williams (Kazakhstan) Yaroslava Shvedova (Denmark) Caroline Wozniacki (Russia) Nadia Petrova
May 24; May 31	French Open; Paris, France; Grand Slam; Clay (red) – $9,938,926 – 128S/96Q/64D/32X; Singles – Doubles – Mixed doubles	(Slovenia) Katarina Srebotnik (Serbia) Nenad Zimonjić; 4–6, 7–6^{(7–5)}, [11–9]	(Kazakhstan) Yaroslava Shvedova (Austria) Julian Knowle	(Serbia) Jelena Janković (Russia) Elena Dementieva	(United States) Serena Williams (Kazakhstan) Yaroslava Shvedova (Denmark) Caroline Wozniacki (Russia) Nadia Petrova

=== June ===
Week	Tournament	Champions	Runners-up	Semifinalists	Quarterfinalists
Jun 7	Aegon Classic; Birmingham, Great Britain; WTA International; Grass – $220,000 – 56S/32Q/16D; Singles – Doubles	(China) Li Na; 7–5, 6–1	(Russia) Maria Sharapova	(France) Aravane Rezaï (United States) Alison Riske	(Estonia) Kaia Kanepi (Italy) Sara Errani (Belgium) Yanina Wickmayer (Kazakhstan) Sesil Karatantcheva
Jun 7	Aegon Classic; Birmingham, Great Britain; WTA International; Grass – $220,000 – 56S/32Q/16D; Singles – Doubles	(Zimbabwe) Cara Black (United States) Lisa Raymond; 6–3, 3–2 retired	(United States) Liezel Huber (United States) Bethanie Mattek-Sands	(France) Aravane Rezaï (United States) Alison Riske	(Estonia) Kaia Kanepi (Italy) Sara Errani (Belgium) Yanina Wickmayer (Kazakhstan) Sesil Karatantcheva
Jun 14	Aegon International; Eastbourne, Great Britain; WTA Premier; Grass – $600,000 – 32S/32Q/16D; Singles – Doubles	(Russia) Ekaterina Makarova; 7–6^{(7–5)}, 6–4	(Belarus) Victoria Azarenka	(France) Marion Bartoli (Australia) Samantha Stosur	(Spain) María José Martínez Sánchez (Belgium) Kim Clijsters (United Kingdom) Elena Baltacha (Russia) Svetlana Kuznetsova
Jun 14	Aegon International; Eastbourne, Great Britain; WTA Premier; Grass – $600,000 – 32S/32Q/16D; Singles – Doubles	(United States) Lisa Raymond (Australia) Rennae Stubbs; 6–2, 2–6, 13–11	(Czech Republic) Květa Peschke (Slovenia) Katarina Srebotnik	(France) Marion Bartoli (Australia) Samantha Stosur	(Spain) María José Martínez Sánchez (Belgium) Kim Clijsters (United Kingdom) Elena Baltacha (Russia) Svetlana Kuznetsova
Jun 14	UNICEF Open 's-Hertogenbosch, Netherlands; WTA International; Grass – $220,000 – 32S/16Q/16D; Singles – Doubles	(Belgium) Justine Henin; 3–6, 6–3, 6–4	(Germany) Andrea Petkovic	(Romania) Alexandra Dulgheru (Belgium) Kirsten Flipkens	(Germany) Kristina Barrois (Kazakhstan) Yaroslava Shvedova (Slovakia) Dominika Cibulková (Czech Republic) Sandra Záhlavová
Jun 14	UNICEF Open 's-Hertogenbosch, Netherlands; WTA International; Grass – $220,000 – 32S/16Q/16D; Singles – Doubles	(Russia) Alla Kudryavtseva (Australia) Anastasia Rodionova; 3–6, 6–3, 10–8	(United States) Vania King (Kazakhstan) Yaroslava Shvedova	(Romania) Alexandra Dulgheru (Belgium) Kirsten Flipkens	(Germany) Kristina Barrois (Kazakhstan) Yaroslava Shvedova (Slovakia) Dominika Cibulková (Czech Republic) Sandra Záhlavová
Jun 21; Jun 28	The Championships, Wimbledon; London, Great Britain; Grand Slam; Grass – $9,781,631; 128S/96Q/64D/48X; Singles – Doubles – Mixed doubles	(United States) Serena Williams; 6–3, 6–2	(Russia) Vera Zvonareva	(Czech Republic) Petra Kvitová (Bulgaria) Tsvetana Pironkova	(China) Li Na (Estonia) Kaia Kanepi (Belgium) Kim Clijsters (United States) Venus Williams
Jun 21; Jun 28	The Championships, Wimbledon; London, Great Britain; Grand Slam; Grass – $9,781,631; 128S/96Q/64D/48X; Singles – Doubles – Mixed doubles	(United States) Vania King (Kazakhstan) Yaroslava Shvedova; 7–6^{(8–6)}, 6–2	(Russia) Elena Vesnina (Russia) Vera Zvonareva	(Czech Republic) Petra Kvitová (Bulgaria) Tsvetana Pironkova	(China) Li Na (Estonia) Kaia Kanepi (Belgium) Kim Clijsters (United States) Venus Williams
Jun 21; Jun 28	The Championships, Wimbledon; London, Great Britain; Grand Slam; Grass – $9,781,631; 128S/96Q/64D/48X; Singles – Doubles – Mixed doubles	(Zimbabwe) Cara Black (India) Leander Paes; 6–4, 7–6^{(7–5)}	(United States) Lisa Raymond (South Africa) Wesley Moodie	(Czech Republic) Petra Kvitová (Bulgaria) Tsvetana Pironkova	(China) Li Na (Estonia) Kaia Kanepi (Belgium) Kim Clijsters (United States) Venus Williams

=== July ===
Week	Tournament	Champions	Runners-up	Semifinalists	Quarterfinalists
Jul 5	GDF Suez Grand Prix; Budapest, Hungary; WTA International; Clay (red) – $220,000 – 32S/32Q/16D; Singles – Doubles	(Hungary) Ágnes Szávay; 6–2, 6–4	(Switzerland) Patty Schnyder	(Czech Republic) Zuzana Ondrášková (Romania) Alexandra Dulgheru	(Slovenia) Polona Hercog (Spain) Anabel Medina Garrigues (France) Alizé Cornet (Latvia) Anastasija Sevastova
Jul 5	GDF Suez Grand Prix; Budapest, Hungary; WTA International; Clay (red) – $220,000 – 32S/32Q/16D; Singles – Doubles	(Switzerland) Timea Bacsinszky (Italy) Tathiana Garbin; 6–3, 6–3	(Romania) Sorana Cîrstea (Spain) Anabel Medina Garrigues	(Czech Republic) Zuzana Ondrášková (Romania) Alexandra Dulgheru	(Slovenia) Polona Hercog (Spain) Anabel Medina Garrigues (France) Alizé Cornet (Latvia) Anastasija Sevastova
Jul 5	Collector Swedish Open; Båstad, Sweden; WTA International; Clay (red) – $220,000 – 32S/32Q/16D; Singles – Doubles	(France) Aravane Rezaï; 6–3, 4–6, 6–4	(Argentina) Gisela Dulko	(Italy) Flavia Pennetta (Czech Republic) Lucie Šafářová	(United States) Jill Craybas (Croatia) Ana Vrljić (Czech Republic) Barbora Záhlavová-Strýcová (Spain) Arantxa Parra Santonja
Jul 5	Collector Swedish Open; Båstad, Sweden; WTA International; Clay (red) – $220,000 – 32S/32Q/16D; Singles – Doubles	(Argentina) Gisela Dulko (Italy) Flavia Pennetta; 7–6^{(7–0)}, 6–0	(Czech Republic) Renata Voráčová (Czech Republic) Barbora Záhlavová-Strýcová	(Italy) Flavia Pennetta (Czech Republic) Lucie Šafářová	(United States) Jill Craybas (Croatia) Ana Vrljić (Czech Republic) Barbora Záhlavová-Strýcová (Spain) Arantxa Parra Santonja
Jul 12	Internazionali Femminili di Palermo; Palermo, Italy; WTA International; Clay (red) – $220,000 – 32S/32Q/16D; Singles – Doubles	(Estonia) Kaia Kanepi; 6–4, 6–3	(Italy) Flavia Pennetta	(Germany) Julia Görges (Italy) Romina Oprandi	(Spain) Nuria Llagostera Vives (United States) Jill Craybas (Italy) Sara Errani (France) Aravane Rezaï
Jul 12	Internazionali Femminili di Palermo; Palermo, Italy; WTA International; Clay (red) – $220,000 – 32S/32Q/16D; Singles – Doubles	(Italy) Alberta Brianti (Italy) Sara Errani; 6–4, 6–1	(United States) Jill Craybas (Germany) Julia Görges	(Germany) Julia Görges (Italy) Romina Oprandi	(Spain) Nuria Llagostera Vives (United States) Jill Craybas (Italy) Sara Errani (France) Aravane Rezaï
Jul 12	ECM Prague Open; Prague, Czech Republic; WTA International; Clay (red) – $220,000 – 32S/32Q/16D; Singles – Doubles	(Hungary) Ágnes Szávay; 6–2, 1–6, 6–2	(Czech Republic) Barbora Záhlavová-Strýcová	(Switzerland) Patty Schnyder (Czech Republic) Lucie Hradecká	(Sweden) Johanna Larsson (Georgia (country)) Anna Tatishvili (Spain) Anabel Medina Garrigues (Slovenia) Polona Hercog
Jul 12	ECM Prague Open; Prague, Czech Republic; WTA International; Clay (red) – $220,000 – 32S/32Q/16D; Singles – Doubles	(Switzerland) Timea Bacsinszky (Italy) Tathiana Garbin; 7–5, 7–6^{(7–4)}	(Romania) Monica Niculescu (Hungary) Ágnes Szávay	(Switzerland) Patty Schnyder (Czech Republic) Lucie Hradecká	(Sweden) Johanna Larsson (Georgia (country)) Anna Tatishvili (Spain) Anabel Medina Garrigues (Slovenia) Polona Hercog
Jul 19	Banka Koper Slovenia Open; Portorož, Slovenia; WTA International; Hard – $220,000 – 32S/32Q/16D; Singles – Doubles	(Russia) Anna Chakvetadze; 6–1, 6–2	(Sweden) Johanna Larsson	(Russia) Ksenia Pervak (Slovenia) Polona Hercog	(Belarus) Anastasiya Yakimova (Russia) Anastasia Pavlyuchenkova (Russia) Vera Dushevina (Switzerland) Stefanie Vögele
Jul 19	Banka Koper Slovenia Open; Portorož, Slovenia; WTA International; Hard – $220,000 – 32S/32Q/16D; Singles – Doubles	(Russia) Maria Kondratieva (Czech Republic) Vladimíra Uhlířová; 6–4, 2–6, [10–7]	(Russia) Anna Chakvetadze (New Zealand) Marina Erakovic	(Russia) Ksenia Pervak (Slovenia) Polona Hercog	(Belarus) Anastasiya Yakimova (Russia) Anastasia Pavlyuchenkova (Russia) Vera Dushevina (Switzerland) Stefanie Vögele
Jul 19	NÜRNBERGER Gastein Ladies; Bad Gastein, Austria; WTA International; Clay (red) – $220,000 – 32S/32Q/16D; Singles – Doubles	(Germany) Julia Görges; 6–1, 6–4	(Switzerland) Timea Bacsinszky	(France) Alizé Cornet (Austria) Yvonne Meusburger	(Austria) Patricia Mayr (Russia) Anastasia Pivovarova (Latvia) Anastasija Sevastova (Czech Republic) Sandra Záhlavová
Jul 19	NÜRNBERGER Gastein Ladies; Bad Gastein, Austria; WTA International; Clay (red) – $220,000 – 32S/32Q/16D; Singles – Doubles	(Czech Republic) Lucie Hradecká (Spain) Anabel Medina Garrigues; 6–7^{(2–7)}, 6–1, [10–5]	(Switzerland) Timea Bacsinszky (Italy) Tathiana Garbin	(France) Alizé Cornet (Austria) Yvonne Meusburger	(Austria) Patricia Mayr (Russia) Anastasia Pivovarova (Latvia) Anastasija Sevastova (Czech Republic) Sandra Záhlavová
Jul 26	Bank of the West Classic; Stanford, United States; WTA Premier; Hard – $700,000 – 30S/32Q/16D; Singles – Doubles	(Belarus) Victoria Azarenka; 6–4, 6–1	(Russia) Maria Sharapova	(Australia) Samantha Stosur (Poland) Agnieszka Radwańska	(Belgium) Yanina Wickmayer (France) Marion Bartoli (Russia) Maria Kirilenko (Russia) Elena Dementieva
Jul 26	Bank of the West Classic; Stanford, United States; WTA Premier; Hard – $700,000 – 30S/32Q/16D; Singles – Doubles	(United States) Lindsay Davenport (United States) Liezel Huber; 7–5, 6–7^{(8–10)}, [10–8]	(Chinese Taipei) Chan Yung-jan (China) Zheng Jie	(Australia) Samantha Stosur (Poland) Agnieszka Radwańska	(Belgium) Yanina Wickmayer (France) Marion Bartoli (Russia) Maria Kirilenko (Russia) Elena Dementieva
Jul 26	İstanbul Cup; Istanbul, Turkey; WTA International; Hard – $220,000 – 32S/32Q/16D; Singles – Doubles	(Russia) Anastasia Pavlyuchenkova; 5–7, 7–5, 6–4	(Russia) Elena Vesnina	(Germany) Andrea Petkovic (Australia) Jarmila Groth	(United Kingdom) Elena Baltacha (Australia) Anastasia Rodionova (Romania) Sorana Cîrstea (Russia) Vera Dushevina
Jul 26	İstanbul Cup; Istanbul, Turkey; WTA International; Hard – $220,000 – 32S/32Q/16D; Singles – Doubles	(Greece) Eleni Daniilidou (Germany) Jasmin Wöhr; 6–4, 1–6, [11–9]	(Russia) Maria Kondratieva (Czech Republic) Vladimíra Uhlířová	(Germany) Andrea Petkovic (Australia) Jarmila Groth	(United Kingdom) Elena Baltacha (Australia) Anastasia Rodionova (Romania) Sorana Cîrstea (Russia) Vera Dushevina

=== August ===
Week	Tournament	Champions	Runners-up	Semifinalists	Quarterfinalists
Aug 2	Mercury Insurance Open; San Diego, United States; WTA Premier; Hard – $700,000 – 30S/32Q/16D; Singles – Doubles	(Russia) Svetlana Kuznetsova; 6–4, 6–7^{(7–9)}, 6–3	(Poland) Agnieszka Radwańska	(Slovakia) Daniela Hantuchová (Italy) Flavia Pennetta	(Russia) Alisa Kleybanova (Israel) Shahar Pe'er (United States) CoCo Vandeweghe (Australia) Samantha Stosur
Aug 2	Mercury Insurance Open; San Diego, United States; WTA Premier; Hard – $700,000 – 30S/32Q/16D; Singles – Doubles	(Russia) Maria Kirilenko (China) Zheng Jie; 6–4, 6–4	(United States) Lisa Raymond (Australia) Rennae Stubbs	(Slovakia) Daniela Hantuchová (Italy) Flavia Pennetta	(Russia) Alisa Kleybanova (Israel) Shahar Pe'er (United States) CoCo Vandeweghe (Australia) Samantha Stosur
Aug 2	e-Boks Sony Ericsson Open; Copenhagen, Denmark; WTA International; Hard (i) – $220,000 – 32S/32Q/16D; Singles – Doubles	(Denmark) Caroline Wozniacki; 6–2, 7–6^{(7–5)}	(Czech Republic) Klára Zakopalová	(Russia) Anna Chakvetadze (China) Li Na	(Germany) Julia Görges (Slovenia) Polona Hercog (Romania) Sorana Cîrstea (Germany) Angelique Kerber
Aug 2	e-Boks Sony Ericsson Open; Copenhagen, Denmark; WTA International; Hard (i) – $220,000 – 32S/32Q/16D; Singles – Doubles	(Germany) Julia Görges (Germany) Anna-Lena Grönefeld; 6–4, 6–4	(Russia) Vitalia Diatchenko (Belarus) Tatiana Poutchek	(Russia) Anna Chakvetadze (China) Li Na	(Germany) Julia Görges (Slovenia) Polona Hercog (Romania) Sorana Cîrstea (Germany) Angelique Kerber
Aug 9	W&S Financial Group Women's Open; Mason, United States; WTA Premier 5 Hard – $2,000,000 – 56S/48Q/28D; Singles – Doubles	(Belgium) Kim Clijsters; 2–6, 7–6^{(7–4)}, 6–2	(Russia) Maria Sharapova	(Serbia) Ana Ivanovic (Russia) Anastasia Pavlyuchenkova	(Uzbekistan) Akgul Amanmuradova (Italy) Flavia Pennetta (Belgium) Yanina Wickmayer (France) Marion Bartoli
Aug 9	W&S Financial Group Women's Open; Mason, United States; WTA Premier 5 Hard – $2,000,000 – 56S/48Q/28D; Singles – Doubles	(Belarus) Victoria Azarenka (Russia) Maria Kirilenko; 7–6^{(7–4)}, 7–6(8)	(United States) Lisa Raymond (Australia) Rennae Stubbs	(Serbia) Ana Ivanovic (Russia) Anastasia Pavlyuchenkova	(Uzbekistan) Akgul Amanmuradova (Italy) Flavia Pennetta (Belgium) Yanina Wickmayer (France) Marion Bartoli
Aug 16	Rogers Cup; Montreal, Canada; WTA Premier 5 Hard – $2,000,000 – 56S/32Q/28D; Singles – Doubles	(Denmark) Caroline Wozniacki; 6–3, 6–2	(Russia) Vera Zvonareva	(Belarus) Victoria Azarenka (Russia) Svetlana Kuznetsova	(France) Marion Bartoli (Belgium) Kim Clijsters (China) Zheng Jie (Italy) Francesca Schiavone
Aug 16	Rogers Cup; Montreal, Canada; WTA Premier 5 Hard – $2,000,000 – 56S/32Q/28D; Singles – Doubles	(Argentina) Gisela Dulko (Italy) Flavia Pennetta; 7–5, 3–6, [12–10]	(Czech Republic) Květa Peschke (Slovenia) Katarina Srebotnik	(Belarus) Victoria Azarenka (Russia) Svetlana Kuznetsova	(France) Marion Bartoli (Belgium) Kim Clijsters (China) Zheng Jie (Italy) Francesca Schiavone
Aug 23	Pilot Pen Tennis; New Haven, United States; WTA Premier; Hard – $600,000 – 30S/32Q/16D; Singles – Doubles	(Denmark) Caroline Wozniacki; 6–3, 3–6, 6–3	(Russia) Nadia Petrova	(Russia) Elena Dementieva (Russia) Maria Kirilenko	(Italy) Flavia Pennetta (France) Marion Bartoli (Russia) Dinara Safina (Australia) Samantha Stosur
Aug 23	Pilot Pen Tennis; New Haven, United States; WTA Premier; Hard – $600,000 – 30S/32Q/16D; Singles – Doubles	(Czech Republic) Květa Peschke (Slovenia) Katarina Srebotnik; 7–5, 6–0	(United States) Bethanie Mattek-Sands (United States) Meghann Shaughnessy	(Russia) Elena Dementieva (Russia) Maria Kirilenko	(Italy) Flavia Pennetta (France) Marion Bartoli (Russia) Dinara Safina (Australia) Samantha Stosur
Aug 30; Sep 6	US Open; New York City, United States; Grand Slam; Hard – $10,258,000; 128S/128Q/64D/32X; Singles – Doubles – Mixed doubles	(Belgium) Kim Clijsters; 6–2, 6–1	(Russia) Vera Zvonareva	(Denmark) Caroline Wozniacki (United States) Venus Williams	(Slovakia) Dominika Cibulková (Estonia) Kaia Kanepi (Italy) Francesca Schiavone (Australia) Samantha Stosur
Aug 30; Sep 6	US Open; New York City, United States; Grand Slam; Hard – $10,258,000; 128S/128Q/64D/32X; Singles – Doubles – Mixed doubles	(United States) Vania King (Kazakhstan) Yaroslava Shvedova; 2–6, 6–4, 7–6^{(7–4)}	(United States) Liezel Huber (Russia) Nadia Petrova	(Denmark) Caroline Wozniacki (United States) Venus Williams	(Slovakia) Dominika Cibulková (Estonia) Kaia Kanepi (Italy) Francesca Schiavone (Australia) Samantha Stosur
Aug 30; Sep 6	US Open; New York City, United States; Grand Slam; Hard – $10,258,000; 128S/128Q/64D/32X; Singles – Doubles – Mixed doubles	(United States) Liezel Huber (United States) Bob Bryan; 6–4, 6–4	(Czech Republic) Květa Peschke (Pakistan) Aisam-ul-Haq Qureshi	(Denmark) Caroline Wozniacki (United States) Venus Williams	(Slovakia) Dominika Cibulková (Estonia) Kaia Kanepi (Italy) Francesca Schiavone (Australia) Samantha Stosur

=== September ===
Week	Tournament	Champions	Runners-up	Semifinalists	Quarterfinalists
Sep 13	Guangzhou International Women's Open; Guangzhou, China; WTA International; Hard – $220,000 – 32S/32Q/16D; Singles – Doubles	(Australia) Jarmila Groth; 6–1, 6–4	(Russia) Alla Kudryavtseva	(Romania) Edina Gallovits (China) Zhang Shuai	(Italy) Maria Elena Camerin (China) Han Xinyun (India) Sania Mirza (Russia) Ksenia Pervak
Sep 13	Guangzhou International Women's Open; Guangzhou, China; WTA International; Hard – $220,000 – 32S/32Q/16D; Singles – Doubles	(Romania) Edina Gallovits (India) Sania Mirza; 7–5, 6–3	(China) Han Xinyun (China) Liu Wanting	(Romania) Edina Gallovits (China) Zhang Shuai	(Italy) Maria Elena Camerin (China) Han Xinyun (India) Sania Mirza (Russia) Ksenia Pervak
Sep 13	Bell Challenge; Quebec City, Canada; WTA International; Carpet (i) – $220,000 – 32S/32Q/16D; Singles – Doubles	(Austria) Tamira Paszek; 7–6^{(8–6)}, 2–6, 7–5	(United States) Bethanie Mattek-Sands	(Czech Republic) Lucie Šafářová (United States) Christina McHale	(Canada) Rebecca Marino (United States) Melanie Oudin (United States) Alexa Glatch (Sweden) Sofia Arvidsson
Sep 13	Bell Challenge; Quebec City, Canada; WTA International; Carpet (i) – $220,000 – 32S/32Q/16D; Singles – Doubles	(Sweden) Sofia Arvidsson (Sweden) Johanna Larsson; 6–1, 2–6, [10–6]	(United States) Bethanie Mattek-Sands (Czech Republic) Barbora Záhlavová-Strýcová	(Czech Republic) Lucie Šafářová (United States) Christina McHale	(Canada) Rebecca Marino (United States) Melanie Oudin (United States) Alexa Glatch (Sweden) Sofia Arvidsson
Sep 20	Hansol Korea Open; Seoul, South Korea; WTA International; Hard – $220,000 – 32S/32Q/16D; Singles – Doubles	(Russia) Alisa Kleybanova; 6–1, 6–3	(Czech Republic) Klára Zakopalová	(Russia) Nadia Petrova (Hungary) Ágnes Szávay	(Belgium) Kirsten Flipkens (Russia) Dinara Safina (Russia) Ekaterina Makarova (Japan) Kimiko Date-Krumm
Sep 20	Hansol Korea Open; Seoul, South Korea; WTA International; Hard – $220,000 – 32S/32Q/16D; Singles – Doubles	(Germany) Julia Görges (Slovenia) Polona Hercog; 6–3, 6–4	(South Africa) Natalie Grandin (Czech Republic) Vladimíra Uhlířová	(Russia) Nadia Petrova (Hungary) Ágnes Szávay	(Belgium) Kirsten Flipkens (Russia) Dinara Safina (Russia) Ekaterina Makarova (Japan) Kimiko Date-Krumm
Sep 20	Tashkent Open; Tashkent, Uzbekistan; WTA International; Hard – $220,000 – 32S/32Q/16D; Singles – Doubles	(Russia) Alla Kudryavtseva; 6–4, 6–4	(Russia) Elena Vesnina	(Romania) Monica Niculescu (Russia) Evgeniya Rodina	(Romania) Alexandra Dulgheru (Belarus) Darya Kustova (Switzerland) Stefanie Vögele (Uzbekistan) Akgul Amanmuradova
Sep 20	Tashkent Open; Tashkent, Uzbekistan; WTA International; Hard – $220,000 – 32S/32Q/16D; Singles – Doubles	(Russia) Alexandra Panova (Belarus) Tatiana Poutchek; 6–3, 6–4	(Romania) Alexandra Dulgheru (Slovakia) Magdaléna Rybáriková	(Romania) Monica Niculescu (Russia) Evgeniya Rodina	(Romania) Alexandra Dulgheru (Belarus) Darya Kustova (Switzerland) Stefanie Vögele (Uzbekistan) Akgul Amanmuradova
Sep 27	Toray Pan Pacific Open; Tokyo, Japan; WTA Premier 5 Hard – $2,000,000 – 56S/32Q/16D; Singles – Doubles	(Denmark) Caroline Wozniacki; 1–6, 6–2, 6–3	(Russia) Elena Dementieva	(Belarus) Victoria Azarenka (Italy) Francesca Schiavone	(Poland) Agnieszka Radwańska (United States) CoCo Vandeweghe (Estonia) Kaia Kanepi (Russia) Vera Zvonareva
Sep 27	Toray Pan Pacific Open; Tokyo, Japan; WTA Premier 5 Hard – $2,000,000 – 56S/32Q/16D; Singles – Doubles	(Czech Republic) Iveta Benešová (Czech Republic) Barbora Záhlavová-Strýcová; 6–4, 4–6, [10–8]	(Israel) Shahar Pe'er (China) Peng Shuai	(Belarus) Victoria Azarenka (Italy) Francesca Schiavone	(Poland) Agnieszka Radwańska (United States) CoCo Vandeweghe (Estonia) Kaia Kanepi (Russia) Vera Zvonareva

=== October ===
Week	Tournament	Champions	Runners-up	Semifinalists	Quarterfinalists
Oct 4	China Open; Beijing, China; WTA Premier Mandatory; Hard – $4,500,000 – 56S/32Q/28D; Singles – Doubles	(Denmark) Caroline Wozniacki; 6–3, 3–6, 6–3	(Russia) Vera Zvonareva	(Israel) Shahar Pe'er (China) Li Na	(Serbia) Ana Ivanovic (Switzerland) Timea Bacsinszky (Latvia) Anastasija Sevastova (Italy) Francesca Schiavone
Oct 4	China Open; Beijing, China; WTA Premier Mandatory; Hard – $4,500,000 – 56S/32Q/28D; Singles – Doubles	(Chinese Taipei) Chuang Chia-jung (Belarus) Olga Govortsova; 7–6^{(7–2)}, 1–6, [10–7]	(Argentina) Gisela Dulko (Italy) Flavia Pennetta	(Israel) Shahar Pe'er (China) Li Na	(Serbia) Ana Ivanovic (Switzerland) Timea Bacsinszky (Latvia) Anastasija Sevastova (Italy) Francesca Schiavone
Oct 11	Generali Ladies Linz; Linz, Austria; WTA International; Hard (i) – $220,000 – 32S/32Q/16D; Singles – Doubles	(Serbia) Ana Ivanovic; 6–1, 6–2	(Switzerland) Patty Schnyder	(Italy) Roberta Vinci (Germany) Andrea Petkovic	(Italy) Sara Errani (Germany) Julia Görges (Greece) Eleni Daniilidou (Slovakia) Daniela Hantuchová
Oct 11	Generali Ladies Linz; Linz, Austria; WTA International; Hard (i) – $220,000 – 32S/32Q/16D; Singles – Doubles	(Czech Republic) Renata Voráčová (Czech Republic) Barbora Záhlavová-Strýcová; 7–5, 7–6^{(8–6)}	(Czech Republic) Květa Peschke (Slovenia) Katarina Srebotnik	(Italy) Roberta Vinci (Germany) Andrea Petkovic	(Italy) Sara Errani (Germany) Julia Görges (Greece) Eleni Daniilidou (Slovakia) Daniela Hantuchová
Oct 11	HP Open; Osaka, Japan; WTA International; Hard – $220,000 – 32S/32Q/16D; Singles – Doubles	(Thailand) Tamarine Tanasugarn; 7–5, 6–7^{(4–7)}, 6–1	(Japan) Kimiko Date-Krumm	(Israel) Shahar Pe'er (France) Marion Bartoli	(Australia) Samantha Stosur (Czech Republic) Iveta Benešová (Chinese Taipei) Chang Kai-chen (United States) Jill Craybas
Oct 11	HP Open; Osaka, Japan; WTA International; Hard – $220,000 – 32S/32Q/16D; Singles – Doubles	(Chinese Taipei) Chang Kai-chen (United States) Lilia Osterloh; 6–0, 6–3	(Japan) Shuko Aoyama (Japan) Rika Fujiwara	(Israel) Shahar Pe'er (France) Marion Bartoli	(Australia) Samantha Stosur (Czech Republic) Iveta Benešová (Chinese Taipei) Chang Kai-chen (United States) Jill Craybas
Oct 18	Kremlin Cup; Moscow, Russia; WTA Premier; Hard (i) – $1,000,000 – 30S/32Q/16D; Singles – Doubles	(Belarus) Victoria Azarenka; 6–3, 6–4	(Russia) Maria Kirilenko	(Russia) Vera Dushevina (Spain) María José Martínez Sánchez	(Kazakhstan) Zarina Diyas (Russia) Anna Chakvetadze (Slovakia) Dominika Cibulková (Russia) Alisa Kleybanova
Oct 18	Kremlin Cup; Moscow, Russia; WTA Premier; Hard (i) – $1,000,000 – 30S/32Q/16D; Singles – Doubles	(Argentina) Gisela Dulko (Italy) Flavia Pennetta; 6–3, 2–6, [10–6]	(Italy) Sara Errani (Spain) María José Martínez Sánchez	(Russia) Vera Dushevina (Spain) María José Martínez Sánchez	(Kazakhstan) Zarina Diyas (Russia) Anna Chakvetadze (Slovakia) Dominika Cibulková (Russia) Alisa Kleybanova
Oct 18	BGL Luxembourg Open; Kockelscheuer, Luxembourg; WTA International; Hard (i) – $220,000 – 32S/32Q/16D; Singles – Doubles	(Italy) Roberta Vinci; 6–3, 6–4	(Germany) Julia Görges	(Germany) Angelique Kerber (United Kingdom) Anne Keothavong	(Slovenia) Polona Hercog (Serbia) Ana Ivanovic (Czech Republic) Iveta Benešová (Belgium) Kirsten Flipkens
Oct 18	BGL Luxembourg Open; Kockelscheuer, Luxembourg; WTA International; Hard (i) – $220,000 – 32S/32Q/16D; Singles – Doubles	(Switzerland) Timea Bacsinszky (Italy) Tathiana Garbin; 6–4, 6–4	(Czech Republic) Iveta Benešová (Czech Republic) Barbora Záhlavová-Strýcová	(Germany) Angelique Kerber (United Kingdom) Anne Keothavong	(Slovenia) Polona Hercog (Serbia) Ana Ivanovic (Czech Republic) Iveta Benešová (Belgium) Kirsten Flipkens
Oct 25	Sony Ericsson Championships; Doha, Qatar; Year-end championships Hard – $4,550,000 – 8S (RR)/4D; Singles – Doubles	(Belgium) Kim Clijsters; 6–3, 5–7, 6–3	(Denmark) Caroline Wozniacki	(Australia) Samantha Stosur (Russia) Vera Zvonareva	Round robin losers (Italy) Francesca Schiavone (Russia) Elena Dementieva (Serbia) Jelena Janković (Belarus) Victoria Azarenka
Oct 25	Sony Ericsson Championships; Doha, Qatar; Year-end championships Hard – $4,550,000 – 8S (RR)/4D; Singles – Doubles	(Argentina) Gisela Dulko (Italy) Flavia Pennetta; 7–5, 6–4	(Czech Republic) Květa Peschke (Slovenia) Katarina Srebotnik	(Australia) Samantha Stosur (Russia) Vera Zvonareva	Round robin losers (Italy) Francesca Schiavone (Russia) Elena Dementieva (Serbia) Jelena Janković (Belarus) Victoria Azarenka

=== November ===
Week	Tournament	Champions	Runners-up	Semifinalists	Quarterfinalists
Nov 1	Commonwealth Bank Tournament of Champions; Bali, Indonesia; Year-end championships Hard (i) – $600,000 – 8S; Singles	(Serbia) Ana Ivanovic; 6–2, 7–6^{(7–5)}	(Russia) Alisa Kleybanova	Third Place match winner (Japan) Kimiko Date-Krumm; 7–5, 7–5	(China) Li Na (Russia) Anastasia Pavlyuchenkova (Belgium) Yanina Wickmayer (France) Aravane Rezaï
Nov 1	Commonwealth Bank Tournament of Champions; Bali, Indonesia; Year-end championships Hard (i) – $600,000 – 8S; Singles	(Serbia) Ana Ivanovic; 6–2, 7–6^{(7–5)}	(Russia) Alisa Kleybanova	Third Place match loser (Slovakia) Daniela Hantuchová	(China) Li Na (Russia) Anastasia Pavlyuchenkova (Belgium) Yanina Wickmayer (France) Aravane Rezaï
Nov 1	Fed Cup Final; San Diego, United States – hard (i)	Italy; 3–1	United States		

== Statistical information ==
These tables present the number of singles (S), doubles (D), and mixed doubles (X) titles won by each player and each nation during the season, within all the tournament categories of the 2010 Sony Ericsson WTA Tour: the Grand Slam tournaments, the Year-end championships, the WTA Premier tournaments and the WTA International tournaments. The players/nations are sorted by:

1. total number of titles (a doubles title won by two players representing the same nation counts as only one win for the nation);
2. highest amount of highest category tournaments (for example, having a single Grand Slam gives preference over any kind of combination without a Grand Slam title);
3. a singles > doubles > mixed doubles hierarchy;
4. alphabetical order (by family names for players).

To avoid confusion and double counting, these tables should be updated only after an event is completed.

=== Titles won by player ===
Total titles	Player	Grand Slam tournaments			Year-end championships		Premier tournaments		International tournaments		All titles		
Total titles	Player	Singles	Doubles	Mixed	Singles	Doubles	Singles	Doubles	Singles	Doubles	Singles	Doubles	Mixed
8	(Italy) Flavia Pennetta					1		5	1	1	1	7	
8	(Argentina) Gisela Dulko					1		5		2		8	
6	(Denmark) Caroline Wozniacki						4		2		6		
5	(United States) Serena Williams	2	2					1			2	3	
5	(United States) Venus Williams		2				1	1	1		2	3	
5	(Zimbabwe) Cara Black			2				1		2		3	**2**
5	(Belgium) Kim Clijsters	1			1		2		1		5		
5	(United States) Liezel Huber			1				3		1		4	**1**
5	(Czech Republic) Iveta Benešová							2	1	2	1	4	
5	(Czech Republic) Barbora Záhlavová-Strýcová							2		3		5	
4	(United States) Vania King		2							2		4	
3	(Slovenia) Katarina Srebotnik			1				2				2	**1**
3	(Belarus) Victoria Azarenka						2	1			2	1	
3	(Czech Republic) Květa Peschke							2		1		3	
3	(Germany) Julia Görges								1	2	1	2	
3	(Italy) Roberta Vinci								1	2	1	2	
3	(Switzerland) Timea Bacsinszky									3		3	
3	(Italy) Sara Errani									3		3	
3	(Italy) Tathiana Garbin									3		3	
3	(Spain) Anabel Medina Garrigues									3		3	
2	(Kazakhstan) Yaroslava Shvedova		2									2	
2	(Italy) Francesca Schiavone	1							1		2		
2	(Serbia) Ana Ivanovic				1				1		2		
2	(Russia) Elena Dementieva						2				2		
2	(Spain) María José Martínez Sánchez						1	1			1	1	
2	(Belgium) Justine Henin						1		1		2		
2	(France) Aravane Rezaï						1		1		2		
2	(Russia) Maria Kirilenko							2				2	
2	(United States) Lisa Raymond							1		1		2	
2	(China) Zheng Jie							1		1		2	
2	(Russia) Alisa Kleybanova								2		2		
2	(Russia) Anastasia Pavlyuchenkova								2		2		
2	(Russia) Maria Sharapova								2		2		
2	(Hungary) Ágnes Szávay								2		2		
2	(Russia) Alla Kudryavtseva								1	1	1	1	
2	(Thailand) Tamarine Tanasugarn								1	1	1	1	
2	(Romania) Edina Gallovits									2		2	
2	(Slovenia) Polona Hercog									2		2	
2	(Czech Republic) Lucie Hradecká									2		2	
1	(Romania) Alexandra Dulgheru						1				1		
1	(Serbia) Jelena Janković						1				1		
1	(Russia) Svetlana Kuznetsova						1				1		
1	(Russia) Ekaterina Makarova						1				1		
1	(Australia) Samantha Stosur						1				1		
1	(Chinese Taipei) Chuang Chia-jung							1				1	
1	(United States) Lindsay Davenport							1				1	
1	(Belarus) Olga Govortsova							1				1	
1	(Spain) Nuria Llagostera Vives							1				1	
1	(Russia) Nadia Petrova							1				1	
1	(Spain) Virginia Ruano Pascual							1				1	
1	(United States) Meghann Shaughnessy							1				1	
1	(Australia) Rennae Stubbs							1				1	
1	(Ukraine) Alona Bondarenko								1		1		
1	(Russia) Anna Chakvetadze								1		1		
1	(Colombia) Mariana Duque Mariño								1		1		
1	(Australia) Jarmila Groth								1		1		
1	(Estonia) Kaia Kanepi								1		1		
1	(China) Li Na								1		1		
1	(Austria) Tamira Paszek								1		1		
1	(Latvia) Anastasija Sevastova								1		1		
1	(Belgium) Yanina Wickmayer								1		1		
1	(Russia) Vera Zvonareva								1		1		
1	(Sweden) Sofia Arvidsson									1		1	
1	(Italy) Alberta Brianti									1		1	
1	(Chinese Taipei) Chan Yung-jan									1		1	
1	(Chinese Taipei) Chang Kai-chen									1		1	
1	(Chinese Taipei) Chuang Chia-jung									1		1	
1	(Romania) Sorana Cîrstea									1		1	
1	(France) Alizé Cornet									1		1	
1	(Greece) Eleni Daniilidou									1		1	
1	(New Zealand) Marina Erakovic									1		1	
1	(Germany) Anna-Lena Grönefeld									1		1	
1	(Czech Republic) Andrea Hlaváčková									1		1	
1	(Russia) Maria Kondratieva									1		1	
1	(Netherlands) Michaëlla Krajicek									1		1	
1	(Sweden) Johanna Larsson									1		1	
1	(United States) Bethanie Mattek-Sands									1		1	
1	(India) Sania Mirza									1		1	
1	(United States) Lilia Osterloh									1		1	
1	(Russia) Alexandra Panova									1		1	
1	(Belarus) Tatiana Poutchek									1		1	
1	(Australia) Anastasia Rodionova									1		1	
1	(Czech Republic) Vladimíra Uhlířová									1		1	
1	(Czech Republic) Renata Voráčová									1		1	
1	(Germany) Jasmin Wöhr									1		1	
1	(China) Yan Zi									1		1	

=== Titles won by nation ===
Total titles	Country	Grand Slam tournaments			Year-end championships		Premier tournaments		International tournaments		All titles		
Total titles	Country	Singles	Doubles	Mixed	Singles	Doubles	Singles	Doubles	Singles	Doubles	Singles	Doubles	Mixed
21	United States	2	4	1			1	6	1	6	4	16	**1**
19	Russia						4	3	9	3	13	6	
17	Italy	1				1		5	3	7	4	13	
13	Czech Republic							4	1	8	1	12	
8	Belgium	1			1		3		3		8		
8	Argentina					1		5		2		8	
6	Denmark						4		2		6		
6	Spain						1	2		3	1	5	
5	Zimbabwe			2				1		2		3	**2**
5	Slovenia			1				2		2		4	**1**
5	Belarus						2	2		1	2	3	
4	Australia						1	1	1	1	2	2	
4	Romania						1			3	1	3	
4	China							1	1	2	1	3	
4	Chinese Taipei							1		3		4	
4	Germany								1	3	1	3	
3	Serbia				1		1		1		3		
3	France						1		1	1	2	1	
3	Switzerland									3		3	
2	Kazakhstan		2									2	
2	Hungary								2		2		
2	Thailand								1	1	1	1	
1	Austria								1		1		
1	Colombia								1		1		
1	Estonia								1		1		
1	Latvia								1		1		
1	Ukraine								1		1		
1	Greece									1		1	
1	India									1		1	
1	Netherlands									1		1	
1	New Zealand									1		1	
1	Sweden									1		1	

=== Titles information ===
The following players won their first title in singles (S), doubles (D) or mixed doubles (X):

- (Sweden) Sofia Arvidsson – Quebec City (D)
- (Switzerland) Timea Bacsinszky – Budapest (D)
- (Italy) Alberta Brianti – Palermo (D)
- (Chinese Taipei) Chang Kai-chen – Osaka (D)
- (Colombia) Mariana Duque Mariño – Bogotá (S)
- (Romania) Edina Gallovits – Bogotá (D)
- (Germany) Julia Görges – Bad Gastein (S)
- (Australia) Jarmila Groth – Guangzhou (S)
- (Slovenia) Polona Hercog – Acapulco (D)
- (Estonia) Kaia Kanepi – Palermo (S)
- (Russia) Alisa Kleybanova – Kuala Lumpur (S)
- (Russia) Maria Kondratieva – Portorož (D)
- (Russia) Alla Kudryavtseva – Tashkent (S)
- (Sweden) Johanna Larsson – Quebec City (D)
- (Russia) Ekaterina Makarova – Eastbourne (S)
- (Russia) Alexandra Panova – Tashkent (D)
- (Russia) Anastasia Pavlyuchenkova – Monterrey (S)
- (Latvia) Anastasija Sevastova – Estoril (S)

The following players completed a successful title defence in singles (S), doubles (D) or mixed doubles (X):

- (Zimbabwe) Cara Black – Birmingham (D)
- (Belgium) Kim Clijsters – **US Open (S)**
- (Russia) Elena Dementieva – Sydney (S)
- (Romania) Alexandra Dulgheru – Warsaw (S)
- (Argentina) Gisela Dulko – Båstad (D)
- (Czech Republic) Lucie Hradecká – Bad Gastein (D)
- (Italy) Flavia Pennetta – Båstad (D)
- (Russia) Nadia Petrova – Charleston (D)
- (Belarus) Tatiana Poutchek – Tashkent (D)
- (Hungary) Ágnes Szávay – Budapest (S)
- (Thailand) Tamarine Tanasugarn – Pattaya (D)
- (Czech Republic) Vladimíra Uhlířová – Potorož (D)
- (United States) Serena Williams – **Australian Open (S/D)**, **Wimbledon (S)**
- (United States) Venus Williams – **Australian Open (D)**, Dubai (S), Acapulco (S)
- (Denmark) Caroline Wozniacki – Ponte Vedra Beach (S), New Haven (S)
- (Russia) Vera Zvonareva – Pattaya (S)

=== Best ranking ===
The following players achieved their career-high ranking in this season inside top 50 (players who made their top 10 debut indicated in bold): (Note: Name and ranking in bold means the player entered the top 10 or became world No. 1 for the first time, and only the ranking in bold means the player had entered the top 10 previously but reached a new career-high ranking.)

Singles

- (Poland) Agnieszka Radwańska (reached place **No. 8** on February 22)
- (Russia) Alisa Kleybanova (reached place No. 22 on March 22)
- (Belgium) Yanina Wickmayer (reached place No. 12 on April 19)
- (United States) Melanie Oudin (reached place No. 31 on April 19)
- (Spain) María José Martínez Sánchez (reached place No. 19 on May 10)
- (Italy) **Francesca Schiavone** (reached place **No. 6** on June 7)
- (Switzerland) Timea Bacsinszky (reached place No. 37 on June 7)
- (Kazakhstan) Yaroslava Shvedova (reached place No. 29 on June 21)
- (Australia) **Samantha Stosur** (reached place **No. 5** on July 5)
- (Czech Republic) Petra Kvitová (reached place No. 29 on July 5)
- (Spain) Arantxa Parra Santonja (reached place No. 46 on July 12)
- (Czech Republic) Barbora Strýcová (reached place No. 39 on July 19)
- (Germany) Julia Görges (reached place No. 40 on August 9)
- (China) **Li Na** (reached place **No. 9** on August 23)
- (Romania) Alexandra Dulgheru (reached place No. 27 on August 23)
- (Germany) Angelique Kerber (reached place No. 46 on August 30)
- (Bulgaria) Tsvetana Pironkova (reached place No. 31 on September 13)
- (Slovenia) Polona Hercog (reached place No. 43 on September 13)
- (United Kingdom) Elena Baltacha (reached place No. 49 on September 13)
- (Australia) Jarmila Groth (reached place No. 41 on September 20)
- (Russia) Anastasia Pavlyuchenkova (reached place No. 19 on October 4)
- (Denmark) **Caroline Wozniacki** (reached place **No. 1** on October 11)
- (Israel) Shahar Pe'er (reached place No. 13 on October 11)
- (France) Aravane Rezaï (reached place No. 15 on October 11)
- (Latvia) Anastasija Sevastova (reached place No. 44 on October 11)
- (Germany) Andrea Petkovic (reached place No. 32 on October 18)
- (Russia) Vera Zvonareva (reached place **No. 2** on October 25)

== Rankings ==
=== Singles ===
The following is the 2010 top 20 in the Race To The Championships and the top 20 rank players in the world. Premier Mandatory Events are counted for players in the top 10, even if they did not compete, unless there is an injury excuse.

Race Singles (as of October 25, 2010)
Rk	Player	Points	Tour
1	Caroline Wozniacki (DEN)	7,270	21
2	Vera Zvonareva (RUS)	6,096	18
3	Serena Williams (USA)	5,355	12(6)
4	Kim Clijsters (BEL)	5,295	13
5	Venus Williams (USA)	4,985	14(9)
6	Francesca Schiavone (ITA)	4,595	21
7	Samantha Stosur (AUS)	4,572	17
8	Jelena Janković (SRB)	4,236	20
9	Elena Dementieva (RUS)	4,085	20
10	Victoria Azarenka (BLR)	3,935	20
11	Li Na (CHN)	3,540	20
12	Justine Henin (BEL)	3,415	11
13	Shahar Pe'er (ISR)	3,365	21
14	Agnieszka Radwańska (POL)	3,000	18
15	Nadia Petrova (RUS)	2,702	20
16	Marion Bartoli (FRA)	2,645	21
17	Maria Sharapova (RUS)	2,591	14
18	Aravane Rezaï (FRA)	2,570	25
19	Maria Kirilenko (RUS)	2,550	23
20	Anastasia Pavlyuchenkova (RUS)	2,520	23

WTA Singles Year-End Rankings
Rk	Player	Nation	Points	Change
1	Caroline Wozniacki	DEN	8,035	+3
2	Vera Zvonareva	RUS	6,785	+7
3	Kim Clijsters	BEL	6,635	+15
4	Serena Williams	USA	5,355	-3
5	Venus Williams	USA	4,985	+1
6	Samantha Stosur	AUS	4,982	+7
7	Francesca Schiavone	ITA	4,935	+10
8	Jelena Janković	SRB	4,445	=
9	Elena Dementieva	RUS	4,335	-4
10	Victoria Azarenka	BLR	4,235	-3
11	Li Na	CHN	3,545	+4
12	Justine Henin	BEL	3,415	NR
13	Shahar Pe'er	ISR	3,410	+18
14	Agnieszka Radwańska	POL	3,000	-4
15	Nadia Petrova	RUS	2,702	+5
16	Marion Bartoli	FRA	2,645	-5
17	Ana Ivanovic	SRB	2,600	+5
18	Maria Sharapova	RUS	2,591	-4
19	Aravane Rezaï	FRA	2,575	+7
20	Maria Kirilenko	RUS	2,550	+43

==== Number 1 Ranking ====
Holder	Date gained	Date forfeited
Serena Williams (USA)	Year-End 2009	10 October 2010
Caroline Wozniacki (DEN)	11 October 2010	Year-End 2010

=== Doubles ===
The following is the 2010 top 20 in the Race To The Championships – Doubles and the top 20 individual ranked doubles players.

Race Doubles (as of October 11, 2010)
Rk	Team	Points	Tour
1	Gisela Dulko (ARG); Flavia Pennetta (ITA)	8111	15
2	Květa Peschke (CZE); Katarina Srebotnik (SLO)	6396	16
3	Serena Williams (USA); Venus Williams (USA)	5500	4
4	Lisa Raymond (USA); Rennae Stubbs (AUS)	5104	18
5	Vania King (USA); Yaroslava Shvedova (KAZ)	4978	10
6	Nuria Llagostera Vives (ESP); María José Martínez Sánchez (ESP)	3927	12
7	Zheng Jie (CHN); Chan Yung-jan (TPE)	3620	12
8	Iveta Benešová (CZE); Barbora Záhlavová-Strýcová (CZE)	3267	14
9	Cara Black (ZIM); Liezel Huber (USA)	3060	7
10	Maria Kirilenko (RUS); Agnieszka Radwańska (POL)	2840	9

WTA Doubles Year-End Rankings
Rk	Player	Nation	Points	Change
1	Gisela Dulko	ARG	8,570	+26
2	Flavia Pennetta	ITA	8,570	+27
3	Liezel Huber	USA	7,590	-2
4	Vania King	USA	6,920	+28
5	Květa Peschke	CZE	6,860	+21
6	Katarina Srebotnik	SLO	6,830	+117
7	Yaroslava Shvedova	KAZ	6,240	+42
8	Nadia Petrova	RUS	5,530	+8
9	Lisa Raymond	USA	5,520	+9
10	Rennae Stubbs	AUS	5,520	-3
11	Serena Williams	USA	5,500	-8
=	Venus Williams	USA	5,500	-8
13	Cara Black	ZIM	5,115	-12
14	Maria Kirilenko	RUS	4,425	+7
15	María José Martínez Sánchez	ESP	4,400	-9
16	Zheng Jie	CHN	4,105	+8
17	Bethanie Mattek-Sands	USA	4,055	=
18	Chan Yung-jan	TPE	4,030	+34
19	Nuria Llagostera Vives	ESP	3,926	-14
20	Barbora Záhlavová-Strýcová	CZE	3,775	+15

==== Number 1 Ranking ====
Holder	Date gained	Date forfeited
Cara Black (ZIM); Liezel Huber (USA)	Year-End 2009	19 April 2010
Liezel Huber (USA)	19 April 2010	7 June 2010
Serena Williams (USA); Venus Williams (USA)	7 June 2010	2 August 2010
Liezel Huber (USA)	2 August 2010	1 November 2010
Gisela Dulko (ARG)	1 November 2010	Year-End 2010

== Prize money leaders ==
The top-19 players earned over $1,000,000.

As of 8 November 2010

#	Country	Player	Singles	Doubles	Mixed	Bonus Pool ^{1}	Year-to-date
1.	BEL	Kim Clijsters	$5,019,440	$7,025	$8,595	$0	$5,035,060
2.	DEN	Caroline Wozniacki	$3,886,512	$34,976	$0	$525,000	$4,446,488
3.	USA	Serena Williams	$3,707,007	$559,004	$0	$0	$4,266,011
4.	RUS	Vera Zvonareva	$3,000,667	$141,846	$2,128	$300,000	$3,444,641
5.	USA	Venus Williams	$2,055,778	$559,004	$0	$0	$2,614,782
6.	ITA	Francesca Schiavone	$2,360,751	$95,883	$0	$0	$2,456,634
7.	SRB	Jelena Janković	$1,803,164	$33,827	$0	$300,000	$2,136,991
8.	AUS	Samantha Stosur	$1,917,832	$168,251	$4,257	$0	$2,090,340
9.	RUS	Elena Dementieva	$1,346,690	$0	$0	$550,000	$1,896,690
10.	BLR	Victoria Azarenka	$1,278,601	$98,427	$0	$275,000	$1,652,028

^{1}Only for 2008 year-end top 10, Certain players receive fines for skipping events

== Statistics leaders ==
As of October 25, 2010. Source

Aces
	Player	Aces	Matches
1	(Russia) Nadia Petrova	306	51
2	(Australia) Samantha Stosur	280	58
3	(United States) Serena Williams	248	29
4	(Germany) Andrea Petkovic	224	56
5	(Russia) Maria Kirilenko	221	60
6	(United States) Venus Williams	212	45
7	(France) Aravane Rezaï	204	58
8	(Italy) Flavia Pennetta	198	67
9	(France) Marion Bartoli	187	55
10	(Czech Republic) Lucie Šafářová	185	49

Service games won
	Player	%	Matches
1	(United States) Serena Williams	81.4	29
2	(Australia) Samantha Stosur	77.2	58
3	(Belgium) Kim Clijsters	76.3	41
4	(Belgium) Justine Henin	75.7	39
5	(United States) Venus Williams	75.7	45
6	(Russia) Maria Sharapova	75.2	44
7	(Croatia) Karolina Šprem	75.0	20
8	(Australia) Jarmila Groth	74.9	31
9	(Russia) Nadia Petrova	74.6	51
10	(Russia) Vera Zvonareva	73.4	63

Break points saved
	Player	%	Matches
1	(United States) Serena Williams	65.9	29
2	(Russia) Nadia Petrova	65.3	51
3	(Germany) Kristina Barrois	61.5	26
4	(Denmark) Caroline Wozniacki	61.2	74
5	(Australia) Samantha Stosur	61.0	58
6	(Belgium) Kim Clijsters	60.8	41
7	(United Kingdom) Elena Baltacha	60.3	30
8	(Belgium) Justine Henin	60.2	39
9	(United States) Bethanie Mattek-Sands	59.9	27
10	(Italy) Flavia Pennetta	59.9	67

First serve percentage
	Player	%	Matches
1	(Italy) Sara Errani	75.8	65
2	(Austria) Yvonne Meusburger	74.8	19
3	(Ukraine) Alona Bondarenko	71.4	43
4	(Belarus) Victoria Azarenka	71.3	59
5	(China) Zheng Jie	70.3	41
6	(Spain) Carla Suárez Navarro	70.2	35
7	(China) Peng Shuai	69.4	27
8	(Romania) Alexandra Dulgheru	69.3	57
9	(Austria) Sybille Bammer	69.1	34
10	(Denmark) Caroline Wozniacki	68.6	74

First service points won
	Player	%	Matches
1	(United States) Serena Williams	75.3	29
2	(United States) Venus Williams	72.8	45
3	(Croatia) Karolina Šprem	72.7	20
4	(Russia) Maria Sharapova	71.6	44
5	(Belgium) Justine Henin	70.8	39
6	(Russia) Nadia Petrova	70.5	51
7	(Australia) Jarmila Groth	70.1	31
8	(Australia) Samantha Stosur	69.4	58
9	(Serbia) Ana Ivanovic	69.3	48
10	(Spain) María José Martínez Sánchez	68.8	39

Second serve points won
	Player	%	Matches
1	(Australia) Samantha Stosur	51.7	58
2	(Belgium) Kim Clijsters	50.4	41
3	(Belgium) Justine Henin	50.4	39
4	(Italy) Roberta Vinci	50.1	48
5	(Italy) Flavia Pennetta	49.9	67
6	(Poland) Agnieszka Radwańska	49.7	50
7	(Thailand) Tamarine Tanasugarn	49.6	23
8	(Romania) Alexandra Dulgheru	49.6	57
9	(China) Peng Shuai	49.3	27
10	(Russia) Maria Kirilenko	49.3	60

Points won returning 1st service
	Player	%	Matches
1	(Russia) Elena Dementieva	42.4	54
2	(Spain) Anabel Medina Garrigues	42.4	42
3	(Poland) Agnieszka Radwańska	42.3	50
4	(Spain) Carla Suárez Navarro	42.3	35
5	(Belarus) Victoria Azarenka	42.2	59
6	(Hungary) Ágnes Szávay	42.0	49
7	(Denmark) Caroline Wozniacki	41.7	74
8	(Russia) Vera Zvonareva	41.4	63
9	(Italy) Flavia Pennetta	41.2	67
10	(Belgium) Kim Clijsters	41.2	41

Break points converted
	Player	%	Matches
1	(United States) Melanie Oudin	58.8	39
2	(France) Virginie Razzano	54.4	29
3	(Belarus) Victoria Azarenka	52.5	59
4	(Thailand) Tamarine Tanasugarn	52.3	23
5	(Hungary) Ágnes Szávay	52.0	49
6	(Ukraine) Alona Bondarenko	51.3	43
7	(Australia) Jarmila Groth	51.3	32
8	(Russia) Elena Dementieva	51.2	54
9	(Belgium) Kim Clijsters	51.0	41
10	(Japan) Kimiko Date-Krumm	50.8	34

Return games won
	Player	%	Matches
1	(Russia) Elena Dementieva	49.4	54
2	(Belgium) Kim Clijsters	48.9	41
3	(Belarus) Victoria Azarenka	48.7	59
4	(Denmark) Caroline Wozniacki	46.1	74
5	(Poland) Agnieszka Radwańska	44.8	50
6	(Serbia) Jelena Janković	44.7	54
7	(Spain) Carla Suárez Navarro	44.5	35
8	(Italy) Flavia Pennetta	44.2	67
9	(Italy) Sara Errani	44.0	65
10	(Russia) Maria Sharapova	43.8	44

== Point distribution ==
Description	W	F	SF	QF	R16	R32	R64	R128	QLFR	Q3	Q2	Q1
Grand Slam (S)	2000	1400	900	500	280	160	100	5	60	50	40	2
Grand Slam (D)	2000	1400	900	500	280	160	5	–	48	–	–	-
WTA Tour Championships (S)	+450	+360	(230 for each round robin match won 70 for each round robin match lost)							–	–	-
WTA Tour Championships (D)	1500	1050	690	–	–	-	-	–	–	–	-	-
Premier Mandatory (96S)	1000	700	450	250	140	80	50	5	30	–	20	1
Premier Mandatory (64S)	1000	700	450	250	140	80	5	–	30	–	20	1
Premier Mandatory (28/32D)	1000	700	450	250	140	5	–	–	–	–	–	-
Premier 5 (56S)	900	620	395	225	125	70	1	–	30	–	20	1
Premier 5 (28D)	900	620	395	225	125	1	–	–	–	–	–	-
Premier (56S)	470	320	200	120	60	40	1	–	12	–	8	1
Premier (32S)	470	320	200	120	60	1	–	–	20	12	8	1
Premier (16D)	470	320	200	120	1	–	–	–	–	–	–	-
Commonwealth Bank; Tournament of Champions	375	255	180(3rd); 165(4th)	75	-	–	–	-	-	–	–	-
International (56S)	280	200	130	70	30	15	1	–	10	–	6	1
International (32S)	280	200	130	70	30	1	–	–	16	10	6	1
International (16D)	280	200	130	70	1	–	–	–	–	–	–	-

== Retirements ==
Following is a list of notable players (winners of a main tour title, and/or part of the WTA rankings top 100 (singles) or (doubles) for at least one week) who announced their retirement from professional tennis, became inactive (after not playing for more than 52 weeks), or were permanently banned from playing, during the 2010 season:

- (Russia) Elena Dementieva
- (United States) Lindsay Davenport
- (Slovakia) Janette Husárová
- (Slovenia) Katarina Srebotnik(still to compete in doubles)
- (Russia) Alina Jidkova
- (Croatia) Jelena Kostanić Tošić
- (Spain) Marta Marrero
- (France) Camille Pin
- (Spain) Virginia Ruano Pascual
- (Italy) Mara Santangelo (still to compete in doubles)
- (Czech Republic) Nicole Vaidišová
- (Paraguay) Rossana de los Ríos
- (Uzbekistan) Iroda Tulyaganova
- (Ukraine) Tatiana Perebiynis
- (United States) Laura Granville
- (Hungary) Anikó Kapros
- (China) Sun Tiantian
- (United States) Meilen Tu
- (United States) Shenay Perry

== See also ==
- 2010 ATP World Tour
- 2010 ATP Challenger Tour
- 2010 ITF Women's Circuit
- Women's Tennis Association
- International Tennis Federation
