= 2010 Brisbane International – Men's singles =

Coordinates: 27°31′30″S 153°0′26″E

Men's singles
- 2010 Brisbane International

Final
- Champion: (United States) Andy Roddick
- Runner-up: (Czech Republic) Radek Štěpánek
- Score: 7–6^{(7–2)}, 7–6^{(9–7)}

Details
- Draw: 32 (4 Q / 3 WC )
- Seeds: 8

Events
Singles	men	women
Doubles	men	women
- Brisbane International

Radek Štěpánek was the defending champion, but he lost in the final to Andy Roddick, 7–6^{(7–2)}, 7–6^{(9–7)}.

== Seeds ==
1. (United States) Andy Roddick (champion)
2. (Czech Republic) Radek Štěpánek (final)
3. (France) Gaël Monfils (semifinals)
4. (Czech Republic) Tomáš Berdych (semifinals)
5. (United States) Sam Querrey (first round)
6. (Austria) Jürgen Melzer (first round)
7. (France) Jérémy Chardy (first round)
8. (Brazil) Thomaz Bellucci (quarterfinals)

== Draw ==
Key

- Q = Qualifier
- WC = Wild card
- LL = Lucky loser
- Alt = Alternate
- ITF = ITF entry
- PR = Protected ranking
- SR = Special ranking
- SE = Special exempt
- JE = Junior exempt
- JR = Junior Accelerator Programme entrant
- CO = College Accelerator Programme entrant
- NG = Next Gen Accelerator Program entrant
- w/o = Walkover
- r = Retired
- d = Defaulted

=== Finals ===
Semifinals
1	(United States) Andy Roddick	1	6	6
4	(Czech Republic) Tomáš Berdych	6	3	4
3	(France) Gaël Monfils	2	1
2	(Czech Republic) Radek Štěpánek	6	6

Final
1	(United States) Andy Roddick	7^{7}	7^{9}
2	(Czech Republic) Radek Štěpánek	6^{2}	6^{7}

=== Top half ===
First round
1	(United States) A Roddick	7^{7}	6
(Australia) P Luczak	6^{5}	2
WC	(Australia) C Ball	7	6
(Germany) M Zverev	5	1
(France) R Gasquet	6	4	6
(Finland) J Nieminen	3	6	4
Q	(Australia) M Ebden	7	6
6	(Austria) J Melzer	5	1
4	(Czech Republic) T Berdych	6	6
Q	(Australia) N Lindahl	2	4
(United States) M Fish	5	5
(Cyprus) M Baghdatis	7	7
(France) M Llodra	2	0
(Israel) H Levy	6	6
(Argentina) JI Chela	3	6	1
8	(Brazil) T Bellucci	6	3	6

Second round
1	(United States) A Roddick	7^{7}	6
WC	(Australia) C Ball	6^{0}	3
(France) R Gasquet	6	6
Q	(Australia) M Ebden	3	4
4	(Czech Republic) T Berdych	6	6
(Cyprus) M Baghdatis	0	1
(Israel) H Levy	4	6	4
8	(Brazil) T Bellucci	6	4	6

Quarterfinals
1	(United States) A Roddick	6	7^{7}
(France) R Gasquet	3	6^{5}
4	(Czech Republic) T Berdych	7^{7}	2	7^{7}
8	(Brazil) T Bellucci	6^{4}	6	6^{3}

Semifinals
1	(United States) A Roddick	1	6	6
4	(Czech Republic) T Berdych	6	3	4

=== Bottom half ===
First round
5	(United States) S Querrey	6	3	4
(United States) J Blake	4	6	6
(France) M Gicquel	6	6
(Germany) P Petzschner	3	1
(France) F Serra	6^{3}	7^{7}	7
Q	(Germany) J Reister	7^{7}	6^{5}	5
(United States) T Dent	6^{1}	7^{7}	2
3	(France) G Monfils	7^{7}	6^{5}	6
7	(France) J Chardy	4	4
(Colombia) A Falla	6	6
(France) A Clément	4	6^{2}
(United States) W Odesnik	6	7^{7}
WC	(Australia) B Tomic	4	4
Q	(Ukraine) O Dolgopolov Jr.	6	6
WC	(Australia) J Millman	4	0
2	(Czech Republic) R Štěpánek	6	6

Second round
(United States) J Blake	6	3	7^{10}
(France) M Gicquel	3	6	6^{8}
(France) F Serra	7^{7}	6^{5}	1
3	(France) G Monfils	6^{5}	7^{7}	6
(Colombia) A Falla	7^{10}	2	1
(United States) W Odesnik	6^{8}	6	6
Q	(Ukraine) O Dolgopolov Jr.	7	6^{4}	2
2	(Czech Republic) R Štěpánek	5	7^{7}	6

Quarterfinals
(United States) J Blake	6	3	4
3	(France) G Monfils	3	6	6
(United States) W Odesnik	6^{2}	1
2	(Czech Republic) R Štěpánek	7^{7}	6

Semifinals
3	(France) G Monfils	2	1
2	(Czech Republic) R Štěpánek	6	6

== Qualifying ==
The top six seeds received byes into the second round.

=== Seeds ===
1. (Belgium) Xavier Malisse (qualifying competition)
2. (Ukraine) Alexandr Dolgopolov (qualified)
3. (Germany) Julian Reister (qualified)
4. (Australia) Marinko Matosevic (qualifying competition)
5. (United Kingdom) Brydan Klein (second round)
6. (Italy) Andrea Stoppini (second round)
7. (Australia) Greg Jones (second round)
8. (Australia) Nick Lindahl (qualified)

=== Qualifiers ===
1. (Australia) Nick Lindahl
2. (Ukraine) Alexandr Dolgopolov
3. (Germany) Julian Reister
4. (Australia) Matthew Ebden

=== Draw ===
==== First qualifier ====
First round
(Australia) Matheson Klein	6	6
WC	(Australia) Mark Richards	1	0
(Australia) Benjamin Mitchell	4	2
(Australia) Joel Lindner	6	6
(Germany) Tobias Kamke	6^{6}	6^{6}
8	(Australia) Nick Lindahl	7^{8}	7^{8}

Second round
1	(Belgium) Xavier Malisse	7	6
(Australia) Matheson Klein	5	3
(Australia) Joel Lindner	7^{7}	3	4
8	(Australia) Nick Lindahl	6^{5}	6	6

Qualifying competition
1	(Belgium) Xavier Malisse	1	6^{2}
8	(Australia) Nick Lindahl	6	7^{7}

==== Second qualifier ====
First round
(Czech Republic) Lukáš Dlouhý	6	5	6^{2}
(Australia) Joseph Sirianni	4	7	7^{7}
WC	(Australia) Andrew Mcleod	0	4
(Australia) Kaden Hensel	6	6
(Australia) Sadik Kadir	5	2
7	(Australia) Greg Jones	7	6

Second round
2	(Ukraine) Alexandr Dolgopolov	7^{7}	7^{7}
(Australia) Joseph Sirianni	6^{5}	6^{3}
(Australia) Kaden Hensel	7^{9}	2	6
7	(Australia) Greg Jones	6^{7}	6	1

Qualifying competition
2	(Ukraine) Alexandr Dolgopolov	7^{7}	6
(Australia) Kaden Hensel	6^{1}	3

==== Third qualifier ====
First round					Second round					Qualifying competition
					3	(Germany) Julian Reister	6	6
(Australia) Maverick Banes		7^{7}	5	4		(Australia) Miles Armstrong	2	3
(Australia) Miles Armstrong		6^{4}	7	6						3	(Germany) Julian Reister	6^{7}	6	7
WC	(Australia) Jason Kubler	0	3								(Australia) Matt Reid	7^{9}	1	5
	(Australia) Matt Reid	6	6			(Australia) Matt Reid	6	3	6
					6	(Italy) Andrea Stoppini	2	6	2

==== Fourth qualifier ====
First round				Second round				Qualifying competition
				4	(Australia) Marinko Matosevic	7^{7}	6
WC	(Australia) Jarryd Chaplin	3	4		(Australia) Sam Groth	6^{4}	3
	(Australia) Sam Groth	6	6					4	(Australia) Marinko Matosevic	2	2
(Australia) Isaac Frost		2	2						(Australia) Matthew Ebden	6	6
(Australia) Matthew Ebden		6	6		(Australia) Matthew Ebden	6	6
				5	(United Kingdom) Brydan Klein	4	0
