= Clijsters–Henin rivalry =

Tennis rivalry

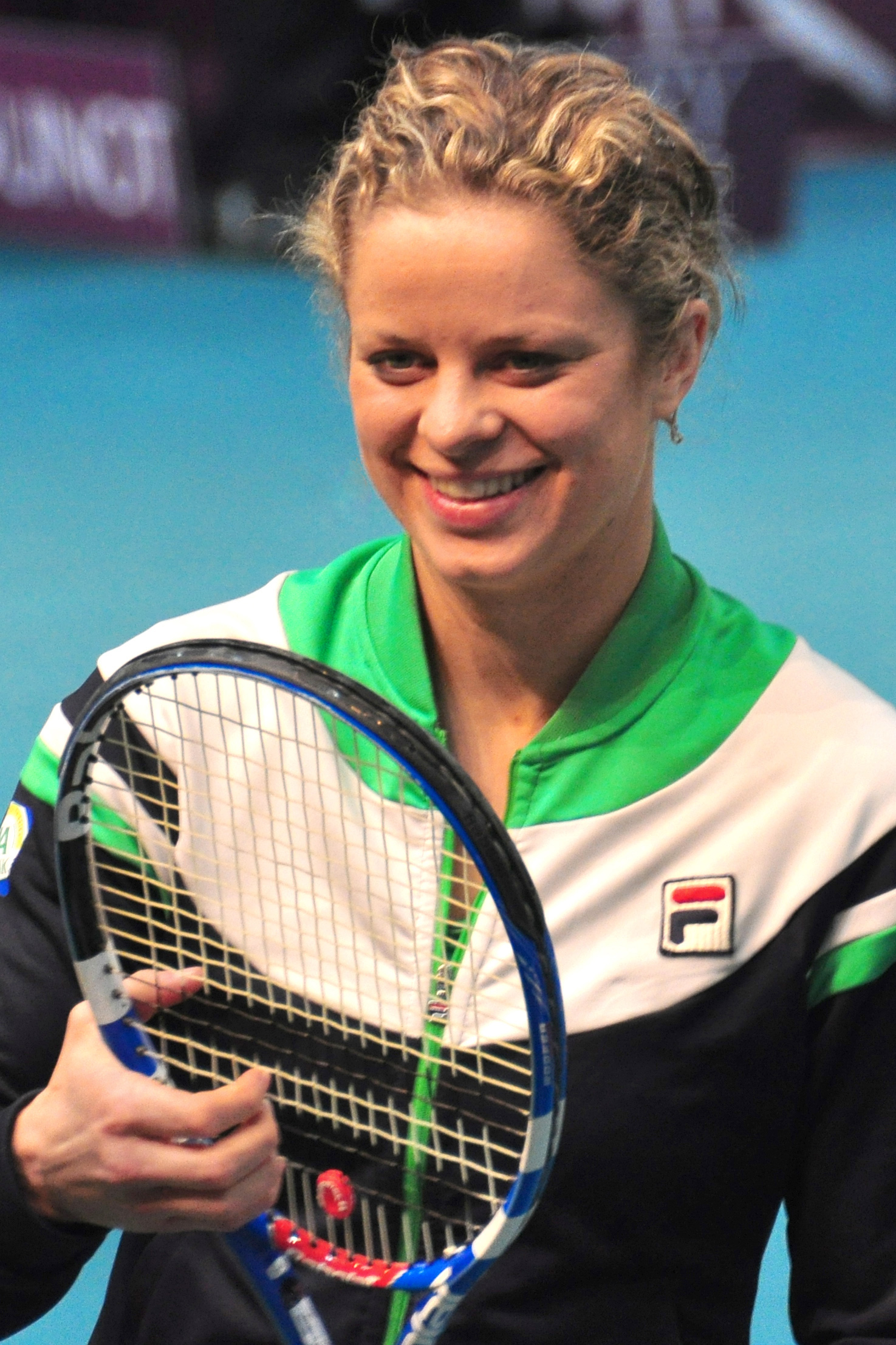
Kim Clijsters

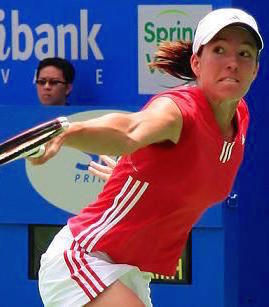
Justine Henin

The Clijsters–Henin rivalry was a tennis rivalry between Kim Clijsters and Justine Henin. The two Belgians met 25 times between 1998 and 2010, with eight taking place in a major tournament. Their overall head-to-head was 13–12 favoring Clijsters, but Henin led 5–3 at the majors, including winning all three of their major finals.

== History of the rivalry ==
They first met in 1998 with Henin winning in Ramat HaSharon. 2001 was a historic year for the pair. Their first match was decided in the final set at Indian Wells in the third round which Clijsters won. At the French Open the tournament witnessed Clijsters and Henin facing off in the semifinals, where the winner would become Belgium's first ever singles Grand Slam finalist. Clijsters won the match in three sets before losing to Jennifer Capriati in the final. Just two weeks later though Henin beat Clijsters in three sets to win the Heineken Open. In November the pair teamed up to bring Belgium its first success in the Fed Cup competition.

Clijsters won in straight sets in both Sydney and the Australian Open quarterfinals at the start of 2002. Henin won only her second match in six meetings against Clijsters in the semifinals of Rome. In their final match of 2002 at the WTA Championships, Clijsters lost just three games to Henin.

At the Adidas International in the first of eight matches between the pair in 2003, Clijsters saw off Hénin-Hardenne in straight sets to reach the final against Lindsay Davenport, which Clijsters won. The pair's next meeting came in the semifinals of their home event, the Proximus Diamond Games, with Clijsters again winning in straight sets before falling to Venus Williams in the final. Hénin-Hardenne hit back to win her first match of the year against Clijsters in Berlin. As Clijsters wasted three match points as Henin won the match in the final set 7–5. Henin then squared the series up for the year as she lost just four games to Clijsters as she won the French Open. Just two weeks later Clijsters stopped the two-match losing streak as Henin retired from the final of the Ordina Open. The pair's next meeting was at the Acura Classic with Henin fighting back from a set down to defeat her compatriot. Henin went on to claim her second Grand Slam title of the year, defeating Clijsters in straight sets at the US Open. In their final match of the year the World Number One was at stake as they faced off in Germany. Clijsters was the reigning World Number One and claimed it as she defeated Henin, coming from a set down to do so.

The Belgians met just once in 2004 and 2005, at the opening Grand Slam Tournament of 2004, the Australian Open. Again it was in the final and again Henin triumphed in the final set. It was a year and a half before they met again, this time in the final of the Rogers Cup, and Clijsters defeated Henin-Hardenne, whilst in the middle of a 22-match winning streak. The rivalry came to an end in 2006 as Clijsters retired in 2007, but not before three more matches were played. 2006 witnessed Henin defeating Clijsters in all three matches. Henin won in straight sets at the French Open and at Wimbledon, but needed three sets to get rid of her rival at Eastbourne. Wimbledon was the last match they played and it left Henin winning the series by 12 matches to 10. Also in 2006 Clijsters and Henin guided their nation to the final of the Fed Cup where they lost. Clijsters and Henin only played in the first round together; all other rounds Kirsten Flipkens played, partnering Clijsters in the semifinals and Henin in the final.

Henin then followed suit and retired in 2008, but in 2009, Clijsters came out of retirement and Henin followed for the start of the 2010 season, reigniting the rivalry. Henin met Clijsters in the final at Brisbane in her first tournament back, which Clijsters finally won in the final set tiebreak. They then met in Miami and shared another match which went to the final set tie-break again. Clijsters then defeated Henin in three sets at the fourth round of the 2010 Wimbledon Championships, while Henin injured her elbow during the first set, as Clijsters took the renewed rivalry score to 3–0. The pair considered putting their fierce rivalry aside to compete together in doubles at the 2012 Olympic Games; but the rivalry ended when Henin retired once again, this time on doctors' advice because of the elbow injury sustained against Clijsters at Wimbledon, after playing the 2011 Australian Open, leaving the final head-to-head 13–12 in Clijsters' favour. The pair's final match together was an exhibition in Antwerp in December 2010 with Clijsters winning a match tiebreaker.

During the height of their rivalry in 2003, Clijsters openly accused Henin in media of poor sportsmanship and taking advantage by asking for a medical treatment when Henin was behind in their tennis matches. Clijsters stated that Henin often faked her injuries to distract her opponents. In 2011, after her second retirement, Henin talked about the controversial moment during their 2004 Australian Open final, when a Clijsters' forehand swing volley on break point at 3-4 in the third set was incorrectly overruled.

== Head-to-head ==
Legend (1998–2008)	Legend (2009–present)	Clijsters	Henin
Grand Slam	Grand Slam	3	5
WTA Tour Championships	WTA Finals	3	2
WTA Tier I	WTA Premier Mandatory	3	2
WTA Tier II	WTA Premier 5	4	2
WTA Tier III	WTA Premier	1	1
WTA Tier IV	WTA International	1	2
Total		13	12

Clijsters–Henin (13–12)

No.	Year	Tournament	Tier	Surface	Round	Winner	Score	Clijsters	Henin
1.	1998	Ramat HaSharon	Tier IV	Hard	Quarterfinals	Henin	6–1, 7–6^{(7–3)}	0	1
2.	1999	Reims	Tier IV	Clay	Final	Henin	6–4, 6–4	0	2
3.	2001	Indian Wells Masters	Tier I	Hard	Round of 32	Clijsters	1–6, 6–4, 6–3	1	2
4.	2001	Roland Garros	Grand Slam	Clay	Semifinals	Clijsters	2–6, 7–5, 6–3	2	2
5.	2001	Rosmalen Grass Court Championships	Tier III	Grass	Final	Henin	6–4, 3–6, 6–3	2	3
6.	2002	Sydney International	Tier II	Hard	Quarterfinals	Clijsters	7–6^{(7–5)}, 6–2	3	3
7.	2002	Australian Open	Grand Slam	Hard	Quarterfinals	Clijsters	6–2, 6–3	4	3
8.	2002	Italian Open	Tier I	Clay	Semifinals	Henin	7–5, 6–2	4	4
9.	2002	WTA Tour Championships	Tour Finals	Carpet	Quarterfinals	Clijsters	6–2, 6–1	5	4
10.	2003	Sydney International	Tier II	Hard	Semifinals	Clijsters	6–2, 6–3	6	4
11.	2003	Diamond Games	Tier II	Carpet	Semifinals	Clijsters	6–2, 7–6^{(7–3)}	7	4
12.	2003	German Open	Tier I	Clay	Final	Henin	6–4, 4–6, 7–5	7	5
13.	2003	Roland Garros	Grand Slam	Clay	Final	Henin	6–0, 6–4	7	6
14.	2003	Rosmalen Grass Court Championships	Tier III	Grass	Final	Clijsters	6–7^{(4–7)}, 3–0 RET	8	6
15.	2003	Southern California Open	Tier II	Hard	Final	Henin	3–6, 6–2, 6–3	8	7
16.	2003	US Open	Grand Slam	Hard	Final	Henin	7–5, 6–1	8	8
17.	2003	Stuttgart Open	Tier II	Hard (i)	Final	Clijsters	5–7, 6–4, 6–2	9	8
18.	2004	Australian Open	Grand Slam	Hard	Final	Henin	6–3, 4–6, 6–3	9	9
19.	2005	Canadian Open	Tier I	Hard	Final	Clijsters	7–5, 6–1	10	9
20.	2006	Roland Garros	Grand Slam	Clay	Semifinals	Henin	6–3, 6–2	10	10
21.	2006	Eastbourne International	Tier II	Grass	Semifinals	Henin	6–3, 5–7, 6–1	10	11
22.	2006	Wimbledon	Grand Slam	Grass	Semifinals	Henin	6–4, 7–6^{(7–4)}	10	12
23.	2010	Brisbane International	International	Hard	Final	Clijsters	6–3, 4–6, 7–6^{(8–6)}	11	12
24.	2010	Miami Open	Premier Mandatory	Hard	Semifinals	Clijsters	6–2, 6–7^{(3–7)}, 7–6^{(8–6)}	12	12
25.	2010	Wimbledon	Grand Slam	Grass	Round of 16	Clijsters	2–6, 6–2, 6–3	13	12

== Breakdown of the rivalry ==
- Hard courts: Clijsters, 8–4
- Clay courts: Henin, 5–1
- Grass courts: Henin, 3–2
- Indoor carpet: Clijsters, 2–0
- Grand Slam matches: Henin, 5–3
- Grand Slam finals: Henin, 3–0
- Year-End Championships matches: Clijsters, 1–0
- Year-End Championships finals: None
- Fed Cup matches: None; they were unable to play each other in a Fed Cup match because they both represented Belgium.
- All finals: Henin, 7–4

== WTA rankings ==
=== Year-end ranking timeline ===
Player	1996	1997	1998	1999	2000	2001	2002	2003	2004	2005	2006	2007	2008	2009	2010	2011	2012
(Belgium) Kim Clijsters			409	47	18	5	4	2	22	2	5			18	3	13	
(Belgium) Justine Henin			226	69	45	7	5	1	8	6	1	1			12		

== See also ==
- List of tennis rivalries
