= 2010 Brisbane International – Men's doubles =

Coordinates: 27°31′30″S 153°0′26″E

Men's doubles
- 2010 Brisbane International

Final
- Champions: (France) Jérémy Chardy; (France) Marc Gicquel
- Runners-up: (Czech Republic) Lukáš Dlouhý; (India) Leander Paes
- Score: 6–3, 7–6^{(7–5)}

Events
Singles	men	women
Doubles	men	women
- Brisbane International

Marc Gicquel and Jo-Wilfried Tsonga were the defending champions, but Tsonga chose not to participate that year.
Gicquel partnered with Jérémy Chardy, and won in the final against Lukáš Dlouhý and Leander Paes, 6–3, 7–6^{(7–5)}.

== Seeds ==
1. (Czech Republic) Lukáš Dlouhý / (India) Leander Paes (final)
2. (Austria) Julian Knowle / (Sweden) Robert Lindstedt (first round)
3. (France) Michaël Llodra / (Israel) Andy Ram (quarterfinals)
4. (Brazil) Marcelo Melo / (Brazil) Bruno Soares (quarterfinals)

== Draw ==
Key

- Q = Qualifier
- WC = Wild card
- LL = Lucky loser
- Alt = Alternate
- ITF = ITF entry
- PR = Protected ranking
- SR = Special ranking
- SE = Special exempt
- JE = Junior exempt
- JR = Junior Accelerator Programme entrant
- CO = College Accelerator Programme entrant
- NG = Next Gen Accelerator Program entrant
- w/o = Walkover
- r = Retired
- d = Defaulted

=== Draw ===
First round

Quarterfinals

Semifinals

Final

1
(Czech Republic) L Dlouhý
(India) L Paes
7
6

- (Australia) C Ball
- (United States) S Querrey
5
3

1
(Czech Republic) L Dlouhý
(India) L Paes
w/o

(Australia) A Fisher
(Australia) S Huss
4
6
[10]

- (Australia) A Fisher
- (Australia) S Huss

WC
- (Australia) K Hensel
- (Australia) B Tomic
6
3
[6]

1
(Czech Republic) L Dlouhý
(India) L Paes
6
0
[10]

3
(France) M Llodra
(Israel) A Ram
3
6
[10]

- (Austria) J Melzer
- (Germany) P Petzschner
4
6
[7]

WC
- (Australia) P Luczak
- (Australia) J Sirianni
6
4
[7]

3
- (France) M Llodra
- (Israel) A Ram
7
2
[8]

(Austria) J Melzer
(Germany) P Petzschner
6
6

(Austria) J Melzer
(Germany) P Petzschner
5
6
[10]

- (Czech Republic) M Damm
- (Slovakia) F Polášek
2
2

1
- (Czech Republic) L Dlouhý
- (India) L Paes
3
6^{5}

(United States) J Blake
(United States) A Roddick
6
6

(France) J Chardy
(France) M Gicquel
6
7^{7}

- (Czech Republic) J Levinský
- (United States) T Parrott
2
3

(United States) J Blake
(United States) A Roddick
7^{7}
6

- (United Kingdom) R Hutchins
- (Australia) J Kerr
2
4

4
- (Brazil) M Melo
- (Brazil) B Soares
6^{3}
4

4
(Brazil) M Melo
(Brazil) B Soares
6
6

- (United States) J Blake
- (United States) A Roddick
4
6
[11]

(Czech Republic) T Berdych
(Czech Republic) R Štěpánek
6
6

(France) J Chardy
(France) M Gicquel
6
3
[13]

- (Brazil) T Bellucci
- (Australia) P Hanley
1
4

- (Czech Republic) T Berdych
- (Czech Republic) R Štěpánek
5
4

(France) J Chardy
(France) M Gicquel
3
7^{7}
[10]

- (France) J Chardy
- (France) M Gicquel
7
6

2
- (Austria) J Knowle
- (Sweden) R Lindstedt
6
6^{4}
[4]
