= 2010 Brisbane International =

Coordinates: 27°31′30″S 153°0′26″E

- Date: 3–10 January 2010
- Edition: 2nd
- Surface: Hard / outdoor
- Location: Brisbane, Australia
- Venue: Queensland Tennis Centre

Champions

Men's singles
- (United States) Andy Roddick

Women's singles
- (Belgium) Kim Clijsters

Men's doubles
- (France) Jérémy Chardy / (France) Marc Gicquel

Women's doubles
- (Czech Republic) Andrea Hlaváčková / (Czech Republic) Lucie Hradecká
- Brisbane International

The 2010 Brisbane International was a joint ATP and WTA tennis tournament played on outdoor hard courts in Brisbane, Queensland. It was the 2nd edition of the tournament and was played at the Queensland Tennis Centre in Tennyson. The centre court, Pat Rafter Arena is named in honour of Australian tennis hero Patrick Rafter. It took place from 3 to 10 January 2010. It was part of the Australian Open Series in preparation for the first Grand Slam of the year. Justine Henin has announced that she will make her return to professional tennis at the 2010 Brisbane International.

Television coverage of the tournament was on Channel Seven, with live coverage of the day sessions and delayed coverage of the night sessions between 4 and 10 January.

== Finals ==
=== Men's singles ===
(United States) Andy Roddick defeated (Czech Republic) Radek Štěpánek, 7–6^{(7–2)}, 7–6^{(9–7)}.

- It was Roddick's first title of the year and 28th overall.

=== Women's singles ===
(Belgium) Kim Clijsters defeated (Belgium) Justine Henin, 6–3, 4–6, 7–6^{(8–6)}.

- It was Clijsters' first title of the year and 36th of her career.

=== Men's doubles ===
(France) Jérémy Chardy / (France) Marc Gicquel defeated (Czech Republic) Lukáš Dlouhý / (India) Leander Paes, 6–3, 7–6^{(7–5)}.

=== Women's doubles ===
(Czech Republic) Andrea Hlaváčková / (Czech Republic) Lucie Hradecká defeated (Hungary) Melinda Czink / (Spain) Arantxa Parra Santonja, 2–6, 7–6^{(7–3)}, [10–4]

== ATP entrants ==
=== Seeds ===
| Country | Player | Rank^{1} | Seed |
|---|---|---|---|
| USA | Andy Roddick | 7 | 1 |
| CZE | Radek Štěpánek | 12 | 2 |
| FRA | Gaël Monfils | 13 | 3 |
| CZE | Tomáš Berdych | 20 | 4 |
| USA | Sam Querrey | 25 | 5 |
| AUT | Jürgen Melzer | 28 | 6 |
| FRA | Jérémy Chardy | 32 | 7 |
| BRA | Thomaz Bellucci | 36 | 8 |

- Rankings are as of 28 December 2009.

=== Other entrants ===
The following players received wildcards into the singles main draw:

- (Australia) Carsten Ball
- (Australia) John Millman
- (Australia) Bernard Tomic

The following players received entry from the qualifying draw:

- (Ukraine) Oleksandr Dolgopolov Jr.
- (Australia) Matthew Ebden
- (Australia) Nick Lindahl
- (Germany) Julian Reister

== WTA entrants ==
=== Seeds ===
| Country | Player | Rank^{1} | Seed |
|---|---|---|---|
| BEL | Kim Clijsters | 18 | 1 |
| RUS | Nadia Petrova | 20 | 2 |
| SRB | Ana Ivanovic | 21 | 3 |
| SVK | Daniela Hantuchová | 24 | 4 |
| RUS | Alisa Kleybanova | 29 | 5 |
| CAN | Aleksandra Wozniak | 34 | 6 |
| HUN | Melinda Czink | 37 | 7 |
| CZE | Iveta Benešová | 38 | 8 |

- Rankings as of 28 December 2009.

=== Other entrants ===
The following players received wildcards into the singles main draw:

- (Australia) Casey Dellacqua
- (Belgium) Justine Henin
- (Australia) Alicia Molik

The following players received entry from the qualifying draw:

- (Russia) Ekaterina Ivanova
- (Kazakhstan) Sesil Karatantcheva
- (Russia) Alla Kudryavtseva
- (Kazakhstan) Galina Voskoboeva
