= 2010 Brisbane International – Women's singles =

Coordinates: 27°31′30″S 153°0′26″E

Women's singles
- 2010 Brisbane International

Final
- Champion: (Belgium) Kim Clijsters
- Runner-up: (Belgium) Justine Henin
- Score: 6–3, 4–6, 7–6^{(8–6)}

Details
- Draw: 32
- Seeds: 8

Events
Singles	men	women
Doubles	men	women
- Brisbane International

Victoria Azarenka was the defending champion, but chose not to participate this year.

Kim Clijsters won in the final 6–3, 4–6, 7–6^{(8–6)}, against her compatriot Justine Henin, saving two match points in the third set. The tournament marked Henin's return after her first retirement.

== Seeds ==
1. (Belgium) Kim Clijsters (champion)
2. (Russia) Nadia Petrova (first round)
3. (Serbia) Ana Ivanovic (semifinals)
4. (Slovakia) Daniela Hantuchová (quarterfinals)
5. (Russia) Alisa Kleybanova (first round)
6. (Canada) Aleksandra Wozniak (second round)
7. (Hungary) Melinda Czink (quarterfinals)
8. (Czech Republic) Iveta Benešová (first round)

== Draw ==
Key

- Q = Qualifier
- WC = Wild card
- LL = Lucky loser
- Alt = Alternate
- ITF = ITF entry
- PR = Protected ranking
- SR = Special ranking
- SE = Special exempt
- JE = Junior exempt
- JR = Junior Accelerator Programme entrant
- CO = College Accelerator Programme entrant
- NG = Next Gen Accelerator Program entrant
- w/o = Walkover
- r = Retired
- d = Defaulted

=== Finals ===
Semifinals
1	(Belgium) Kim Clijsters	6	6
(Germany) Andrea Petkovic	4	2
3	(Serbia) Ana Ivanovic	3	2
WC	(Belgium) Justine Henin	6	6

Final
1	(Belgium) Kim Clijsters	6	4	7^{8}
WC	(Belgium) Justine Henin	3	6	6^{6}

=== Top half ===
First round
1	(Belgium) K Clijsters	6	6
(Italy) T Garbin	2	1
WC	(Australia) A Molik	6	1	6
(Russia) E Makarova	4	6	4
(Czech Republic) L Šafářová	6^{5}	6	6
(Germany) A-L Grönefeld	7	4	1
Q	(Kazakhstan) G Voskoboeva	2	2
6	(Canada) A Wozniak	6	6
4	(Slovakia) D Hantuchová	6	6^{5}	6
Q	(Russia) E Ivanova	1	7	1
(China) S Peng	7	4	2
(Hungary) Á Szávay	5	6	6
(Austria) S Bammer	4	1
(United States) V King	6	6
(Germany) A Petkovic	6^{6}	6	6
8	(Czech Republic) I Benešová	7	2	1

Second round
1	(Belgium) K Clijsters	6	6
WC	(Australia) A Molik	0	3
(Czech Republic) L Šafářová	6	6
6	(Canada) A Wozniak	3	1
4	(Slovakia) D Hantuchová	6	6
(Hungary) Á Szávay	3	1
(United States) V King	6	2	1
(Germany) A Petkovic	4	6	6

Quarterfinals
1	(Belgium) K Clijsters	6	0	6
(Czech Republic) L Šafářová	1	6	4
4	(Slovakia) D Hantuchová	4	2
(Germany) A Petkovic	6	6

Semifinals
1	(Belgium) K Clijsters	6	6
(Germany) A Petkovic	4	2

=== Bottom half ===
First round
5	(Russia) A Kleybanova	4	6	2
(Russia) A Pavlyuchenkova	6	2	6
(Italy) S Errani	4	6	2
(Italy) R Vinci	6	2	6
(Switzerland) T Bacsinszky	6	7
Q	(Russia) A Kudryavtseva	4	6^{3}
(Australia) J Dokić	5	6	3
3	(Serbia) A Ivanovic	7	1	6
7	(Hungary) M Czink	6	3	6
(Czech Republic) L Hradecká	4	6	3
(Belarus) O Govortsova	4	1
(Czech Republic) B Záhlavová-Strýcová	6	6
WC	(Australia) C Dellacqua	2	6	6^{1}
Q	(Kazakhstan) S Karatantcheva	6	0	7
WC	(Belgium) J Henin	7	7
2	(Russia) N Petrova	5	5

Second round
(Russia) A Pavlyuchenkova	1	6	6
(Italy) R Vinci	6	4	1
(Switzerland) T Bacsinszky	2	6	4
3	(Serbia) A Ivanovic	6	2	6
7	(Hungary) M Czink	6	2	6
(Czech Republic) B Záhlavová-Strýcová	3	6	1
Q	(Kazakhstan) S Karatantcheva	4	3
WC	(Belgium) J Henin	6	6

Quarterfinals
(Russia) A Pavlyuchenkova	2	6^{6}
3	(Serbia) A Ivanovic	6	7
7	(Hungary) M Czink	2	6	6^{5}
WC	(Belgium) J Henin	6	3	7

Semifinals
3	(Serbia) A Ivanovic	3	2
WC	(Belgium) J Henin	6	6
