= 2010 Brisbane International – Women's doubles =

Coordinates: 27°31′30″S 153°0′26″E

Women's doubles
- 2010 Brisbane International

Final
- Champions: (Czech Republic) Andrea Hlaváčková (Czech Republic) Lucie Hradecká
- Runners-up: (Hungary) Melinda Czink (Spain) Arantxa Parra Santonja
- Score: 2–6, 7–6(3), 10–4

Events
Singles	men	women
Doubles	men	women
- Brisbane International

Anna-Lena Grönefeld and Vania King were the defending champions, but they lost to Timea Bacsinszky and Tathiana Garbin in the first round.

Andrea Hlaváčková and Lucie Hradecká won in the final 2–6, 7–6(3), 10–4, against Melinda Czink and Arantxa Parra Santonja.

== Seeds ==
1. (Russia) Alla Kudryavtseva / (Russia) Ekaterina Makarova (first round)
2. (Germany) Anna-Lena Grönefeld / (United States) Vania King (first round)
3. (Uzbekistan) Akgul Amanmuradova / (Chinese Taipei) Chan Yung-jan (semifinals)
4. (Poland) Klaudia Jans / (Poland) Alicja Rosolska (first round)

== Draw ==
Key

- Q = Qualifier
- WC = Wild card
- LL = Lucky loser
- Alt = Alternate
- ITF = ITF entry
- PR = Protected ranking
- SR = Special ranking
- SE = Special exempt
- JE = Junior exempt
- JR = Junior Accelerator Programme entrant
- CO = College Accelerator Programme entrant
- NG = Next Gen Accelerator Program entrant
- w/o = Walkover
- r = Retired
- d = Defaulted

=== Draw ===
First round
1	(Russia) A Kudryavtseva (Russia) E Makarova	6	4	[8]
(Belarus) O Govortsova (Belarus) T Poutchek	4	6	[10]
(Latvia) L Dekmeijere (Turkey) İ Şenoğlu	6	2	[6]
(Czech Republic) A Hlaváčková (Czech Republic) L Hradecká	3	6	[10]
3	(Uzbekistan) A Amanmuradova (Chinese Taipei) Y-j Chan	2	6	[12]
(Czech Republic) I Benešová (Italy) S Errani	6	3	[10]
WC	(Australia) J Moore (Australia) S Peers	2	5
(Russia) A Pavlyuchenkova (Kazakhstan) G Voskoboeva	6	7
WC	(Australia) C Dellacqua (Australia) A Molik	4	2
(Ukraine) M Koryttseva (Belarus) D Kustova	6	6
(Hungary) M Czink (Spain) A Parra Santonja	6	6
4	(Poland) K Jans (Poland) A Rosolska	4	1
(Hungary) Á Szávay (Italy) R Vinci	1	1
(Australia) A Rodionova (Russia) Ar Rodionova	6	6
(Switzerland) T Bacsinszky (Italy) T Garbin	7	4	[12]
2	(Germany) A-L Grönefeld (United States) V King	5	6	[10]

Quarterfinals
(Belarus) O Govortsova (Belarus) T Poutchek	6^{2}	2
(Czech Republic) A Hlaváčková (Czech Republic) L Hradecká	7	6
3	(Uzbekistan) A Amanmuradova (Chinese Taipei) Y-j Chan	6	6
(Russia) A Pavlyuchenkova (Kazakhstan) G Voskoboeva	2	1
(Ukraine) M Koryttseva (Belarus) D Kustova	5	6	[10]
(Hungary) M Czink (Spain) A Parra Santonja	7	4	[12]
(Australia) A Rodionova (Russia) Ar Rodionova	7	6
(Switzerland) T Bacsinszky (Italy) T Garbin	5	0

Semifinals
(Czech Republic) A Hlaváčková (Czech Republic) L Hradecká	2	6	[10]
3	(Uzbekistan) A Amanmuradova (Chinese Taipei) Y-j Chan	6	4	[7]
(Hungary) M Czink (Spain) A Parra Santonja	6	6
(Australia) A Rodionova (Russia) Ar Rodionova	2	1

Finals
(Czech Republic) A Hlaváčková (Czech Republic) L Hradecká	2	7	[10]
(Hungary) M Czink (Spain) A Parra Santonja	6	6^{3}	[4]
