= 2010 UNICEF Open – Women's singles =

Women's singles
- 2010 UNICEF Open

Final
- Champion: (Belgium) Justine Henin
- Runner-up: (Germany) Andrea Petkovic
- Score: 3–6, 6–3, 6–4

Details
- Draw: 32 (4 Q / 3 WC )
- Seeds: 8

Events
Singles	men	women
Doubles	men	women
← 2009 ·	UNICEF Open	· 2011 →

Tamarine Tanasugarn was the defending champion, but she lost against Anastasia Rodionova in the first round. Top seed Justine Henin won the final 3–6, 6–3, 6–4 against Andrea Petkovic.

== Seeds ==
1. (Belgium) Justine Henin (champion)
2. (Russia) Dinara Safina (first round)
3. (Russia) Maria Kirilenko (second round, retired due to abdominal injury)
4. (Kazakhstan) Yaroslava Shvedova (quarterfinals)
5. (Romania) Alexandra Dulgheru (semifinals)
6. (Italy) Sara Errani (first round)
7. (Germany) Andrea Petkovic (final)
8. (Spain) Anabel Medina Garrigues (first round)

== Draw ==
=== Key ===
- Q = Qualifier
- WC = Wild card
- LL = Lucky loser
- Alt = Alternate
- ITF = ITF entry
- PR = Protected ranking
- SR = Special ranking
- SE = Special exempt
- JE = Junior exempt
- JR = Junior Accelerator Programme entrant
- CO = College Accelerator Programme entrant
- NG = Next Gen Accelerator Program entrant
- w/o = Walkover
- r = Retired
- d = Defaulted

=== Finals ===
Semifinals
1/WC	(Belgium) Justine Henin	6	6
5	(Romania) Alexandra Dulgheru	2	2
(Belgium) Kirsten Flipkens	7	6^{2}	4
7	(Germany) Andrea Petkovic	6^{3}	7	6

Final
1/WC	(Belgium) Justine Henin	3	6	6
7	(Germany) Andrea Petkovic	6	3	4

=== Top half ===
First round
1/WC	(Belgium) J Henin	6	6
(Germany) A Kerber	4	2
(Czech Republic) B Záhlavová-Strýcová	4	6^{5}
(Italy) R Vinci	6	7
(Hungary) M Czink	5	2
(Germany) K Barrois	7	6
(Austria) S Bammer	6	6
6	(Italy) S Errani	1	3
4	(Kazakhstan) Y Shvedova	6	6
Q	(Spain) A Parra Santonja	1	2
Q	(Australia) A Rodionova	1	7	6
(Thailand) T Tanasugarn	6	6^{5}	3
(Italy) A Brianti	6	4	4
(Russia) A Kudryavtseva	3	6	6
Q	(France) J Coin	6	6^{4}	6^{4}
5	(Romania) A Dulgheru	4	7	7

Second round
1/WC	(Belgium) J Henin	6	6
(Italy) R Vinci	3	3
(Germany) K Barrois	3	6	6
(Austria) S Bammer	6	2	3
4	(Kazakhstan) Y Shvedova	2	6	6
Q	(Australia) A Rodionova	6	3	2
(Russia) A Kudryavtseva	3	6	2
5	(Romania) A Dulgheru	6	2	6

Quarterfinals
1/WC	(Belgium) J Henin	7	6
(Germany) K Barrois	5	3
4	(Kazakhstan) Y Shvedova	6	3	4
5	(Romania) A Dulgheru	3	6	6

Semifinals
1/WC	(Belgium) J Henin	6	6
5	(Romania) A Dulgheru	2	2

=== Bottom half ===
First round
8	(Spain) A Medina Garrigues	6	2	3
WC	(Netherlands) A Rus	4	6	6
WC	(United Kingdom) L Robson	3	4
(Slovakia) D Cibulková	6	6
(Belgium) K Flipkens	6	6
(United States) V King	1	2
(Romania) IR Olaru	4	1
3	(Russia) M Kirilenko	6	6
7	(Germany) A Petkovic	6	7
(Czech Republic) P Kvitová	3	6^{6}
(Sweden) S Arvidsson	6	0	1
(Serbia) A Ivanovic	4	6	6
Q	(Czech Republic) S Záhlavová	7	6
(Russia) E Vesnina	5	2
(Slovakia) M Rybáriková	6^{4}	6	6
2	(Russia) D Safina	7	4	4

Second round
WC	(Netherlands) A Rus	2	5
(Slovakia) D Cibulková	6	7
(Belgium) K Flipkens	6	3
3	(Russia) M Kirilenko	3	3	r
7	(Germany) A Petkovic	6	6^{4}	6
(Serbia) A Ivanovic	4	7	1
Q	(Czech Republic) S Záhlavová	7	4	6
(Slovakia) M Rybáriková	6^{1}	6	2

Quarterfinals
(Slovakia) D Cibulková	2	3
(Belgium) K Flipkens	6	6
7	(Germany) A Petkovic	6	7
Q	(Czech Republic) S Záhlavová	2	6^{5}

Semifinals
(Belgium) K Flipkens	7	6^{2}	4
7	(Germany) A Petkovic	6^{3}	7	6
