= 2011 UNICEF Open – Men's singles qualifying =

This article displays the qualifying draw of the 2011 UNICEF Open.

== Players ==
=== Seeds ===
1. (Colombia) Alejandro Falla (qualified)
2. (France) Florent Serra (qualifying competition)
3. (France) Arnaud Clément (qualified)
4. (Russia) Konstantin Kravchuk (qualified)
5. (Spain) Iván Navarro (qualifying competition)
6. (France) Ludovic Walter (qualified)
7. (Germany) Andre Begemann (second round)
8. (Slovakia) Miloslav Mečíř, Jr. (qualifying competition)

=== Qualifiers ===
1. (Colombia) Alejandro Falla
2. (France) Ludovic Walter
3. (France) Arnaud Clément
4. (Russia) Konstantin Kravchuk

== Qualifying draw ==
=== First qualifier ===
| First round | | | | Second round | | | | Qualifying competition |
| | | | | 1 | (Colombia) Alejandro Falla | 6 | 6 |
| WC | (Netherlands) Rogier Wassen | 6 | 7 | WC | (Netherlands) Rogier Wassen | 2 | 1 |
| | (Germany) Dominik Pfeiffer | 4 | 5 | | | | | 1 | (Colombia) Alejandro Falla | 3 | 6 | 6 |
| | (Germany) Michael Kohlmann | 6 | 7^{7} | | | | | 5 | (Spain) Iván Navarro | 6 | 4 | 3 |
| | (Japan) Takao Suzuki | 4 | 6^{4} | | (Germany) Michael Kohlmann | 2 | 5 |
| | | | | 5 | (Spain) Iván Navarro | 6 | 7 |

=== Second qualifier ===
| First round | | | | Second round | | | | Qualifying competition |
| | | | | 2 | (France) Florent Serra | 6 | 6 |
| (Switzerland) Alexander Sadecky | 6 | 1 | 6 | | (Switzerland) Alexander Sadecky | 3 | 2 |
| (Bulgaria) Alexander Lazov | 4 | 6 | 4 | | | | | 2 | (France) Florent Serra | 7 | 3 | 4 |
| (Germany) David Thurner | 6 | 1 | 6 | | | | | 6 | (France) Ludovic Walter | 6^{4} | 6 | 6 |
| (Germany) Michael Lux | 4 | 6 | 4 | | (Germany) David Thurner | 6^{6} | 1 |
| | | | | 6 | (France) Ludovic Walter | 7^{8} | 6 |

=== Third qualifier ===
| First round | | | | Second round | | | | | Qualifying competition |
| | | | | 3 | (France) Arnaud Clément | 6 | 3 | 6 |
| (Australia) Sadik Kadir | 5 | 6 | 7 | | (Australia) Sadik Kadir | 3 | 6 | 2 |
| (Switzerland) George Bastl | 7 | 3 | 5 | | | | | | 3 | (France) Arnaud Clément | 6 | 6 |
| (Australia) Rameez Junaid | 6^{4} | 1 | | | | | | | | (Austria) Alexander Peya | 2 | 3 |
| (Austria) Alexander Peya | 7^{7} | 6 | | | (Austria) Alexander Peya | 3 | 6 | 6 |
| | | | | 7 | (Germany) Andre Begemann | 6 | 3 | 3 |

=== Fourth qualifier ===
| First round | | | Second round | | | | | Qualifying competition |
| | | | 4 | (Russia) Konstantin Kravchuk | 6 | 6 |
| (Australia) Clint Thomson | 6 | 6 | | (Australia) Clint Thomson | 2 | 2 |
| (Netherlands) Romano Frantzen | 4 | 2 | | | | | | 4 | (Russia) Konstantin Kravchuk | 6 | 7^{7} |
| (Germany) Richard Waite | 2 | 4 | | | | | | 8 | (Slovakia) Miloslav Mečíř, Jr. | 4 | 6^{4} |
| (Czech Republic) František Čermák | 6 | 6 | | (Czech Republic) František Čermák | 6 | 6^{5} | 0 |
| | | | 8 | (Slovakia) Miloslav Mečíř, Jr. | 3 | 7 | 6 |
