= 2010 UNICEF Open =

Tennis tournament

- Date: 13–19 June
- Edition: 21st
- Category: 250 Series (men); International (women)
- Surface: Grass / outdoor
- Location: Rosmalen, 's-Hertogenbosch, Netherlands
- Venue: Autotron park

Champions

Men's singles
- (Ukraine) Sergiy Stakhovsky

Women's singles
- (Belgium) Justine Henin

Men's doubles
- (Sweden) Robert Lindstedt / (Romania) Horia Tecău

Women's doubles
- (Russia) Alla Kudryavtseva / (Australia) Anastasia Rodionova
← 2009 ·	UNICEF Open	· 2011 →

The 2010 UNICEF Open was a tennis tournament played on outdoor grass courts. It was the 21st edition of the UNICEF Open, and was part of the 250 Series of the 2010 ATP World Tour, and of the WTA International tournaments of the 2010 WTA Tour. Both the men's and the women's events took place at the Autotron park in Rosmalen, 's-Hertogenbosch, Netherlands, from 13 June through 19 June 2010. Sergiy Stakhovsky and Justine Henin won the singles titles.

== Finals ==
=== Men's singles ===
(Ukraine) Sergiy Stakhovsky defeated (Serbia) Janko Tipsarević 6–3, 6–0

- It was Stakhovsky's first title of the year and 3rd of his career.

=== Women's singles ===
(Belgium) Justine Henin defeated (Germany) Andrea Petkovic, 3–6, 6–3, 6–4

- It was Henin's second title of the year and 43rd in her career.

=== Men's doubles ===
(Sweden) Robert Lindstedt / (Romania) Horia Tecău defeated (Czech Republic) Lukáš Dlouhý / (India) Leander Paes 1–6, 7–5, [10–7]

=== Women's doubles ===
(Russia) Alla Kudryavtseva / (Australia) Anastasia Rodionova defeated (United States) Vania King / (Kazakhstan) Yaroslava Shvedova 3–6, 6–3, [10–6]

== ATP entrants ==
=== Seeds ===
Player	Nationality	Ranking*	Seeding
Ivan Ljubičić	Croatia	15	1
Marcos Baghdatis	Cyprus	26	2
Tommy Robredo	Spain	36	3
Viktor Troicki	Serbia	39	4
Philipp Petzschner	Germany	41	5
Thiemo de Bakker	Netherlands	44	6
Janko Tipsarević	Serbia	50	7
Benjamin Becker	Germany	52	8

- Seedings are based on the rankings of June 7, 2010.

=== Other entrants ===
The following players received wildcards into the main draw:

- (Netherlands) Robin Haase
- (Finland) Henri Kontinen
- (Netherlands) Igor Sijsling

The following players received entry from the qualifying draw:

- (Jamaica) Dustin Brown
- (Australia) Rameez Junaid
- (Germany) Simon Stadler
- (Belgium) Kristof Vliegen

The following player received the lucky loser spot:

- (United States) Rajeev Ram

== WTA entrants ==
=== Seeds ===
Player	Nationality	Ranking*	Seeding
Justine Henin	Belgium	18	1
Dinara Safina	Russia	20	2
Maria Kirilenko	Russia	28	3
Yaroslava Shvedova	Kazakhstan	32	4
Alexandra Dulgheru	Romania	31	5
Sara Errani	Italy	33	6
Andrea Petkovic	Germany	34	7
Anabel Medina Garrigues	Spain	38	8

- Seedings are based on the rankings of June 7, 2010.

=== Other entrants ===
The following players received wildcards into the main draw:

- (Belgium) Justine Henin
- (United Kingdom) Laura Robson
- (Netherlands) Arantxa Rus

The following players received entry from the qualifying draw:

- (France) Julie Coin
- (Spain) Arantxa Parra Santonja
- (Australia) Anastasia Rodionova
- (Czech Republic) Sandra Záhlavová
