= 2011 UNICEF Open – Women's doubles =

Women's doubles
- 2011 UNICEF Open

Final
- Champions: (Czech Republic) Barbora Záhlavová-Strýcová (Czech Republic) Klára Zakopalová
- Runners-up: (Slovakia) Dominika Cibulková (Italy) Flavia Pennetta
- Score: 1–6, 6–4, [10–7]

Details
- Draw: 16
- Seeds: 4

Events
Singles	men	women
Doubles	men	women
← 2010 ·	UNICEF Open	· 2012 →

Alla Kudryavtseva and Anastasia Rodionova were the defending champions, but Rodionova decided not to participate.
Kudryavtseva played alongside Olga Govortsova, but lost in the first round to Raquel Kops-Jones and Abigail Spears.

4th seeds Barbora Záhlavová-Strýcová and Klára Zakopalová won the title beating Dominika Cibulková and Flavia Pennetta 1–6, 6–4, [10–7] in the final.

== Seeds ==
1. (Russia) Maria Kirilenko / (Romania) Monica Niculescu (first round, retired due to Niculescu's left abdominal injury)
2. (Italy) Sara Errani / (Italy) Roberta Vinci (quarterfinals)
3. (Belarus) Olga Govortsova / (Russia) Alla Kudryavtseva (first round)
4. (Czech Republic) Barbora Záhlavová-Strýcová / (Czech Republic) Klára Zakopalová (champions)

== Draw ==
=== Key ===
- Q = Qualifier
- WC = Wild card
- LL = Lucky loser
- Alt = Alternate
- ITF = ITF entry
- PR = Protected ranking
- SR = Special ranking
- SE = Special exempt
- JE = Junior exempt
- JR = Junior Accelerator Programme entrant
- CO = College Accelerator Programme entrant
- NG = Next Gen Accelerator Program entrant
- w/o = Walkover
- r = Retired
- d = Defaulted

=== Draw ===
First round
1	(Russia) M Kirilenko (Romania) M Niculescu	2^{r}
(Germany) K Barrois (Germany) J Wöhr	5
(Italy) A Brianti (Japan) K Date-Krumm	6	6^{6}	[8]
WC	(Belgium) K Flipkens (United States) C Vandeweghe	3	7^{8}	[10]
4	(Czech Republic) B Záhlavová-Strýcová (Czech Republic) K Zakopalová	6	6^{4}	[10]
(Turkey) İ Şenoğlu (Tunisia) S Sfar	3	7^{7}	[4]
(Ukraine) A Bondarenko (Ukraine) K Bondarenko	6	0	[10]
(Spain) L Domínguez Lino (Spain) A Parra Santonja	3	6	[12]
(Russia) M Kondratieva (China) S Sun	6	6
(Uzbekistan) A Amanmuradova (Belarus) T Poutchek	4	3
(United States) R Kops-Jones (United States) A Spears	6	6
3	(Belarus) O Govortsova (Russia) A Kudryavtseva	3	1
(Latvia) L Dekmeijere (Croatia) D Jurak	3	2
(Slovakia) D Cibulková (Italy) F Pennetta	6	6
WC	(Netherlands) D Schuurs (Belgium) A van Uytvanck	3	3
2	(Italy) S Errani (Italy) R Vinci	6	6

Quarterfinals
(Germany) K Barrois (Germany) J Wöhr	5	4
WC	(Belgium) K Flipkens (United States) C Vandeweghe	7	6
4	(Czech Republic) B Záhlavová-Strýcová (Czech Republic) K Zakopalová	6	1	[10]
(Spain) L Domínguez Lino (Spain) A Parra Santonja	4	6	[4]
(Russia) M Kondratieva (China) S Sun	3	6	[10]
(United States) R Kops-Jones (United States) A Spears	6	3	[6]
(Slovakia) D Cibulková (Italy) F Pennetta	3	6	[10]
2	(Italy) S Errani (Italy) R Vinci	6	4	[6]

Semifinals
WC	(Belgium) K Flipkens (United States) C Vandeweghe	4	1
4	(Czech Republic) B Záhlavová-Strýcová (Czech Republic) K Zakopalová	6	6
(Russia) M Kondratieva (China) S Sun	0	2
(Slovakia) D Cibulková (Italy) F Pennetta	6	6

Final
4	(Czech Republic) B Záhlavová-Strýcová (Czech Republic) K Zakopalová	1	6	[10]
(Slovakia) D Cibulková (Italy) F Pennetta	6	4	[7]
