= Carlos Rodríguez (tennis coach) =

Argentinian tennis coach

- Country (sports): Argentina

Coaching career (1994–)
- Dominique Monami (1994–1996); Justine Henin (1995–2008; 2010–2011); Li Na (2012–2014); Daniela Hantuchová (2015-2017); Peng Shuai (2018-2019); Amanda Anisimova (2019-2020)

Coaching achievements
- Coachee singles titles total: 48
- Coachee doubles titles total: 2
- List of notable tournaments (with champion) 2x Australian Open (Henin-Hardenne, Li); 4x French Open (Henin); 2x US Open (Henin); Olympic Gold Medal (Henin-Hardenne); 2x WTA Tour Championships (Henin); 11x WTA Tier I/Premier Mandatory/Premier 5 (Henin, Li); Fed Cup (Henin)
- Last updated on: 22 September 2014.

Carlos Rodríguez is an Argentinian tennis coach. Although he has coached several players both on the ATP and the WTA tour, Rodríguez is most notable for his long-time collaboration with the former World No. 1 and multiple grand slam winner Justine Henin. As of 2011, the pair had been together for 15 years, but a portion of that span includes Henin's brief retirement from the pro circuit. Upon Henin's comeback, she insisted that she could not have any other coach than Rodriguez. Rodriguez obliged. He has since commented that her aspiration to return to the highest echelon of the women's game – and rankings, as she retired while holding the No. 1 ranking – has as much to do with factors off the court, that is, mental preparedness and her private life, as it does with her physical fitness or shot-making abilities.

Before Rodríguez became Henin's coach, he coached Belgian tennis player Dominique Monami from 1994 to 1996. On the men's tour he is notable for coaching Olivier Rochus and Dick Norman.

In July 2012, Rodríguez was hired by former French Open champion Li Na on a trial basis. After becoming Li's full-time coach, he was credited for her late career surge during which she ascended to world No. 2 and won her second Major title at the 2014 Australian Open. In July 2014, Rodríguez and Li parted ways. Rodríguez resided in Beijing and works at a tennis academy there. In December 2014, he started coaching Daniela Hantuchová. In late 2019, Rodriguez and Amanda Animisova joined forces and worked together for a trial until the 2020 Australian open where they parted ways.
