= 2010 UNICEF Open – Men's doubles =

Men's doubles
- 2010 UNICEF Open

Final
- Champions: (Sweden) Robert Lindstedt (Romania) Horia Tecău
- Runners-up: (Czech Republic) Lukáš Dlouhý (India) Leander Paes
- Score: 1–6, 7–5, [10–7]

Events
Singles	men	women
Doubles	men	women
← 2009 ·	UNICEF Open	· 2011 →

Wesley Moodie and Dick Norman were defending champions, but they lost in the semifinals against Robert Lindstedt and Horia Tecău.
Lindstedt and Tecău won the final 1–6, 7–5, [10–7] against Lukáš Dlouhý and Leander Paes.

== Seeds ==
1. (Czech Republic) Lukáš Dlouhý / (India) Leander Paes (final)
2. (South Africa) Wesley Moodie / (Belgium) Dick Norman (semifinals)
3. (Germany) Christopher Kas / (Germany) Michael Kohlmann (first round)
4. (Sweden) Robert Lindstedt / (Romania) Horia Tecău (champions)

== Main draw ==
=== Key ===
- Q = Qualifier
- WC = Wild card
- LL = Lucky loser
- Alt = Alternate
- SE = Special exempt
- PR = Protected ranking
- ITF = ITF entry
- JE = Junior exempt
- w/o = Walkover
- r = Retired
- d = Defaulted
- SR = Special ranking

=== Draw ===
First round
1	(Czech Republic) L Dlouhý (India) L Paes	6	6^{5}	[10]
(France) F Serra (Belgium) K Vliegen	1	7^{7}	[6]
(Colombia) A Falla (Colombia) S Giraldo	4	2
WC	(Netherlands) T de Bakker (Netherlands) R Haase	6	6
3	(Germany) C Kas (Germany) M Kohlmann	6^{3}	6	[7]
(Germany) B Becker (United States) S Lipsky	7^{7}	4	[10]
(Czech Republic) M Damm (Slovakia) F Polášek	6	6
(Switzerland) M Chiudinelli (France) A Clément	4	1
(United States) E Butorac (United States) R Ram	3	4
(India) R Bopanna (Pakistan) A-u-H Qureshi	6	6
(France) J Chardy (Ukraine) S Stakhovsky	2	3
4	(Sweden) R Lindstedt (Romania) H Tecău	6	6
(Germany) P Marx (Slovakia) I Zelenay	4	6	[3]
WC	(Netherlands) I Sijsling (Netherlands) R Wassen	6	3	[10]
(Sweden) J Brunström (Netherlands Antilles) J-J Rojer	4	4
2	(South Africa) W Moodie (Belgium) D Norman	6	6

Quarterfinals
1	(Czech Republic) L Dlouhý (India) L Paes	7	6
WC	(Netherlands) T de Bakker (Netherlands) R Haase	5	3
(Germany) B Becker (United States) S Lipsky	6	4	[10]
(Czech Republic) M Damm (Slovakia) F Polášek	4	6	[7]
(India) R Bopanna (Pakistan) A-u-H Qureshi	2	3
4	(Sweden) R Lindstedt (Romania) H Tecău	6	6
WC	(Netherlands) I Sijsling (Netherlands) R Wassen	1	6	[7]
2	(South Africa) W Moodie (Belgium) D Norman	6	3	[10]

Semifinals
1	(Czech Republic) L Dlouhý (India) L Paes	7^{7}	6
(Germany) B Becker (United States) S Lipsky	6^{3}	1
4	(Sweden) R Lindstedt (Romania) H Tecău	7^{7}	7^{7}
2	(South Africa) W Moodie (Belgium) D Norman	6^{5}	6^{4}

Finals
1	(Czech Republic) L Dlouhý (India) L Paes	6	5	[7]
4	(Sweden) R Lindstedt (Romania) H Tecău	1	7	[10]
