= 2010 UNICEF Open – Men's singles =

Men's singles
- 2010 UNICEF Open

Final
- Champion: (Ukraine) Sergiy Stakhovsky
- Runner-up: (Serbia) Janko Tipsarević
- Score: 6–3, 6–0

Details
- Draw: 28 (4 Q / 3 WC )
- Seeds: 8

Events
Singles	men	women
Doubles	men	women
← 2009 ·	UNICEF Open	· 2011 →

Benjamin Becker was the defending champion, but he was defeated in the semifinals against Janko Tipsarević.
Sergiy Stakhovsky won in the final 6–3, 6–0 against Tipsarević.

== Seeds ==
1. (Croatia) Ivan Ljubičić (second round)
2. (Cyprus) Marcos Baghdatis (second round)
3. (Spain) Tommy Robredo (second round)
4. (Serbia) Viktor Troicki (second round)
5. (Germany) Philipp Petzschner (withdrew due a hip injury)
6. (Netherlands) Thiemo de Bakker (first round)
7. (Serbia) Janko Tipsarević (final)
8. (Germany) Benjamin Becker (semifinals)

== Draw ==
=== Key ===
- Q = Qualifier
- WC = Wild card
- LL = Lucky loser
- Alt = Alternate
- SE = Special exempt
- PR = Protected ranking
- ITF = ITF entry
- JE = Junior exempt
- w/o = Walkover
- r = Retired
- d = Defaulted
- SR = Special ranking

=== Finals ===
Semifinals
(Belgium) Xavier Malisse	3	4
(Ukraine) Sergiy Stakhovsky	6	6
8	(Germany) Benjamin Becker	7^{7}	3	4
7	(Serbia) Janko Tipsarević	6^{5}	6	6

Final
(Ukraine) Sergiy Stakhovsky	6	6
7	(Serbia) Janko Tipsarević	3	0

=== Top half ===
First round
(Colombia) A Falla	6	6
(France) F Serra	4	4
Q	(Australia) R Junaid	1	3
(Germany) D Brands	6	6
(Belgium) X Malisse	6	6
LL	(United States) R Ram	3	2
(Colombia) S Giraldo	6	7
(Switzerland) M Chiudinelli	2	5
Q	(Belgium) K Vliegen	2	1
(Ukraine) S Stakhovsky	6	6
WC	(Netherlands) I Sijsling	4	6	7^{7}
6	(Netherlands) T de Bakker	6	2	6^{4}

Second round
1	(Croatia) I Ljubičić	2	6^{6}
(Colombia) A Falla	6	7^{8}
(Germany) D Brands	6	1	5
(Belgium) X Malisse	4	6	7
4	(Serbia) V Troicki	4	4
(Colombia) S Giraldo	6	6
(Ukraine) S Stakhovsky	6	7^{7}
WC	(Netherlands) I Sijsling	2	6^{4}

Quarterfinals
(Colombia) A Falla	3	6	3
(Belgium) X Malisse	6	3	6
(Colombia) S Giraldo	3	4
(Ukraine) S Stakhovsky	6	6

Semifinals
(Belgium) X Malisse	3	4
(Ukraine) S Stakhovsky	6	6

=== Bottom half ===
First round
8	(Germany) B Becker	6	3	6
(Finland) J Nieminen	4	6	4
Q	(Jamaica) D Brown	5	6	6^{5}
WC	(Finland) H Kontinen	7	2	7^{7}
(Germany) S Greul	7	7^{7}
WC	(Netherlands) R Haase	5	6^{5}
7	(Serbia) J Tipsarević	6	6
(France) J Chardy	3	4
(France) A Clément	6	3	6
Q	(Germany) S Stadler	1	6	1
(United States) M Russell	6^{6}	6^{3}
(Australia) P Luczak	7^{8}	7^{7}

Second round
8	(Germany) B Becker	6	6
WC	(Finland) H Kontinen	2	1
(Germany) S Greul	6	6
3	(Spain) T Robredo	1	4
7	(Serbia) J Tipsarević	3	6	6
(France) A Clément	6	1	3
(Australia) P Luczak	7	6
2	(Cyprus) M Baghdatis	5	1

Quarterfinals
8	(Germany) B Becker	6	6
(Germany) S Greul	3	1
7	(Serbia) J Tipsarević	6	6
(Australia) P Luczak	3	3

Semifinals
8	(Germany) B Becker	7^{7}	3	4
7	(Serbia) J Tipsarević	6^{5}	6	6
