= 2011 UNICEF Open – Women's singles =

Women's singles
- 2011 UNICEF Open

Final
- Champion: (Italy) Roberta Vinci
- Runner-up: (Australia) Jelena Dokić
- Score: 6–7^{(7–9)}, 6–3, 7–5

Details
- Draw: 32 (4 Q / 3 WC )
- Seeds: 8

Events
Singles	men	women
Doubles	men	women
- UNICEF Open

Justine Henin was the defending champion, but retired earlier in the year.

Seventh-seeded Italian Roberta Vinci won the tournament beating unseeded Australian Jelena Dokić 6–7^{(7–9)}, 6–3, 7–5 in the final.

== Seeds ==
1. (Belgium) Kim Clijsters (second round)
2. (Russia) Svetlana Kuznetsova (quarterfinals)
3. (Belgium) Yanina Wickmayer (quarterfinals)
4. (Italy) Flavia Pennetta (second round)
5. (Slovakia) Dominika Cibulková (semifinals)
6. (Russia) Maria Kirilenko (first round)
7. (Italy) Roberta Vinci (champion)
8. (Czech Republic) Klára Zakopalová (first round)

== Draw ==
Key

- Q = Qualifier
- WC = Wild card
- LL = Lucky loser
- Alt = Alternate
- ITF = ITF entry
- PR = Protected ranking
- SR = Special ranking
- SE = Special exempt
- JE = Junior exempt
- JR = Junior Accelerator Programme entrant
- CO = College Accelerator Programme entrant
- NG = Next Gen Accelerator Program entrant
- w/o = Walkover
- r = Retired
- d = Defaulted

=== Finals ===
Semifinals
Q	(Italy) Romina Oprandi	4	0^{r}
(Australia) Jelena Dokić	6	2
7	(Italy) Roberta Vinci	7	6
5	(Slovakia) Dominika Cibulková	5	1

Final
(Australia) Jelena Dokić	7^{9}	3	5
7	(Italy) Roberta Vinci	6^{7}	6	7

=== Top half ===
First round
1	(Belgium) K Clijsters	7	7
(Romania) M Niculescu	5	5
Q	(Uzbekistan) A Amanmuradova	4	3
Q	(Italy) R Oprandi	6	6
(Spain) L Domínguez Lino	6	6
(Russia) A Chakvetadze	4	1
(Japan) K Date-Krumm	7^{7}	6
6	(Russia) M Kirilenko	6^{5}	2
4	(Italy) F Pennetta	6	6
(Ukraine) A Bondarenko	4	4
(Australia) J Dokić	6	6
(Russia) A Kudryavtseva	0	4
(Canada) R Marino	5	5
(Sweden) J Larsson	7	7
WC	(Belgium) K Flipkens	6	6
8	(Czech Republic) K Zakopalová	3	2

Second round
1	(Belgium) K Clijsters	6^{5}	3
Q	(Italy) R Oprandi	7^{7}	6
(Spain) L Domínguez Lino	6^{3}	0
(Japan) K Date-Krumm	7^{7}	6
4	(Italy) F Pennetta	3	4
(Australia) J Dokić	6	6
(Sweden) J Larsson	6	5	6
WC	(Belgium) K Flipkens	2	7	4

Quarterfinals
Q	(Italy) R Oprandi	7^{7}	6
(Japan) K Date-Krumm	6^{3}	4
(Australia) J Dokić	7^{7}	6
(Sweden) J Larsson	6^{2}	4

Semifinals
Q	(Italy) R Oprandi	4	0^{r}
(Australia) J Dokić	6	2

=== Bottom half ===
First round
7	(Italy) R Vinci	6	6
(Slovenia) P Hercog	4	2
(Romania) A Dulgheru	7	7^{9}
Q	(Belgium) A van Uytvanck	5	6^{7}
WC	(United Kingdom) L Robson	5	3
(Spain) A Parra Santonja	7	6
(Italy) A Brianti	4	0
3	(Belgium) Y Wickmayer	6	6
5	(Slovakia) D Cibulková	6	6
(Romania) S Halep	3	0
(Czech Republic) B Záhlavová-Strýcová	3	2
(Germany) K Barrois	6	6
WC	(Netherlands) K Bertens	6^{8}	1
(Italy) S Errani	7^{10}	6
Q	(Netherlands) A Rus	2	4
2	(Russia) S Kuznetsova	6	6

Second round
7	(Italy) R Vinci	6	6
(Romania) A Dulgheru	2	1
(Spain) A Parra Santonja	6^{4}	7^{7}	5
3	(Belgium) Y Wickmayer	7^{7}	6^{4}	7
5	(Slovakia) D Cibulková	6	6
(Germany) K Barrois	0	1
(Italy) S Errani	6	6^{3}	1
2	(Russia) S Kuznetsova	3	7^{7}	6

Quarterfinals
7	(Italy) R Vinci	6	6
3	(Belgium) Y Wickmayer	4	4
5	(Slovakia) D Cibulková	7	4	6
2	(Russia) S Kuznetsova	5	6	2

Semifinals
7	(Italy) R Vinci	7	6
5	(Slovakia) D Cibulková	5	1
