= 2011 UNICEF Open – Men's doubles =

Men's doubles
- 2011 UNICEF Open

Final
- Champions: (Italy) Daniele Bracciali (Czech Republic) František Čermák
- Runners-up: (Sweden) Robert Lindstedt (Romania) Horia Tecău
- Score: 6–3, 2–6, [10–8]

Events
Singles	men	women
Doubles	men	women
← 2010 ·	UNICEF Open	· 2012 →

Robert Lindstedt and Horia Tecău were the defending champions, but Daniele Bracciali and František Čermák defeated them 6–3, 2–6, [10–8] in the final.

== Seeds ==
1. (India) Mahesh Bhupathi / (India) Leander Paes (withdrew)
2. (Sweden) Robert Lindstedt / (Romania) Horia Tecău (final)
3. (United States) Eric Butorac / (Curaçao) Jean-Julien Rojer (quarterfinals)
4. (South Africa) Wesley Moodie / (Belgium) Dick Norman (first round)

== Draw ==
=== Key ===
- Q = Qualifier
- WC = Wild card
- LL = Lucky loser
- Alt = Alternate
- SE = Special exempt
- PR = Protected ranking
- ITF = ITF entry
- JE = Junior exempt
- w/o = Walkover
- r = Retired
- d = Defaulted
- SR = Special ranking

=== Draw ===
First round
Alt	(United States) A Bogomolov Jr. (Austria) A Haider-Maurer	5	4
(Slovakia) F Polášek (Slovakia) I Zelenay	7	6
(Spain) D Gimeno-Traver (Colombia) S Giraldo	6	6
(Colombia) A Falla (Russia) D Tursunov	2	4
3	(United States) E Butorac (Curaçao) J-J Rojer	6	6
WC	(Argentina) M González (United States) M Russell	3	2
(Italy) D Bracciali (Czech Republic) F Čermák	6	3	[11]
(Netherlands) R Haase (United Kingdom) K Skupski	4	6	[9]
(United States) J Cerretani (Germany) P Marx	5	6	[11]
(Croatia) I Dodig (Croatia) L Zovko	7	4	[9]
WC	(Netherlands) J Huta Galung (Netherlands) R Wassen	4	6	[11]
4	(South Africa) W Moodie (Belgium) D Norman	6	3	[9]
(Czech Republic) L Dlouhý (Germany) M Kohlmann	6	3	[10]
(Sweden) J Brunström (Canada) A Shamasdin	4	6	[6]
(Germany) C Kas (Austria) A Peya	6^{13}	6	[7]
2	(Sweden) R Lindstedt (Romania) H Tecău	7^{15}	2	[10]

Quarterfinals
(Slovakia) F Polášek (Slovakia) I Zelenay	6	7^{7}
(Spain) D Gimeno-Traver (Colombia) S Giraldo	0	6^{3}
3	(United States) E Butorac (Curaçao) J-J Rojer	6^{4}	6^{5}
(Italy) D Bracciali (Czech Republic) F Čermák	7^{7}	7^{7}
(United States) J Cerretani (Germany) P Marx	5	6	[9]
WC	(Netherlands) J Huta Galung (Netherlands) R Wassen	7	4	[11]
(Czech Republic) L Dlouhý (Germany) M Kohlmann	6^{6}	2
2	(Sweden) R Lindstedt (Romania) H Tecău	7^{8}	6

Semifinals
(Slovakia) F Polášek (Slovakia) I Zelenay	6^{5}	6^{4}
(Italy) D Bracciali (Czech Republic) F Čermák	7^{7}	7^{7}
WC	(Netherlands) J Huta Galung (Netherlands) R Wassen	2	7^{7}	[7]
2	(Sweden) R Lindstedt (Romania) H Tecău	6	6^{2}	[10]

Final
(Italy) D Bracciali (Czech Republic) F Čermák	6	2	[10]
2	(Sweden) R Lindstedt (Romania) H Tecău	3	6	[8]
