= 2011 UNICEF Open – Men's singles =

Men's singles
- 2011 UNICEF Open

Final
- Champion: (Russia) Dmitry Tursunov
- Runner-up: (Croatia) Ivan Dodig
- Score: 6–3, 6–2

Details
- Draw: 28 (4 Q / 3 WC )
- Seeds: 8

Events
Singles	men	women
Doubles	men	women
← 2010 ·	UNICEF Open	· 2012 →

Sergiy Stakhovsky was the defending champion but chose to compete in the 2011 Aegon International.

Unseeded Dmitry Tursunov won the tournament beating Ivan Dodig 6–3, 6–2 in the final.

== Seeds ==
1. (Spain) Nicolás Almagro (first round)
2. (Cyprus) Marcos Baghdatis (semifinals)
3. (Belgium) Xavier Malisse (semifinals)
4. (Croatia) Ivan Dodig (final)
5. (Finland) Jarkko Nieminen (second round)
6. (France) Adrian Mannarino (first round)
7. (France) Jérémy Chardy (first round)
8. (Spain) Daniel Gimeno-Traver (first round)

== Draw ==
=== Key ===
- Q = Qualifier
- WC = Wild card
- LL = Lucky loser
- Alt = Alternate
- SE = Special exempt
- PR = Protected ranking
- ITF = ITF entry
- JE = Junior exempt
- w/o = Walkover
- r = Retired
- d = Defaulted
- SR = Special ranking

=== Finals ===
Semifinals
(Russia) Dmitry Tursunov	6	7^{7}
3	(Belgium) Xavier Malisse	3	6^{1}
4	(Croatia) Ivan Dodig	7^{7}	6
2/WC	(Cyprus) Marcos Baghdatis	6^{4}	1

Final
(Russia) Dmitry Tursunov	6	6
4	(Croatia) Ivan Dodig	3	2

=== Top half ===
First round
1	(Spain) N Almagro	6	6^{5}	4
(Germany) M Berrer	3	7^{7}	6
(United States) M Russell	6^{4}	3
(Colombia) S Giraldo	7^{7}	6
(Russia) D Tursunov	6	7^{7}
(United States) R Kendrick	2	6^{3}
(France) N Mahut	7^{7}	6
6	(France) A Mannarino	6^{2}	3
3	(Belgium) X Malisse	6	6
Q	(Colombia) A Falla	3	1
WC	(Netherlands) J Huta Galung	6	3	7
(Germany) J Reister	2	6	5
(Brazil) R Mello	4	6^{5}
(Italy) F Volandri	6	7^{7}
(United States) A Bogomolov Jr.	3	6	7^{9}
8	(France) J Chardy	6	4	6^{7}

Second round
(Germany) M Berrer	6^{6}	3
(Colombia) S Giraldo	7^{8}	6
(Russia) D Tursunov	7^{7}	3	6
(France) N Mahut	6^{2}	6	3
3	(Belgium) X Malisse	7^{7}	6
WC	(Netherlands) J Huta Galung	6^{2}	4
(Italy) F Volandri	6^{2}	2
(United States) A Bogomolov Jr.	7^{7}	6

Quarterfinals
(Colombia) S Giraldo	3	6	4
(Russia) D Tursunov	6	4	6
3	(Belgium) X Malisse	6	6
(United States) A Bogomolov Jr.	2	4

Semifinals
(Russia) D Tursunov	6	7^{7}
3	(Belgium) X Malisse	3	6^{1}

=== Bottom half ===
First round
8	(Spain) D Gimeno-Traver	3	6^{4}
WC	(Spain) J Martí	6	7^{7}
(Russia) T Gabashvili	6	1	6
Q	(Russia) K Kravchuk	4	6	4
(Austria) A Haider-Maurer	6	6^{3}	6
(Slovenia) B Kavčič	4	7^{7}	4
(Romania) V Hănescu	4	5
4	(Croatia) I Dodig	6	7
5	(Finland) J Nieminen	7	6
(Argentina) M González	5	1
(Germany) D Gremelmayr	6	7^{7}
Q	(France) L Walter	3	6^{5}
(Netherlands) R Haase	6	6
(Germany) M Zverev	3	4
Q	(France) A Clément	6^{4}	3
2/WC	(Cyprus) M Baghdatis	7^{7}	6

Second round
WC	(Spain) J Martí	6^{6}	3
(Russia) T Gabashvili	7^{8}	6
(Austria) A Haider-Maurer	4	3
4	(Croatia) I Dodig	6	6
5	(Finland) J Nieminen	6^{3}	6	6^{5}
(Germany) D Gremelmayr	7^{7}	2	7^{7}
(Netherlands) R Haase	5	4
2/WC	(Cyprus) M Baghdatis	7	6

Quarterfinals
(Russia) T Gabashvili	6	1	2
4	(Croatia) I Dodig	2	6	6
(Germany) D Gremelmayr	1	0
2/WC	(Cyprus) M Baghdatis	6	6

Semifinals
4	(Croatia) I Dodig	7^{7}	6
2/WC	(Cyprus) M Baghdatis	6^{4}	1
