= 2010 UNICEF Open – Women's doubles =

Women's doubles
- 2010 UNICEF Open

Final
- Champions: (Russia) Alla Kudryavtseva (Australia) Anastasia Rodionova
- Runners-up: (United States) Vania King (Kazakhstan) Yaroslava Shvedova
- Score: 3–6, 6–3, [10–6]

Events
Singles	men	women
Doubles	men	women
- UNICEF Open

Sara Errani and Flavia Pennetta were the defending champions, but Pennetta decided not to participate.
Errani partnered up with Roberta Vinci, but they lost in the semifinals against Vania King and Yaroslava Shvedova.
Alla Kudryavtseva and Anastasia Rodionova won in the final 3–6, 6–3, [10–6] against King and Shvedova .

== Seeds ==
1. (Chinese Taipei) Hsieh Su-wei / (Spain) Anabel Medina Garrigues (semifinals)
2. (Russia) Maria Kirilenko / (Russia) Elena Vesnina (quarterfinals, retired)
3. (Russia) Alla Kudryavtseva / (Australia) Anastasia Rodionova (champions)
4. (United States) Vania King / (Kazakhstan) Yaroslava Shvedova (finals)

== Draw ==
Key

- Q = Qualifier
- WC = Wild card
- LL = Lucky loser
- Alt = Alternate
- ITF = ITF entry
- PR = Protected ranking
- SR = Special ranking
- SE = Special exempt
- JE = Junior exempt
- JR = Junior Accelerator Programme entrant
- CO = College Accelerator Programme entrant
- NG = Next Gen Accelerator Program entrant
- w/o = Walkover
- r = Retired
- d = Defaulted

First round
1	(Chinese Taipei) S-w Hsieh (Spain) A Medina Garrigues	6	6
(Germany) K Barrois (Czech Republic) B Záhlavová-Strýcová	4	4
(Australia) S Peers (United Kingdom) L Robson	5	6	[6]
(Poland) K Jans (Romania) IR Olaru	7	1	[10]
3	(Russia) A Kudryavtseva (Australia) A Rodionova	3	6	[11]
(United Kingdom) S Borwell (United States) R Kops-Jones	6	4	[9]
(Belarus) T Poutchek (Turkey) İ Şenoğlu	7	6^{1}	[10]
(Russia) M Kondratieva (Czech Republic) V Uhlířová	5	7	[7]
(France) S Lefèvre (Canada) M-È Pelletier	2	3
(Hungary) M Czink (Spain) A Parra Santonja	6	6
(Latvia) L Dekmeijere (United States) R Zalameda	0	3
4	(United States) V King (Kazakhstan) Y Shvedova	6	6
(Germany) T Malek (Germany) A Petkovic	4	2
(Italy) S Errani (Italy) R Vinci	6	6
WC	(Sweden) S Arvidsson (Netherlands) A Rus	1	2
2	(Russia) M Kirilenko (Russia) E Vesnina	6	6

Quarterfinals
1	(Chinese Taipei) S-w Hsieh (Spain) A Medina Garrigues	6	7
(Poland) K Jans (Romania) IR Olaru	2	6^{3}
3	(Russia) A Kudryavtseva (Australia) A Rodionova	2	6	[10]
(Belarus) T Poutchek (Turkey) İ Şenoğlu	6	4	[8]
(Hungary) M Czink (Spain) A Parra Santonja	4	6	[4]
4	(United States) V King (Kazakhstan) Y Shvedova	6	3	[10]
(Italy) S Errani (Italy) R Vinci	3
2	(Russia) M Kirilenko (Russia) E Vesnina	0	r

Semifinals
1	(Chinese Taipei) S-w Hsieh (Spain) A Medina Garrigues	6^{5}	7	[8]
3	(Russia) A Kudryavtseva (Australia) A Rodionova	7	6^{3}	[10]
4	(United States) V King (Kazakhstan) Y Shvedova	6	6
(Italy) S Errani (Italy) R Vinci	3	3

Finals
3	(Russia) A Kudryavtseva (Australia) A Rodionova	3	6	[10]
4	(United States) V King (Kazakhstan) Y Shvedova	6	3	[6]
