= Justine Henin =

Belgian tennis player (born 1982)

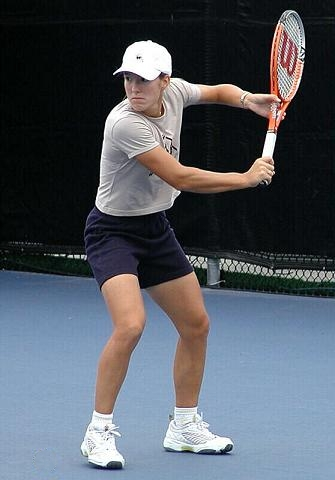
- Country (sports): Belgium
- Residence: Brussels, Belgium
- Born: 1 June 1982 (age 44) Liège, Belgium
- Height: 1.67 m (5 ft 5 1/2 in)
- Turned pro: 1 January 1999
- Retired: 26 January 2011
- Plays: Right-handed (one-handed backhand)
- Coach: Carlos Rodríguez (1995–2008; 2010–2011)
- Prize money: US$ 20,863,335: 27th in all-time rankings
- Int. Tennis HoF: 2016 (member page)

Singles
- Career record: 525–115 (82.03%)
- Career titles: 43
- Highest ranking: No. 1 (20 October 2003)

Grand Slam singles results
- Australian Open: W (2004)
- French Open: W (2003, 2005, 2006, 2007)
- Wimbledon: F (2001, 2006)
- US Open: W (2003, 2007)

Other tournaments
- Tour Finals: W (2006, 2007)
- Olympic Games: W (2004)

Doubles
- Career record: 47–35 (57.3%)
- Career titles: 2
- Highest ranking: No. 23 (14 January 2002)

Grand Slam doubles results
- Australian Open: 3R (2003)
- French Open: SF (2001)
- Wimbledon: 3R (2001)
- US Open: 2R (2001, 2002)

Team competitions
- Fed Cup: W (2001)
- Hopman Cup: F (2011)
Medal record
Women's tennis
Representing Belgium
Olympic Games
Gold medal – first place	2004 Athens	Women's singles

Justine Henin CMW (French pronunciation: [ʒystin ɛnɛ̃]; born 1 June 1982) is a Belgian former professional tennis player. She was ranked as the world No. 1 in women's singles by the Women's Tennis Association (WTA) for 117 weeks, including as the year-end No. 1 in 2003, 2006 and 2007. Henin won 43 WTA Tour-level singles titles, including seven majors (four at the French Open, two at the US Open and one at the Australian Open), as well as an Olympic gold medal at the 2004 Athens Games and two Tour Finals titles. Coming from a country with little success in the sport, Henin (alongside Kim Clijsters) helped establish Belgium as a leading force in women's tennis, leading the country to its first Fed Cup crown in 2001. As of 2026, she is still the most recent female player to have reached the finals of all four grand slam tournaments within the same calendar year.

Henin was known for her all-court style of play and for being one of the few female players to use a single-handed backhand. Tennis experts cite her mental toughness, the completeness and variety of her game, her footspeed and footwork, and her one-handed backhand (which all-time great John McEnroe described as "the best single-handed backhand in both the women's or men's game") as the principal reasons for her success. She retired from professional tennis on 26 January 2011, due to a chronic elbow injury.

In June 2011, she was named one of the "30 Legends of Women's Tennis: Past, Present and Future" by Time. In 2016, she became the first Belgian tennis player inducted into the International Tennis Hall of Fame and in 2023, the International Tennis Federation awarded Henin its highest honor, the Philippe Chatrier Award.

== Early life ==
Justine Henin, occasionally spelled Hénin, was born in Liège to José Henin and Françoise Rosière. Rosière, a French and history teacher, died when Justine was 12 years old. She has two brothers and a sister. When she was two years old, Justine's family moved to a house in Rochefort, situated next to the local tennis club, where she played tennis for the first time.

Henin's mother routinely took the young Henin across the border to France to watch the French Open. In 1995, shortly after her mother's death, Henin met her coach Carlos Rodríguez who guided her career both before her retirement in 2008 and during her 2010 comeback.

== Tennis career ==
=== Early career ===
Henin, known as "Juju" to many of her fans, was coached by Carlos Rodríguez of Argentina. In 1997, she won the junior girls' singles title at the French Open. Early in her junior career, she regularly reached the late rounds of international competitions and won five International Tennis Federation (ITF) tournaments by the end of 1998.

Junior Slam results:

- Australian Open: –
- French Open: W (1997)
- Wimbledon: QF (1997)
- US Open: QF (1997)

She began her professional career on the Women's Tennis Association tour in May 1999 as a wild card entry in the Belgian Open clay tournament at Antwerp and became only the fifth player to win her debut WTA Tour event. She also won her hometown event, the Liège Challenger, in July 2000.

Henin established herself as a major competitor in 2001, consequently reaching the women's singles semifinals of the French Open and then upset the reigning Australian Open and French Open champion Jennifer Capriati in the semifinals of Wimbledon, losing to defending champion Venus Williams in three sets in the final. By the end of the year, Henin was ranked 7th in singles, with three titles to her name. Also that year, she reached the French Open women's doubles semifinals with Elena Tatarkova and helped Belgium to win the 2001 Fed Cup. Moreover, Henin played for the German tennis club Weiß-Blau Schweinfurt in 2001.

In 2002, she reached four WTA finals, winning two of them, and finished the year ranked world No. 5. Her German Open victory, her first win at a Tier I tournament, was noteworthy as she beat Jennifer Capriati in a semifinal and Serena Williams in the final, the then No. 2 and No. 5 ranked players, respectively. At Wimbledon 2002, Henin beat former world No. 1, Monica Seles, in two tough sets.

=== 2003: Ascent to No. 1 ===
Henin started the year as the 5th-ranked player in the world but lost to Kim Clijsters in the semifinals of the Medibank International in Sydney. In the fourth round of the Australian Open in Melbourne, she defeated Lindsay Davenport 7–5, 5–7, 9–7. In a match lasting more than three hours, Henin overcame a 4–1 final set deficit, high temperatures, and muscle cramps to defeat Davenport for the first time in her career. She then lost to Venus Williams in the semifinals in straight sets.

Henin also lost to Clijsters in the semifinals of the Proximus Diamond Games in Antwerp. At the Dubai Tennis Championships one week later, she defeated Monica Seles in the final 4–6, 7–6, 7–5 after Seles had a match point at 5–4 in the second set.

Henin's next tournament was the Tier I Miami Masters. She lost in the quarterfinals to world No. 10, Chanda Rubin, 6–3, 6–2.

At the clay court Family Circle Cup in Charleston, South Carolina, Henin defeated world No. 1 Serena Williams in the final. This was Williams' first loss of the year after 21 wins.

The following week, Henin reached the semifinals of the Bausch & Lomb Championships in Amelia Island, Florida, losing to eventual winner Elena Dementieva 3–6, 6–4, 7–5. Henin then helped Belgium defeat Austria 5–0 in a first round tie of the Fed Cup.

In May, Henin successfully defended her title at the German Open in Berlin. In the final, she saved three match points in the third set before defeating Clijsters.

Henin's seven major titles
- GS Singles Trophies
- 1 at the 2003 Roland Garros (as Henin-Hardenne)
- 2 at the 2003 US Open (as Henin-Hardenne)
- 3 at the 2004 Australian Open (as Henin-Hardenne)
- 4 at the 2005 Roland Garros (as Henin-Hardenne)
- 5 at the 2006 Roland Garros (as Henin-Hardenne)
- 6 at the 2007 Roland Garros (as Henin)
- 7 at the 2007 US Open (as Henin)

At the French Open, she was the fourth seeded player and defeated the defending champion, Serena Williams, in a controversial semifinal 6–2, 4–6, 7–5 which saw Henin asked to acknowledge her raised hand during a Williams service motion. In the final, Henin defeated Clijsters in straight sets. This was her first Grand Slam title, and she was the first Belgian ever to win a Grand Slam singles title.

Henin then began her preparations for Wimbledon. At the grass court Ordina Open in Rosmalen, she lost in the final to Clijsters; she was forced to retire from the match after injuring her finger. At Wimbledon, Henin was the third seeded player. She defeated Mary Pierce in the fourth round and Svetlana Kuznetsova in the quarterfinals before losing to Serena Williams in straight sets.

Henin's first competition after Wimbledon was the Fed Cup tie against Slovakia. She won both her singles matches to help Belgium win the tie 5–0 and begin her 22-match winning streak. She then played two tournaments during the North American summer hard court season before the US Open. At the Tier I Acura Classic in San Diego, the third-seeded Henin defeated the top-seeded Clijsters in the final. Henin was accused of poor sportsmanship by Kim Clijsters. Two weeks later at the Tier I Rogers Cup in Toronto, she defeated Russia's Lina Krasnoroutskaya in the final.

Henin was the second-seeded player at the US Open. She won her first four matches against unseeded players before defeating seventh-seeded Anastasia Myskina in the quarterfinals and then defeated sixth-seeded Jennifer Capriati in the semifinals 4–6, 7–5, 7–6^{(4)} in a match that lasted more than three hours and stretched to midnight. Henin recovered from a 3–5 deficit in the second set and a 2–5 deficit in the final set and was just two points from defeat eleven times. She was treated for muscle cramps and dehydration overnight but returned to play in the final the next day. In the final, Henin defeated Clijsters in straight sets. The win raised Henin's ranking to world No. 2, just behind Clijsters.

At her next event, the indoor Sparkassen Cup in Leipzig, she lost to Myskina in the final. This ended Henin's 22-match winning streak. Two weeks later at the indoor Porsche Tennis Grand Prix in Filderstadt, Henin lost in the final to Clijsters. Had she won this match, she would have immediately replaced Clijsters as the world No. 1.

At the Tier I Zurich Open the following week, Henin reached her sixth consecutive final where she defeated Serbia's Jelena Dokić. This win catapulted her to become the 13th world No. 1 on the WTA computer rankings on 20 October 2003. Henin temporarily lost her number 1 ranking after a week as she declined to defend her title at the Generali Ladies Linz tournament.

At the season-ending WTA Tour Championships in Los Angeles, Henin defeated Myskina and Capriati and lost to Japan's Ai Sugiyama in her round robin matches, which was sufficient to advance and return to the top spot on the WTA ranking. In the semifinals, she lost to Amélie Mauresmo 6–7^{(2)}, 6–3, 3–6, but managed to close a season ranked world No. 1 for the first time.

Henin was named the ITF's women's singles World Champion for 2003.

=== 2004: Australian Open and Olympic gold ===
Henin started 2004 by winning a warm-up tournament in Sydney and then the Australian Open in Melbourne, defeating Clijsters in three sets in the final. By the end of 2004's spring hard court season, Henin had built a 25-match Tier I win streak and 22–1 win–loss record, winning her first 16 matches.

At the start of the spring clay court season, Henin's health was adversely affected by infection with a strain of cytomegalovirus and an immune system problem. She often slept up to 18 hours a day but barely had the strength to brush her teeth, let alone play competitive tennis.

Although Henin decided to defend her French Open title and was seeded first in the tournament, she lost her second round match to a much lower-ranked player, Tathiana Garbin of Italy. At the time, the loss marked only the second time in 15 Grand Slam events that she had lost before the fourth round.

After months of layoff because of a virus, Henin returned to competition in August and won the women's singles gold medal at the Summer Olympics in Athens, defeating Amélie Mauresmo in the final 6–3, 6–3. Henin reached the gold medal match by defeating reigning French Open champion Anastasia Myskina in a semifinal 7–5, 5–7, 8–6 after having trailed 1–5 in the final set. Her medal ceremony was attended by fellow countryman and IOC president Jacques Rogge.

In September, she was unsuccessful in her defence of her US Open title, losing to Nadia Petrova in the fourth round. This defeat caused her to lose the world No. 1 ranking, which she had held for 45 non-consecutive weeks. She then withdrew from the ten remaining tournaments of the year in an effort to recover her health and improve her fitness.

=== 2005: Second French Open and injuries ===
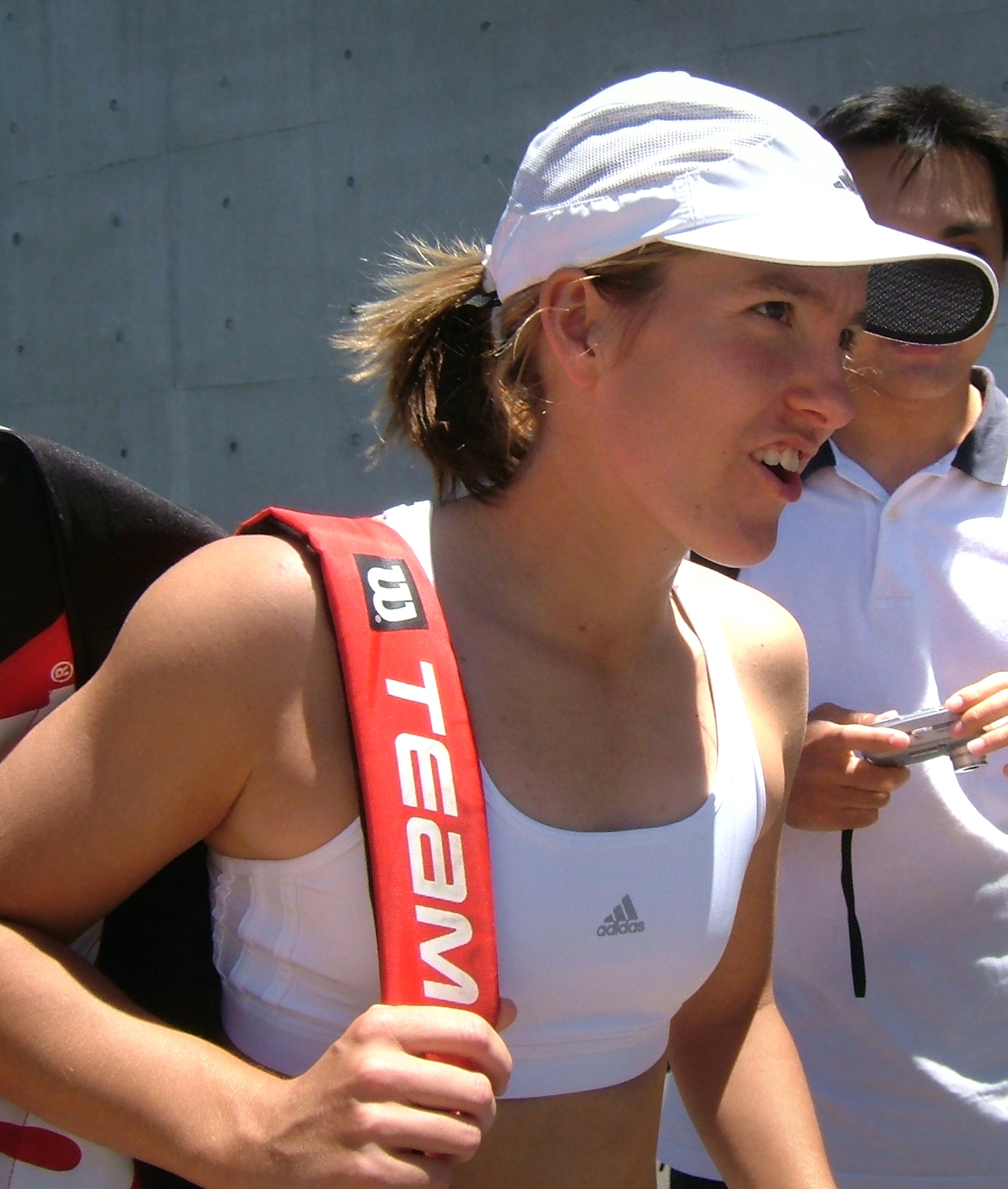
Justine Henin in 2005

Her plan to rejoin the tour at the beginning of 2005 was delayed when she fractured her kneecap in a December 2004 training session.

On 25 March, after more than six months away from competition, Henin returned to the WTA tour at the Miami Masters. She lost to second ranked Maria Sharapova in a quarterfinal. She rebounded at her next tournament, winning the clay court Family Circle Cup in Charleston. She won two more clay court titles before the start of the French Open. Her victories over top-ranked Lindsay Davenport, Sharapova, Elena Dementieva, Svetlana Kuznetsova, and Petrova made her a top contender for the title there.

Henin was seeded tenth at the French Open and defeated the French player Mary Pierce in the final in straight sets to take her second title at Roland Garros. The win marked Henin's 24th consecutive clay court win and her tenth consecutive final win, a streak dating back to Zurich in October 2003. In capturing the title, she defeated Kuznetsova in the fourth round, Sharapova in a quarterfinal, and Petrova in a semifinal. Henin saved two match points to defeat Kuznetsova in the fourth round 7–6^{(6)}, 4–6, 7–5 and thus became only the second woman to win the French Open after saving a match point.

With her French Open victory, Henin moved from world No. 12 to No. 7 in the women's singles rankings. She was a perfect 24–0 on clay this year and joined Monica Seles as the only two currently active (in 2005) players on the WTA Tour to have won the French Open at least twice.

At Wimbledon, her win streak of 24 matches was snapped in the first round by Greek Eleni Daniilidou 7–6, 2–6, 7–5. It was the first time that a reigning French Open champion failed to win a match at Wimbledon. A hamstring injury sustained earlier in the year eventually limited her to playing only 11 more matches for 2005.

Henin next played the Rogers Cup in Toronto, where she reached the final after beating Mauresmo in a semifinal before losing to Clijsters in straight sets. She lost in the fourth round of the US Open to eventual finalist Mary Pierce 3–6, 4–6. Following this, she played in Filderstadt, but after losing her first round match to Flavia Pennetta, she decided not to play for the rest of 2005.

TENNIS Magazine placed her in 31st place on its list of that year of the 40 Greatest Players for the period 1965 through 2005.

In November, at the Tour Championships, she was named the inaugural winner of the Whirlpool 6th Sense Player of the Year, which honors the player who has demonstrated the most sixth sense intuition, that is to say "heightened intelligence, unbeatable performance and pinpoint precision".

=== 2006: All four Slam finals ===
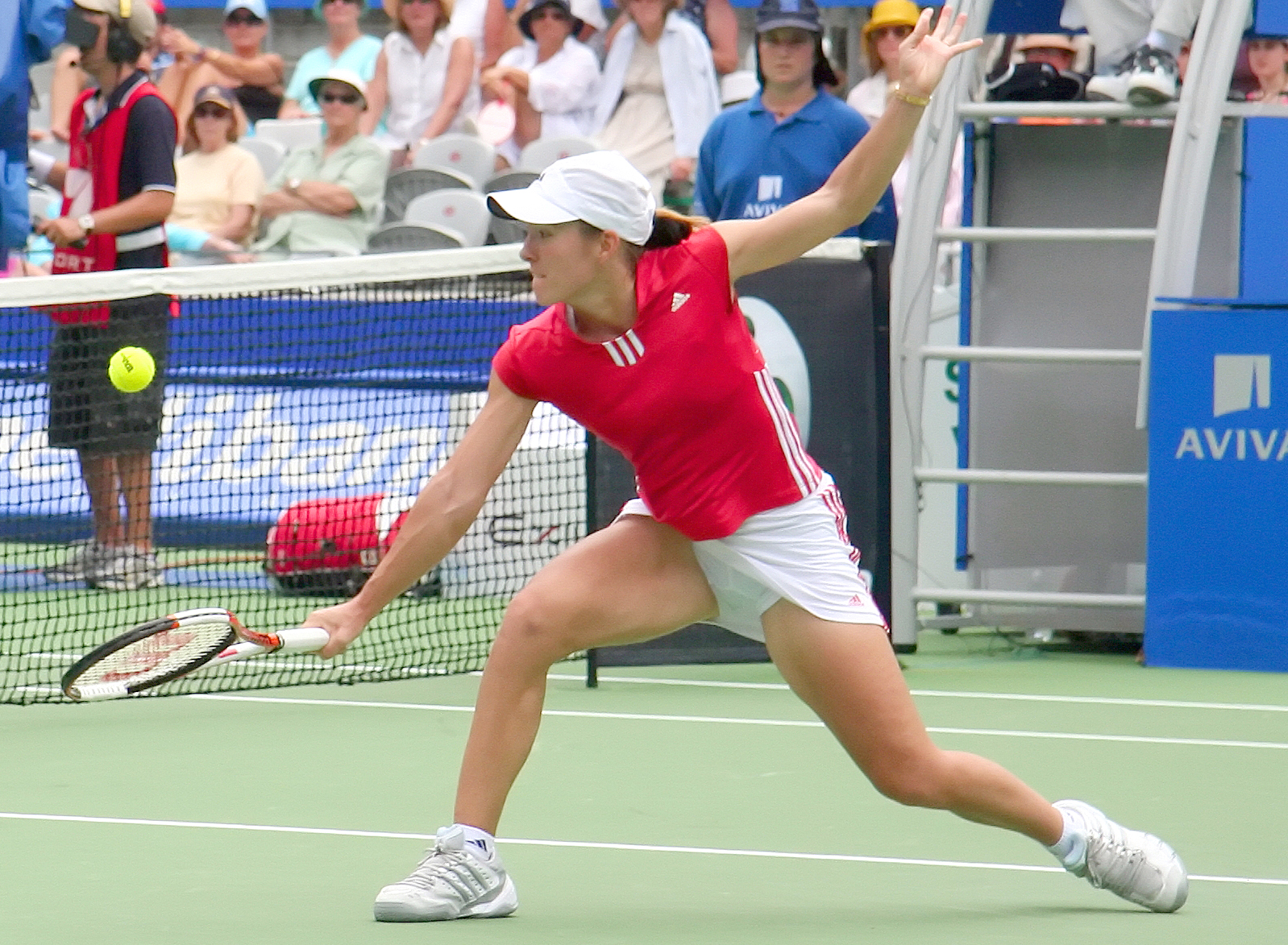
Justine Henin at the 2006 Medibank International in Sydney

In January, Henin returned to competitive tennis at the tournament in Sydney, a tune-up for the Australian Open. She was seeded fifth and played former world No. 1 (and newly returned to competitive tennis) Martina Hingis in a much hyped first round match. Henin won 6–3, 6–3.

At the Australian Open, Henin defeated top-ranked Lindsay Davenport and fourth ranked Maria Sharapova in three-set matches to set up a final against third ranked Amélie Mauresmo. While trailing 6–1, 2–0, Henin retired from the match, citing intense stomach pain caused by over-use of anti-inflammatories for a persistent shoulder injury. Henin stated afterwards that she feared possible injury had she continued to play. Henin was criticized by the press because she had stated after her semifinal win against Sharapova that she was at the "peak of her fitness" and was playing the "best tennis of her life". This was only the fourth time that a Grand Slam women's singles final ended by retirement since 1900, and the first ever during the open era.

Henin captured her second title of the year at the Tier II event in Dubai defeating Sharapova 7–5, 6–2. This was her third Dubai title, having won previously in 2003 and 2004. At Tier I Pacific Life Open in Indian Wells, Henin lost in the semifinals to fourth-seeded Elena Dementieva 6–2, 5–7, 5–7, after leading 6–2, 5–2 and serving for the match twice. Henin also lost in the second round of Tier I Miami Masters to Meghann Shaughnessy 5–7, 4–6.

On clay, she failed to retain her title at the Family Circle Cup, losing in the semifinals to third-seeded Patty Schnyder 6–2, 3–6, 2–6. It was her first career defeat at this tournament and the end of her 27-match winning streak on clay. Henin then helped Belgium defeat defending champion Russia in a Fed Cup quarterfinal. She beat fifth ranked Nadia Petrova 6–7, 6–4, 6–3, and 9th ranked Elena Dementieva 6–2, 6–0. Petrova had come into the tie with two consecutive clay court tournament victories and a ten-match clay court winning streak, while Dementieva had defeated Henin in their last meeting in Indian Wells and defeated second ranked Belgian compatriot Kim Clijsters on the first day of the tie. Three weeks later, Henin played the Tier I Qatar Telecom German Open, defeating Mauresmo in the semifinal 6–1, 6–2 before losing to Petrova in a three-set final.

At the French Open, Henin defeated second seeded Clijsters in the semifinals 6–3, 6–2. She then defeated Kuznetsova in the final to win her third French Open singles title in four years. Henin captured the title without losing a set and became the first French Open champion to defend her title successfully since Steffi Graf in 1996.

At the Eastbourne grass court tournament just before Wimbledon, Henin defeated Anastasia Myskina in the final in three sets.

Henin was the third seed going into Wimbledon and advanced to her third consecutive Grand Slam final without losing a set. She defeated Clijsters (who was seeded second) in a semifinal 6–4, 7–6^{(4)} but lost the final to Mauresmo. The final featured two finesse players who used their all-court games, a break from recent years that featured a succession of power baseliners claiming the title. At almost every point throughout the match, both players approached the net to volley. Tipped as the tournament favorite, Henin won the first set. But Mauresmo recovered to win the next two sets and her second Grand Slam singles title and deny the Belgian a career Grand Slam. This was the only Wimbledon final of the decade that did not involve Venus and/or Serena Williams.

Henin withdrew from Tier I events in San Diego and Montreal because of injury but played the tournament in New Haven. There, she defeated Kuznetsova and Davenport en route to the title. It was her 28th WTA tour title. She returned to the world No. 2 ranking and crossed over US$12 million in career prize money.

At the US Open, Maria Sharapova defeated Henin in the final after Henin had defeated Lindsey Davenport in the quarterfinals and Jelena Janković in the semifinals. Henin became the first woman since Hingis in 1997 to reach the finals of all four Grand Slam singles tournaments in a calendar year.

Henin won both of her singles matches during the Fed Cup final against Italy in Charleroi. However, Henin retired from the deciding doubles match because of a knee injury while she and her partner Kirsten Flipkens were trailing 3–6, 6–2, 2–0, giving Italy the championship.

Henin guaranteed her year-end world No. 1 ranking by reaching the final of the Sony Ericsson Championships, defeating Maria Sharapova in the semifinals 6–2, 7–6^{(5)}. Henin then defeated Mauresmo and won the tournament for the first time in her career.

Henin was the first player since Hingis in 2000 to win the WTA Tour Championships and end the year as the top-ranked player. Henin was the first woman to win at least one Grand Slam singles title in four consecutive years since Steffi Graf from 1993 through 1996. Her prize money earnings for the year totaled $4,204,810.

=== 2007: Dominance ===
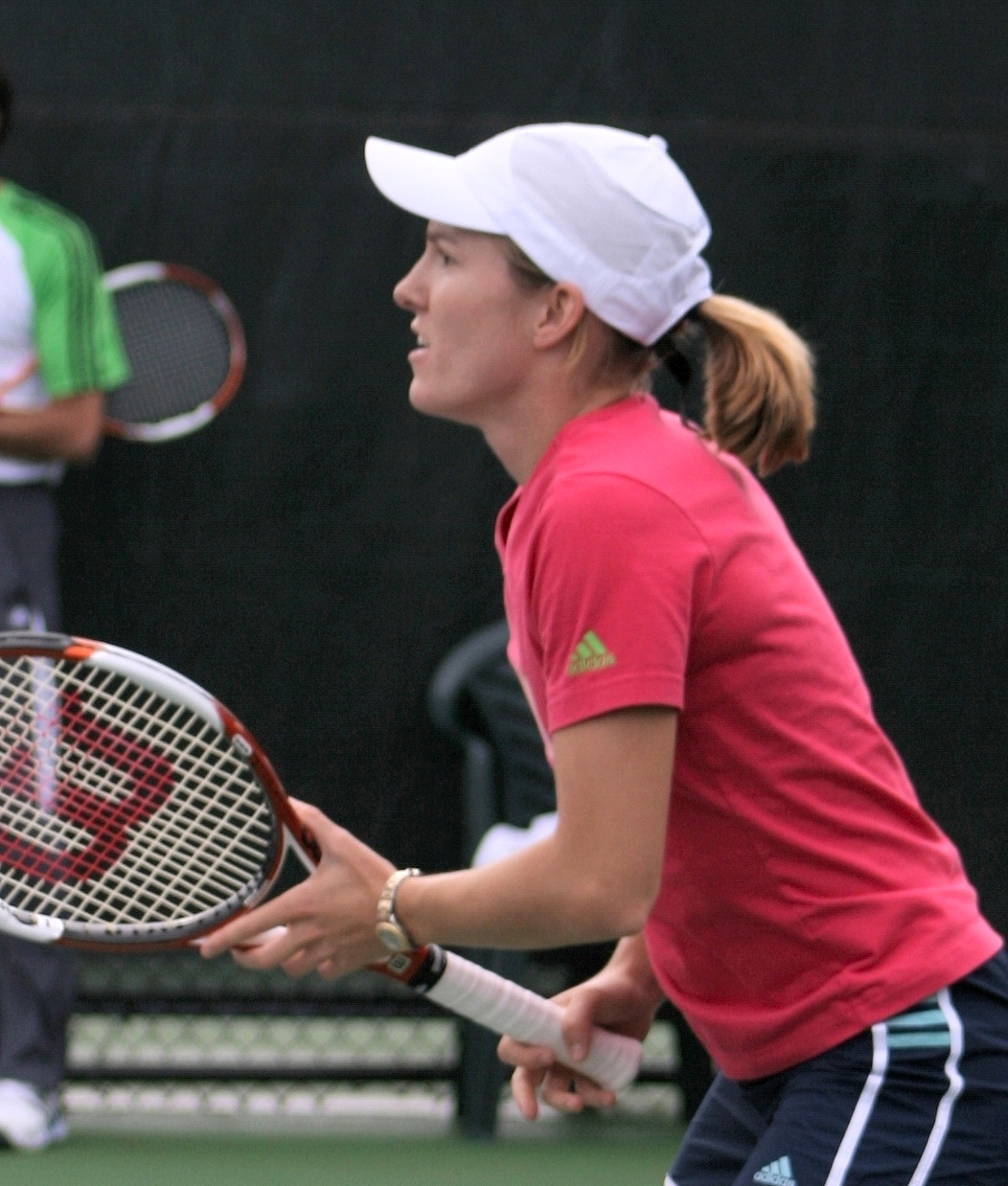
Justine Henin during the 2007 Sony Ericsson Open

On 4 January 2007, Henin withdrew from the Australian Open and the warm-up tournament in Sydney to deal with the break-up of her marriage. Not playing those tournaments caused Henin to lose the world No. 1 ranking to Maria Sharapova.

In Henin's first tournament of the year, she lost in the semifinals of the Open Gaz de France in Paris to Czech Lucie Šafářová 6–7^{(5)}, 4–6. She then won two hardcourt tournaments in the Middle East, the Dubai Duty Free Women's Open (for the fourth time in five years) over Amélie Mauresmo and her first Qatar Total Open title, defeating Svetlana Kuznetsova in the final. She also reached US$14 million in career prize money and on 19 March, regained the world No. 1 ranking.

At the Miami Masters, Henin reached the final for the first time in her career, where she lost to Serena Williams 6–0, 5–7, 3–6 after holding two match points at 6–0, 5–4. Her next tournament was the J&S Cup in Warsaw, which she won, beating Alona Bondarenko of Ukraine in the final, 6–1, 6–3. Later, at the Qatar Telecom German Open in Berlin, Henin won her quarterfinal against Jelena Janković 3–6, 6–4, 6–4 after being behind 4–0 in the third set, only to lose her semifinal against Kuznetsova 4–6, 7–5, 4–6. The loss was only her second to Kuznetsova in 16 career meetings.

At the French Open, Henin was the two-time defending champion and top seed. In a highly anticipated quarterfinal match against Serena Williams, Henin won 6–4, 6–3. She then defeated Janković in the semifinals 6–2, 6–2. In the final, Henin defeated Ana Ivanovic in straight sets, 6–1, 6–2 to claim her third consecutive French Open title, equalling Seles's open era record. She also surpassed US$15 million in career prize money earnings. Henin won the tournament without dropping a set and had not lost a set at this tournament since the 2005 French Open quarterfinals. She had not lost a match at the French Open since 2004. This proved to be the last successful women's singles title defense at the French Open in next 16 years, until Iga Świątek defended her title in 2023.

The International Women's Open in Eastbourne was Henin's first grass court tournament of the year. She and Mauresmo reached the final, which was the first time in nearly 30 years that the Eastbourne final included both finalists from Wimbledon the previous year. Henin recovered from a breakdown in the final set to win in a third-set tiebreak for the second consecutive year.

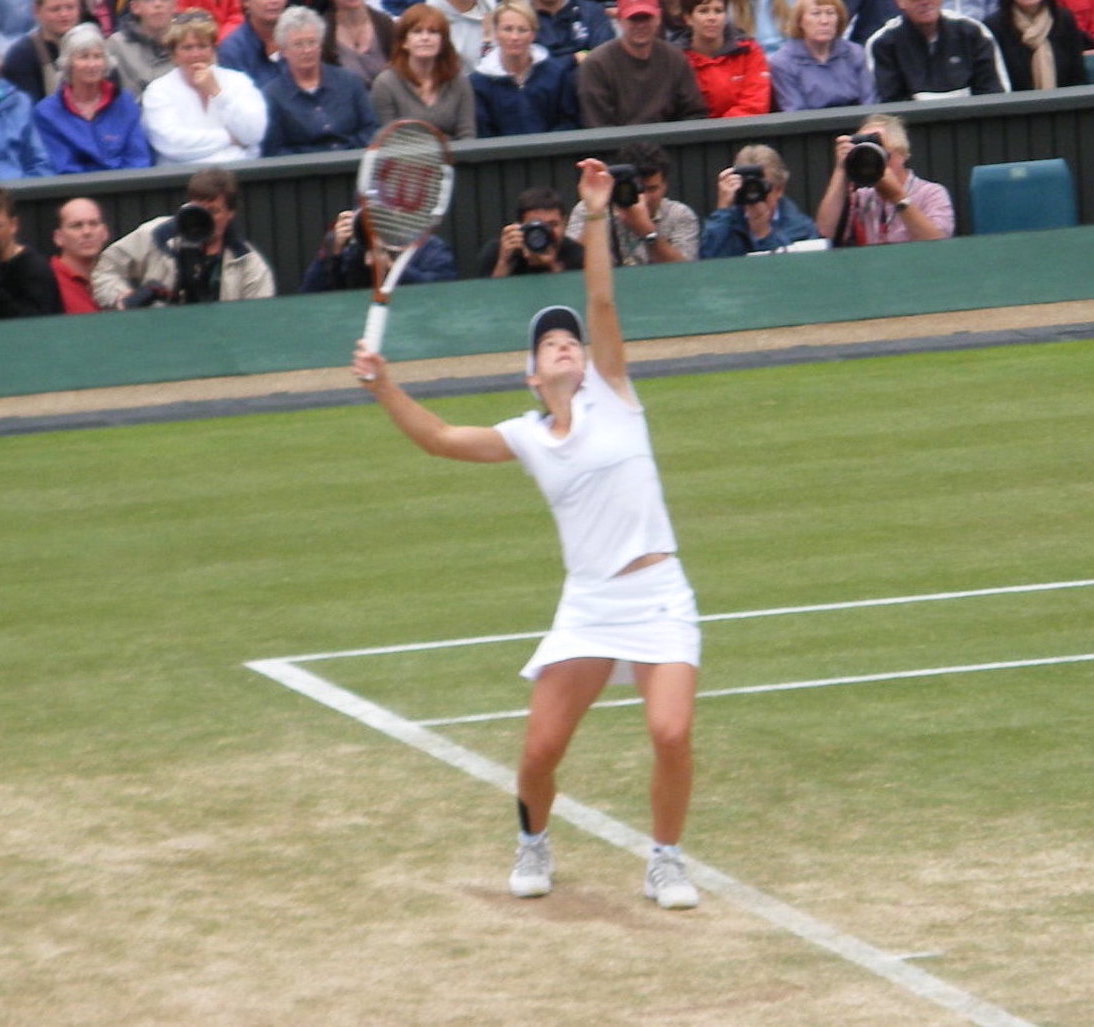
At the 2007 Wimbledon

At Wimbledon, Henin lost to Marion Bartoli in the semifinals 6–1, 5–7, 1–6, one day after Henin defeated Serena Williams in the quarterfinals. It was Henin's first win over the American on a surface other than clay. In the semifinal, she was up a break at 1–0 and 4–3 in the second set, but could not hold the lead.

In August, Henin won the Tier I Rogers Cup in Toronto, defeating Janković in the final. The tournament championship was her 35th on the WTA tour, moving her past Clijsters who retired with 34 tournament championships.

At the US Open, Henin defeated her first four opponents in straight sets, with a 6–0 set in each match. Henin then faced Serena Williams in the quarterfinals for the third consecutive time in a Grand Slam tournament, and for the third time, Henin won, 7–6^{(3)}, 6–1. In the semifinals against Venus Williams, Henin was up a break in the first set but could not hold it. She finally won the set in a tiebreak. In the second set, Henin was ahead 3–0 before Williams leveled the set at 3–3. Williams then had three break points on Henin's service but could not convert and lost the game. Henin then broke Williams's serve and held her own serve to go up 5–3. Williams then broke Henin to pull within 5–4 but Henin broke Williams again in the last game to win the match 7–6^{(2)}, 6–4. Henin became only the second player to defeat both Williams sisters in the same Grand Slam tournament (after Martina Hingis at the 2001 Australian Open). In the final, Henin won her second US Open singles title, defeating Kuznetsova in straight sets, 6–1, 6–3. Henin won the tournament without dropping a set. She thus became the first women ever to defeat both Williams sisters in the same Grand Slam tournament, and go on to also win the title (Hingis had lost to Jennifer Capriati in the final of the 2001 Australian Open).

Henin won her next tournament, the Porsche Tennis Grand Prix, defeating Tatiana Golovin in the final. Two weeks later, Henin won the Zurich Open, her ninth title of the year, by again defeating Golovin in the final.

At the WTA Tour Championships, Henin won all three of her round robin matches, defeating Anna Chakvetadze, Janković, and Bartoli. Going into the match against Bartoli, Henin had won 22 consecutive matches since Bartoli defeated her in the 2007 Wimbledon semifinals. Although Henin had already clinched a spot in the semifinals, both Henin and Bartoli did not know Bartoli had to replace Serena Williams until several hours before the match and lost 6–0, 6–0. In the semifinals, Henin defeated Ivanovic 6–4, 6–4. In the final, Henin overcame Sharapova in three sets in a match that lasted 3 hours, 24 minutes. Sharapova won the first set on her eighth set point in the 12-minute last game. Henin won the match on her fifth match point in the final game of the match. This was Henin's longest ever match, the longest final in tournament history, and the twelfth longest women's match ever.

This victory extended Henin's winning streak to 25 matches. She only lost three sets after Wimbledon. This victory made her the sixth player to successfully defend her title at the WTA's season-ending championship and the first player to claim at least ten tour titles in a year since Hingis won twelve in 1997. She also became the first woman to break the US$5 million barrier in prize money in a year, and by crossing US$19 million, Henin is now ranked fifth on the all time prize money list.

Henin ended the year ranked world No. 1 for the third time in her career, having done so previously in 2003 and 2006. She was the first player since Lindsay Davenport to end the year ranked world No. 1 consecutively for two years (Davenport was ranked year-end world No. 1 in 2004–2005). She also ended the year with a 63–4 record, having lost to only four players: Lucie Šafářová, Serena Williams, Svetlana Kuznetsova and Marion Bartoli. Her winning percentage of 94% was the best since Steffi Graf's 1995 season (Serena Williams surpassed her in 2013 with 95%).

=== 2008: Retirement ===
Henin started the year as the world No. 1. 14 January marked Henin's 100th career week as world No. 1, and on 10 March, Henin became only the seventh female player to be ranked world No. 1 for 12 consecutive months.

The Medibank International in Sydney was Henin's first tournament of the year. She defeated Ana Ivanovic in the semifinals 6–2, 2–6, 6–4. She then defeated world No. 2, Svetlana Kuznetsova, 4–6, 6–2, 6–4, overcoming an 0–3 deficit in the final set.

At the Australian Open in Melbourne, Henin won her 32nd consecutive match in the fourth round, defeating Hsieh Su-wei of Taiwan 6–2, 6–2. The winning streak ended in the quarterfinals when Sharapova, the eventual winner, defeated Henin 6–4, 6–0. This was Henin's first 6–0 loss since the 2002 French Open and the first time since the 2005 US Open that Henin had been defeated in Grand Slam singles before the semifinals.

At the Proximus Diamond Games in Antwerp, Henin defeated Karin Knapp in the final. This was Henin's second singles title in her native Belgium. Two weeks later at the Barclays Dubai Tennis Championships, Henin was the defending champion but lost for the first time in eight meetings to Francesca Schiavone in the quarterfinals 7–6^{(3)}, 7–6^{(4)}. Henin had struggled for three hours in her first match against Katarina Srebotnik, eventually winning 7–5, 6–7, 6–3.

After taking a four-week break, Henin's next tournament was the Miami Masters. She lost in the quarterfinals to Serena Williams 2–6, 0–6. Henin then withdrew from the Tier I Family Circle Cup because of an injury to her right knee.

At the Tier I, clay court Qatar Telecom German Open in Berlin, Henin lost in the third round to Dinara Safina 7–5, 3–6, 1–6, in what turned out to be her last match before retirement. In their five previous career matches, Henin had never lost a set to Safina. The day after her defeat, Henin withdrew from the Tier I Internazionali BNL d'Italia in Rome, citing fatigue.

Henin announced her immediate retirement from professional tennis on 14 May 2008, and requested the WTA to remove her name from the rankings immediately. Her announcement was a surprise because Henin was still ranked world No. 1 and was considered the favorite for the French Open, where she would have been the three-time defending champion. She said she felt no sadness about her retirement because she believed it was a release from a game she had focused on for twenty years. She also said that in the future, she would be concentrating on charity and her tennis school.

=== 2010: Comeback ===
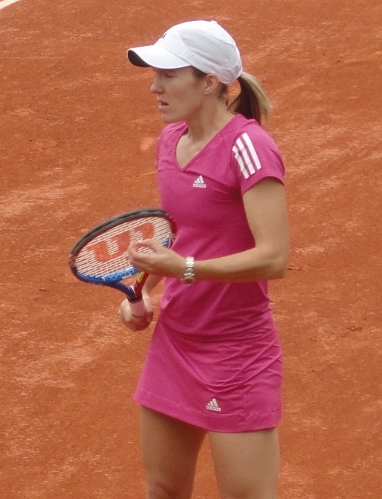
Henin at the 2010 French Open

Belgian newspaper L'Avenir reported on Tuesday 22 September 2009 that Henin would formally announce her return to competitive tennis after 16 months of retirement. Later that day, she confirmed her return to competition. Henin mentioned seeing Roger Federer finally complete the grand slam of titles by winning the French Open in 2009 had been an inspiration, as had Kim Clijsters' return to the tour and her victory at the US Open.

Henin made her return to tennis at the Brisbane International where she was given a wildcard. She defeated No. 2 seed Nadia Petrova, Sesil Karatantcheva, No. 7 seed Melinda Czink and No. 3 seed Ana Ivanovic to make it to the final. She then nearly won, losing to her compatriot Clijsters in a riveting final, 3–6, 6–4, 6–7^{(6)} lasting 2 hours, 23 minutes. At one point, Henin was up 3–0 in the third set before Clijsters rallied and took the match to a tie break. Down 1–5 in the tiebreak, she fought back to 6-all before Clijsters took the final two points.

At the 2010 Australian Open, Henin was given a wildcard as an unranked player. Henin started off with a straight sets victory over Belgian Kirsten Flipkens. She set up a second round match of the tournament with No. 5 seed Elena Dementieva, whom she defeated 7–5, 7–6^{(5)}. Lasting two hours and fifty minutes, commentators felt this match was worthy of a final. Henin approached the net forty-three times, winning thirty-five of those points. In the third round, she defeated No. 28 seed Alisa Kleybanova from Russia; where she made a comeback to win 3–6, 6–4, 6–2. In the fourth round she faced World No. 16 and fellow Belgian, Yanina Wickmayer, defeating her in three sets 7–6, 1–6, 6–3. She then defeated No. 19 seed Nadia Petrova in the quarterfinals. Henin won 7–6, 7–5 after having been down 0–3 in the second set. She then went on to defeat Zheng Jie from China in the semifinals in convincing fashion 6–1, 6–0, setting up a clash with world No. 1 Serena Williams in the 2010 Australian Open ladies' final. This was the first time in their long rivalry that Henin and Serena Williams met in a Grand Slam final. Henin would eventually fall to Serena Williams in three sets 6–4, 3–6, 6–2.

A wildcard was granted for Henin to compete at the BNP Paribas Open in Indian Wells, a Premier Mandatory tournament. In the first round, Henin defeated Magdaléna Rybáriková 6–2, 6–2 in a little over an hour. Henin then lost to Gisela Dulko, 2–6, 6–1, 4–6, in a two-hour match. The result gave her a new rank of world No. 33 as of 22 March 2010. She defeated Jill Craybas of US 6–2, 6–2 in the first round of Sony Ericsson Open. In the second round, Henin defeated world No. 6, Elena Dementieva, 6–3, 6–2 in 90 minutes. In the third round, Henin defeated Dominika Cibulková in 93 minutes, 6–4, 6–4 advancing to the quarterfinals where Henin beat Vera Zvonareva 6–1, 6–4 to set up a meeting in the quarterfinals with world No. 2, Caroline Wozniacki. After defeating Wozniacki in a three-set match, she fell to Kim Clijsters in a semifinal battle, 2–6, 7–6^{(3)}, 6–7^{(6)}. Following her Sony Ericsson Open performance, Henin moved into the top 25 for the first time since her comeback.

Henin's next tournament was the Porsche Tennis Grand Prix in Stuttgart. Henin played through this tournament injured, having previously broken her left pinkie during Fed Cup practice. In the first round, Henin saw off German qualifier Julia Görges 7–6^{(3)}, 6–1. In her second round, she defeated world No. 12 and fellow Belgian Yanina Wickmayer, defeating her for the 2nd consecutive time, 6–3, 7–5. In the quarterfinals, she defeated fourth seed and world No. 7 Jelena Janković 3–6, 7–6^{(4)}, 6–3 for the tenth time in her career. She defeated world No. 20 Shahar Pe'er in the semifinals, 6–3, 6–2, and reached her third final in five tournaments this year. She faced world No. 10 Samantha Stosur. Henin won the final 6–4, 2–6, 6–1 in 100 minutes, to procure her first title in 2010 (in her 3rd final). Winning this tournament also sent Henin into the top 20 for the first time since her comeback.

At the Madrid Open she was defeated in the first round by eventual champion Aravane Rezaï 4–6, 7–5, 6–0. As a result of this loss, Henin dropped out of the top 20 to No. 23. Henin then participated at the French Open, seeded 22nd, the second grand slam of the year where she had won four previous titles. In the 1st round, she defeated Tsvetana Pironkova in 89 minutes, 6–4, 6–3. In the second round, Henin faced Klára Zakopalová and defeated her 6–3, 6–3. In the third round, facing former world No. 1 Maria Sharapova, Henin ended her streak of consecutive sets at 40, losing the 2nd set to Sharapova but going on to win 6–2, 3–6, 6–3. She had then tied the number of consecutive sets won at the French Open with Helen Wills Moody. She lost to world No. 7 Samantha Stosur 6–2, 1–6, 4–6 in the fourth round, her first defeat at Roland Garros since 2004.

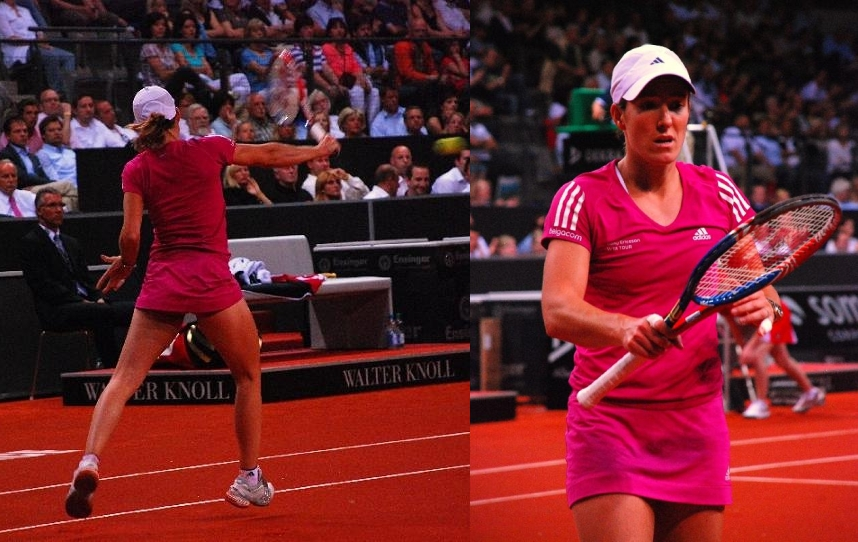
Justine Henin winning the 2010 Stuttgart Porsche Cup

Henin began the grass court season at the UNICEF Open, where she was the top seed for the first time since her return. In the first three rounds she defeated Angelique Kerber, Roberta Vinci, and Kristina Barrois in straight sets. She then beat No. 5 seed Alexandra Dulgheru in the semifinals, 6–2, 6–2. In the final, she defeated No. 7 seed Andrea Petkovic to win her 43rd career title and second of the year.

At the Wimbledon Championships, Henin was the No. 17 seed. In the third round, she had a victory over Nadia Petrova, winning 6–1, 6–4. She was eventually defeated in the fourth round by Kim Clijsters 2–6, 6–2, 6–3, after convincingly winning the first set. Midway through the first set, Henin slipped on the court, injuring her right elbow. Further examinations revealed a partial ligament fracture in her elbow, causing her to end her 2010 season prematurely. She was awarded the WTA Comeback Player of the Year award in December for her 2010 season.

=== 2011: Second retirement ===
Henin started her season at the Hopman Cup. She did not lose any sets in the competition, earning comfortable victories over Alicia Molik from Australia, Sesil Karatantcheva from Kazakhstan, Ana Ivanovic of Serbia and Bethanie Mattek-Sands of the US in the final.

Henin was the 11th seed and a defending finalist at the Australian Open. Henin defeated Sania Mirza from India in the first round 5–7, 6–3, 6–1 and Elena Baltacha in the second, 6–1, 6–3. She then fell to 23rd seed Svetlana Kuznetsova, 4–6, 6–7^{(8)}.

On 26 January 2011, Henin announced her definitive retirement from professional tennis, due to an exacerbation of the elbow injury she sustained the previous year at Wimbledon.

== Playing style ==
At the 2007 French Open, Martina Navratilova said that "Henin's offense is just phenomenal ... it's sort of like we've got 'the female Federer', or maybe the guys have 'the male Justine Henin', because she is just head and shoulders above everyone else right now." Her footwork, balance, and court coverage—and she is adept at changing from a defensive style to an aggressive one. Compared to the rest of her game, Henin's serve was rather inconsistent. Her tendency to take risks on her second serve could sometimes result in a high number of double faults. When she first came onto the tour, Henin used a pinpoint stance (most common among the WTA) for serving, but later retooled her serve to use a platform stance, which is most common among male players. Nonetheless, despite her relatively small size, Henin was capable of producing powerful first serves, her fastest one being clocked at 196 km/h (122 mph) at the 2005 Family Circle Cup. Henin's single-handed backhand was the most powerful and accurate in the game. She could hit her backhand flat, with heavy topspin, or slice [underspin]. Her backhand could also be used to surprise her opponents with drop shots, breaking up the pattern of a groundstroke rally. Her forehand was generally regarded as her most dangerous weapon, and the stroke that she normally used to dictate play in a match. It was underrated as most only spoke of her backhand, but particularly in her dominant years of 2003 and 2007, she would dominate the tone of matches with her huge and versatile forehand.

A notable aspect of Henin's playing style was the completeness of her game—the variety and versatility she had. Her style was often compared to that of Roger Federer and to five-time Grand Slam winner Martina Hingis as well. Four-time Grand Slam winner Kim Clijsters commented "Growing up together, she's always been the more touchy player. She has good hands ... she has those quick hands." Former world No. 1 Andy Roddick praised Henin's and Hingis's racket skills, saying "She has probably the best racket skills of any female player I’ve seen, maybe her [Hingis] and Justine." Hingis herself also similarly said "Players were better educated [during my career]. Now it's sheer power. You kind of miss the players like myself or Justine Henin."

Henin was criticized for questionable sportsmanship during her tennis career, most notably at the 2006 Australian Open final and during a match against Serena Williams at the 2003 French Open. These incidents involved claims of dishonesty and questionable tactics that drew criticism from fans, rivals, and commentators.

=== One-handed (topspin) backhand ===
In a period where two-handed backhands were common in professional tennis, what distinguished Henin was her use of a one-handed backhand. The advantage of a one-handed backhands is that it has more reach, can be varied, and can produce spin on the ball. John McEnroe called Henin's one-handed backhand "the best in men's or women's tennis.

=== Volleying ability ===
Henin, who had always been considered one of the better volleyers on tour —a player with an all court game — soon established herself as one of the best in the modern era. Two-time US Open Champion Tracy Austin commented, "At the net she's quite comfortable displaying excellent technique. She knows where to position herself—a contrast to many other players who get up to the net and look like a deer in headlights." Renowned tennis coach Nick Bollettieri included Henin as one of the few female tennis players he regarded as being a successful volleyer and an adept serve-and-volleyer, alongside the likes of Martina Navratilova and Jana Novotná.

== Personal life ==
On 16 November 2002, Henin married Pierre-Yves Hardenne in the Château de Lavaux-Sainte-Anne, and officially adopted the name Henin-Hardenne. On 4 January 2007, she withdrew from forthcoming tournaments including the Australian Open due to personal issues. She confirmed three weeks later that she had officially separated from her husband. The same year, she reverted to using the name Henin. In the meantime, following a conflict between Henin and her father over her tennis career and her relationship with Pierre-Yves Hardenne, Carlos Rodríguez became not only her trainer and coach, but in ways a second father figure for the duration of her active tennis career.

Since March 2011, Henin has been in a relationship with Benoît Bertuzzo, a Belgian film director and actor, and secretly married him in March 2015. On 12 September 2012, Henin announced that she was pregnant, giving birth to a girl in 2013. In 2017, she gave birth to a second child, a son.

=== Public life and endorsements ===
Henin has worn apparel manufactured by Adidas and used Wilson racquets for her tournaments. Uncharacteristically for a tennis pro, Henin always used to wear her sponsorship provided Rolex wristwatch even during matches. Later on this habit would be replicated by others on the tour, including Rafael Nadal and Serena Williams.

In May 2007, Henin and her coach Carlos Rodríguez started the Academy 6th Sense. At the 2009 US Open – Girls' doubles the Ukrainian tennis player Maryna Zanevska became the first "6th Sense player" to win a Junior Grand Slam title.

On 30 November 2007, Henin opened her own tennis academy Club Justine N1 (in French, "N1" is pronounced almost identically to "Henin").

After retiring, Henin became involved in two Belgian reality shows in 2009. In May, she starred in De Twaalf Werken van Justine Henin – Les 12 travaux de Justine Henin (The 12 Labours of Justine Henin). The show followed Henin as she completed 12 personal challenges. In June 2009, she hosted a musical TV show that revolved around Belgian-Italian singer Lara Fabian.

== Career statistics ==
=== Grand Slam tournament performance timelines ===
Key
**W**	F	SF	QF	#R	RR	Q#	DNQ	A	NH

(W) winner; (F) finalist; (SF) semifinalist; (QF) quarterfinalist; (#R) rounds 4, 3, 2, 1; (RR) round-robin stage; (Q#) qualification round; (DNQ) did not qualify; (A) absent; (NH) not held; (SR) strike rate (events won / competed); (W–L) win–loss record.

==== Singles ====
Tournament	1999	2000	2001	2002	2003	2004	2005	2006	2007	2008	2009	2010	2011	SR	W–L	Win %
Australian Open	A	2R	4R	QF	SF	**W**	A	F	A	QF	A	F	3R	1 / 9	38–8	83%
French Open	2R	A	SF	1R	**W**	2R	**W**	**W**	**W**	A	A	4R	A	4 / 9	38–5	88%
Wimbledon	A	1R	F	SF	SF	A	1R	F	SF	A	A	4R	A	0 / 8	30–8	79%
US Open	1R	4R	4R	4R	**W**	4R	4R	F	**W**	A	A	A	A	2 / 9	35–7	83%
**Win–loss**	**1–2**	**4–3**	**17–4**	**12–4**	**24–2**	**11–2**	**10–2**	**25–3**	**19–1**	**4–1**	**0–0**	**12–3**	**2–1**	**7 / 35**	**141–28**	**83%**

=== Grand Slam tournament finals ===
==== Singles: 12 (7 titles, 5 runner-ups) ====
Result	Year	Tournament	Surface	Opponent	Score
Loss	2001	Wimbledon	Grass	(United States) Venus Williams	1–6, 6–3, 0–6
Win	2003	French Open (1)	Clay	(Belgium) Kim Clijsters	6–0, 6–4
Win	2003	US Open (1)	Hard	(Belgium) Kim Clijsters	7–5, 6–1
Win	2004	Australian Open (1)	Hard	(Belgium) Kim Clijsters	6–3, 4–6, 6–3
Win	2005	French Open (2)	Clay	(France) Mary Pierce	6–1, 6–1
Loss	2006	Australian Open	Hard	(France) Amélie Mauresmo	1–6, 0–2 ret.
Win	2006	French Open (3)	Clay	(Russia) Svetlana Kuznetsova	6–4, 6–4
Loss	2006	Wimbledon	Grass	(France) Amélie Mauresmo	6–2, 3–6, 4–6
Loss	2006	US Open	Hard	(Russia) Maria Sharapova	4–6, 4–6
Win	2007	French Open (4)	Clay	(Serbia) Ana Ivanovic	6–1, 6–2
Win	2007	US Open (2)	Hard	(Russia) Svetlana Kuznetsova	6–1, 6–3
Loss	2010	Australian Open	Hard	(United States) Serena Williams	4–6, 6–3, 2–6

=== Year-end championships (WTA Finals) ===
Singles: 2 (2 titles)

Result	Year	Tournament	Surface	Opponent	Score
Win	2006	WTA Finals	Hard (i)	(France) Amélie Mauresmo	6-4, 6–3
Win	2007	WTA Finals	Hard (i)	(Russia) Maria Sharapova	5–7, 7–5, 6–3

=== Records ===
==== Open era records ====
- Records in **bold** indicate peer-less achievements.

Championship	Years	Record accomplished	Player tied
French Open	2005–2007	3 consecutive singles titles	Monica Seles; Iga Świątek
**French Open**	**2006, 2007**	**2 titles without losing a set**	**Stands alone**
French Open	2005–2010	40 consecutive sets won at the French Open.	Helen Wills Moody
Grand Slam	2006	reached all four Grand Slam finals in a calendar year	Margaret Court; Chris Evert; Martina Navratilova; Steffi Graf; Monica Seles; Martina Hingis
Grand Slam	2007	2 titles without losing a set in the same calendar year	Billie Jean King; Martina Navratilova; Steffi Graf; Martina Hingis; Serena Williams

==== Other records ====
- She is the only female player in the decade of 2000 to 2009 to reach the title match of all four grand slams at least twice.

== Awards and honors ==
2001

- Belgian National Sports Merit Award

2002

- UEPS European Sportswoman of the Year

2003

- Belgian Sportswoman of the Year
- ITF World Champion
- UEPS European Sportswoman of the Year
- ISK Sportswoman of the Year
- Dame Grand Cross in the Order of the Crown, by Royal Decree of H.M. King Albert II

2004

- WTA Player of the Year (for 2003)
- Belgian Sportswoman of the Year

2005

- Family Circle/State Farm "Player Who Makes A Difference"
- Whirlpool 6th Sense Player of the Year

2006

- Appointed UNESCO Champion for Sport
- ITF World Champion.
- Belgian Sportswoman of the Year
- Member of the Belgian Sporting Team of the Year (Fed Cup team)
- UEPS European Sportswoman of the Year
- Sports Merit Award of the French Community of Belgium

2007

- Whirlpool 6th Sense Player of the Year
- Belgian Sportswoman of the Year
- Belgian Sports Personality of the Year (career award)
- ITF World Champion
- USSA Female Athlete of the Year
- EFE Sportsperson of the Year
- UEPS European Sportswoman of the Year
- La Gazzetta dello Sport Sportswoman of the Year

2008

- Laureus World Sportswoman of the Year
- WTA Player of the Year (for 2007)

2009

- Sports Illustrated 4th Female Athlete of the Decade

2010

- WTA Comeback Player of the Year

2011

- Commander of Walloon Merit

2016

- International Tennis Hall of Fame

2023

- ITF Philippe Chatrier Award

== See also ==
- ATP World Tour records
- Belgium at the 2004 Summer Olympics
- WTA Tour records
- Grand Slam (tennis)
- Overall tennis records – Women's singles
- List of Grand Slam women's singles champions
- List of WTA number 1 ranked singles tennis players
- List of female tennis players
- List of tennis tournaments
- List of tennis rivalries
- Henin – S. Williams rivalry
- Clijsters–Henin rivalry
- Tennis records of the Open Era – Women's singles
- Tennis statistics
- World number 1 women tennis players from 1883–present

Sporting positions
Preceded by Kim Clijsters; Kim Clijsters; Amélie Mauresmo; Maria Sharapova	World No. 1; 20 October 2003 – 26 October 2003; 10 November 2003 – 12 September 2004; 13 November 2006 – 22 January 2007; 19 March 2007 – 19 May 2008	Succeeded by Kim Clijsters; Amélie Mauresmo; Maria Sharapova; Maria Sharapova
Awards and achievements
Preceded by Elena Dementieva	WTA Most Improved Player; 2001	Succeeded by Daniela Hantuchová
Preceded by Serena Williams; Amélie Mauresmo	WTA Player of the Year; 2003; 2007	Succeeded by Maria Sharapova; Serena Williams
Preceded by Serena Williams; Kim Clijsters	ITF World Champion; 2003; 2006-2007	Succeeded by Anastasia Myskina; Jelena Jankovic
Preceded by Sven Nys	Belgian Sports Personality of the Year; 2007	Succeeded by Tia Hellebaut
Preceded by Laure Manaudou	Gazzetta dello Sport; Sportswoman of the Year; 2007	Succeeded by Yelena Isinbayeva
Preceded by Yelena Isinbayeva	World Sportswoman of the Year; 2008	Succeeded by Yelena Isinbayeva
