= 2011 UNICEF Open =

- Date: 12–18 June
- Edition: 22nd
- Category: 250 Series (ATP); Internat. tournaments (WTA)
- Surface: Grass / outdoor
- Location: Rosmalen, 's-Hertogenbosch, Netherlands

Champions

Men's singles
- (Russia) Dmitry Tursunov

Women's singles
- (Italy) Roberta Vinci

Men's doubles
- (Italy) Daniele Bracciali / (Czech Republic) František Čermák

Women's doubles
- (Czech Republic) Barbora Záhlavová-Strýcová / (Czech Republic) Klára Zakopalová
- UNICEF Open

The 2011 UNICEF Open was a tennis tournament played on outdoor grass courts. It was the 22nd edition of the UNICEF Open, and was part of the 250 Series of the 2011 ATP World Tour, and of the WTA International tournaments of the 2011 WTA Tour. Both the men's and the women's events took place at the Autotron park in Rosmalen, 's-Hertogenbosch, Netherlands, from 12 June until 18 June 2011. Dmitry Tursunov and Roberta Vinci won the singles title.

== Finals ==
=== Men's singles ===
(Russia) Dmitry Tursunov defeated (Croatia) Ivan Dodig, 6–3, 6–2

- It was Tursunov's 1st title of the year and 7th of his career.

=== Women's singles ===
(Italy) Roberta Vinci defeated (Australia) Jelena Dokić, 6–7^{(7–9)}, 6–3, 7–5

- It was the 5th title of the career for Roberta Vinci, the 2nd of the year and the first on grass court.

=== Men's doubles ===
(Italy) Daniele Bracciali / (Czech Republic) František Čermák defeated (Sweden) Robert Lindstedt / (Romania) Horia Tecău, 6–3, 2–6, [10–8]

=== Women's doubles ===
(Czech Republic) Barbora Záhlavová-Strýcová / (Czech Republic) Klára Zakopalová defeated (Slovakia) Dominika Cibulková / (Italy) Flavia Pennetta, 1–6, 6–4, [10–7]

== ATP entrants ==
=== Seeds ===
Country	Player	Rank^{*}	Seed
ESP	Nicolás Almagro	15	1
CYP	Marcos Baghdatis	32	2
BEL	Xavier Malisse	40	3
CRO	Ivan Dodig	43	4
ESP	Marcel Granollers	46	5
FIN	Jarkko Nieminen	50	6
URU	Pablo Cuevas	52	7
FRA	Adrian Mannarino	54	8

- Seedings are based on the rankings as of June 6, 2011.

=== Other entrants ===
The following players received wildcards into the main draw:

- (Cyprus) Marcos Baghdatis
- (Netherlands) Jesse Huta Galung
- (Spain) Javier Martí

The following qualified for the main draw:

- (France) Arnaud Clément
- (Colombia) Alejandro Falla
- (Russia) Konstantin Kravchuk
- (France) Ludovic Walter

== WTA entrants ==
=== Seeds ===
Country	Player	Rank^{*}	Seed
BEL	Kim Clijsters	2	1
RUS	Svetlana Kuznetsova	12	2
BEL	Yanina Wickmayer	18	3
ITA	Flavia Pennetta	21	4
SVK	Dominika Cibulková	23	5
RUS	Maria Kirilenko	26	6
ITA	Roberta Vinci	30	7
CZE	Klára Zakopalová	34	8

- Seedings are based on the rankings of June 6, 2011.

=== Other entrants ===
The following players received wildcards into the main draw:

- (Belgium) Kirsten Flipkens
- (United Kingdom) Laura Robson
- (Netherlands) Kiki Bertens

The following players received entry from the qualifying draw:

- (Uzbekistan) Akgul Amanmuradova
- (Italy) Romina Oprandi
- (Netherlands) Arantxa Rus
- (Belgium) Alison van Uytvanck
