= 2011 WTA Tour Championships =

- Date: 25–30 October
- Edition: 41st (singles) / 36th (doubles)
- Draw: 8S / 4D
- Surface: Hard (indoor)
- Location: Istanbul, Turkey
- Venue: Sinan Erdem Dome

Champions

Singles
- (Czech Republic) Petra Kvitová

Doubles
- (United States) Liezel Huber / (United States) Lisa Raymond
- WTA Finals

The 2011 WTA Tour Championships (also known for sponsorship reasons as the 2011 TEB BNP Paribas WTA Championships) was a tennis tournament played at Istanbul, Turkey from October 25 to October 30, 2011. It was the first time Turkey hosted the WTA Tour Championships. It was the 41st edition of the singles event and the 36th edition of the doubles competition. The tournament was held at the Sinan Erdem Dome and was contested by eight singles players and four doubles teams. It was the larger of two season ending championships on the 2011 WTA Tour.

== Finals ==
=== Singles ===
(Czech Republic) Petra Kvitová defeated (Belarus) Victoria Azarenka, 7–5, 4–6, 6–3.

- It was Kvitová's sixth title of the year and seventh of her career. She won the WTA Championship title at her first appearance, closing the year as second in WTA rankings, Azarenka being third.

=== Doubles ===
(United States) Liezel Huber / (United States) Lisa Raymond defeated (Czech Republic) Květa Peschke / (Slovenia) Katarina Srebotnik, 6–4, 6–4.

- Huber and Raymond won their third and fourth Doubles WTA Championship title and the first as a couple, Huber winning paired to Cara Black in 2007 and 2008, Raymond with Samantha Stosur in 2005 and 2006 and Rennae Stubbs back in 2001. Peschke and Srebotnik lost their second WTA Championship final in a row.

== Tournament ==
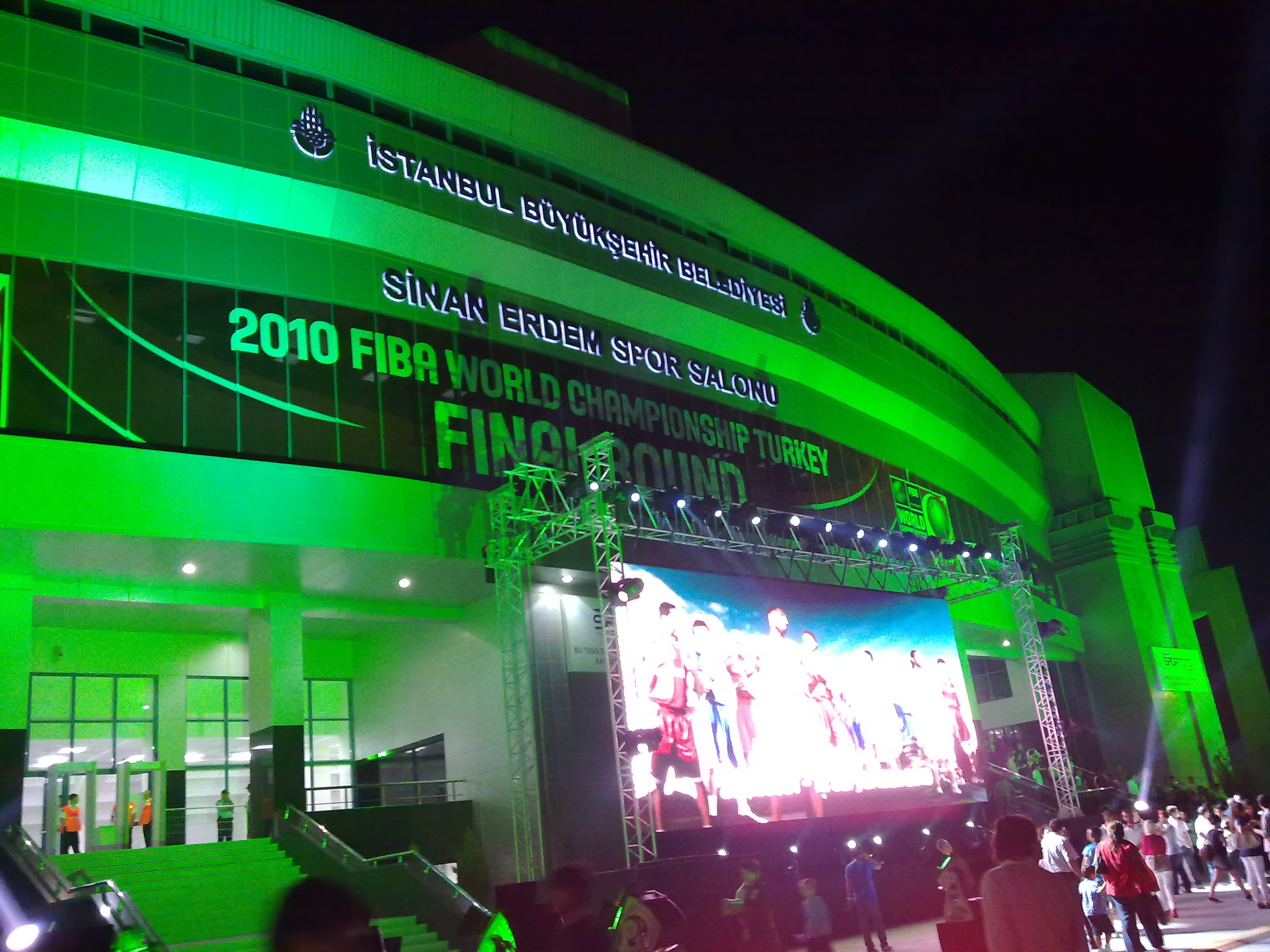
Sinan Erdem Dome hosted the WTA Championships for the first time in 2011.

The 2011 WTA Championships took place at the Sinan Erdem Dome 25–30 October 2011. It was the 41st edition of the event. The tournament was jointly run by the Women's Tennis Association (WTA) and was part of the 2011 WTA Tour. It was the larger of the two season ending championships on the 2011 WTA Tour, the smaller being the Tournament of Champions the following week. The latter is only for players who did not qualify for the WTA Championships.

=== Format ===
The singles event featured eight players and began as a round robin event, with four players in each of two groups called the Red Group and the White Group. Over the first four days of competition, each player met the other three players in their group, with the top two in each group advancing to the semifinals. The first-placed player in one group met the second-placed player in the other group, and vice versa. The winners of each semifinal met in the championship match.

The doubles competition had four teams playing in a straight knockout format from the semifinal stage.

==== Round robin tie-breaking methods ====
The final standings of each group shall be determined by the first of the following methods that apply:

1. Greatest number of wins
2. Greatest number of matches played; or
3. Head-to-head results if only two players are tied, or if three players are tied then:

a. If three players each have the same number of wins, a player having played less than all three matches is automatically eliminated and the player advancing to the single elimination competition is the winner of the match-up of the two remaining tied players; or
b. Highest percentage of sets won; or
c. Highest percentage of games won

== Turkey earthquake 2011 ==
WTA players and TEB BNP Paribas, the title sponsor of the TEB BNP Paribas WTA Championships, made a joint donation of US$250,000 to the Turkish Red Crescent to support the victims of the recent devastating earthquake in Turkey.

Close to 600 people died and more than 2,300 were injured during the country's most powerful earthquake in more than a decade. WTA stars participating in the TEB BNP Paribas WTA Championships donated a percentage of their Championships prize money, which was matched by both the WTA and TEB BNP Paribas.

The Turkish Red Crescent is Turkey's arm of the International Red Cross and Red Crescent Movement, the world's largest humanitarian network. Turkish Red Crescent took immediate action after the earthquake, mobilizing its staff and emergency supplies for thousands of victims.

== Prize money and points ==
The total prize money for the 2011 WTA Championships is 4.9 million United States dollars.

Stage	Singles	Doubles	Points ^{1}
Champion	RR^{2} + $1,295,000	$375,000	RR^{2} + 810
Runner-up	RR^{2} + $435,000	$187,500	RR^{2} + 360
Semifinalist	RR^{2} + $35,000	$93,750	RR^{2}
Round robin (3 wins)	$455,000	–	690
Round robin (2 wins)	$340,000	–	530
Round robin (1 win)	$225,000	–	370
Round robin (0 wins)	$110,000	–	210
Alternates	$50,000	–	

- ^{1} for every match played in the round robin a player gets 70 points automatically, and for each round robin win they get 160 additional points
- ^{2} RR means Prize money or Points won in the round robin Round. RR for doubles is 690

== Qualified players ==
=== Singles ===
Race singles (as of October 24, 2011)
Rk	Player	Points	Tourn	Date Qualified
1	Caroline Wozniacki (DEN)	7,395	21	5 September
2	Maria Sharapova (RUS)	6,370	14	5 September
3	Petra Kvitová (CZE)	5,970	18	1 October
4	Victoria Azarenka (BLR)	5,750	19	1 October
5	Li Na (CHN)	5,351	17	5 October
6	Vera Zvonareva (RUS)	5,190	20	9 October
7	Samantha Stosur (AUS)	5,115	20	9 October
8	Agnieszka Radwańska (POL)	4,940	19	21 October

On September 5, Caroline Wozniacki and Maria Sharapova became the first two players to qualify for the championships.

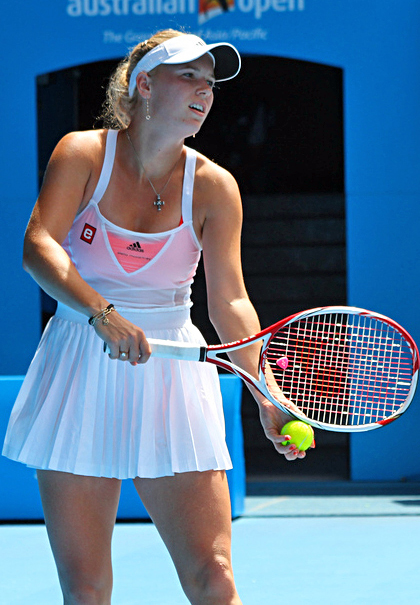
Caroline Wozniacki led the tour with a 62–15 record in 2011

Caroline Wozniacki won six singles titles in 2011. She began the year with a loss at the Medibank International Sydney to Dominika Cibulková. She then reached three consecutive finals at the Dubai Tennis Championships defeating Svetlana Kuznetsova 6–1, 6–3, Qatar Ladies Open losing to Vera Zvonareva 4–6, 4–6, and Indian Wells beating Marion Bartoli 6–1, 2–6, 6–3. Her 3rd title came at the Family Circle Cup, where she won against unseeded Elena Vesnina 6–2, 6–3. She then lost to Julia Görges 6–7^{(3–7)}, 3–6 at the Porsche Tennis Grand Prix. Her 4th and 5th singles title were at the Brussels Open defeating Peng Shuai 2–6, 6–3, 6–3, and her home tournament the e-Boks Sony Ericsson Open defeating Lucie Šafářová 6–1, 6–4. However, she had a 3-match losing streak in the summer season before winning the New Haven Open at Yale against Petra Cetkovská 6–4, 6–1 for the 4th consecutive time. At the Slams, Wozniacki reached the semis of the Australian Open and the US Open, falling to Li Na 3–6, 7–5, 6–3 after failing to convert a match point and Serena Williams 6–2, 6–4 respectively. However, she suffered early exits in the third round of the French Open to Daniela Hantuchová 6–1, 6–3 and the fourth round of the Wimbledon to Dominika Cibulková 1–6, 7–6^{(7–5)}, 7–5. This is her third appearance at the event, with her best result in 2010 when she reached the final.

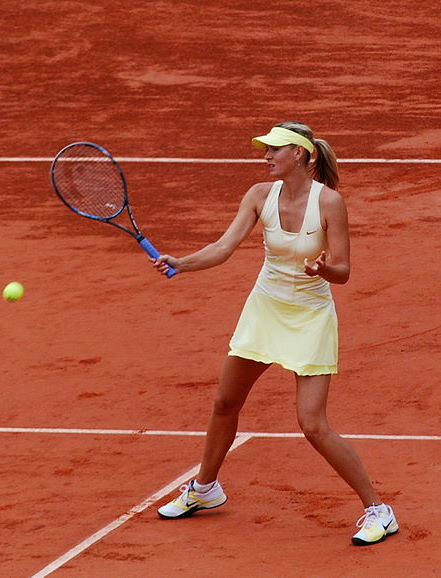
Maria Sharapova qualified for the fifth time

Maria Sharapova regained some of her form by performing consistently throughout the year with two Premier-5 titles. Sharapova was crowned Internazionali BNL d'Italia on red clay, by beating World no. 1 Caroline Wozniacki 7–5, 6–3 in the semis and sixth-seeded Samantha Stosur 6–2, 6–4 in the final. Her second title came at the Western & Southern Open, where she defeated fellow former World No. 1 Jelena Janković 4–6, 7–6^{(7–3)}, 6–3 in two hours and 49 minutes, making it the longest WTA tour final this year. She also made 2 other finals at the Sony Ericsson Open, losing to Victoria Azarenka 1–6, 4–6 and the final of the Wimbledon Championships, losing to Petra Kvitová 3–6, 4–6. This was also her first Grand Slam final appearance since winning the 2008 Australian Open . At the other Slams, Sharapova reached the Semifinals of the French Open, falling to eventual champion Li Na 4–6, 5–7, but fell early in the fourth round of the Australian Open, losing 2–6, 3–6 to Andrea Petkovic, and the third round of the US Open, beaten by Flavia Pennetta 3–6, 6–3, 4–6. This is the first time since 2007 that she has been qualified for the Championships. She has never lost before the semifinals in her previous four appearances, with her best result on her debut at the event, beating Serena Williams in 2004.

On October 1, Petra Kvitová and Victoria Azarenka qualified for the championships.

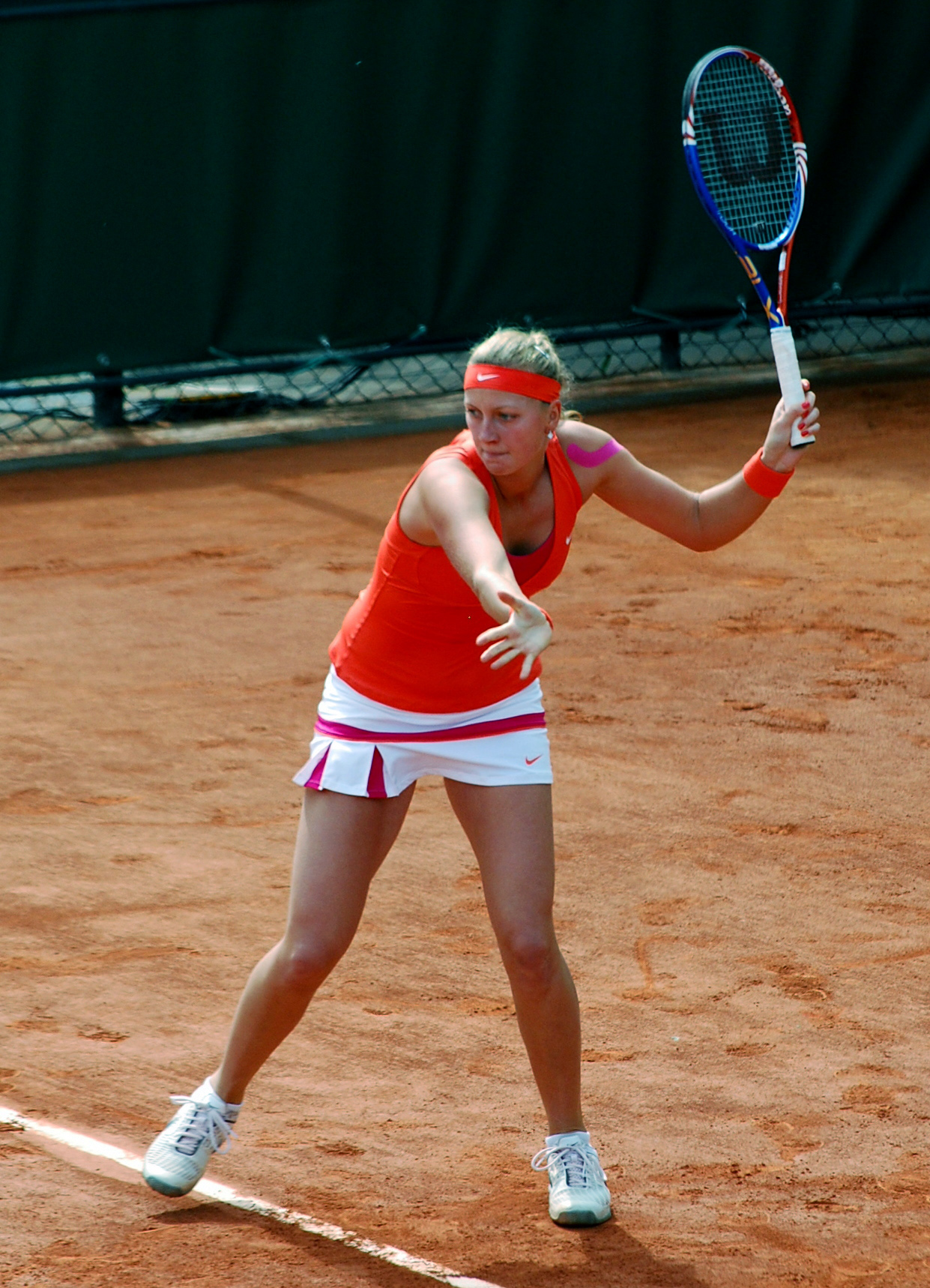
Petra Kvitová became the first Slam champion born in the '90s

Petra Kvitová won five titles prior to the Championships, capturing her sixth at this tournament. She began the year by winning the Brisbane International, defeating Andrea Petkovic 6–1, 6–3. She then reached the quarter-finals at the Australian Open, upsetting 5th seed Samantha Stosur 7–6^{(7–5)}, 6–3 in the third round before losing to Vera Zvonareva 2–6, 4–6. She then won the Open GDF Suez, defeating Kim Clijsters 6–4, 6–3. She then lost 4 of her next 5 matches before winning the Mutua Madrid Open, defeating Victoria Azarenka 7–6^{(7–3)}, 6–4 in the final. Later, she fell in the fourth round of the French Open to eventual champion Li Na 2–6, 6–1, 6–3. She then reached the final of the Aegon International, losing to Marion Bartoli 1–6, 6–4, 5–7. Her most significant title came by winning Wimbledon, beating Maria Sharapova 6–3, 6–4 in the final. After the triumph, she lost back-to-back third round matches to Andrea Petkovic in the US Open Series before becoming the first Wimbledon champion ever to fall in the first round of the US Open, where she lost to Alexandra Dulgheru 7–6^{(7–3)}, 6–3. She then won her fifth title of the year at the Generali Ladies Linz, defeating Slovakian Dominika Cibulková 6–4, 6–1. This is her debut at the championships.

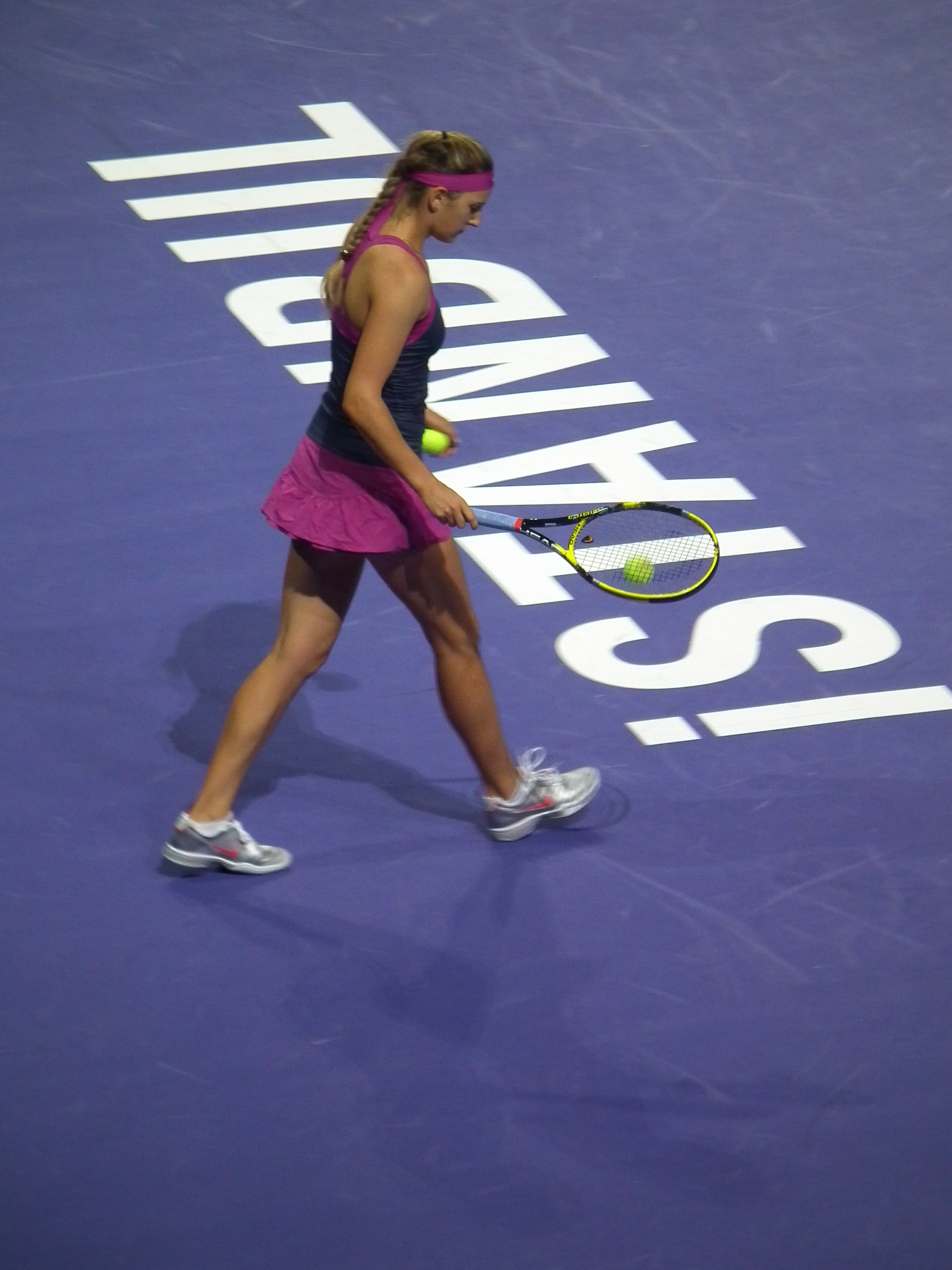
Victoria Azarenka reached a new career-high of world no. 3

Victoria Azarenka won three titles this year. She picked up her second Sony Ericsson Open trophy after defeating Maria Sharapova in the final 6–1, 6–4 and upsetting 2nd seed Kim Clijsters and 3rd seed Vera Zvonareva earlier. She then won her first clay title the following week at the Andalucia Tennis Experience, defeating Irina-Camelia Begu in the final 6–3, 6–2. She then claimed a title before the championships at the BGL Luxembourg Open defeating Monica Niculescu 6–2, 6–2. She reached another final at the Mutua Madrid Open, losing to Petra Kvitová in the final 7–6^{(7–3)}, 6–4. Azarenka reached her first Slam semifinal at Wimbledon losing to eventual champion Petra Kvitová 6–1, 3–6, 6–2. At the other Slams, she lost in the fourth round of the Australian Open and the quarterfinal of the French Open both to Li Na, and the third round of the 2011 US Open to Serena Williams 6–1, 7–6^{(7–5)}. Azarenka is making her third consecutive appearance at the event.

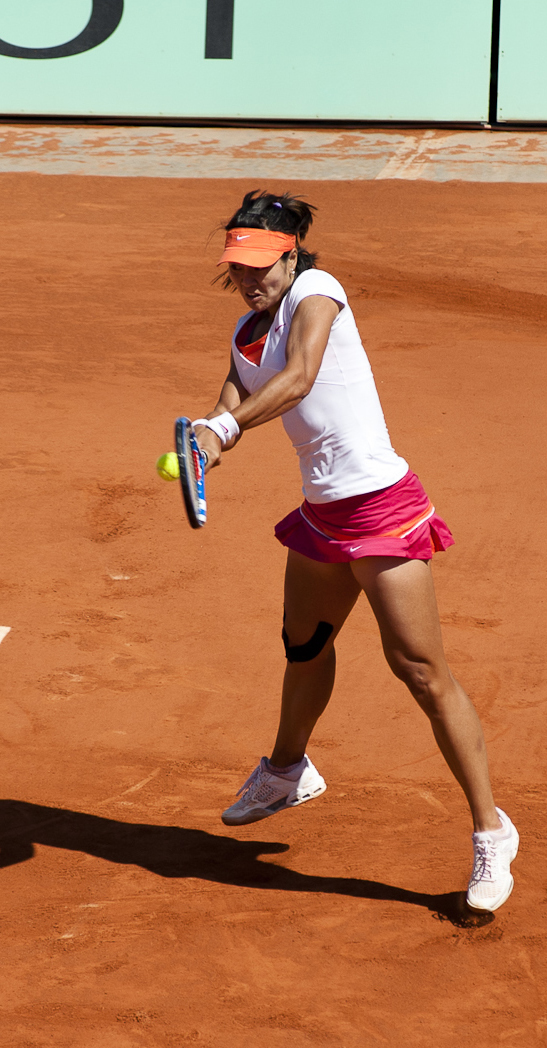
Li Na became the first Asian player to win a Grand Slam singles title

On October 5, Li Na became the fifth player to qualify for the championships.

Li Na has had a memorable yet very inconsistent year. She started the year by winning Sydney defeating Kim Clijsters in the final 7–6^{(3)}, 6–3 and reaching the final of the Australian Open, upsetting world no. 1 Caroline Wozniacki in the semi-finals, but losing to Kim Clijsters 6–3, 3–6, 3–6. However, she lost her next 4 matches before bouncing back in the European clay season, reaching the semifinals of the Mutua Madrid Open and Internazionali BNL d'Italia. Li then won her first Grand Slam title and became the first Grand Slam singles champion born in an Asian country at the French Open, defeating defending champion Francesca Schiavone 6–4, 7–6^{(7–0)} in the final. Following her French Open victory, she has had disappointing results for the rest of the year with the 5–7 record, including the second round lost at Wimbledon to Sabine Lisicki 6–3, 4–6, 6–8 and the first round defeat from Simona Halep 6–2, 7–5 at the US Open. Li is making her debut at the tournament after being an alternate last year.

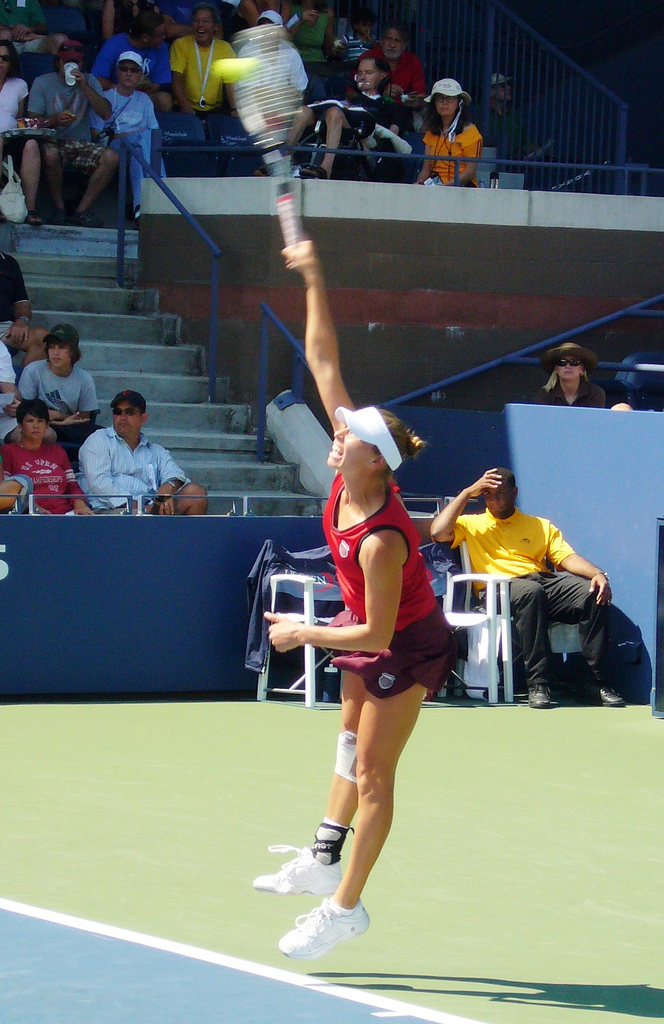
Vera Zvonareva reached the semifinals of Australian Open

On October 9, Vera Zvonareva and Samantha Stosur qualified for the championships.

Vera Zvonareva was not able to duplicate her 2010 season in 2011, however, she won two titles this year to one in the previous year. She won her first title in over a year at the Qatar Ladies Open, defeating world no. 1 Caroline Wozniacki 6–4, 6–4 in the final. She then won her second title at the Baku Cup, beating her compatriot Ksenia Pervak in the final 6–1, 6–4. She reached two other finals in the Mercury Insurance Open and the 2011 Toray Pan Pacific Open, both losing to Agnieszka Radwańska with a scoreline of 6–3, 6–4 and 6–3, 6–2, respectively. At the Slams, her best result was reaching the semi-finals of the Australian Open, losing to Kim Clijsters 6–3, 6–3. She also lost in the quarterfinals of the US Open to Samantha Stosur 6–3, 6–3, the fourth round of the French Open to Anastasia Pavlyuchenkova 7–6^{(7–4)}, 2–6, 6–2, and the third round of the Wimbledon to Tsvetana Pironkova 6–2, 6–3. Zvonareva is making her fifth appearance at the Championships. Her best result was reaching the final in 2008.

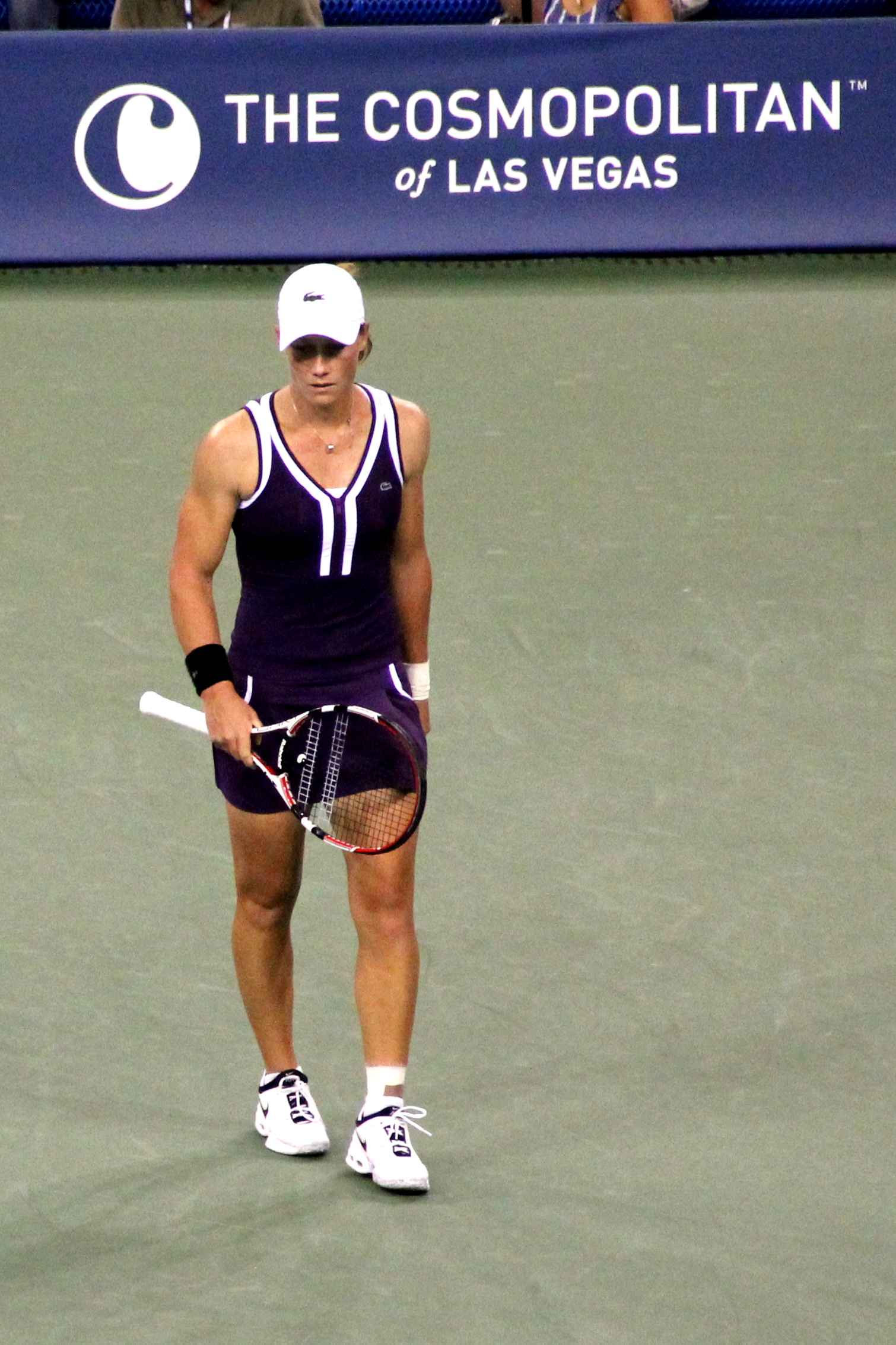
Samantha Stosur wins her first slam

Samantha Stosur did not enjoy a successful first half of the year, failing to reach a semifinal of any event until the Porsche Tennis Grand Prix in April. She then reached her first final of the year at the Internazionali BNL d'Italia, losing to Maria Sharapova 6–2, 6–4, despite having not lost a set before the final. She reached her second final at the Rogers Cup before falling to Serena Williams 6–4, 6–2 in the final. In September, she became the winner of the US Open after beating the heavy favorite Serena Williams in the final in straight sets 6–2, 6–3, to win her maiden Slam title. She also became the first Australian woman to win a Slam since Evonne Goolagong Cawley won Wimbledon in 1980. She then reached the final of the HP Open losing to Marion Bartoli 6–3, 6–1. In the other Slams, she fell in the third rounds of the Australian Open to Petra Kvitová 7–6^{(7–5)}, 6–3 and French Open to Gisela Dulko 6–4, 1–6, 6–3, and the first round of the Wimbledon to 262nd ranked Melinda Czink 6–3, 6–4. Stosur is making her second appearance at the event, after the semifinals' appearance in 2010.

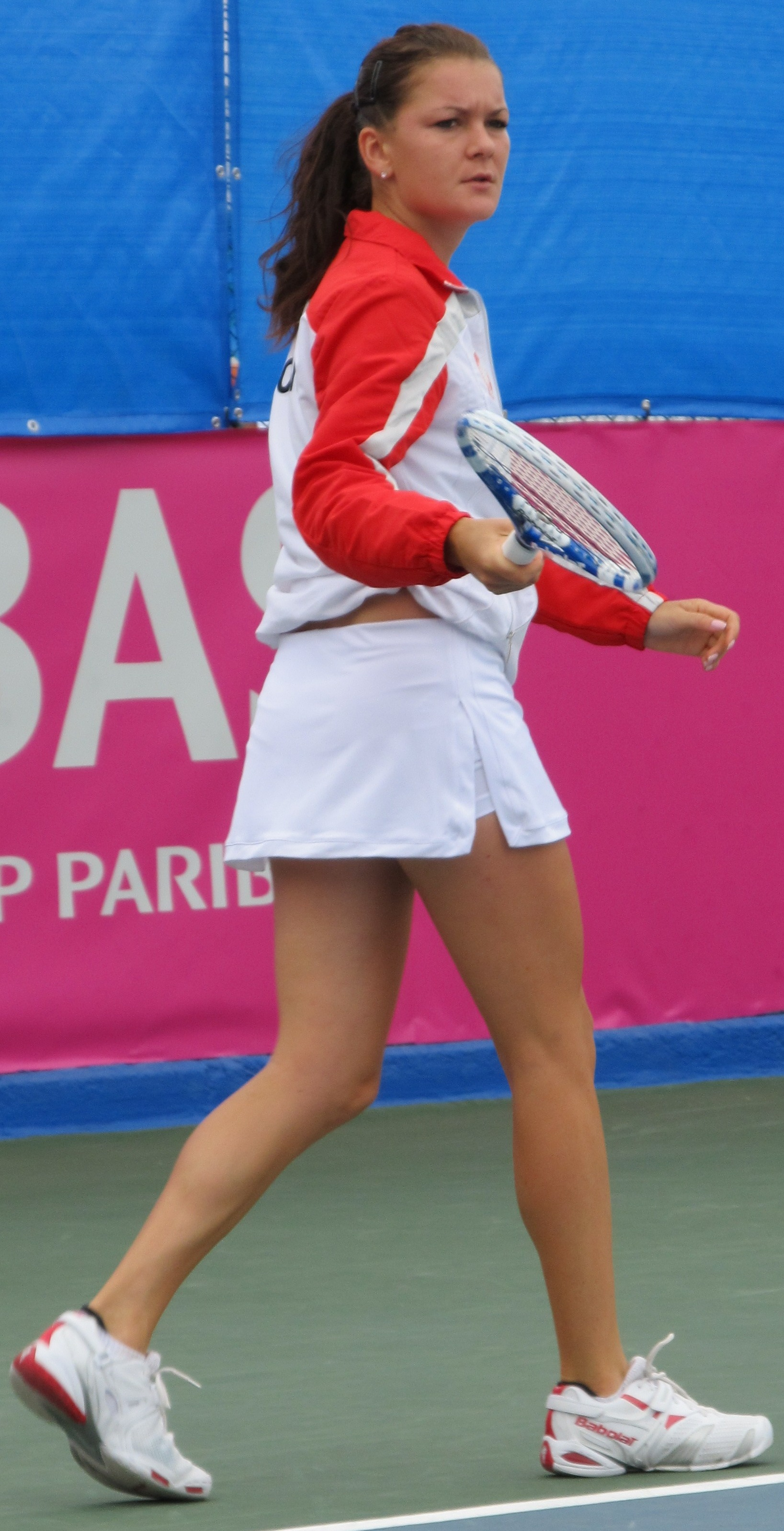
Agnieszka Radwańska qualified for the first time

On October 21, Agnieszka Radwańska became the last to qualify after Marion Bartoli withdrew in her quarterfinal match in Kremlin Cup

Agnieszka Radwańska reached three finals in 2011 and won all of them, thus ending her 3 year-title drought. Her first title of the year came in the Mercury Insurance Open, where she defeated top seed Vera Zvonareva 6–3, 6–4 in the final. In the Asian swing season, she won back-to-back titles in the Toray Pan Pacific Open over Vera Zvonareva 6–3, 6–2 and the China Open over Andrea Petkovic 7–5, 0–6, 6–4, winning her biggest title so far. At the slams, Radwańska was able to reach her fourth slam quarterfinal at the Australian Open losing to eventual champion Kim Clijsters 6–3, 7–6^{(7–4)}. However, she fell short in the fourth round of the French Open to Maria Sharapova 7–6^{(7–4)}, 7–5, the second rounds of both the Wimbledon to Petra Cetkovská 3–6, 7–6^{(7–5)}, 6–4, and the US Open to Angelique Kerber 6–3, 4–6, 6–3. She is making her third appearance, having played as the alternate here in 2008 and 2009.

The first alternate for the championships is Frenchwomen Marion Bartoli, who has reached 5 finals in the year. She reached her first Premier Mandatory final at the BNP Paribas Open losing to Caroline Wozniacki 6–1, 2–6, 6–3, then lost her next final at the Internationaux de Strasbourg to Andrea Petkovic retiring being down 6–4, 1–0. She then won her first title since 2009 at the Aegon International defeating Petra Kvitová 6–1, 4–6, 7–5. At Wimbledon, she lost to Sabine Lisicki 6–4, 6–7^{(4–7)}, 6–1 in the quarterfinal after upsetting Serena Williams in the previous round. On the contrary, she fell to Serena Williams in the final of the Bank of the West Classic. She then won her second title of the year at the 2011 HP Open defeating Samantha Stosur 6–3, 6–1 in the final. At the 2011 French Open, she reached her second career slam semifinal. The second alternate is Andrea Petkovic, who is enjoying her best season so far by cracking the top 10. She won her lone title of the year at the Internationaux de Strasbourg over Marion Bartoli. She then reached two other final, at the Brisbane International losing to Petra Kvitová 6–1, 6–3 and the final of the China Open losing to Agnieszka Radwańska 7–5, 0–6, 6–4 in her first Premier Mandatory final. At the slams she was able to reach the quarterfinals in 3 of the 4 majors excluding Wimbledon.

=== Doubles ===
Race doubles (as of October 17, 2011)
Current Rank	Players	Points to Qualify	Points	Tourn	Date Qualified
1	Květa Peschke (CZE); Katarina Srebotnik (SLO)	8,291	9,291	19	5 September
2	Liezel Huber (USA); Lisa Raymond (USA)	6,423	6,773	15	1 October
3	Gisela Dulko (ARG); Flavia Pennetta (ITA)	5,706	5,776	13	11 October
4	Vania King (USA); Yaroslava Shvedova (KAZ)	5,730	5,730	11	16 October

On September 5, Květa Peschke and Katarina Srebotnik became the first doubles team to qualify for the year-end championships.

Květa Peschke and Katarina Srebotnik continued their partnership coming to 2011, they also were able to reach the no. 1 ranking in doubles for the first time on July 4, 2011. They were also able to win 6 titles together their first coming in the ASB Classic over the team of Arvidsson & Erakovic 6–3, 6–0. They then won their second title in the Qatar Ladies Open over Huber & Petrova 7–5, 6–7^{(2–7)}, [10–8]. Their next titles came in back-to-back-to-back winning in Aegon International over Huber & Raymond 6–3, 6–0, in Wimbledon over Lisicki & Stosur 6–3, 6–1 and in the Mercury Insurance Open over Kopz-Jones & Spears 6–0, 6–2. Their triumph in Wimbledon is the team's first Slam title together and their first as individuals in the women's doubles. They then claimed their sixth title at the China Open over Dulko & Pennetta 6–3, 6–4. They also reached three other finals in the Medibank International Sydney losing to Benešová & Záhlavová-Strýcová, in Dubai Tennis Championships falling to Huber & Martínez Sánchez and in the Mutua Madrid Open to Azarenka & Kirilenko. Srebotnik also on the mixed doubles title in the Australian Open with Daniel Nestor. In the other Slams they were able to reach the semifinals of the Australian Open and the quarterfinals of the French Open and US Open.

On October 1, Liezel Huber and Lisa Raymond became the second team to qualify for the championships.

Liezel Huber and Lisa Raymond did not start pairing up for doubles until the European clay season as Huber initially paired with Nadia Petrova and Raymond teamed up with Julia Görges. The veteran team then had a great result together, reaching the semifinals of the French Open and the quarterfinals of Wimbledon. They lost their first two finals in the Aegon International losing to Peschke & Srebotnik 6–3, 6–0 and in the Bank of the West Classic losing to Azarenka & Kirilenko 6–1, 6–3. Their first title as a team came in as a gift winning the Rogers Cup over Azarenka & Kirilenko in a walkover. They then claim their first Slam as a team in the US Open over King & Shvedova 4–6, 7–6^{(7–5)}, 7–6^{(7–3)}. They then collected their third title at the Toray Pan Pacific Open over Dulko & Pennetta 7–6^{(7–4)}, 0–6, [10–6]. Huber was also able reach two other finals in the Dubai Tennis Championships with María José Martínez Sánchez winning over Peschke & Srebotnik 7–6^{(7–5)}, 6–3 and in the Qatar Ladies Open with Nadia Petrova in a losing effort to Peschke & Srebotnik.

On October 11, Gisela Dulko and Flavia Pennetta became the third team to qualify for the championships.

Gisela Dulko and Flavia Penetta failed to duplicate their 2010 season winning 6 titles and the championship as they only won one title in the year, but it is their most prestigious title as a team this coming in the Australian Open beating Azarenka & Kirilenko 2–6, 7–5, 6–1. This marks their first Slam title as team and as individuals. An injury suffered by Dulko prevented the team to collect some points during the mid-season. However, the team performed well during the Asian swing and became the runner-up in both Toray Pan Pacific Open to Huber & Raymond and China Open to Peschke & Srebotnik. In the other Slams they reached the quarterfinals of the French Open and the third round of the US Open. Pennetta also reached another final with Dominika Cibulková at the UNICEF Open losing to Záhlavová-Strýcová & Zakopalová.

On October 16, Vania King and Yaroslava Shvedova took the last spot over Victoria Azarenka and Maria Kirilenko.

Vania King and Yaroslava Shvedova wasn't able to play together until the BNP Paribas Open due to Shvedova's knee injury. The team weren't able to match up to their 2010 season when they won 2 Slam titles, as they only reached 1 slam final in the US Open losing to Huber & Raymond 6–4, 6–7^{(5–7)}, 6–7^{(3–7)}. They won their first title of the year at the Western & Southern Open winning 6–4, 3–6, [11–9] over Grandin & Uhlířová. They also reached two other finals in a losing effort in the Internazionali BNL d'Italia losing to the Chinese pair of Peng & Zheng 2–6, 3–6 and in the HP Open losing to the Asian pair of Date-Krumm & Zhang in the final 5–7, 6–3, [9–11]. Shvedova was able to win another title with Sania Mirza this time at the Citi Open over Govortsova & Kudryavtseva 6–3, 6–3. King also reached a final with a different partner Anna-Lena Grönefeld at the Monterrey Open losing to Czechs Benešová & Záhlavová-Strýcová.

== Groupings ==
The 2011 edition of the year-end championships featured two former World number ones, four Grand Slam champions, two Grand Slam finalists. Two of them made their debut at the championships. The competitors were divided into two groups representing the colors of the flag of Turkey. The Red group consisted of no. 1 seed Caroline Wozniacki, no. 3 seed Petra Kvitová, no. 6 seed Vera Zvonareva and no. 8 seed Agnieszka Radwańska. The White Group was composed of no. 2 seed Maria Sharapova, no, 4 seed Victoria Azarenka, no. 5 seed Li Na and no. 7 seed Samantha Stosur. Marion Bartoli and Andrea Petkovic served as alternates.

In the red group, in their respective records in their group, World no. 1 Caroline Wozniacki was 11–6, Petra Kvitová was 5–6, Vera Zvonareva was 9–9 and Agnieszka Radwańska was 4–8. Leading the group Wozniacki, has a good record in each opponent in her group. She has a positive record against Kvitová, leading the Wimbledon champion 3–1, with their last meeting coming in the third round of the 2010 China Open, with Wozniacki winning 6–3, 6–2 and all their matches were won in straight sets. Against Zvonareva, she has a record of 4–4, with Zvonareva winning their only encounter in 2011 in the final of the Qatar Ladies Open 6–4, 6–4. Against good friend Radwańska, the Dane lead 4–1 winning their last four matches including their only encounter in 2011 at the semifinal of the Porsche Tennis Grand Prix 7–5, 6–3, with Radwańska's last win coming in 2007. Zvonareva on the other hand, has close records against Kvitová and Radwańska. Against Kvitová, the Russian leads 3–2 facing each other 3 times in 2011 all won in straight sets, with Zvonerva winning two of them in the quarterfinals of the Australian Open and the semifinal of the Toray Pan Pacific Open and lost in the third round of the Mutua Madrid Open. In her match-up against Radwańska, the Russian trails 2–3 with them competing against each other 4 times in 2011 all won in straight sets and the Pole winning their last three encounters – the first in the final of Mercury Insurance Open, the third round of Rogers Cup, and the final of the Toray Pan Pacific Open, Zvonerva's last win came in quarterfinal of the Sony Ericsson Open. In the head-to-head of first time qualifiers. Kvitová and Radwańska, The Czech has won both of their matches including their last match in the quarterfinal of Aegon International 1–6, 6–2, 7–6^{(7–2)}

In the white group, in their head-to-heads with players within their group, Maria Sharapova was 17–6, Victoria Azarenka was 8–7, Li Na was 7–11, and Samantha Stosur was 5–13. Like Wozniacki, Sharapova has a good record against each members of her group. Against Azarenka, they have split their match-ups with each having 3 wins, and also splitting their match-ups in 2011 with 1 win each, with Azarenka winning in the final of the Sony Ericsson Open and Sharapova winning in the quarterfinal of the Internazionali BNL d'Italia. Against Li, Sharapova leads their head-to-head 5–3, however Li has won their 3 previous meetings in straight sets including the semifinal of the French Open 6–4, 7–5. Against Stosur, Sharapova has a perfect record of 9–0 including 3 straight set wins in the fourth round of the Sony Ericsson Open, the final of the Internazionali BNL d'Italia, and the quarterfinal of the Western & Southern Open. Azarenka, in the other hand has a mixed record against Li and Stosur. She trails Li 1–4, including losing in the fourth round of the Australian Open 6–3, 6–3 and the quarterfinal of the French Open 7–5, 6–2. However, against Stosur, Azarenka has never lost a match and a set winning their four encounters, with their last meeting coming in semifinal of the 2010 Bank of the West Classic with the Belarusian winning 6–2, 6–3. In the match-up between Slam champions Li and Stosur, despite Stosur having lost all matches against Sharapova and Azarenka, she has never lost to Li winning their 5 matches including 3 in 2011 in the semifinal of the Internazionali BNL d'Italia, the third rounds of Rogers Cup and Western & Southern Open.

The four doubles teams started the semifinals without group play.

== Player head-to-head ==
Below are the head-to-head records as they approached the tournament.

		Wozniacki	Sharapova	Kvitová	Azarenka	Li	Zvonareva	Stosur	Radwańska	Overall	YTD
1	(Denmark) Caroline Wozniacki		2–3	3–1	4–2	1–3	4–4	2–3	4–1	20–17	62–15
2	(Russia) Maria Sharapova	3–2		1–2	3–3	5–3	7–3	9–0	7–1	35–14	43–12
3	(Czech Republic) Petra Kvitová	1–3	2–1		3–2	1–1	2–3	2–0	2–0	13–10	53–13
4	(Belarus) Victoria Azarenka	2–4	3–3	2–3		1–4	3–6	4–0	5–3	20–23	52–15
5	(China) Li Na	3–1	3–5	1–1	4–1		3–4	0–5	2–2	16–19	31–15
6	(Russia) Vera Zvonareva	4–4	3–7	3–2	6–3	4–3		2–8	2–3	24–30	55–19
7	(Australia) Samantha Stosur	3–2	0–9	0–2	0–4	5–0	8–2		2–1	18–20	43–21
8	(Poland) Agnieszka Radwańska	1–4	1–7	0–2	3–5	2–2	3–2	1–2		11–24	45–16

== Day-by-day summaries ==
=== Day 1 ===
The action in this year's Tour Championships began with the Red Group with Wimbledon champion Petra Kvitová and 2008 finalist Vera Zvonareva. Having lost to Zvonareva in straight sets just a few weeks ago in Tokyo, Kvitová had her work cut out for her, but this time it was different - Kvitová hadn't lost an indoor match all year and her huge serve, powerful groundstrokes and strong net play were working like a charm as she raced out to a 6–2, 4–1 lead. Things got tougher as the unforced errors began to creep into Kvitová's game, and Zvonareva closed the gap to 4–all in the second set; but the No.3-seeded Kvitová broke again for 5–4 and served it out, getting two errors in a row from the No.6-seeded Zvonareva to get to match point then knifing a forehand volley. The series between the two is now knotted at 3–3. Kvitová ended with an even differential, 24 winners to 24 errors; she won 17 of 23 net points (including match point). Zvonareva was −9 (eight winners, 17 errors).

They were followed by last years finalist Caroline Wozniacki and first time qualifier Agnieszka Radwańska. Wozniacki had her chances in the first set, rallying from 2–4 to 5–4 and holding triple set point with Radwańska falling into a 0–40 hole in the next game; Radwańska snuck that game out and took the first set, Radwańska then started to be bothered by her shoulder injury and started to go for her shots but Wozniacki wouldn't lose her cool, comfortably taking the second set and holding steady from 4–all in the third to close the door on the two-hour, 39-minute marathon.

The last match saw two US champions the 2006 champion Maria Sharapova and the current champion Samantha Stosur. Stosur, the No.7 seed at the year-end finale, turned the tables on one of the most lopsided head-to-heads in the upper echelon of the women's game, coming out like a house on fire then surviving some tense moments to close out a No.2-ranked, No.2-seeded Sharapova in straight sets 6–1, 7–5. Having lost her last 11 sets in a row to Sharapova, Stosur stormed through the opening set in just 28 minutes, then rallied from 3–0 down in the second set, with Sharapova missing a backhand return on match point. Both players had a similar number of winners throughout the match – Stosur 18, Sharapova 17 – but Sharapova's 30 unforced errors far outweighed Stosur's 17 miscues.

Matches
Group	Winner	Loser	Score
Red Group	(Czech Republic) Petra Kvitová [3]	(Russia) Vera Zvonareva [6]	6–2, 6–4
Red Group	(Denmark) Caroline Wozniacki [1]	(Poland) Agnieszka Radwańska [8]	5–7, 6–2, 6–4
White Group	(Australia) Samantha Stosur [7]	(Russia) Maria Sharapova [2]	6–1, 7–5

=== Day 2 ===
The second day began with Belarus' Victoria Azarenka and Australia's Samantha Stosur, Azarenka lead their head-to-head 4–0. With her intense and relentless barrage of deep, penetrating groundstrokes, the No.4-seeded Azarenka never really let the No.7-seeded Stosur into the match, losing just five points in seven service games and breaking four times in building a 6–2, 5–2 lead. Stosur put up a fight in a 10-minute final game, saving three match points - including two on big inside out forehand winners - but Azarenka wrapped up the one-hour, 17-minute triumph on her fourth match point. In their winners to unforced errors ratio, Stosur was 11–26, Azarenka was 16–13.

The second match saw French Open Champion Li Na making her debut against no. 2 seed Maria Sharapova. Having not won a match since August - she lost first round at her last two events at the US Open and Beijing, and in straight sets too - Li's game came alive at the TEB BNP Paribas WTA Championships, as her power game clicked against one of the most powerful players in the game. She rallied from 2–4 to take the first set to a tie-break, where she rallied from 0–4 to take the set; she then held off a late surge from Sharapova in the second set, watching a 5–2 lead close to 5–4 before finally serving out the victory in front of a packed crowd. Li had been struggling since becoming Asia's first Grand Slam champion at the French Open, going 5–7 in her seven tournaments since – but she had won her last three meetings against Sharapova in straight sets and brought that magic out again, getting just a few more winners in the winners column - 15 to 12. Li is the first Chinese ever to compete in singles at the year-end finale. Later in the day, Sharapova withdrew with a left ankle injury, ending her chance to finish the year at No.1.

The last match of the day came between two former US Open finalists Vera Zvonareva and Caroline Wozniacki, who has split their former 8 matches in half. Zvonareva, the No.6 seed, was the clear aggressor in the match, winning the first set in just 35 minutes. Wozniacki broke in the last game of the second set to push the match to a third but Zvonareva resumed her aggressive style, racing out to a double-break 4–1 lead. The Russian, who just turned 27 last month, won the last seven points of the match to end it 6–2, 4–6, 6–3.

Matches
Group	Winner	Loser	Score
White Group	(Belarus) Victoria Azarenka [4]	(Australia) Samantha Stosur [7]	6–2, 6–2
White Group	(China) Li Na [5]	(Russia) Maria Sharapova [2]	7–6^{(7–4)}, 6–4
Red Group	(Russia) Vera Zvonareva [6]	(Denmark) Caroline Wozniacki [1]	6–2, 4–6, 6–3

=== Day 3 ===
The first match featured white group's Victoria Azarenka and Li Na. Victoria Azarenka was a relentless wall of power at the TEB BNP Paribas WTA Championships on Thursday, getting revenge for losses at the Australian and French Opens with a commanding 6–2, 6–2 win over Li Na. Azarenka, who lost to Li in straight sets in the fourth round in Melbourne and in the quarterfinals in Paris - and had actually lost four of the pair's five previous meetings - was sharper in every department against Li this time, controlling most of the rallies with her powerful groundstrokes and sending any of the Chinese trailblazer's own powerful groundstrokes back with added interest. Although Li hit twice as many winners as Azarenka (18 to 9) those were far outweighed by more than twice as many unforced errors (39 to 17). Having beaten Samantha Stosur by an identical scoreline on Wednesday, Azarenka is now 2–0 in the White Group and the first to qualify for the semifinals.

The second match saw top seed Caroline Wozniacki taking on third seed Petra Kvitová. With a swift 6–4, 6–2 win over Caroline Wozniacki, Petra Kvitová not only scored her second win over a reigning No.1, she also got the second spot in the TEB BNP Paribas WTA Championships semifinals. Kvitová, the No.3 seed, beat the No.1-seeded Wozniacki in style, losing just 17 points in nine service games and breaking Wozniacki three times, including in the first game of each set. The No.3-ranked Czech - just the fourth Czech player ever to rank in the Top 3, after Martina Navratilova, Hana Mandlíková and Jana Novotná - served seven aces in the one-hour, 24-minute victory.

The last match was one of the most enthralling one in tournament so far with Russian Vera Zvonareva taking on Pole Agnieszka Radwańska. Zvonareva wouldn't have just qualified for the semifinals with a victory over Radwańska, she would have snapped a three-match losing streak against her, having lost to her at Carlsbad, Toronto and Tokyo in the last few months - all in straight sets, too. This one would be much different. It took just 35 minutes for the No.6-seeded Zvonareva to win the first set, 6–1; Radwańska, the No.8 seed, retaliated with a 6–2 second set. An aggressive Zvonareva regrouped and got to double match point at 5–3, 40–15 in the third set but missed down-the-lines on both of those, then lost an extended exchange on her third match point in the same game. She would eventually lose to Radwańska for a fourth straight time, 1–6, 6–2 7–5.

Matches
Group	Winner	Loser	Score
White Group	(Belarus) Victoria Azarenka [4]	(China) Li Na [5]	6–2, 6–2
Red Group	(Czech Republic) Petra Kvitová [3]	(Denmark) Caroline Wozniacki [1]	6–4, 6–2
Red Group	(Poland) Agnieszka Radwańska [8]	(Russia) Vera Zvonareva [6]	1–6, 6–2, 7–5

=== Day 4 ===
The first match saw two Slam champions between Li Na and Samantha Stosur, with the winner advancing to the semifinals. Samantha Stosur served up a barrage of kick serves and blasted some ferocious forehands to completely confound Li Na in 66 minutes, 6–1, 6–0, improving to 6–0 in the pair's head-to-head series and dealing the Chinese her most lopsided loss on the WTA in almost three and a half years. Their sixth meeting at the TEB BNP Paribas WTA Championships on Friday was by far their quickest, as Stosur hit far more winners (15 to 4) and was cleaner on the unforced errors (22 to 32) and basically dominated every department, losing her serve from 30-0 up in the fifth game of the match but otherwise winning every game en route to her easiest victory since Dubai in February.

The second match saw Agnieszka Radwańska trying to advance to the semifinals taking on Petra Kvitová. With Kvitová, Victoria Azarenka and Samantha Stosur already through, Radwańska had to take a set from Kvitová on Friday to become the fourth player into the final four. And that goal didn't seem far away at all as she stormed out to a 5–1 first set lead - but Kvitová suddenly came alive, her power game hitting its mark as she stormed back to take the opening set comfortably in a tie-break. Although there were a few close moments midway through the second set - she went to six deuces before holding in a marathon game for 4–3 - Kvitová never really looked in trouble again, eventually finishing the match off with a big crosscourt forehand that drew one last backhand error from Radwańska. Whether she was winning or losing, Kvitová seemed to be in complete control of the score against Radwańska - she finished the match with 42 winners to 47 unforced errors, while Radwańska had eight winners to 17 unforced errors. Kvitová finished first in the Red Group with a bullet, 3–0 in win–loss and 6–0 in sets. Although Zvonareva, Radwańska and Caroline Wozniacki all ended with a 1–2 win–loss record and 3–5 sets won-lost, Zvonareva had the best games won-lost percentage of the three and thus finished second in the Red Group. The semifinals will be Red Group No.1 Kvitová taking on White Group No.2 Stosur, and White Group No.1 Azarenka taking on Red Group No.2 Zvonareva.

In the last round robin match of the week on Friday night, Victoria Azarenka took on alternate Marion Bartoli. The result, a 5–7, 6–4, 6–4 win for Bartoli, had no effect on either group's standings. However, Azarenka was accused of tanking the final set of the match, going for winners at the get go and not willing to track down balls.

Matches
Group	Winner	Loser	Score
White Group	(Australia) Samantha Stosur [7]	(China) Li Na [5]	6–1, 6–0
Red Group	(Czech Republic) Petra Kvitová [3]	(Poland) Agnieszka Radwańska [8]	7–6^{(7–4)}, 6–3
White Group	(France) Marion Bartoli [9]	(Belarus) Victoria Azarenka [4]	5–7, 6–4, 6–4

=== Day 5 ===
The first singles semifinal match saw white group no. 1 Petra Kvitová and red group no. 2 Samantha Stosur. Kvitová was the only player to make it through the round robin undefeated, but she showed some cracks in her last match on Friday, falling behind 5–1 in the first set before rallying to beat Agnieszka Radwańska in straights. And although she was up an early break she had somewhat of a slowish start again against a confident Stosur, who came back to take the first set and eventually build a 7–5, 1–0 lead, with a break point to go up 7–5, 2–0. Just like she did before, though, Kvitová came alive when she needed to, winning six of the next eight games to take the second set 6–3, then racing ahead 5–0 in the third. Stosur made things exciting at the end by winning three straight games to close to 5–3, but the Wimbledon champion held on, closing out the US Open champion with a love hold 5–7, 6–3, 6–3. Both Kvitová and Stosur finished with clean winners-to-errors differentials (Kvitová 38–39, Stosur 16–18) but the biggest difference came in creating break point opportunities – Kvitová brought up 11 break points (converting on five) while Stosur only got six break points (converting on three).

The second semifinal featured red group no. 1 Victoria Azarenka and white group no. 2 Vera Zvonareva. She broke serve three times in the first set, including once at love. There were some tough moments in the 59-minute second set, including a marathon six-deuce fourth game where Zvonareva defied four break points to hold for 2–all, but Azarenka got a late break and save two break points at the final game and served it out, It is her fourth win in their 10 meetings. Azarenka of Belarus eventually won 6–2, 6–3 Saturday to reach the final of the WTA Championships. The No. 4-ranked Azarenka's solid groundstrokes forced errors from No. 6 Zvonareva, who was never able to gain momentum in the match.

In the doubles, Peschke and Srebotnik, the No.1 seeds, were the first team into the final, getting the only break of serve in the first set then rebounding after a second set lapse to beat Vania King and Yaroslava Shvedova 6–3, 6–4. Peschke and Srebotnik broke King's serve en route to taking the opening set and built a 3–0 lead in the second, only to lose four straight games; but the momentum swung again and they won three more games of their own to close it out. Huber and Raymond, the No.2 seeds, followed with a 4–6, 6–3, [10–7] victory over Gisela Dulko and Flavia Pennetta, the defending champs at the year-ender. Huber and Raymond not only rallied from a set down to win, they also came back from 3–6 in the match tie-break, Huber hitting winners on four of the last five points of the match (two drop volley winners and two big overheads).

Matches
Group	Winner	Loser	Score
Doubles – Semifinals	(Czech Republic) Květa Peschke [1] (Slovenia) Katarina Srebotnik [1]	(United States) Vania King [4] (Kazakhstan) Yaroslava Shvedova [4]	6–3, 6–4
Singles – Semifinals	(Czech Republic) Petra Kvitová [3]	(Australia) Samantha Stosur [7]	5–7, 6–3, 6–3
Singles – Semifinals	(Belarus) Victoria Azarenka [4]	(Russia) Vera Zvonareva [6]	6–2, 6–3
Doubles – Semifinals	(United States) Liezel Huber [2] (United States) Lisa Raymond [2]	(Argentina) Gisela Dulko [3] (Italy) Flavia Pennetta [3]	4–6, 6–3, [10–7]

=== Day 6 ===
The first match was the Doubles Final between the top two seeds Květa Peschke & Katarina Srebotnik and Liezel Huber & Lisa Raymond. Liezel Huber and Lisa Raymond wrapped up a breakthrough year at the TEB BNP Paribas WTA Championships, capturing their fourth title in their last six events with a 64 64 win on Sunday over Květa Peschke and Katarina Srebotnik, losing three straight games from 64 31 but regrouping and winning three straight games of their own to finish it. They fell short on their first two match points but Huber closed it out with a backhand volley at Srebotnik's body.

They were followed on court by the Singles Final between 3rd seed Petra Kvitová and 4th seed Victoria Azarenka, who were battling not only for the championship but for the world no. 2 ranking. Kvitová won 7–5 4–6 6–3, hitting a forehand pass that drew an error on the final point.

Matches
Group	Winner	Loser	Score
Final	(United States) Liezel Huber [2] (United States) Lisa Raymond [2]	(Czech Republic) Květa Peschke [1] (Slovenia) Katarina Srebotnik [1]	6–4, 6–4
Final	(Czech Republic) Petra Kvitová [3]	(Belarus) Victoria Azarenka [4]	7–5, 4–6, 6–3

== Race to the championships ==
=== Singles ===
Those with a gold background have enough points to qualify; with a brown background withdrew.

Rank	Athlete	Grand Slam tournament				Premier Mandatory				Best Premier 5		Best other						Total points	Tourn
Rank	Athlete	AUS	FRA	WIM	USO	IW	MIA	MAD	BEI	1	2	1	2	3	4	5	6	Total points	Tourn
1	(Denmark) Caroline Wozniacki	SF; 900	R32; 160	R16; 280	SF; 900	W 1000	R16; 140	R16; 140	QF; 250	W 900	SF; 395	W 470	W 470	W 470	F 320	F 320	W 280	7,395	21
2	(Russia) Maria Sharapova	R16; 280	SF; 900	F 1400	R32; 160	SF; 450	F 700	R16; 140	A	W 900	W 900	QF; 225	R16; 125	QF; 120	QF; 70			6,370	14
3	(Czech Republic) Petra Kvitová	QF; 500	R16; 280	W 2000	R128; 5	R64; 5	R32; 80	W 1000	R32; 5	SF; 395	R16; 125	W 470	F 320	W 280	W 280	R16; 125	F 100	5,970	18
4	(Belarus) Victoria Azarenka	R16; 280	QF; 500	SF; 900	R32; 160	QF; 250	W 1000	F 700	R16; 140	SF; 395	SF; 395	W 280	W 280	QF; 225	R16; 125	R16; 120	A 0	5,750	20
5	(China) Li Na	F 1,400	W 2,000	R64; 100	R128; 5	R64; 5	R64; 5	SF; 450	R32; 5	SF; 395	R16; 125	W 470	SF; 200	R16; 70	R16; 60	R16; 60	R32; 1	5,351	17
6	(Russia) Vera Zvonareva	SF; 900	R16; 280	R32; 160	QF; 500	R32; 80	SF; 450	R16; 140	R16; 140	F 620	SF; 395	W 470	W 280	SF; 130	SF; 200	F 320	R16; 125	5,190	21
7	(Australia) Samantha Stosur	R32; 160	R32; 160	R128; 5	W 2000	R32; 80	R16; 140	R16; 140	R32; 80	F 620	F 620	QF; 225	QF; 225	F 200	SF; 200	SF; 200	R16; 160	5,115	21
8	(Poland) Agnieszka Radwańska	QF; 500	R16; 280	R64; 100	R64; 100	R16; 140	QF; 250	R32; 80	W 1000	W 900	SF; 395	W 470	QF; 225	SF; 200	QF; 120	QF; 120	R16; 60	4,940	19
9	(France) Marion Bartoli	R64; 100	SF; 900	QF; 500	R64; 100	F 700	R16; 140	R32; 80	R16; 140	QF; 225	R16; 125	W 470	F 320	W 280	F 200	SF; 200	SF; 130	4,610	27
10	(Germany) Andrea Petkovic	QF; 500	QF; 500	R32; 160	QF; 500	R32; 80	SF; 450	R32; 80	F 700	SF; 395	QF; 225	W 280	F 200	SF; 200	QF; 120	QF; 120	R32; 70	4,580	18
