= 2010 Porsche Tennis Grand Prix – Doubles =

Doubles
- 2010 Porsche Tennis Grand Prix
- 2009 Champions: (Argentina) Gisela Dulko (Italy) Flavia Pennetta

Final
- Champions: (Germany) Sabine Lisicki (Slovenia) Katarina Srebotnik
- Runners-up: (Czech Republic) Květa Peschke (Germany) Jasmin Wöhr
- Score: 3–6, 7–6^{(7–3)}, [10–4]

Details
- Draw: 16
- Seeds: 4

Events
Singles	Doubles
- Porsche Tennis Grand Prix

Bethanie Mattek-Sands and Nadia Petrova were the defending champions; however, they chose not to compete this year.

== Seeds ==
1. (Argentina) Gisela Dulko / (Italy) Flavia Pennetta (champions)
2. (Czech Republic) Květa Peschke / (Slovenia) Katarina Srebotnik (finals)
3. (Zimbabwe) Cara Black / (Israel) Shahar Pe'er (semifinals)
4. (Belarus) Olga Govortsova / (Poland) Alicja Rosolska (semifinals)

== Draw ==
Key

- Q = Qualifier
- WC = Wild card
- LL = Lucky loser
- Alt = Alternate
- ITF = ITF entry
- PR = Protected ranking
- SR = Special ranking
- SE = Special exempt
- JE = Junior exempt
- JR = Junior Accelerator Programme entrant
- CO = College Accelerator Programme entrant
- NG = Next Gen Accelerator Program entrant
- w/o = Walkover
- r = Retired
- d = Defaulted

=== Draw ===
First round
1	(Argentina) G Dulko (Italy) F Pennetta	6	6
(Croatia) J Kostanić Tošić (Tunisia) S Sfar	4	2
(United States) L Huber (Serbia) J Janković	2	6	[10]
(Hungary) K Marosi (South Africa) C Scheepers	6	3	[7]
3	(Zimbabwe) C Black (Israel) S Pe'er	6	6
(Czech Republic) E Birnerová (Czech Republic) H Birnerová	3	4
(Romania) A Dulgheru (Hungary) Á Szávay	6	6
(Georgia (country)) M Chakhnashvili (Germany) J Schruff	4	3
(Germany) J Görges (Germany) J Wöhr	7	7
(Latvia) L Dekmeijere (Belarus) T Poutchek	5	6^{5}
(Germany) M Barthel (Germany) C Klaschka	7	4	[8]
4	(Belarus) O Govortsova (Poland) A Rosolska	5	6	[10]
(Serbia) A Ivanovic (Germany) A Petkovic	5	6	[6]
(United Kingdom) S Borwell (United States) R Kops-Jones	7	3	[10]
(Poland) K Jans (Czech Republic) V Uhlířová	4	5
2	(Czech Republic) K Peschke (Slovenia) K Srebotnik	6	7

Quarterfinals
1	(Argentina) G Dulko (Italy) F Pennetta	6	3	[10]
(United States) L Huber (Serbia) J Janković	1	6	[6]
3	(Zimbabwe) C Black (Israel) S Pe'er	3	6	[10]
(Romania) A Dulgheru (Hungary) Á Szávay	6	4	[7]
(Germany) J Görges (Germany) J Wöhr	6	3	[3]
4	(Belarus) O Govortsova (Poland) A Rosolska	3	6	[10]
(United Kingdom) S Borwell (United States) R Kops-Jones	2	4
2	(Czech Republic) K Peschke (Slovenia) K Srebotnik	6	6

Semifinals
1	(Argentina) G Dulko (Italy) F Pennetta	7	6
3	(Zimbabwe) C Black (Israel) S Pe'er	5	4
4	(Belarus) O Govortsova (Poland) A Rosolska	1	2
2	(Czech Republic) K Peschke (Slovenia) K Srebotnik	6	6

Finals
1	(Argentina) G Dulko (Italy) F Pennetta	3	7	[10]
2	(Czech Republic) K Peschke (Slovenia) K Srebotnik	6	6^{3}	[5]
