= 2011 WTA Tour Championships – Doubles =

Doubles
- 2011 WTA Tour Championships

Final
- Champions: (United States) Liezel Huber (United States) Lisa Raymond
- Runners-up: (Czech Republic) Květa Peschke (Slovenia) Katarina Srebotnik
- Score: 6–4, 6–4

Details
- Draw: 4
- Seeds: 4

Events
Singles	Doubles
- WTA Tour Championships

Liezel Huber and Lisa Raymond defeated Květa Peschke and Katarina Srebotnik in the final, 6–4, 6–4 to win the doubles tennis title at the 2011 WTA Tour Championships.

Gisela Dulko and Flavia Pennetta were the defending champions, but were defeated by Huber and Raymond in the semifinals.

== Seeds ==
1. (Czech Republic) Květa Peschke / (Slovenia) Katarina Srebotnik (final)
2. (United States) Liezel Huber / (United States) Lisa Raymond (champions)
3. (Argentina) Gisela Dulko / (Italy) Flavia Pennetta (semifinals)
4. (United States) Vania King / (Kazakhstan) Yaroslava Shvedova (semifinals)

== Draw ==
Key

- Q = Qualifier
- WC = Wild card
- LL = Lucky loser
- Alt = Alternate
- ITF = ITF entry
- PR = Protected ranking
- SR = Special ranking
- SE = Special exempt
- JE = Junior exempt
- JR = Junior Accelerator Programme entrant
- CO = College Accelerator Programme entrant
- NG = Next Gen Accelerator Program entrant
- w/o = Walkover
- r = Retired
- d = Defaulted

=== Finals ===
Semifinals
1	(Czech Republic) Květa Peschke (Slovenia) Katarina Srebotnik	6	6
4	(United States) Vania King (Kazakhstan) Yaroslava Shvedova	3	4
3	(Argentina) Gisela Dulko (Italy) Flavia Pennetta	6	3	[7]
2	(United States) Liezel Huber (United States) Lisa Raymond	4	6	[10]

Final
1	(Czech Republic) Květa Peschke (Slovenia) Katarina Srebotnik	4	4
2	(United States) Liezel Huber (United States) Lisa Raymond	6	6
