= 2011 WTA Tour Championships – Singles =

Singles
- 2011 WTA Tour Championships

Final
- Champion: (Czech Republic) Petra Kvitová
- Runner-up: (Belarus) Victoria Azarenka
- Score: 7–5, 4–6, 6–3

Details
- Draw: 8 (RR + elimination)
- Seeds: 8

Events
Singles	Doubles
- WTA Tour Championships

Petra Kvitová defeated Victoria Azarenka in the final, 7–5, 4–6, 6–3 to win the singles tennis title at the 2011 WTA Tour Championships. She was making her Tour Finals debut.

Kim Clijsters was the reigning champion, but did not qualify this year due to an ongoing abdominal injury.

In addition to Kvitová, Li Na made her debut in the event. Agnieszka Radwańska made her debut as a direct qualifier, after playing as an alternate in 2008 and 2009.

== Players ==
1. (Denmark) Caroline Wozniacki (round robin)
2. (Russia) Maria Sharapova (round robin, withdrew because of a left ankle sprain)
3. (Czech Republic) Petra Kvitová (champion)
4. (Belarus) Victoria Azarenka (final)
5. (China) Li Na (round robin)
6. (Russia) Vera Zvonareva (semifinals)
7. (Australia) Samantha Stosur (semifinals)
8. (Poland) Agnieszka Radwańska (round robin)

== Alternates ==
1. (France) Marion Bartoli (replaced Sharapova, round robin)
2. (Germany) Andrea Petkovic (Not Used)

== Draw ==
Key

- Q = Qualifier
- WC = Wild card
- LL = Lucky loser
- Alt = Alternate
- ITF = ITF entry
- PR = Protected ranking
- SR = Special ranking
- SE = Special exempt
- JE = Junior exempt
- JR = Junior Accelerator Programme entrant
- CO = College Accelerator Programme entrant
- NG = Next Gen Accelerator Program entrant
- w/o = Walkover
- r = Retired
- d = Defaulted

=== Finals ===
Semifinals
3	(Czech Republic) Petra Kvitová	5	6	6
7	(Australia) Samantha Stosur	7	3	3
4	(Belarus) Victoria Azarenka	6	6
6	(Russia) Vera Zvonareva	2	3

Final
3	(Czech Republic) Petra Kvitová	7	4	6
4	(Belarus) Victoria Azarenka	5	6	3

=== Red group ===
		(Denmark) Wozniacki	(Czech Republic) Kvitová	(Russia) Zvonareva	(Poland) Radwańska	RR W–L	Set W–L	Game W–L	Standings
1	(Denmark) Caroline Wozniacki		4–6, 2–6	2–6, 6–4, 3–6	5–7, 6–2, 6–4	1–2	3–5 (37.5%)	34–41 (45.3%)	4
3	(Czech Republic) Petra Kvitová	6–4, 6–2		6–2, 6–4	7–6^{(7–4)}, 6–3	3–0	6–0 (100%)	37–21 (63.8%)	1
6	(Russia) Vera Zvonareva	6–2, 4–6, 6–3	2–6, 4–6		6–1, 2–6, 5–7	1–2	3–5 (37.5%)	35–37 (48.6%)	2
8	(Poland) Agnieszka Radwańska	7–5, 2–6, 4–6	6–7^{(4–7)}, 3–6	1–6, 6–2, 7–5		1–2	3–5 (37.5%)	36–43 (45.6%)	3

Standings are determined by: 1. number of wins; 2. number of matches; 3. in two-players-ties, head-to-head records; 4. in three-players-ties, percentage of sets won, or of games won; 5. steering-committee decision.

=== White group ===
		(Russia) Sharapova (France) Bartoli	(Belarus) Azarenka	(China) Li	(Australia) Stosur	RR W–L	Set W–L	Game W–L	Standings
2 Alt	(Russia) Maria Sharapova (France) Marion Bartoli		5–7, 6–4, 6–4 (w/ Bartoli)	6–7^{(4–7)}, 4–6 (w/ Sharapova)	1–6, 5–7 (w/ Sharapova)	0–2; 1–0	0–4; 2–1	16–26; 17–15	X 4
4	(Belarus) Victoria Azarenka	7–5, 4–6, 4–6 (w/ Bartoli)		6–2, 6–2	6–2, 6–2	2–1	5–2 (71.4%)	39–25 (60.9%)	1
5	(China) Li Na	7–6^{(7–4)}, 6–4 (w/ Sharapova)	2–6, 2–6		1–6, 0–6	1–2	2–4 (33.3%)	18–34 (34.6%)	3
7	(Australia) Samantha Stosur	6–1, 7–5 (w/ Sharapova)	2–6, 2–6	6–1, 6–0		2–1	4–2 (66.7%)	29–19 (60.4%)	2

Standings are determined by: 1. number of wins; 2. number of matches; 3. in two-players-ties, head-to-head records; 4. in three-players-ties, percentage of sets won, or of games won; 5. steering-committee decision.

== See also ==
- WTA Tour Championships appearances
