= 2010 Porsche Tennis Grand Prix – Singles =

Singles
- 2010 Porsche Tennis Grand Prix

Final
- Champion: (Belgium) Justine Henin
- Runner-up: (Australia) Samantha Stosur
- Score: 6–4, 2–6, 6–1

Details
- Draw: 30
- Seeds: 8

Events
Singles	Doubles
- Porsche Tennis Grand Prix

Justine Henin defeated Samantha Stosur in the final, 6–4, 2–6, 6–1 to win the women's singles tennis title at the 2010 Stuttgart Open. This was Henin's first title since 2008, the year she first retired from professional tennis. Svetlana Kuznetsova was the defending champion, but she lost to Li Na in the second round.

== Seeds ==
The top two seeds received a bye into the second round.

1. (Denmark) Caroline Wozniacki (second round)
2. (Russia) Dinara Safina (quarterfinals)
3. (Russia) Svetlana Kuznetsova (second round)
4. (Serbia) Jelena Janković (quarterfinals)
5. (Poland) Agnieszka Radwańska (second round)
6. (Belarus) Victoria Azarenka (second round)
7. (Australia) Samantha Stosur (final)
8. (Belgium) Yanina Wickmayer (second round)

== Draw ==
Key

- Q = Qualifier
- WC = Wild card
- LL = Lucky loser
- Alt = Alternate
- ITF = ITF entry
- PR = Protected ranking
- SR = Special ranking
- SE = Special exempt
- JE = Junior exempt
- JR = Junior Accelerator Programme entrant
- CO = College Accelerator Programme entrant
- NG = Next Gen Accelerator Program entrant
- w/o = Walkover
- r = Retired
- d = Defaulted

=== Finals ===
Semifinals
Q	(Russia) Anna Lapushchenkova	5	3
7/WC	(Australia) Samantha Stosur	7	6
WC	(Belgium) Justine Henin	6	6
(Israel) Shahar Pe'er	3	2

Final
7/WC	(Australia) Samantha Stosur	4	6	1
WC	(Belgium) Justine Henin	6	2	6

=== Top half ===
First round
Q	(Tunisia) S Sfar	6	0	r
(Czech Republic) L Šafářová	2	3
(Belarus) O Govortsova	4	1
Q	(Russia) A Lapushchenkova	6	6
(Italy) F Pennetta	1	4
6	(Belarus) V Azarenka	6	6
3	(Russia) S Kuznetsova	6	6
(Slovenia) K Srebotnik	1	2
(China) N Li	6	6
(Italy) S Errani	1	1
Q	(Belarus) T Poutchek	2	2
(Romania) A Dulgheru	6	6
(France) M Bartoli	2	1
7/WC	(Australia) S Stosur	6	6

Second round
1	(Denmark) C Wozniacki	4	4
(Czech Republic) L Šafářová	6	6
Q	(Russia) A Lapushchenkova	6	6
6	(Belarus) V Azarenka	3	3
3	(Russia) S Kuznetsova	3	5
(China) N Li	6	7
(Romania) A Dulgheru	6	0	2
7/WC	(Australia) S Stosur	3	6	6

Quarterfinals
(Czech Republic) L Šafářová	6^{1}	6	1
Q	(Russia) A Lapushchenkova	7	1	6
(China) N Li	3	3
7/WC	(Australia) S Stosur	6	6

Semifinals
Q	(Russia) A Lapushchenkova	5	3
7/WC	(Australia) S Stosur	7	6

=== Bottom half ===
First round
8	(Belgium) Y Wickmayer	6	6
(Italy) F Schiavone	3	3
WC	(Belgium) J Henin	7	6
WC	(Germany) J Görges	6^{3}	1
LL	(Georgia (country)) M Chakhnashvili	3	4
Q	(Bulgaria) T Pironkova	6	6
(Argentina) G Dulko	2	2
4	(Serbia) J Janković	6	6
5	(Poland) A Radwańska	7	6
(Serbia) A Ivanovic	6^{4}	4
(Slovenia) P Hercog	3	6	1
(Israel) S Pe'er	6	3	6
(Hungary) Á Szávay	6	2	7
(Germany) A Petkovic	3	6	5

Second round
8	(Belgium) Y Wickmayer	3	5
WC	(Belgium) J Henin	6	7
Q	(Bulgaria) T Pironkova	2	2
4	(Serbia) J Janković	6	6
5	(Poland) A Radwańska	3	7	2
(Israel) S Pe'er	6	6^{4}	6
(Hungary) Á Szávay	6^{5}	6	0
2	(Russia) D Safina	7	3	6

Quarterfinals
WC	(Belgium) J Henin	3	7	6
4	(Serbia) J Janković	6	6^{4}	3
(Israel) S Pe'er	6	6
2	(Russia) D Safina	3	2

Semifinals
WC	(Belgium) J Henin	6	6
(Israel) S Pe'er	3	2
