= 2010 Porsche Tennis Grand Prix =

- Date: 24 April – 2 May
- Edition: 33rd
- Category: WTA Premier
- Draw: 30S / 16D
- Prize money: $700,000
- Surface: Clay / indoor
- Location: Stuttgart, Germany

Champions

Singles
- (Belgium) Justine Henin

Doubles
- (Argentina) Gisela Dulko / (Italy) Flavia Pennetta
← 2009 ·	Porsche Tennis Grand Prix	· 2011 →

The 2010 Porsche Tennis Grand Prix was a women's tennis tournament played on indoor clay courts. It was the 33rd edition of the Porsche Tennis Grand Prix, and was part of the Premier tournaments of the 2010 WTA Tour. It took place at the Porsche Arena in Stuttgart, Germany, from 24 April until 2 May 2010. Seven of the top ten ranked women and four former world number ones participated in the event. Justine Henin won the singles title.

== Finals ==
=== Singles ===
(Belgium) Justine Henin defeated (Australia) Samantha Stosur, 6–4, 2–6, 6–1

- It was Henin's first title of the year and 42nd of her career. It was her 2nd win at the event, also winning in 2007.

=== Doubles ===
(Argentina) Gisela Dulko / (Italy) Flavia Pennetta defeated (Czech Republic) Květa Peschke / (Slovenia) Katarina Srebotnik, 3–6, 7–6^{(7–3)}, [10–5]

== Entrants ==
=== Seeds ===
Player	Nationality	Ranking*	Seeding
Caroline Wozniacki	Denmark	2	1
Dinara Safina	Russia	3	2
Svetlana Kuznetsova	Russia	5	3
Jelena Janković	Serbia	7	4
Agnieszka Radwańska	Poland	8	5
Victoria Azarenka	Belarus	9	6
Samantha Stosur	Australia	10	7
Yanina Wickmayer	Belgium	12	8

- Rankings are as of April 19, 2010.

=== Other entrants ===
The following players received wildcards into the main draw:

- (Germany) Julia Görges
- (Belgium) Justine Henin
- (Australia) Samantha Stosur

The following players received entry from the qualifying draw:

- (Georgia (country)) Margalita Chakhnashvili (as a Lucky loser)
- (Russia) Anna Lapushchenkova
- (Bulgaria) Tsvetana Pironkova
- (Belarus) Tatiana Poutchek
- (Tunisia) Selima Sfar
