= 2011 Sony Ericsson Open =

Coordinates: 25°42′29″N 80°09′32″W

- Date: March 22 – April 3
- Edition: 27th
- Category: Masters 1000 (ATP); Premier Mandatory (WTA)
- Surface: Hard - outdoor
- Location: Key Biscayne, Florida, United States
- Venue: Tennis Center at Crandon Park

Champions

Men's singles
- (Serbia) Novak Djokovic

Women's singles
- (Belarus) Victoria Azarenka

Men's doubles
- (India) Mahesh Bhupathi / (India) Leander Paes

Women's doubles
- (Slovakia) Daniela Hantuchová / (Poland) Agnieszka Radwańska
- Miami Masters

The 2011 Sony Ericsson Open (also known as 2011 Miami Masters), a men's and women's tennis tournament, was held from March 22 to April 3, 2011. It was the 27th edition of the Miami Masters event and played on outdoor hard courts at the Tennis Center at Crandon Park in Miami, United States. The tournament was a part of 2011 ATP World Tour and 2011 WTA Tour, classified as ATP World Tour Masters 1000 and Premier Mandatory event respectively.

== Finals ==
=== Men's singles ===
(Serbia) Novak Djokovic defeated (Spain) Rafael Nadal, 4–6, 6–3, 7–6^{(7–4)}

- It was Djokovic's 4th title of the year and 22nd of his career. It was his 2nd Masters of the year and 7th of his career. It was his 2nd win at Miami, also winning in 2007. The win brought Djokovic to 26 consecutive match wins dating to the 2010 Davis Cup final.

=== Women's singles ===
(Belarus) Victoria Azarenka defeated (Russia) Maria Sharapova, 6–1, 6–4

- It was Azarenka's 1st title of the year and 6th of her career. It was her 4th career Premier win and 2nd at the Mandatory level. It was her 2nd win at Miami, also winning in 2009.

=== Men's doubles ===
(India) Mahesh Bhupathi / (India) Leander Paes defeated (Belarus) Max Mirnyi / (Canada) Daniel Nestor, 6–7^{(5–7)}, 6–2, [10–5]

=== Women's doubles ===
(Slovakia) Daniela Hantuchová / (Poland) Agnieszka Radwańska defeated (United States) Liezel Huber / (Russia) Nadia Petrova, 7–6^{(7–5)}, 2–6, [10–8]

== Tournament ==
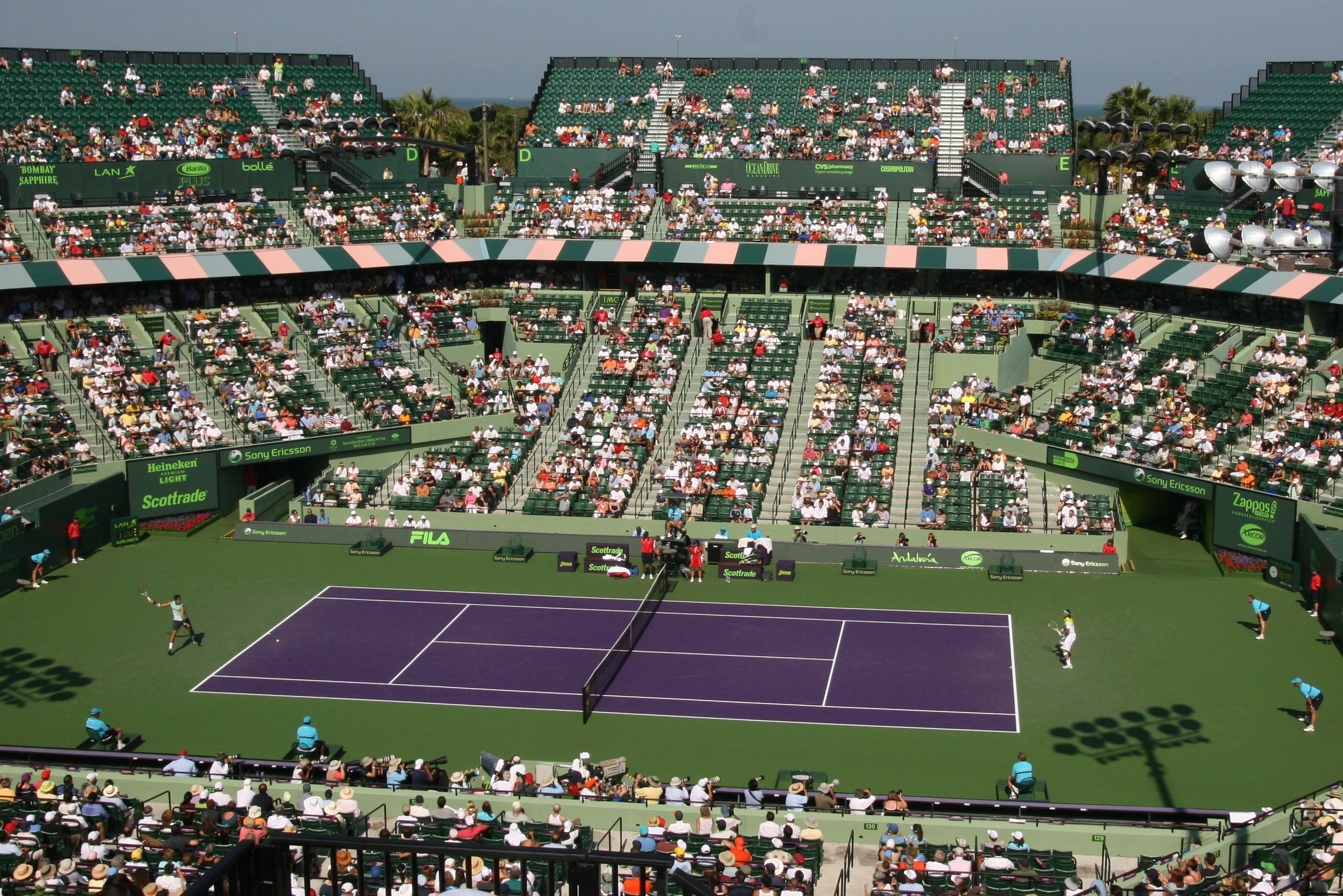

The 2011 Sony Ericsson Open took place at the Tennis Center at Crandon Park in Miami. This was the twenty seventh edition of the event and took place from March 22 to April 3, 2011. The tournament was part of the 2011 ATP World Tour and the 2011 WTA Tour. It was a Masters 1000 series event on the ATP Tour and a Premier Mandatory series event on the WTA Tour. It was the second event to be staged in 2011 in either category. The tournament was played on 12 Laykold Cushion Plus courts which have been rated slow by the ITF.

== Points and prize money ==
=== Point distribution ===
Stage	Men's singles	Men's doubles	Women's singles	Women's doubles
Champion	1000			
Runner up	600		700	
Semifinals	360		450	
Quarterfinals	180		250	
Round of 16	90		140	
Round of 32	45		80	
Round of 64	25 (10)		50	
Round of 128	10	–	5	–
Qualifier	12	–	30	–

=== Prize money ===
The total commitment prize money for this year's event was $4,500,000 each (WTA Tour and ATP World Tour).

Stage	Men's singles	Men's doubles	Women's singles	Women's doubles
Champion	$611,000	$200,200	$700,000	$237,000
Runner up	$298,200	$97,700	$350,000	$118,500
Semifinals	$149,450	$49,970	$150,000	$51,000
Quarterfinals	$76,195	$24,960	$64,700	$22,000
Round of 16	$40,160	$13,160	$32,000	$11,500
Round of 32	$21,495	$7,040	$18,740	$4,000
Round of 64	$11,605	–	$11,500	–
Round of 96	$7,115	–	$7,050	–
Final round qualifying	$2,120	–	$2,100	–
First round qualifying	$1,085	–	$1,050	–

== Players ==
=== Men's singles ===
==== Seeds ====
Athlete	Nationality	Ranking*	Seeding
Rafael Nadal	Spain	1	1
Novak Djokovic	Serbia	2	2
Roger Federer	Switzerland	3	3
Robin Söderling	Sweden	4	4
Andy Murray	Great Britain	5	5
David Ferrer	Spain	6	6
Tomáš Berdych	Czech Republic	7	7
Andy Roddick	United States	8	8
Fernando Verdasco	Spain	9	9
Jürgen Melzer	Austria	10	10
Nicolás Almagro	Spain	12	11
Stanislas Wawrinka	Switzerland	13	12
Mikhail Youzhny	Russia	14	13
Mardy Fish	United States	15	14
Jo-Wilfried Tsonga	France	16	15
Viktor Troicki	Serbia	17	16
Richard Gasquet	France	18	17
Marin Čilić	Croatia	20	18
Sam Querrey	United States	21	19
Albert Montañés	Spain	22	20
Alexandr Dolgopolov	Ukraine	23	21
Marcos Baghdatis	Cyprus	24	22
Michaël Llodra	France	25	23
Guillermo García López	Spain	26	24
Gilles Simon	France	27	25
Juan Ignacio Chela	Argentina	28	26
Thomaz Bellucci	Brazil	30	27
Ernests Gulbis	Latvia	31	28
Philipp Kohlschreiber	Germany	32	29
John Isner	United States	33	30
Milos Raonic	Canada	34	31
Juan Mónaco	Argentina	35	32

- Rankings are as of March 21, 2011.

==== Other entrants ====
The following players received wildcards into the main draw:

- (United States) James Blake
- (United States) Ryan Harrison
- (Croatia) Ivo Karlović
- (United States) Jack Sock
- (Australia) Bernard Tomic

The following player received entry using a protected ranking into the main draw:

- (Argentina) Juan Martín del Potro

The following players received entry from the qualifying draw:

- (United States) Alex Bogomolov Jr.
- (Chile) Paul Capdeville
- (Bulgaria) Grigor Dimitrov
- (Turkey) Marsel İlhan
- (United States) Robert Kendrick
- (Russia) Igor Kunitsyn
- (Italy) Paolo Lorenzi
- (Belgium) Olivier Rochus
- (United States) Michael Russell
- (Germany) Rainer Schüttler
- (United States) Ryan Sweeting
- (United States) Donald Young

==== Withdrawals ====
- (Netherlands) Thiemo de Bakker (wisdom teeth) → replaced by (Canada) Milos Raonic
- (Spain) Juan Carlos Ferrero → replaced by (Spain) Rubén Ramírez Hidalgo
- (Germany) Tommy Haas → replaced by (Slovenia) Blaž Kavčič
- (Australia) Lleyton Hewitt (foot surgery recovery) → replaced by (Portugal) Frederico Gil
- (France) Gaël Monfils (left wrist) → replaced by (Germany) Mischa Zverev
- (Argentina) David Nalbandian (torn hamstring & hernia) → replaced by (Brazil) Ricardo Mello
- (Spain) Tommy Robredo (adductor injury) → replaced by (India) Somdev Devvarman

=== Women's singles ===
==== Seeds ====
Athlete	Nationality	Ranking*	Seeding
Caroline Wozniacki	Denmark	1	1
Kim Clijsters	Belgium	2	2
Vera Zvonareva	Russia	3	3
Samantha Stosur	Australia	4	4
Francesca Schiavone	Italy	5	5
Jelena Janković	Serbia	6	6
Li Na	People's Republic of China	7	7
Victoria Azarenka	Belarus	9	8
Agnieszka Radwańska	Poland	10	9
Shahar Pe'er	Israel	12	10
Svetlana Kuznetsova	Russia	13	11
Petra Kvitová	Czech Republic	14	12
Flavia Pennetta	Italy	15	13
Kaia Kanepi	Estonia	16	14
Marion Bartoli	France	17	15
Maria Sharapova	Russia	18	16
Anastasia Pavlyuchenkova	Russia	19	17
Nadia Petrova	Russia	20	18
Ana Ivanovic	Serbia	21	19
Aravane Rezaï	France	22	20
Andrea Petkovic	Germany	23	21
Alisa Kleybanova	Russia	24	22
Yanina Wickmayer	Belgium	25	23
Maria Kirilenko	Russia	26	24
Dominika Cibulková	Slovakia	27	25
Alexandra Dulgheru	Romania	28	26
María José Martínez Sánchez	Spain	29	27
Jarmila Groth	Australia	30	28
Daniela Hantuchová	Slovakia	31	29
Lucie Šafářová	Czech Republic	32	30
Tsvetana Pironkova	Bulgaria	33	31
Klára Zakopalová	Czech Republic	34	32

- Rankings are as of March 7, 2011.

==== Other entrants ====
The following players received wildcards into the main draw:

- (Romania) Sorana Cîrstea
- (Germany) Sabine Lisicki
- (United States) Madison Keys
- (Russia) Dinara Safina
- (United States) Coco Vandeweghe
- (United Kingdom) Heather Watson
- (Croatia) Petra Martić
- (Croatia) Ajla Tomljanović

The following players received entry using a protected ranking into the main draw:

- (Hungary) Melinda Czink
- (Poland) Urszula Radwańska

The following players received entry from the qualifying draw:

- (Chinese Taipei) Chan Yung-jan
- (Australia) Jelena Dokić
- (United States) Jamie Hampton
- (Czech Republic) Lucie Hradecká
- (Russia) Vesna Manasieva
- (India) Sania Mirza
- (Russia) Ksenia Pervak
- (Netherlands) Arantxa Rus
- (United States) Sloane Stephens
- (Georgia (country)) Anna Tatishvili
- (Belarus) Anastasiya Yakimova
- (China) Zhang Shuai

==== Withdrawals ====
- (Uzbekistan) Akgul Amanmuradova → replaced by (France) Virginie Razzano
- (Ukraine) Alona Bondarenko → replaced by (Poland) Urszula Radwańska
- (Russia) Anna Chakvetadze → replaced by (Austria) Sybille Bammer
- (Italy) Romina Oprandi → replaced by (Spain) Anabel Medina Garrigues
- (Latvia) Anastasija Sevastova → replaced by (Germany) Kristina Barrois
- (Spain) Carla Suárez Navarro → replaced by (South Africa) Chanelle Scheepers
- (Thailand) Tamarine Tanasugarn → replaced by (Slovakia) Zuzana Ondrášková
- (United States) Serena Williams (pulmonary embolism and related upcoming surgery) → replaced by (Romania) Edina Gallovits-Hall
- (United States) Venus Williams (abdominal injury) → replaced by (Spain) Lourdes Domínguez Lino

== Viewership ==
=== Attendance ===
A record capacity of 14,625 crowd attended the men's final on Sunday, April 3. Also the tournament attracted a new record sum of 316,267 spectators breaking the previous one of 312,386 sold tickets set last year.
