= 2011 Porsche Tennis Grand Prix =

- Date: 16–24 April
- Edition: 34th
- Category: WTA Premier
- Surface: Clay
- Location: Stuttgart, Germany
- Venue: Porsche Arena

Champions

Singles
- (Germany) Julia Görges

Doubles
- (Germany) Sabine Lisicki / (Australia) Samantha Stosur
← 2010 ·	Porsche Tennis Grand Prix	· 2012 →

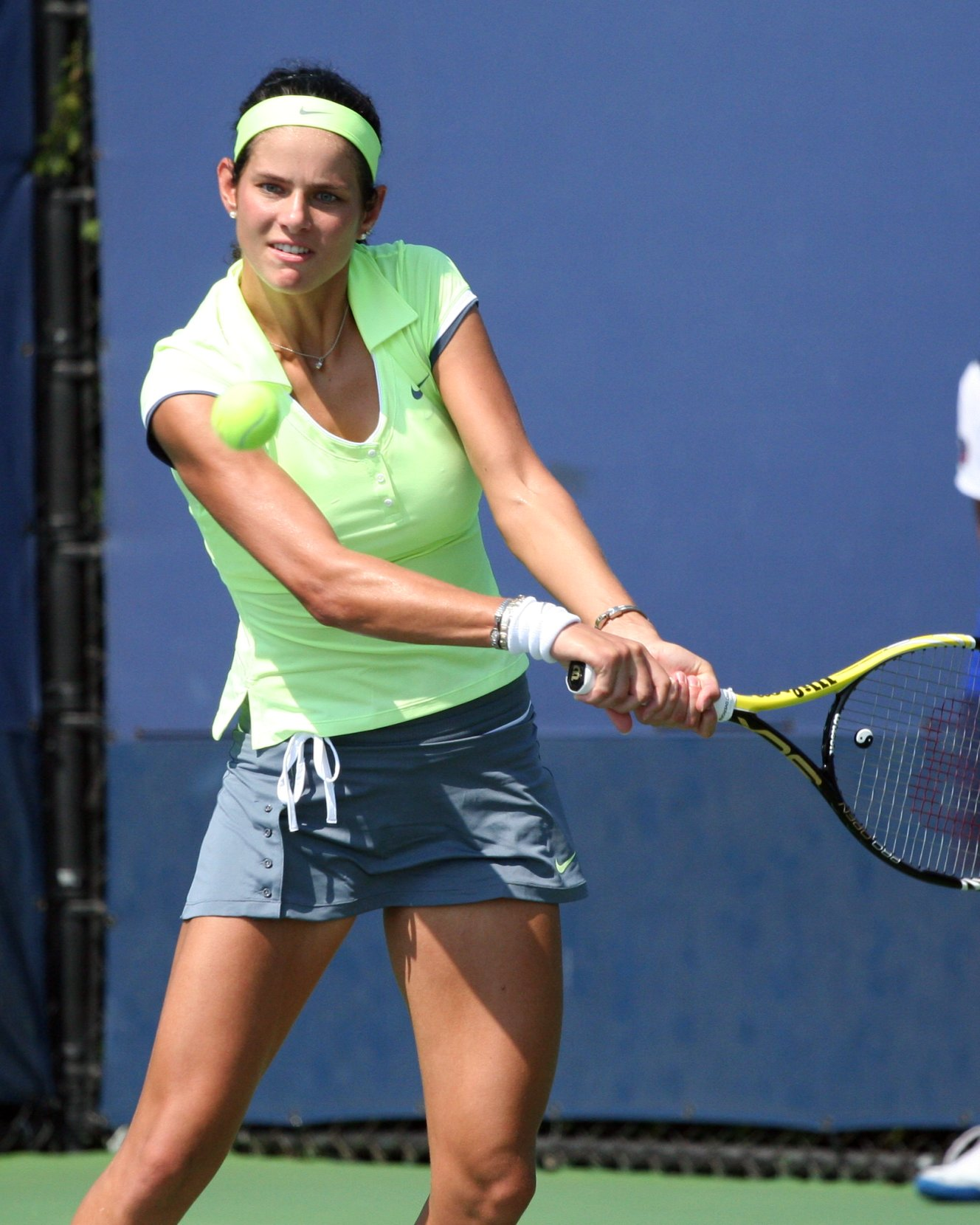
Julia Goerges

The 2011 Porsche Tennis Grand Prix was a women's tennis tournament played on indoor clay courts. It was the 34th edition of the Porsche Tennis Grand Prix, and was part of the Premier tournaments of the 2011 WTA Tour. It took place at the Porsche Arena in Stuttgart, Germany, from 16 April through 24 April 2011. Seven of the top ten ranked women participated in the tournament. Unseeded Julia Görges won the singles title.

== Finals ==
=== Singles ===
(Germany) Julia Görges defeated (Denmark) Caroline Wozniacki, 7–6^{(7–3)}, 6–3

- It was Görges' 1st title of the year and 2nd of her career.

=== Doubles ===
(Germany) Sabine Lisicki / (Australia) Samantha Stosur defeated (Germany) Kristina Barrois / (Germany) Jasmin Wöhr, 6–1, 7–6^{(7–5)}

== Prize money & points distribution ==
=== Points distribution ===
Stage	Women's singles	Women's doubles
Champion	470	
Runner up	320	
Semifinals	200	
Quarterfinals	120	
Round of 16	60	1
Round of 32	1	–
Qualifier	20	–
Qualifying final round	12	–
Qualifying second round	8	–
Qualifying first round	1	–

=== Prize money ===
The total commitment prize money for this year's event is $721,000.

Stage	Women's singles	Women's doubles (per team)
Champion	$111,000	$35,500
Runner up	$60,700	$18,500
Semifinals	$32,500	$9,600
Quarterfinals	$17,300	$5,100
Round of 16	$9,525	$2,720
Round of 32	$5,200	–
Qualifying final round	$2,530	–
Qualifying second round	$1,365	–
Qualifying first round	$750	–

== Entrants ==
=== Seeds ===
Country	Player	Rank^{1}	Seed
DEN	Caroline Wozniacki	1	1
RUS	Vera Zvonareva	3	2
ITA	Francesca Schiavone	4	3
BLR	Victoria Azarenka	5	4
AUS	Samantha Stosur	6	5
CHN	Li Na	7	6
SRB	Jelena Janković	8	7
FRA	Marion Bartoli	12	8

- Rankings are as of 11 April 2011.

=== Other entrants ===
The following players received wildcards into the main draw:

- (Germany) Kristina Barrois
- (Germany) Sabine Lisicki

The following players received entry from the qualifying draw:

- (Russia) Anna Chakvetadze
- (United States) Jamie Hampton
- (Netherlands) Michaëlla Krajicek
- (Austria) Tamira Paszek

The following players received entry from a Lucky loser spot:

- (Slovakia) Zuzana Kučová
- (Spain) Beatriz García Vidagany

=== Withdrawals ===
- (Czech Republic) Petra Kvitová (lower back injury)
- (Belgium) Yanina Wickmayer (knee injury)
