= 2021 St. Petersburg Ladies' Trophy =

- Date: 15 – 21 March
- Edition: 12th
- Category: WTA 500
- Prize money: $565,530
- Surface: Hard (indoor)
- Location: Saint Petersburg, Russia
- Venue: Sibur Arena

Champions

Singles
- (Russia) Daria Kasatkina

Doubles
- (Ukraine) Nadiia Kichenok / (Romania) Raluca Olaru
- St. Petersburg Ladies' Trophy

The 2021 St. Petersburg Ladies' Trophy is a professional tennis tournament played on indoor hard courts. It is the 12th edition of the tournament and a WTA 500 tournament on the 2021 WTA Tour. The tournament is held between 15 and 21 March 2021.

== Champions ==
=== Singles ===
- (Russia) Daria Kasatkina def. (Russia) Margarita Gasparyan, 6–3, 2–1, ret.

=== Doubles ===
- (Ukraine) Nadiia Kichenok / (Romania) Raluca Olaru def. (United States) Kaitlyn Christian / (United States) Sabrina Santamaria, 2–6, 6–3, [10–8].

== Point distribution ==
Event	W	F	SF	QF	Round of 16	Round of 32	Q	Q2	Q1
Singles	470	305	185	100	55	1	25	13	1
Doubles	470	305	185	100	1	—N/a	—N/a	—N/a	—N/a

== Prize money ==
Event	W	F	SF	QF	Round of 16	Round of 32^{1}	Q2	Q1
Singles	$68,570	$51,000	$32,400	$15,500	$8,200	$6,650	$5,000	$2,565
Doubles*	$25,230	$17,750	$10,000	$5,500	$3,500	—N/a	—N/a	—N/a

_{^{1}Qualifiers prize money is also the Round of 32 prize money.}
_{*per team}

== Singles main draw entrants ==
=== Seeds ===
Country	Player	Rank^{1}	Seed
RUS	Ekaterina Alexandrova	33	1
RUS	Veronika Kudermetova	34	2
FRA	Fiona Ferro	39	3
RUS	Svetlana Kuznetsova	41	4
RUS	Anastasia Pavlyuchenkova	43	5
LAT	Jeļena Ostapenko	51	6
FRA	Kristina Mladenovic	53	7
RUS	Daria Kasatkina	58	8

- ^{1} Rankings as of March 8, 2021.

=== Other entrants ===
The following players received wildcards into the singles main draw:

- (Russia) Margarita Gasparyan
- (Russia) Daria Mishina
- (Russia) Vera Zvonareva

The following player received entry into the singles main draw using a protected ranking:

- (Belarus) Vera Lapko

The following players received entry from the qualifying draw:

- (Romania) Jaqueline Cristian
- (Russia) Anastasia Gasanova
- (Russia) Kamilla Rakhimova
- (Australia) Arina Rodionova
- (Denmark) Clara Tauson
- (China) Wang Xinyu

The following player received entry as a lucky loser:

- (Turkey) Çağla Büyükakçay

=== Withdrawals ===
Before the tournament

- (Switzerland) Belinda Bencic → replaced by (Belgium) Kirsten Flipkens
- (Romania) Sorana Cîrstea → replaced by (Belarus) Aliaksandra Sasnovich
- (Belgium) Elise Mertens → replaced by (Turkey) Çağla Büyükakçay
- (Kazakhstan) Yulia Putintseva → replaced by (Russia) Daria Kasatkina
- (United States) Alison Riske → replaced by (Ukraine) Katarina Zavatska
- (Latvia) Anastasija Sevastova → replaced by (Belarus) Vera Lapko
- (Switzerland) Jil Teichmann → replaced by (Bulgaria) Viktoriya Tomova
- (Romania) Patricia Maria Țig → replaced by (Romania) Ana Bogdan
- (Croatia) Donna Vekić → replaced by (Spain) Paula Badosa

=== Retirements ===
- (Belarus) Vera Lapko (cramping)
- (Russia) Margarita Gasparyan (lower-back injury)

== Doubles main draw entrants ==
=== Seeds ===
Country	Player	Country	Player	Rank^{1}	Seed
UKR	Nadiia Kichenok	ROU	Raluca Olaru	98	1
USA	Kaitlyn Christian	USA	Sabrina Santamaria	130	2
JPN	Makoto Ninomiya	CZE	Renata Voráčová	132	3
BLR	Lidziya Marozava	BLR	Aliaksandra Sasnovich	134	4

- ^{1} Rankings as of March 8, 2021.

=== Other entrants ===
The following pair received a wildcard into the doubles main draw:

- (Russia) Daria Mishina / (Russia) Ekaterina Shalimova
- (Russia) Elena Vesnina / (Russia) Vera Zvonareva

The following pairs received entry using protected rankings:

- (Georgia (country)) Oksana Kalashnikova / (Russia) Alla Kudryavtseva
- (Serbia) Aleksandra Krunić / (Russia) Alexandra Panova

=== Withdrawals ===
Before the tournament

- (Spain) Georgina García Pérez / (Netherlands) Bibiane Schoofs → replaced by (Russia) Ekaterina Alexandrova / (Russia) Yana Sizikova
- (Ukraine) Lyudmyla Kichenok / (Latvia) Jeļena Ostapenko → replaced by (Latvia) Jeļena Ostapenko / (Russia) Valeria Savinykh
- (Russia) Veronika Kudermetova / (Belgium) Elise Mertens → replaced by (Romania) Laura Ioana Paar / (Germany) Julia Wachaczyk
- (Belarus) Lidziya Marozava / (Romania) Andreea Mitu → replaced by (Belarus) Lidziya Marozava / (Belarus) Aliaksandra Sasnovich
- (Belarus) Vera Lapko / (Sweden) Cornelia Lister → replaced by (Turkey) Çağla Büyükakçay / (Poland) Magdalena Fręch
