= 2021 St. Petersburg Ladies' Trophy – Singles =

Singles
- 2021 St. Petersburg Ladies' Trophy

Final
- Champion: (Russia) Daria Kasatkina
- Runner-up: (Russia) Margarita Gasparyan
- Score: 6–3, 2–1, ret.

Details
- Draw: 28 (6 Q / 4 WC )
- Seeds: 8

Events
Singles	Doubles
- St. Petersburg Ladies' Trophy

Daria Kasatkina won the women's singles title at the 2021 St. Petersburg Ladies' Trophy, after Margarita Gasparyan retired from the final with the scoreline at 6–3, 2–1.

Kiki Bertens was the two-time defending champion, but she chose not to participate.

This was the first tournament since Oakland in 1993 in which seven of the eight quarterfinalists were all from the same country. It was also the first tournament in WTA history in which all four semifinalists represented Russia.

== Seeds ==
1. (Russia) Ekaterina Alexandrova (quarterfinals)
2. (Russia) Veronika Kudermetova (quarterfinals)
3. (France) Fiona Ferro (second round)
4. (Russia) Svetlana Kuznetsova (semifinals)
5. (Russia) Anastasia Pavlyuchenkova (second round)
6. (Latvia) Jeļena Ostapenko (second round)
7. (France) Kristina Mladenovic (first round)
8. (Russia) Daria Kasatkina (champion)

== Draw ==
Key

- Q = Qualifier
- WC = Wild card
- LL = Lucky loser
- Alt = Alternate
- ITF = ITF entry
- PR = Protected ranking
- SR = Special ranking
- SE = Special exempt
- JE = Junior exempt
- JR = Junior Accelerator Programme entrant
- CO = College Accelerator Programme entrant
- NG = Next Gen Accelerator Program entrant
- w/o = Walkover
- r = Retired
- d = Defaulted

=== Finals ===
Semifinals
WC	(Russia) Margarita Gasparyan	6	7^{11}
WC	(Russia) Vera Zvonareva	3	6^{9}
4	(Russia) Svetlana Kuznetsova	6	0	2
8	(Russia) Daria Kasatkina	1	6	6

Final
WC	(Russia) Margarita Gasparyan	3	1^{r}
8	(Russia) Daria Kasatkina	6	2

=== Top half ===
First round
(Switzerland) S Vögele	0	6	4
(Czech Republic) T Martincová	6	4	6
(Czech Republic) K Siniaková	6	6
(Belgium) K Flipkens	1	2
WC	(Russia) M Gasparyan	6^{1}	6	6
7	(France) K Mladenovic	7^{7}	1	1
Q	(Australia) Ar Rodionova	1	3
WC	(Russia) V Zvonareva	6	6
(Ukraine) K Zavatska	2	7^{8}	5
Q	(Russia) A Gasanova	6	6^{6}	7
LL	(Turkey) Ç Büyükakçay	4	4
5	(Russia) A Pavlyuchenkova	6	6

Second round
1	(Russia) E Alexandrova	6	6
(Czech Republic) T Martincová	3	4
(Czech Republic) K Siniaková	4	4
WC	(Russia) M Gasparyan	6	6
3	(France) F Ferro	7^{8}	5	6^{2}
WC	(Russia) V Zvonareva	6^{6}	7	7^{7}
Q	(Russia) A Gasanova	1	7^{10}	7^{7}
5	(Russia) A Pavlyuchenkova	6	6^{8}	6^{4}

Quarterfinals
1	(Russia) E Alexandrova	2	5
WC	(Russia) M Gasparyan	6	7
WC	(Russia) V Zvonareva	6	6
Q	(Russia) A Gasanova	3	1

Semifinals
WC	(Russia) M Gasparyan	6	7^{11}
WC	(Russia) V Zvonareva	3	6^{9}

=== Bottom half ===
First round
6	(Latvia) J Ostapenko	6	6
(Spain) P Badosa	2	2
Q	(Romania) J Cristian	6^{3}	6	2
PR	(Belarus) V Lapko	7^{7}	4	1^{r}
Q	(China) Xin Wang	6	5	7
(Bulgaria) V Tomova	1	7	5
8	(Russia) D Kasatkina	6	7^{7}
Q	(Denmark) C Tauson	4	6^{0}
(Romania) A Bogdan	6	2	1
(Belarus) A Sasnovich	2	6	6
WC	(Russia) D Mishina	1	7^{7}	1
Q	(Russia) K Rakhimova	6	6^{2}	6

Second round
6	(Latvia) J Ostapenko	3	6^{9}
Q	(Romania) J Cristian	6	7^{11}
Q	(China) Xin Wang	1	5
4	(Russia) S Kuznetsova	6	7
8	(Russia) D Kasatkina	5	6	7^{7}
(Belarus) A Sasnovich	7	3	6^{2}
Q	(Russia) K Rakhimova	5	6	6^{5}
2	(Russia) V Kudermetova	7	3	7^{7}

Quarterfinals
Q	(Romania) J Cristian	7^{7}	3	3
4	(Russia) S Kuznetsova	6^{5}	6	6
8	(Russia) D Kasatkina	1	6	6
2	(Russia) V Kudermetova	6	1	2

Semifinals
4	(Russia) S Kuznetsova	6	0	2
8	(Russia) D Kasatkina	1	6	6

== Qualifying ==
=== Seeds ===
1. (Denmark) Clara Tauson (qualified)
2. (Bulgaria) Viktoriya Tomova (moved to main draw)
3. (Romania) Monica Niculescu (first round)
4. (Russia) Natalia Vikhlyantseva (first round)
5. (Russia) Kamilla Rakhimova (qualified)
6. (China) Wang Xinyu (qualified)
7. (Romania) Jaqueline Cristian (qualified)
8. (Poland) Magdalena Fręch (qualifying competition)
9. (Australia) Arina Rodionova (qualified)
10. (Turkey) Çağla Büyükakçay (qualifying competition, lucky loser)
11. (Netherlands) Lesley Pattinama Kerkhove (qualifying competition)
12. (Romania) Laura Ioana Paar (first round)

=== Qualifiers ===
1. (Denmark) Clara Tauson
2. (Romania) Jaqueline Cristian
3. (Russia) Anastasia Gasanova
4. (Australia) Arina Rodionova
5. (Russia) Kamilla Rakhimova
6. (China) Wang Xinyu

=== Lucky loser ===
1. (Turkey) Çağla Büyükakçay

=== Qualifying draw ===
==== First qualifier ====
First round
1	(Denmark) Clara Tauson	7	6
WC	(Russia) Ekaterina Shalimova	5	3
(Georgia (country)) Ekaterine Gorgodze	6	6^{0}	3
11	(Netherlands) Lesley Pattinama Kerkhove	0	7^{7}	6

Qualifying competition
1	(Denmark) Clara Tauson	7	6
11	(Netherlands) Lesley Pattinama Kerkhove	5	2

==== Second qualifier ====
First round
Alt	(Russia) Sofya Lansere	3	0
WC	(Russia) Alina Charaeva	6	6
(Serbia) Natalija Kostić	1	3
7	(Romania) Jaqueline Cristian	6	6

Qualifying competition
WC	(Russia) Alina Charaeva	6	1	2
7	(Romania) Jaqueline Cristian	4	6	6

==== Third qualifier ====
First round
3	(Romania) Monica Niculescu	3	4
WC	(Croatia) Ana Konjuh	6	6
(Russia) Anastasia Gasanova	6	6
12	(Romania) Laura Ioana Paar	4	3

Qualifying competition
WC	(Croatia) Ana Konjuh	4	3
(Russia) Anastasia Gasanova	6	6

==== Fourth qualifier ====
First round
4	(Russia) Natalia Vikhlyantseva	6	4	1
(Russia) Valeria Savinykh	2	6	6
(Liechtenstein) Kathinka von Deichmann	4	4
9	(Australia) Arina Rodionova	6	6

Qualifying competition
(Russia) Valeria Savinykh	3	4
9	(Australia) Arina Rodionova	6	6

==== Fifth qualifier ====
First round
5	(Russia) Kamilla Rakhimova	6	4	6
(Serbia) Aleksandra Krunić	2	6	4
WC	(Russia) Polina Kudermetova	1	3
8	(Poland) Magdalena Fręch	6	6

Qualifying competition
5	(Russia) Kamilla Rakhimova	6	2	6
8	(Poland) Magdalena Fręch	3	6	2

==== Sixth qualifier ====
First round
6	(China) Wang Xinyu	6	6
(Russia) Marina Melnikova	2	3
(Croatia) Jana Fett	3	6	5
10	(Turkey) Çağla Büyükakçay	6	4	7

Qualifying competition
6	(China) Wang Xinyu	6	6
10	(Turkey) Çağla Büyükakçay	2	3
