= 2016 St. Petersburg Ladies' Trophy =

- Date: 8–14 February
- Edition: 7th
- Category: WTA Premier
- Prize money: $753,000
- Surface: Hard (indoor)
- Location: Saint Petersburg, Russia
- Venue: Sibur Arena

Champions

Singles
- (Italy) Roberta Vinci

Doubles
- (Switzerland) Martina Hingis / (India) Sania Mirza
- St. Petersburg Ladies' Trophy

The 2016 St. Petersburg Ladies' Trophy was a professional tennis tournament played on indoor hard courts. This was the seventh edition of the tournament and the first as a WTA Premier tournament. It was part of the 2016 WTA Tour and was held between 8 February and 14 February 2016.

== Finals ==
=== Singles ===
- (Italy) Roberta Vinci defeated (Switzerland) Belinda Bencic 6–4, 6–3

=== Doubles ===
- (Switzerland) Martina Hingis / (India) Sania Mirza defeated (Russia) Vera Dushevina / (Czech Republic) Barbora Krejčíková 6–3, 6–1

== Point distribution ==
Event	W	F	SF	QF	Round of 16	Round of 32	Q	Q3	Q2	Q1
Singles	470	305	185	100	55	1	25	18	13	1
Doubles	470	305	185	100	1	—N/a	—N/a	—N/a	—N/a	—N/a

== Prize money ==
Event	W	F	SF	QF	Round of 16	Round of 32^{1}	Q3	Q2	Q1
Singles	$128,450	$68,585	$36,635	$19,690	$10,560	$6,700	$3,010	$1,600	$890
Doubles*	$40,170	$21,465	$11,730	$5,965	$3,240	—N/a	—N/a	—N/a	—N/a

_{^{1}Qualifiers prize money is also the Round of 32 prize money.}
_{*per team}

== Singles main draw entrants ==
=== Seeds ===
Country	Player	Rank^{1}	Seed
SUI	Belinda Bencic	11	1
ITA	Roberta Vinci	16	2
DEN	Caroline Wozniacki	18	3
SRB	Ana Ivanovic	20	4
RUS	Anastasia Pavlyuchenkova	26	5
~~SVK~~	~~Anna Karolína Schmiedlová~~	~~29~~	~~6~~
FRA	Kristina Mladenovic	30	7
~~FRA~~	~~Alizé Cornet~~	~~36~~	~~8~~
ROU	Monica Niculescu	37	9

- ^{1} Rankings as of February 1, 2016.

=== Other entrants ===
The following players received wildcards into the singles main draw:

- (Russia) Elena Vesnina
- (Russia) Natalia Vikhlyantseva
- (Denmark) Caroline Wozniacki

The following players received entry from the qualifying draw:

- (Czech Republic) Klára Koukalová
- (Ukraine) Kateryna Kozlova
- (Austria) Tamira Paszek
- (Czech Republic) Kateřina Siniaková

The following player received entry as lucky losers:

- (Germany) Laura Siegemund
- (Romania) Patricia Maria Țig

=== Withdrawals ===
- (Germany) Mona Barthel → replaced by (Hungary) Tímea Babos
- (Romania) Irina-Camelia Begu → replaced by (Latvia) Jeļena Ostapenko
- (Czech Republic) Petra Cetkovská → replaced by (Russia) Daria Kasatkina
- (France) Alizé Cornet (low back injury) → replaced by (Romania) Patricia Maria Țig
- (Romania) Alexandra Dulgheru → replaced by (Belgium) Kirsten Flipkens
- (Italy) Karin Knapp → replaced by (Serbia) Bojana Jovanovski
- (Slovakia) Anna Karolína Schmiedlová (ankle sprain) → replaced by (Germany) Laura Siegemund

== Doubles main draw entrants ==
=== Seeds ===
Country	Player	Country	Player	Rank^{1}	Seed
SUI	Martina Hingis	IND	Sania Mirza	2	1
CZE	Andrea Hlaváčková	CZE	Lucie Hradecká	22	2
ESP	Anabel Medina Garrigues	ESP	Arantxa Parra Santonja	59	3
ROU	Monica Niculescu	GER	Laura Siegemund	73	4

- ^{1} Rankings as of February 8, 2016.

=== Other entrants ===
The following pair received a wildcard into the doubles main draw:

- (Russia) Anastasia Bukhanko / (Slovakia) Dominika Cibulková

=== Retirements ===
- (Romania) Monica Niculescu (abdominal injury)
