= 2021 St. Petersburg Ladies' Trophy – Doubles =

Doubles
- 2021 St. Petersburg Ladies' Trophy

Final
- Champions: (Ukraine) Nadiia Kichenok (Romania) Raluca Olaru
- Runners-up: (United States) Kaitlyn Christian (United States) Sabrina Santamaria
- Score: 2–6, 6–3, [10–8]

Events
Singles	Doubles
- St. Petersburg Ladies' Trophy

Shuko Aoyama and Ena Shibahara were the defending champions, but they decided not to participate this year.

Nadiia Kichenok and Raluca Olaru won the title, defeating Kaitlyn Christian and Sabrina Santamaria in the final, 2–6, 6–3, [10–8].

== Seeds ==
1. (Ukraine) Nadiia Kichenok / (Romania) Raluca Olaru (champions)
2. (United States) Kaitlyn Christian / (United States) Sabrina Santamaria (final)
3. (Japan) Makoto Ninomiya / (Czech Republic) Renata Voráčová (quarterfinals)
4. (Belarus) Lidziya Marozava / (Belarus) Aliaksandra Sasnovich (quarterfinals)

== Draw ==
Key

- Q = Qualifier
- WC = Wild card
- LL = Lucky loser
- Alt = Alternate
- ITF = ITF entry
- PR = Protected ranking
- SR = Special ranking
- SE = Special exempt
- JE = Junior exempt
- JR = Junior Accelerator Programme entrant
- CO = College Accelerator Programme entrant
- NG = Next Gen Accelerator Program entrant
- w/o = Walkover
- r = Retired
- d = Defaulted

First round
1	(Ukraine) N Kichenok (Romania) R Olaru	6	7^{7}
(Latvia) J Ostapenko (Russia) V Savinykh	3	6^{1}
(Australia) Ar Rodionova (Netherlands) R van der Hoek	6	6
(Russia) E Alexandrova (Russia) Y Sizikova	2	2
3	(Japan) M Ninomiya (Czech Republic) R Voráčová	3	6	[12]
(Russia) N Dzalamidze (Russia) M Gasparyan	6	1	[10]
PR	(Serbia) A Krunić (Russia) A Panova	4	4
(Romania) M Niculescu (Netherlands) L Pattinama Kerkhove	6	6
PR	(Georgia (country)) O Kalashnikova (Russia) A Kudryavtseva	6	6
(Romania) LI Paar (Germany) J Wachaczyk	2	4
WC	(Russia) D Mishina (Russia) E Shalimova	3	2
4	(Belarus) L Marozava (Belarus) A Sasnovich	6	6
WC	(Russia) E Vesnina (Russia) V Zvonareva	6	6
Alt	(Turkey) C Büyükakçay (Poland) M Fręch	2	1
(Georgia (country)) E Gorgodze (Russia) K Rakhimova	6	5	[7]
2	(United States) K Christian (United States) S Santamaria	4	7	[10]

Quarterfinals
1	(Ukraine) N Kichenok (Romania) R Olaru	6	6
(Australia) Ar Rodionova (Netherlands) R van der Hoek	3	1
3	(Japan) M Ninomiya (Czech Republic) R Voráčová	3	4
(Romania) M Niculescu (Netherlands) L Pattinama Kerkhove	6	6
PR	(Georgia (country)) O Kalashnikova (Russia) A Kudryavtseva	4	7	[16]
4	(Belarus) L Marozava (Belarus) A Sasnovich	6	5	[14]
WC	(Russia) E Vesnina (Russia) V Zvonareva	7	3	[9]
2	(United States) K Christian (United States) S Santamaria	5	6	[11]

Semifinals
1	(Ukraine) N Kichenok (Romania) R Olaru	6	7
(Romania) M Niculescu (Netherlands) L Pattinama Kerkhove	1	5
PR	(Georgia (country)) O Kalashnikova (Russia) A Kudryavtseva	7	4	[4]
2	(United States) K Christian (United States) S Santamaria	5	6	[10]

Final
1	(Ukraine) N Kichenok (Romania) R Olaru	2	6	[10]
2	(United States) K Christian (United States) S Santamaria	6	3	[8]
