= 2019 St. Petersburg Ladies' Trophy – Singles =

Singles
- 2019 St. Petersburg Ladies' Trophy

Final
- Champion: (Netherlands) Kiki Bertens
- Runner-up: (Croatia) Donna Vekić
- Score: 7–6^{(7–2)}, 6–4

Details
- Draw: 28 (4 Q / 4 WC )
- Seeds: 8

Events
Singles	Doubles
- St. Petersburg Ladies' Trophy

Petra Kvitová was the defending champion, but lost to Donna Vekić in the quarterfinals.

Kiki Bertens won the title, defeating Vekić in the final, 7–6^{(7–2)}, 6–4. It was her eighth WTA Tour singles title.

== Seeds ==
The top four seeds received a bye into the second round.

1. (Czech Republic) Petra Kvitová (quarterfinals)
2. (Netherlands) Kiki Bertens (champion)
3. (Russia) Daria Kasatkina (quarterfinals)
4. (Belarus) Aryna Sabalenka (semifinals)
5. (Germany) Julia Görges (second round)
6. (Latvia) Jeļena Ostapenko (second round)
7. (Slovakia) Dominika Cibulková (withdrew)
8. (Croatia) Donna Vekić (final)

== Draw ==
Key

- Q = Qualifier
- WC = Wild card
- LL = Lucky loser
- Alt = Alternate
- ITF = ITF entry
- PR = Protected ranking
- SR = Special ranking
- SE = Special exempt
- JE = Junior exempt
- JR = Junior Accelerator Programme entrant
- CO = College Accelerator Programme entrant
- NG = Next Gen Accelerator Program entrant
- w/o = Walkover
- r = Retired
- d = Defaulted

=== Finals ===
Semifinals
8	(Croatia) Donna Vekić	6	6
WC	(Russia) Vera Zvonareva	2	2
4	(Belarus) Aryna Sabalenka	6^{5}	2
2	(Netherlands) Kiki Bertens	7^{7}	6

Final
8	(Croatia) Donna Vekić	6^{2}	4
2	(Netherlands) Kiki Bertens	7^{7}	6

=== Top half ===
First round
WC	(Belarus) V Azarenka	6	6
Q	(Russia) M Gasparyan	4	1
WC	(Serbia) O Danilović	2	1
LL	(Russia) V Kudermetova	6	6
PR	(Switzerland) T Bacsinszky	6	1	3
8	(Croatia) D Vekić	4	6	6
(Australia) D Gavrilova	0	4
(Russia) M Sharapova	6	6
WC	(Russia) E Makarova	3	4
WC	(Russia) V Zvonareva	6	6
(Greece) M Sakkari	2	5
5	(Germany) J Görges	6	7

Second round
1	(Czech Republic) P Kvitová	6	7^{7}
WC	(Belarus) V Azarenka	2	6^{3}
LL	(Russia) V Kudermetova	4	3
8	(Croatia) D Vekić	6	6
3	(Russia) D Kasatkina	w/o
(Russia) M Sharapova
WC	(Russia) V Zvonareva	4	6	6
5	(Germany) J Görges	6	4	4

Quarterfinals
1	(Czech Republic) P Kvitová	4	1
8	(Croatia) D Vekić	6	6
3	(Russia) D Kasatkina	3	6^{3}
WC	(Russia) V Zvonareva	6	7^{7}

Semifinals
8	(Croatia) D Vekić	6	6
WC	(Russia) V Zvonareva	2	2

=== Bottom half ===
First round
LL	(United Kingdom) K Boulter	5	6	1
Q	(Russia) E Alexandrova	7	4	6
Q	(Czech Republic) T Martincová	4	6	6
(Kazakhstan) Y Putintseva	6	2	2
(Belgium) A Van Uytvanck	6	6
(Belgium) K Flipkens	2	4
6	(Latvia) J Ostapenko	6	0	6
(France) K Mladenovic	1	6	0
(France) A Cornet	5	6^{4}
(Russia) A Pavlyuchenkova	7	7^{7}
Q	(Belgium) Y Bonaventure	6	7^{7}
(Czech Republic) K Siniaková	4	6^{3}

Second round
Q	(Russia) E Alexandrova	7	6
Q	(Czech Republic) T Martincová	5	2
(Belgium) A Van Uytvanck	1	4
4	(Belarus) A Sabalenka	6	6
6	(Latvia) J Ostapenko	4	4
(Russia) A Pavlyuchenkova	6	6
Q	(Belgium) Y Bonaventure	4	2
2	(Netherlands) K Bertens	6	6

Quarterfinals
Q	(Russia) E Alexandrova	3	4
4	(Belarus) A Sabalenka	6	6
(Russia) A Pavlyuchenkova	2	6	0
2	(Netherlands) K Bertens	6	3	6

Semifinals
4	(Belarus) A Sabalenka	6^{5}	2
2	(Netherlands) K Bertens	7^{7}	6

== Qualifying ==
=== Seeds ===
1. (Slovakia) Viktória Kužmová (second round)
2. (Switzerland) Belinda Bencic (second round)
3. (Belarus) Vera Lapko (first round)
4. (Germany) Andrea Petkovic (second round)
5. (United States) Bernarda Pera (first round)
6. (Russia) Ekaterina Alexandrova (qualified)
7. (Spain) Lara Arruabarrena (first round)
8. (Russia) Margarita Gasparyan (qualified)

=== Qualifiers ===
1. (Belgium) Ysaline Bonaventure
2. (Russia) Margarita Gasparyan
3. (Russia) Ekaterina Alexandrova
4. (Czech Republic) Tereza Martincová

=== Lucky loser ===
1. (Russia) Veronika Kudermetova
2. (United Kingdom) Katie Boulter

=== Qualifying draw ===
==== First qualifier ====
First round
1	(Slovakia) Viktória Kužmová	6	6
(Serbia) Dejana Radanović	1	4
WC	(Croatia) Tena Lukas	2	4
(Belgium) Ysaline Bonaventure	6	6
(Ukraine) Katarina Zavatska	6	3	6
(Czech Republic) Tereza Smitková	2	6	3
(United Kingdom) Katie Boulter	7^{7}	3	6
5	(United States) Bernarda Pera	6^{5}	6	1

Second round
1	(Slovakia) Viktória Kužmová	4	3
(Belgium) Ysaline Bonaventure	6	6
(Ukraine) Katarina Zavatska	7^{7}	1	5
(United Kingdom) Katie Boulter	6^{1}	6	7

Qualifying competition
(Belgium) Ysaline Bonaventure	6^{3}	6	6
(United Kingdom) Katie Boulter	7^{7}	4	2

==== Second qualifier ====
First round
2	(Switzerland) Belinda Bencic	6	6
(Ukraine) Anhelina Kalinina	2	1
(Russia) Veronika Kudermetova	6	6
(Italy) Martina Trevisan	2	3
(Italy) Jasmine Paolini	7^{7}	0	1
(Russia) Liudmila Samsonova	6^{4}	6	6
(Japan) Misaki Doi	4	2
8	(Russia) Margarita Gasparyan	6	6

Second round
2	(Switzerland) Belinda Bencic	4	3
(Russia) Veronika Kudermetova	6	6
(Russia) Liudmila Samsonova	3	3
8	(Russia) Margarita Gasparyan	6	6

Qualifying competition
(Russia) Veronika Kudermetova	1	0
8	(Russia) Margarita Gasparyan	6	6

==== Third qualifier ====
First round
3	(Belarus) Vera Lapko	2	6	3
(Czech Republic) Anastasia Zarycká	6	2	6
(Russia) Anna Kalinskaya	6	7
WC	(Croatia) Ana Konjuh	4	5
(Greece) Valentini Grammatikopoulou	1	1
(Croatia) Jana Fett	6	6
(Russia) Valentina Ivakhnenko	1	0^{r}
6	(Russia) Ekaterina Alexandrova	6	3

Second round
(Czech Republic) Anastasia Zarycká	4	3
(Russia) Anna Kalinskaya	6	6
(Croatia) Jana Fett	6^{7}	0
6	(Russia) Ekaterina Alexandrova	7^{9}	6

Qualifying competition
(Russia) Anna Kalinskaya	6^{4}	0
6	(Russia) Ekaterina Alexandrova	7^{7}	6

==== Fourth qualifier ====
First round
4	(Germany) Andrea Petkovic	6	2	6
(Russia) Vitalia Diatchenko	2	6	3
(Russia) Natalia Vikhlyantseva	6	6
WC	(Russia) Daria Mishina	1	2
WC	(Russia) Oksana Selekhmeteva	6	4	5
(Poland) Magdalena Fręch	4	6	7
(Czech Republic) Tereza Martincová	3	6	6
7	(Spain) Lara Arruabarrena	6	1	4

Second round
4	(Germany) Andrea Petkovic	4	4
(Russia) Natalia Vikhlyantseva	6	6
(Poland) Magdalena Fręch	3	2
(Czech Republic) Tereza Martincová	6	6

Qualifying competition
(Russia) Natalia Vikhlyantseva	4	1
(Czech Republic) Tereza Martincová	6	6
