= 2019 St. Petersburg Ladies' Trophy =

- Date: 28 January – 3 February
- Edition: 10th
- Category: WTA Premier
- Prize money: $823,000
- Surface: Hard (indoor)
- Location: Saint Petersburg, Russia
- Venue: Sibur Arena

Champions

Singles
- (Netherlands) Kiki Bertens

Doubles
- (Russia) Margarita Gasparyan / (Russia) Ekaterina Makarova
- St. Petersburg Ladies' Trophy

The 2019 St. Petersburg Ladies' Trophy was a professional tennis tournament played on indoor hard courts. It was the 10th edition of the tournament and fourth time as a WTA Premier tournament. It was part of the 2019 WTA Tour and was held between 28 January and 3 February 2019.

== Point distribution ==
Event	W	F	SF	QF	Round of 16	Round of 32	Q	Q3	Q2	Q1
Singles	470	305	185	100	55	1	25	18	13	1
Doubles	470	305	185	100	1	—N/a	—N/a	—N/a	—N/a	—N/a

== Prize money ==
Event	W	F	SF	QF	Round of 16	Round of 32^{1}	Q3	Q2	Q1
Singles	$141,500	$75,555	$40,360	$21,700	$11,640	$7,385	$3,325	$1,770	$980
Doubles*	$44,200	$23,615	$12,905	$6,565	$3,570	—N/a	—N/a	—N/a	—N/a

_{^{1}Qualifiers prize money is also the Round of 32 prize money.}
_{*per team}

== Singles main draw entrants ==
=== Seeds ===
Country	Player	Rank^{1}	Seed
CZE	Petra Kvitová	6	1
NED	Kiki Bertens	9	2
RUS	Daria Kasatkina	10	3
BLR	Aryna Sabalenka	11	4
GER	Julia Görges	13	5
LAT	Jeļena Ostapenko	22	6
~~SVK~~	~~Dominika Cibulková~~	~~25~~	~~7~~
CRO	Donna Vekić	29	8

- ^{1} Rankings as of January 14, 2019.

=== Other entrants ===
The following players received wildcards into the singles main draw:

- (Belarus) Victoria Azarenka
- (Serbia) Olga Danilović
- (Russia) Ekaterina Makarova
- (Russia) Vera Zvonareva

The following player received entry using a protected ranking into the singles main draw:

- (Switzerland) Timea Bacsinszky

The following players received entry from the qualifying draw:

- (Russia) Ekaterina Alexandrova
- (Belgium) Ysaline Bonaventure
- (Russia) Margarita Gasparyan
- (Czech Republic) Tereza Martincová

The following players received entry as lucky losers:

- (United Kingdom) Katie Boulter
- (Russia) Veronika Kudermetova

=== Withdrawals ===
Before the tournament

- (Slovakia) Dominika Cibulková → replaced by (United Kingdom) Katie Boulter
- (Italy) Camila Giorgi → replaced by (Russia) Veronika Kudermetova
- (Belarus) Aliaksandra Sasnovich → replaced by (Belgium) Kirsten Flipkens
- (Spain) Carla Suárez Navarro → replaced by (Belgium) Alison Van Uytvanck

During the tournament

- (Russia) Maria Sharapova (right shoulder injury)

== Doubles main draw entrants ==
=== Seeds ===
Country	Player	Country	Player	Rank^{1}	Seed
USA	Raquel Atawo	SLO	Katarina Srebotnik	51	1
FRA	Kristina Mladenovic	KAZ	Galina Voskoboeva	68	2
JPN	Shuko Aoyama	BLR	Lidziya Marozava	83	3
SUI	Timea Bacsinszky	RUS	Vera Zvonareva	121	4

- ^{1} Rankings as of January 14, 2019.

=== Other entrants ===
The following pair received a wildcard into the doubles main draw:

- (Russia) Daria Mishina / (Russia) Ekaterina Shalimova

== Champions ==
=== Singles ===
- (Netherlands) Kiki Bertens def. (Croatia) Donna Vekić, 7–6^{(7–2)}, 6–4

=== Doubles ===
- (Russia) Margarita Gasparyan / (Russia) Ekaterina Makarova def. (Russia) Anna Kalinskaya / (Slovakia) Viktória Kužmová, 7–5, 7–5
