= 2016 St. Petersburg Ladies' Trophy – Doubles =

Doubles
- 2016 St. Petersburg Ladies' Trophy

Final
- Champions: (Switzerland) Martina Hingis (India) Sania Mirza
- Runners-up: (Russia) Vera Dushevina (Czech Republic) Barbora Krejčíková
- Score: 6–3, 6–1

Events
Singles	Doubles
← 2015 ·	St. Petersburg Ladies' Trophy	· 2017 →

Viktorija Golubic and Aliaksandra Sasnovich were the defending champions, but chose not to participate this year.
Martina Hingis and Sania Mirza won the title, defeating Vera Dushevina and Barbora Krejčíková in the final, 6–3, 6–1.

== Seeds ==
1. (Switzerland) Martina Hingis / (India) Sania Mirza (champions)
2. (Czech Republic) Andrea Hlaváčková / (Czech Republic) Lucie Hradecká (semifinals)
3. (Spain) Anabel Medina Garrigues / (Spain) Arantxa Parra Santonja (semifinals)
4. (Romania) Monica Niculescu / (Germany) Laura Siegemund (quarterfinals, retired)

== Draw ==
=== Key ===
- Q = Qualifier
- WC = Wild card
- LL = Lucky loser
- Alt = Alternate
- SE = Special exempt
- PR = Protected ranking
- ITF = ITF entry
- JE = Junior exempt
- w/o = Walkover
- r = Retired
- d = Defaulted
- SR = Special ranking

First round
1	(Switzerland) M Hingis (India) S Mirza	7	7
(Latvia) J Ostapenko (Russia) E Rodina	5	5
(Russia) D Kasatkina (Russia) E Vesnina	6	6
WC	(Russia) A Bukhanko (Slovakia) D Cibulková	0	1
3	(Spain) A Medina Garrigues (Spain) A Parra Santonja	6	6
(Russia) I Khromacheva (Belgium) E Mertens	0	2
(Romania) E Bogdan (Belarus) I Kremen	6	5	[12]
(Croatia) D Jurak (United States) N Melichar	3	7	[10]
(Russia) V Solovyeva (Ukraine) M Zanevska	1	6	[4]
(Russia) V Dushevina (Czech Republic) B Krejčíková	6	4	[10]
(Romania) R Olaru (Romania) PM Țig	3	2
4	(Romania) M Niculescu (Germany) L Siegemund	6	6
(Russia) A Panova (Ukraine) O Savchuk	6	1	[11]
(Russia) V Ivakhnenko (Belarus) L Marozava	3	6	[13]
(Switzerland) X Knoll (Netherlands) D Schuurs	4	6^{5}
2	(Czech Republic) A Hlaváčková (Czech Republic) L Hradecká	6	7^{7}

Quarterfinals
1	(Switzerland) M Hingis (India) S Mirza	6	6
(Russia) D Kasatkina (Russia) E Vesnina	4	1
3	(Spain) A Medina Garrigues (Spain) A Parra Santonja	7	6
(Romania) E Bogdan (Belarus) I Kremen	5	2
(Russia) V Dushevina (Czech Republic) B Krejčíková	4
4	(Romania) M Niculescu (Germany) L Siegemund	3^{r}
(Russia) V Ivakhnenko (Belarus) L Marozava	1	4
2	(Czech Republic) A Hlaváčková (Czech Republic) L Hradecká	6	6

Semifinals
1	(Switzerland) M Hingis (India) S Mirza	7	6^{6}	[10]
3	(Spain) A Medina Garrigues (Spain) A Parra Santonja	5	7^{8}	[6]
(Russia) V Dushevina (Czech Republic) B Krejčíková	3	7^{7}	[10]
2	(Czech Republic) A Hlaváčková (Czech Republic) L Hradecká	6	6^{5}	[8]

Final
1	(Switzerland) M Hingis (India) S Mirza	6	6
(Russia) V Dushevina (Czech Republic) B Krejčíková	3	1
