= 2016 St. Petersburg Ladies' Trophy – Singles =

Singles
- 2016 St. Petersburg Ladies' Trophy

Final
- Champion: (Italy) Roberta Vinci
- Runner-up: (Switzerland) Belinda Bencic
- Score: 6–4, 6–3

Details
- Draw: 24 (4 Q / 2 WC )
- Seeds: 9

Events
Singles	Doubles
- St. Petersburg Ladies' Trophy

Jeļena Ostapenko was the defending champion from when the tournament was an ITF Women's Circuit event under a different name, but lost in the first round to Yanina Wickmayer.

Second-seeded Roberta Vinci won the title, defeating Belinda Bencic in the final, 6–4, 6–3. It was her 10th WTA Tour singles title.

Both finalists entered the top-10 of WTA rankings for the first time at the conclusion of the tournament.

== Seeds ==
The top four seeds received a bye into the second round.

1. (Switzerland) Belinda Bencic (final)
2. (Italy) Roberta Vinci (champion)
3. (Denmark) Caroline Wozniacki (second round)
4. (Serbia) Ana Ivanovic (semifinals)
5. (Russia) Anastasia Pavlyuchenkova (quarterfinals)
6. (Slovakia) Anna Karolína Schmiedlová (withdrew due to an ankle sprain)
7. (France) Kristina Mladenovic (first round)
8. (France) Alizé Cornet (withdrew due to a lower back injury)
9. (Romania) Monica Niculescu (second round)

== Draw ==
Key

- Q = Qualifier
- WC = Wild card
- LL = Lucky loser
- Alt = Alternate
- ITF = ITF entry
- PR = Protected ranking
- SR = Special ranking
- SE = Special exempt
- JE = Junior exempt
- JR = Junior Accelerator Programme entrant
- CO = College Accelerator Programme entrant
- NG = Next Gen Accelerator Program entrant
- w/o = Walkover
- r = Retired
- d = Defaulted

=== Finals ===
Semifinals
1	(Switzerland) Belinda Bencic	6	6
(Russia) Daria Kasatkina	4	3
4	(Serbia) Ana Ivanovic	5	4
2	(Italy) Roberta Vinci	7	6

Final
1	(Switzerland) Belinda Bencic	4	3
2	(Italy) Roberta Vinci	6	6

=== Top half ===
First round
(Germany) A Beck	4	6	7
(Czech Republic) L Hradecká	6	4	5
(Germany) C Witthöft	6	6
Q	(Austria) T Paszek	3	3
Q	(Czech Republic) K Koukalová	4	6	4
5	(Russia) A Pavlyuchenkova	6	4	6
(Slovakia) D Cibulková	6	6
(Russia) E Rodina	3	0
(Belgium) K Flipkens	4	7	4
(Russia) D Kasatkina	6	5	6
LL	(Germany) L Siegemund	1	7	6
7	(France) K Mladenovic	6	5	1

Second round
1	(Switzerland) B Bencic	7^{7}	6
(Germany) A Beck	6^{3}	3
(Germany) C Witthöft	1	5
5	(Russia) A Pavlyuchenkova	6	7
3/WC	(Denmark) C Wozniacki	4	5
(Slovakia) D Cibulková	6	7
(Russia) D Kasatkina	6	6
LL	(Germany) L Siegemund	3	4

Quarterfinals
1	(Switzerland) B Bencic	6^{4}	6	6
5	(Russia) A Pavlyuchenkova	7^{7}	4	2
(Slovakia) D Cibulková	6	5	3
(Russia) D Kasatkina	4	7	6

Semifinals
1	(Switzerland) B Bencic	6	6
(Russia) D Kasatkina	4	3

=== Bottom half ===
First round
LL	(Romania) PM Tig	6	3	1
WC	(Russia) E Vesnina	3	6	6
(Czech Republic) B Strýcová	3	4
Q	(Ukraine) K Kozlova	6	6
(Russia) M Gasparyan	6	6
(Serbia) B Jovanovski	1	2
9	(Romania) M Niculescu	6	6
WC	(Russia) N Vikhlyantseva	0	3
Q	(Czech Republic) K Siniaková	6^{0}	5
(Hungary) T Babos	7^{7}	7
(Latvia) J Ostapenko	4	3
(Belgium) Y Wickmayer	6	6

Second round
WC	(Russia) E Vesnina	6	3	2
Q	(Ukraine) K Kozlova	2	6	6
(Russia) M Gasparyan	5	2
4	(Serbia) A Ivanovic	7	6
9	(Romania) M Niculescu	6	1	3
(Hungary) T Babos	4	6	6
(Belgium) Y Wickmayer	2	6^{2}
2	(Italy) R Vinci	6	7^{7}

Quarterfinals
Q	(Ukraine) K Kozlova	1	5
4	(Serbia) A Ivanovic	6	7
(Hungary) T Babos	6^{3}	6	6^{4}
2	(Italy) R Vinci	7^{7}	4	7^{7}

Semifinals
4	(Serbia) A Ivanovic	5	4
2	(Italy) R Vinci	7	6

== Qualifying ==
=== Seeds ===
1. (Germany) Laura Siegemund (qualifying competition, lucky loser)
2. (Czech Republic) Kateřina Siniaková (qualified)
3. (Czech Republic) Klára Koukalová (qualified)
4. (Bulgaria) Sesil Karatantcheva (qualifying competition)
5. (Romania) Patricia Maria Tig (qualifying competition, lucky loser)
6. (Austria) Tamira Paszek (qualified)
7. (Ukraine) Maryna Zanevska (second round)
8. (Japan) Misa Eguchi (first round)

=== Qualifiers ===
1. (Ukraine) Kateryna Kozlova
2. (Czech Republic) Kateřina Siniaková
3. (Czech Republic) Klára Koukalová
4. (Austria) Tamira Paszek

=== Lucky losers ===
1. (Germany) Laura Siegemund
2. (Romania) Patricia Maria Tig

=== Draw ===
==== First qualifier ====
First round
1	(Germany) Laura Siegemund	6	6
(Russia) Anastasiya Komardina	4	1
(Czech Republic) Tereza Martincová	5	6	6
(Czech Republic) Barbora Krejčíková	7	3	3
(Russia) Vera Dushevina	1	1
(Ukraine) Kateryna Kozlova	6	6
WC	(Moldova) Anastasia Dețiuc	1	6	1
7	(Ukraine) Maryna Zanevska	6	2	6

Second round
1	(Germany) Laura Siegemund	6	3	6
(Czech Republic) Tereza Martincová	2	6	3
(Ukraine) Kateryna Kozlova	6	0	7^{7}
7	(Ukraine) Maryna Zanevska	4	6	6^{5}

Qualifying competition
1	(Germany) Laura Siegemund	4	0
(Ukraine) Kateryna Kozlova	6	6

==== Second qualifier ====
First round
2	(Czech Republic) Kateřina Siniaková	4	6	6
WC	(Russia) Anna Kalinskaya	6	3	2
(Czech Republic) Andrea Hlaváčková	4	4
(Russia) Valentyna Ivakhnenko	6	6
(Russia) Alexandra Panova	6	6
(Russia) Polina Vinogradova	2	1
(Russia) Ksenia Lykina	7	6
8	(Japan) Misa Eguchi	5	3

Second round
2	(Czech Republic) Kateřina Siniaková	6	6
(Russia) Valentyna Ivakhnenko	4	2
(Russia) Alexandra Panova	6	7
(Russia) Ksenia Lykina	3	5

Qualifying competition
2	(Czech Republic) Kateřina Siniaková	6	6
(Russia) Alexandra Panova	3	3

==== Third qualifier ====
First round
3	(Czech Republic) Klára Koukalová	4	6	6
(Belarus) Ilona Kremen	6	1	2
(Russia) Irina Khromacheva	6	4	4
(Belgium) Elise Mertens	4	6	6
(Netherlands) Lesley Kerkhove	6	6
WC	(Russia) Anastasia Bukhanko	1	1
(Russia) Ekaterina Bychkova	0	3
5	(Romania) Patricia Maria Tig	6	6

Second round
3	(Czech Republic) Klára Koukalová	6	7
(Belgium) Elise Mertens	3	5
(Netherlands) Lesley Kerkhove	6^{4}	3
5	(Romania) Patricia Maria Tig	7^{7}	6

Qualifying competition
3	(Czech Republic) Klára Koukalová	6	6
5	(Romania) Patricia Maria Tig	4	3

==== Fourth qualifier ====
First round
4	(Bulgaria) Sesil Karatantcheva	6	6
WC	(Russia) Valeriya Pogrebnyak	0	0
(Czech Republic) Kateřina Vaňková	2	6	0
(Russia) Polina Leykina	6	2	6
(Poland) Katarzyna Kawa	6	6
(Ukraine) Valeriya Strakhova	1	2
(Russia) Natela Dzalamidze	1	2
6	(Austria) Tamira Paszek	6	6

Second round
4	(Bulgaria) Sesil Karatantcheva	7^{7}	6
(Russia) Polina Leykina	6^{4}	4
(Poland) Katarzyna Kawa	6	1	2
6	(Austria) Tamira Paszek	1	6	6

Qualifying competition
4	(Bulgaria) Sesil Karatantcheva	6^{3}	4
6	(Austria) Tamira Paszek	7^{7}	6
