= 2017 St. Petersburg Ladies' Trophy =

- Date: 30 January – 5 February
- Edition: 8th
- Category: WTA Premier
- Prize money: $776,000
- Surface: Hard (indoor)
- Location: Saint Petersburg, Russia
- Venue: Sibur Arena

Champions

Singles
- (France) Kristina Mladenovic

Doubles
- (Latvia) Jeļena Ostapenko / (Poland) Alicja Rosolska
- St. Petersburg Ladies' Trophy

The 2017 St. Petersburg Ladies' Trophy was a professional tennis tournament played on indoor hard courts. It was the eighth edition of the tournament and second time as a WTA Premier tournament. It was part of the 2017 WTA Tour and was held between 30 January and 5 February 2017. Unseeded Kristina Mladenovic won the singles title.

== Finals ==
=== Singles ===
- (France) Kristina Mladenovic defeated (Kazakhstan) Yulia Putintseva, 6–2, 6–7^{(3–7)}, 6–4

=== Doubles ===
- (Latvia) Jeļena Ostapenko / (Poland) Alicja Rosolska defeated (Croatia) Darija Jurak / (Switzerland) Xenia Knoll, 3–6, 6–2, [10–5]

== Point distribution ==
Event	W	F	SF	QF	Round of 16	Round of 32	Q	Q3	Q2	Q1
Singles	470	305	185	100	55	1	25	18	13	1
Doubles	470	305	185	100	1	—N/a	—N/a	—N/a	—N/a	—N/a

== Prize money ==
Event	W	F	SF	QF	Round of 16	Round of 32^{1}	Q3	Q2	Q1
Singles	$132,740	$70,880	$37,850	$20,350	$10,915	$6,925	$3,110	$1,650	$920
Doubles*	$41,520	$22,180	$12,120	$6,165	$3,350	—N/a	—N/a	—N/a	—N/a

_{^{1}Qualifiers prize money is also the Round of 32 prize money.}
_{*per team}

== Singles main draw entrants ==
=== Seeds ===
Country	Player	Rank^{1}	Seed
ROU	Simona Halep	4	1
SVK	Dominika Cibulková	6	2
RUS	Svetlana Kuznetsova	10	3
USA	Venus Williams	17	4
RUS	Elena Vesnina	18	5
ITA	Roberta Vinci	19	6
NED	Kiki Bertens	22	7
RUS	Daria Kasatkina	25	8

- ^{1} Rankings as of January 16, 2017.

=== Other entrants ===
The following players received wildcards into the singles main draw:

- (Russia) Anna Kalinskaya
- (Russia) Natalia Vikhlyantseva

The following players received entry from the qualifying draw:

- (Belgium) Kirsten Flipkens
- (Belgium) Elise Mertens
- (Germany) Andrea Petkovic
- (Switzerland) Stefanie Vögele

The following player received entry as a lucky loser:

- (Croatia) Donna Vekić

=== Withdrawals ===
Before the tournament

- (Czech Republic) Barbora Strýcová → replaced by (Croatia) Ana Konjuh
- (Switzerland) Stefanie Vögele → replaced by (Croatia) Donna Vekić

=== Retirements ===
- (Sweden) Johanna Larsson (Left hip injury)

== Doubles main draw entrants ==
=== Seeds ===
Country	Player	Country	Player	Rank^{1}	Seed
~~NED~~	~~Kiki Bertens~~	~~SWE~~	~~Johanna Larsson~~	~~53~~	~~1~~
CRO	Darija Jurak	SUI	Xenia Knoll	88	2
AUS	Daria Gavrilova	FRA	Kristina Mladenovic	89	3
ROU	Raluca Olaru	UKR	Olga Savchuk	112	4

- ^{1} Rankings as of January 16, 2017.

=== Other entrants ===
The following pair received a wildcard into the doubles main draw:

- (Russia) Anastasia Bukhanko / (Croatia) Ana Konjuh

The following pairs received entry as alternates:

- (Bulgaria) Isabella Shinikova / (Ukraine) Valeriya Strakhova

=== Withdrawals ===
Before the tournament

- (Sweden) Johanna Larsson (Left hip injury)
