= 2017 St. Petersburg Ladies' Trophy – Doubles =

Doubles
- 2017 St. Petersburg Ladies' Trophy

Final
- Champions: (Latvia) Jeļena Ostapenko (Poland) Alicja Rosolska
- Runners-up: (Croatia) Darija Jurak (Switzerland) Xenia Knoll
- Score: 3–6, 6–2, [10–5]

Details
- Draw: 16
- Seeds: 4

Events
Singles	Doubles
- St. Petersburg Ladies' Trophy

Martina Hingis and Sania Mirza were the defending champions, but Mirza chose not to participate this year. Hingis played alongside Belinda Bencic, but lost in the first round to Gabriela Dabrowski and Michaëlla Krajicek.

Jeļena Ostapenko and Alicja Rosolska won the title, defeating Darija Jurak and Xenia Knoll in the final, 3–6, 6–2, [10–5].

== Seeds ==
1. (Netherlands) Kiki Bertens / (Sweden) Johanna Larsson (withdrew)
2. (Croatia) Darija Jurak / (Switzerland) Xenia Knoll (final)
3. (Australia) Daria Gavrilova / (France) Kristina Mladenovic (semifinals)
4. (Romania) Raluca Olaru / (Ukraine) Olga Savchuk (first round)

== Draw ==
Key

- Q = Qualifier
- WC = Wild card
- LL = Lucky loser
- Alt = Alternate
- ITF = ITF entry
- PR = Protected ranking
- SR = Special ranking
- SE = Special exempt
- JE = Junior exempt
- JR = Junior Accelerator Programme entrant
- CO = College Accelerator Programme entrant
- NG = Next Gen Accelerator Program entrant
- w/o = Walkover
- r = Retired
- d = Defaulted

First round
Alt	(Bulgaria) I Shinikova (Ukraine) V Strakhova	7^{7}	2	[3]
(Russia) V Kudermetova (Russia) K Lykina	6^{5}	6	[10]
(Canada) G Dabrowski (Netherlands) M Krajicek	6	4	[10]
(Switzerland) B Bencic (Switzerland) M Hingis	4	6	[3]
4	(Romania) R Olaru (Ukraine) O Savchuk	2	4
(Latvia) J Ostapenko (Poland) A Rosolska	6	6
WC	(Russia) A Bukhanko (Croatia) A Konjuh	2	2
(Russia) A Kalinskaya (Russia) I Khromacheva	6	6
(Romania) I-C Begu (Romania) M Niculescu	6	6
(Czech Republic) L Kunčíková (Belgium) E Mertens	1	3
(Netherlands) D Schuurs (Czech Republic) R Voráčová	3	4
3	(Australia) D Gavrilova (France) K Mladenovic	6	6
(Netherlands) L Kerkhove (Belarus) L Marozava	6	6
(Belgium) K Flipkens (Croatia) D Vekić	2	3
(Ukraine) L Kichenok (Ukraine) N Kichenok	3	6	[6]
2	(Croatia) D Jurak (Switzerland) X Knoll	6	4	[10]

Quarterfinals
(Russia) V Kudermetova (Russia) K Lykina	1	3
(Canada) G Dabrowski (Netherlands) M Krajicek	6	6
(Latvia) J Ostapenko (Poland) A Rosolska	6	5	[10]
(Russia) A Kalinskaya (Russia) I Khromacheva	1	7	[8]
(Romania) I-C Begu (Romania) M Niculescu	3	2
3	(Australia) D Gavrilova (France) K Mladenovic	6	6
(Netherlands) L Kerkhove (Belarus) L Marozava	4	7^{9}	[9]
2	(Croatia) D Jurak (Switzerland) X Knoll	6	6^{7}	[11]

Semifinals
(Canada) G Dabrowski (Netherlands) M Krajicek	6	3	[8]
(Latvia) J Ostapenko (Poland) A Rosolska	3	6	[10]
3	(Australia) D Gavrilova (France) K Mladenovic	3	4
2	(Croatia) D Jurak (Switzerland) X Knoll	6	6

Final
(Latvia) J Ostapenko (Poland) A Rosolska	3	6	[10]
2	(Croatia) D Jurak (Switzerland) X Knoll	6	2	[5]
