= 2017 St. Petersburg Ladies' Trophy – Singles =

Singles
- 2017 St. Petersburg Ladies' Trophy

Final
- Champion: (France) Kristina Mladenovic
- Runner-up: (Kazakhstan) Yulia Putintseva
- Score: 6–2, 6–7^{(3–7)}, 6–4

Details
- Draw: 24 (4 Q / 2 WC )
- Seeds: 8

Events
Singles	Doubles
- St. Petersburg Ladies' Trophy

Roberta Vinci was the defending champion, but lost in the quarterfinals to unseeded Kristina Mladenovic.

Mladenovic went on to win the title, defeating Yulia Putintseva in the final, 6–2, 6–7^{(3–7)}, 6–4. It was her first WTA Tour singles title.

== Seeds ==
The top four seeds received a bye into the second round.

1. (Romania) Simona Halep (quarterfinals, withdrew)
2. (Slovakia) Dominika Cibulková (semifinals)
3. (Russia) Svetlana Kuznetsova (quarterfinals)
4. (United States) Venus Williams (second round)
5. (Russia) Elena Vesnina (quarterfinals)
6. (Italy) Roberta Vinci (quarterfinals)
7. (Netherlands) Kiki Bertens (first round)
8. (Russia) Daria Kasatkina (second round)

== Draw ==
Key

- Q = Qualifier
- WC = Wild card
- LL = Lucky loser
- Alt = Alternate
- ITF = ITF entry
- PR = Protected ranking
- SR = Special ranking
- SE = Special exempt
- JE = Junior exempt
- JR = Junior Accelerator Programme entrant
- CO = College Accelerator Programme entrant
- NG = Next Gen Accelerator Program entrant
- w/o = Walkover
- r = Retired
- d = Defaulted

=== Finals ===
Semifinals
WC	(Russia) Natalia Vikhlyantseva	6	2	2
(France) Kristina Mladenovic	4	6	6
(Kazakhstan) Yulia Putintseva	3	6	6
2	(Slovakia) Dominika Cibulková	6	4	4

Final
(France) Kristina Mladenovic	6	6^{3}	6
(Kazakhstan) Yulia Putintseva	2	7^{7}	4

=== Top half ===
First round
(Croatia) A Konjuh	1	6	6
(Romania) M Niculescu	6	3	2
(Kazakhstan) Y Shvedova	3	4
WC	(Russia) N Vikhlyantseva	6	6
(Switzerland) B Bencic	2	5
8	(Russia) D Kasatkina	6	7
Q	(Belgium) E Mertens	6^{5}	4
(France) K Mladenovic	7^{7}	6
Q	(Germany) A Petkovic	6	7
(Romania) I-C Begu	1	5
(Hungary) T Babos	3	6	4
6	(Italy) R Vinci	6	3	6

Second round
1	(Romania) S Halep	6	7^{7}
(Croatia) A Konjuh	4	6^{2}
WC	(Russia) N Vikhlyantseva	7^{7}	6
8	(Russia) D Kasatkina	6^{4}	2
4	(United States) V Williams	3	1
(France) K Mladenovic	6	6
Q	(Germany) A Petkovic	4	4
6	(Italy) R Vinci	6	6

Quarterfinals
1	(Romania) S Halep
WC	(Russia) N Vikhlyantseva	w/o
(France) K Mladenovic	6	6
6	(Italy) R Vinci	1	4

Semifinals
WC	(Russia) N Vikhlyantseva	6	2	2
(France) K Mladenovic	4	6	6

=== Bottom half ===
First round
7	(Netherlands) K Bertens	5	6	4
(Germany) A Beck	7	3	6
(Kazakhstan) Y Putintseva	6	1
(Sweden) J Larsson	0	0^{r}
WC	(Russia) A Kalinskaya	4	5
(Australia) D Gavrilova	6	7
5	(Russia) E Vesnina	6	6
(Russia) E Makarova	3	1
Q	(Belgium) K Flipkens	4	2
(France) A Cornet	6	6
(Latvia) J Ostapenko	0	4
LL	(Croatia) D Vekić	6	6

Second round
(Germany) A Beck	4	0
(Kazakhstan) Y Putintseva	6	6
(Australia) D Gavrilova	1	3
3	(Russia) S Kuznetsova	6	6
5	(Russia) E Vesnina	2	6	6
(France) A Cornet	6	3	3
LL	(Croatia) D Vekić	2	2
2	(Slovakia) D Cibulková	6	6

Quarterfinals
(Kazakhstan) Y Putintseva	6	6^{4}	7
3	(Russia) S Kuznetsova	3	7^{7}	5
5	(Russia) E Vesnina	3	3
2	(Slovakia) D Cibulková	6	6

Semifinals
(Kazakhstan) Y Putintseva	3	6	6
2	(Slovakia) D Cibulková	6	4	4

== Qualifying ==
=== Seeds ===
1. (Germany) Andrea Petkovic (qualified)
2. (Belgium) Kirsten Flipkens (qualified)
3. (Italy) Camila Giorgi (withdrew due to a lower back injury)
4. (Belgium) Elise Mertens (qualified)
5. (Czech Republic) Denisa Allertová (second round)
6. (Russia) Irina Khromacheva (first round)
7. (Croatia) Donna Vekić (qualifying competition, lucky loser)
8. (Romania) Patricia Maria Țig (first round, retired)
9. (Russia) Ekaterina Alexandrova (second round)

=== Qualifiers ===
1. (Germany) Andrea Petkovic
2. (Belgium) Kirsten Flipkens
3. (Switzerland) Stefanie Vögele (withdrew)
4. (Belgium) Elise Mertens

=== Lucky losers ===
1. (Croatia) Donna Vekić

=== Draw ===
==== First qualifier ====
First round
1	(Germany) Andrea Petkovic	7^{7}	6
(Netherlands) Lesley Kerkhove	6^{3}	1
WC	(Russia) Valeriya Pogrebnyak	0	3
(Austria) Barbara Haas	6	6
(Russia) Ksenia Lykina	1	3
(Russia) Anastasiya Komardina	6	6
(Uzbekistan) Sabina Sharipova	6	4
8	(Romania) Patricia Maria Țig	2	1^{r}

Second round
1	(Germany) Andrea Petkovic	6	6
(Austria) Barbara Haas	3	4
(Russia) Anastasiya Komardina	6	6
(Uzbekistan) Sabina Sharipova	3	4

Qualifying competition
1	(Germany) Andrea Petkovic	6	6
(Russia) Anastasiya Komardina	2	3

==== Second qualifier ====
First round
2	(Belgium) Kirsten Flipkens	6	6
(Bulgaria) Viktoriya Tomova	1	2
(Brazil) Paula Cristina Gonçalves	6	6
(Russia) Veronika Kudermetova	3	4
(Netherlands) Cindy Burger	6	2	6^{3}
(Russia) Viktoria Kamenskaya	2	6	7^{7}
(Belarus) Aryna Sabalenka	4	2
7	(Croatia) Donna Vekić	6	6

Second round
2	(Belgium) Kirsten Flipkens	3	6	6
(Brazil) Paula Cristina Gonçalves	6	2	0
(Russia) Viktoria Kamenskaya	2	1
7	(Croatia) Donna Vekić	6	6

Qualifying competition
2	(Belgium) Kirsten Flipkens	6	5	7
7	(Croatia) Donna Vekić	4	7	5

==== Third qualifier ====
First round
9	(Russia) Ekaterina Alexandrova	6	7
(Belarus) Aliaksandra Sasnovich	4	5
(Bulgaria) Isabella Shinikova	5	6	6^{5}
(Bulgaria) Elitsa Kostova	7	2	7^{7}
WC	(Ukraine) Valeriya Strakhova	0	2
(Switzerland) Stefanie Vögele	6	6
WC	(Croatia) Tena Lukas	6	6^{1}	5
5	(Czech Republic) Denisa Allertová	2	7^{7}	7

Second round
9	(Russia) Ekaterina Alexandrova	5	1
(Bulgaria) Elitsa Kostova	7	6
(Switzerland) Stefanie Vögele	7	6
5	(Czech Republic) Denisa Allertová	5	2

Qualifying competition
(Bulgaria) Elitsa Kostova	3	4
(Switzerland) Stefanie Vögele	6	6

==== Fourth qualifier ====
First round
4	(Belgium) Elise Mertens	6	6
(Spain) Sílvia Soler Espinosa	4	0
WC	(Russia) Olesya Pervushina	2	4
(Czech Republic) Tereza Martincová	6	6
PR	(Netherlands) Michaëlla Krajicek	1	2
(Belgium) Maryna Zanevska	6	6
Alt	(Canada) Gabriela Dabrowski	4	6	6
6	(Russia) Irina Khromacheva	6	3	2

Second round
4	(Belgium) Elise Mertens	4	6	5
(Czech Republic) Tereza Martincová	6	4	5^{d}
(Belgium) Maryna Zanevska	7^{8}	7^{9}
Alt	(Canada) Gabriela Dabrowski	6^{6}	6^{7}

Qualifying competition
4	(Belgium) Elise Mertens	6	2	6
(Belgium) Maryna Zanevska	2	6	4
