= Daria Mishina =

Russian tennis player (born 1993)

Daria Mishina Дарья Мишина
- Full name: Daria Vladimirovna Mishina
- Country (sports): Russia
- Born: 9 April 1993 (age 33)
- Plays: Right-handed (two-handed backhand)
- Prize money: US$ 96,228

Singles
- Career record: 237–152
- Career titles: 7 ITF
- Highest ranking: No. 319 (23 September 2013)

Doubles
- Career record: 102–81
- Career titles: 11 ITF
- Highest ranking: No. 270 (6 January 2020)

Daria Vladimirovna Mishina (Russian: Дарья Владимировна Мишина; née Mironova, born 9 April 1993) is a Russian former tennis player.

She achieved career-high WTA rankings of 319 in singles and 270 in doubles.

Mishina made her WTA Tour main-draw debut at the 2019 St. Petersburg Trophy, in the doubles tournament, partnering Ekaterina Shalimova. She made her WTA Tour singles debut as a wildcard entrant at the 2021 St. Petersburg Trophy, where she lost in the first round to Kamilla Rakhimova.

== ITF Circuit finals ==
=== Singles: 12 (7 titles, 5 runner–ups) ===
Legend $25,000 tournaments $15,000 tournaments $10,000 tournaments	Finals by surface Hard (3–1) Clay (4–4)

Result	W–L	Date	Tournament	Tier	Surface	Opponent	Score
Loss	0–1	Jul 2011	ITF İzmir, Turkey	10,000	Clay	(Bulgaria) Aleksandrina Naydenova	4–6, 3–6
Win	1–1	Mar 2013	ITF Sharm El Sheikh, Egypt	10,000	Hard	(United Kingdom) Naomi Broady	7–6^{(2)}, 2–6, 7–6^{(4)}
Loss	1–2	Aug 2013	ITF Moscow, Russia	25,000	Clay	(Ukraine) Anastasiya Vasylyeva	2–6, 3–6
Win	2–2	Jun 2015	Kazan Open, Russia	10,000	Hard	(Russia) Anastasia Frolova	5–7, 6–0, 7–6^{(5)}
Win	3–2	Aug 2015	ITF Savitaipale, Finland	10,000	Clay	(Bosnia and Herzegovina) Dea Herdželaš	6–4, 4–6, 6–4
Win	4–2	Aug 2018	Tatarstan Open, Russia	15,000	Clay	(Russia) Valeriya Yushchenko	6–3, 6–1
Win	5–2	Aug 2018	Kremlin Cup Kazan, Russia	15,000	Clay	(Russia) Ekaterina Kazionova	6–1, 6–2
Loss	5–3	Sep 2018	ITF Moscow, Russia	15,000	Clay	(Russia) Vlada Koval	2–6, 6–7^{(6)}
Win	6–3	Dec 2018	ITF Antalya, Turkey	15,000	Hard	(Russia) Ekaterina Vishnevskaya	6–3, 6–1
Loss	6–4	Sep 2019	ITF Ceuta, Spain	15,000	Hard	(Russia) Ekaterina Shalimova	4–6, 6–1, 1–6
Loss	6–5	Nov 2020	ITF Cairo, Egypt	15,000	Clay	(Brazil) Carolina Alves	5–7, 4–6
Win	7–5	Sep 2021	ITF Varna, Bulgaria	15,000	Clay	(Bulgaria) Julia Terziyska	6–4, 6–4

=== Doubles: 16 (11 titles, 5 runner–ups) ===
Legend $25,000 tournaments $15,000 tournaments $10,000 tournaments	Finals by surface Hard (5–3) Clay (6–2)

Result	W–L	Date	Tournament	Tier	Surface	Partner	Opponents	Score
Win	1–0	Nov 2015	ITF Helsinki, Finland	10,000	Hard (i)	(Russia) Daria Lodikova	(Belgium) Magali Kempen (Netherlands) Kelly Versteeg	3–6, 6–2, [10–5]
Loss	1–1	Aug 2018	Tatarstan Open, Russia	15,000	Clay	(Russia) Noel Saidenova	(Russia) Maria Krupenina (Russia) Anastasia Tikhonova	4–6, 6–3, [8–10]
Win	2–1	Dec 2018	ITF Antalya, Turkey	15,000	Hard	(Russia) Anastasia Sukhotina	(Russia) Ekaterina Vishnevskaya (Russia) Angelina Zhuravleva	7–6^{(4)}, 6–2
Win	3–1	Mar 2019	ITF Antalya, Turkey	15,000	Clay	(Kyrgyzstan) Ksenia Palkina	(Romania) Cristina Dinu (North Macedonia) Lina Gjorcheska	6–3, 3–6, [12–10]
Win	4–1	Jun 2019	ITF Gimcheon, South Korea	15,000	Clay	(Japan) Ayumi Koshiishi	(Japan) Kanako Morisaki (Japan) Ayaka Okuno	6–3, 6–2
Win	5–1	Jul 2019	ITF Denain, France	25,000	Clay	(China) Xu Shilin	(Chile) Bárbara Gatica (Brazil) Rebeca Pereira	6–0, 7–5
Loss	5–2	Sep 2019	ITF Ceuta, Spain	15,000	Clay	(Russia) Ekaterina Shalimova	(Spain) Noelia Bouzó Zanotti (Spain) Angeles Moreno Barranquero	3–6, 6–1, [8–10]
Win	6–2	Sep 2019	ITF Melilla, Spain	15,000	Clay	(Russia) Anna Morgina	(Spain) Ángela Fita Boluda (Spain) Olga Parres Azcoitia	6–1, 6–7^{(2)}, [10–6]
Loss	6–3	Dec 2019	Pune Championships, India	25,000	Hard	(Russia) Anna Morgina	(Russia) Ekaterina Yashina (Norway) Ulrikke Eikeri	6–1, 3–6, [5–10]
Win	7–3	Oct 2020	ITF Sharm El Sheikh, Egypt	15,000	Hard	(Russia) Ksenia Laskutova	(Russia) Anastasia Gasanova (Ukraine) Valeriya Strakhova	5–7, 7–6^{(6)}, [10–4]
Win	8–3	Nov 2020	ITF Sharm El Sheikh	15,000	Hard	(Russia) Ksenia Laskutova	(Switzerland) Valentina Ryser (Switzerland) Lulu Sun	7–6^{(3)}, 7–6^{(2)}, [12–10]
Win	9–3	Dec 2020	ITF Cairo, Egypt	15,000	Hard	(Russia) Noel Saidenova	(Russia) Elina Avanesyan (Russia) Anastasia Tikhonova	6–2, 2–6, [11–9]
Loss	9–4	Feb 2021	ITF Shymkent, Kazakhstan	15,000	Hard (i)	(Russia) Noel Saidenova	(Poland) Weronika Baszak (Russia) Anastasia Tikhonova	2–6, 6–3, [6–10]
Loss	9–5	Feb 2021	ITF Shymkent	15,000	Hard (i)	(Russia) Noel Saidenova	(Russia) Ekaterina Kazionova (Uzbekistan) Sabina Sharipova	5–7, 6–2, [4–10]
Win	10–5	Jul 2021	ITF Moscow, Russia	15,000	Clay	(Russia) Anna Morgina	(Uzbekistan) Nigina Abduraimova (Russia) Angelina Gabueva	7–5, 2–6, [11–9]
Win	11–5	Aug 2021	ITF Almaty, Kazakhstan	25,000	Clay	(Uzbekistan) Nigina Abduraimova	(Uzbekistan) Sabina Sharipova (Netherlands) Stéphanie Visscher	4–6, 6–4, [10–3]
