= St. Petersburg Ladies' Trophy =

Tennis tournament

Defunct tennis tournament
- Tour: WTA Tour
- Founded: 2003
- Abolished: 2022 (until further notice)
- Location: Saint Petersburg, Russia
- Venue: Sibur Arena
- Surface: Hard (Indoor)
- Draw: 32S / 32Q / 16D
- Prize money: US$703,580 (2022)
- Website: lt.formulatx.com

Current champions (2022)
- Singles: (Estonia) Anett Kontaveit
- Doubles: (Russia) Anna Kalinskaya (United States) Caty McNally

The St. Petersburg Ladies' Trophy (Russian: Трофей Санкт-Петербурга, romanized: Trofey Sankt-Peterburga; formerly known as the Ladies Neva Cup) was a tournament for professional female tennis players played on indoor hardcourts. The event was classified as a WTA 500 tournament and was first held in St. Petersburg in 2003 until 2022.

== History ==
The event was held since 2003 in St. Petersburg. It was an ITF Women's Circuit event until 2015. In 2016, it was upgraded to a WTA Premier tournament in 2016, offering a prize money of $753,000, up from only $25,000 and $50,000 in previous years. The event replaced the Proximus Diamond Games on the WTA Tour from 2016.

== Past finals ==
=== Singles ===
Year	Champion	Runner-up	Score
↓ ITF event ↓
2003	(Russia) Evgenia Linetskaya	(Belarus) Tatsiana Uvarova	5–7, 6–4, 6–4
2004	(Belarus) Anastasiya Yakimova	(Finland) Emma Laine	3–6, 6–2, 6–1
2005	(Russia) Ekaterina Bychkova	(Finland) Emma Laine	6–1, 6–2
2006	(Italy) Alberta Brianti	(Russia) Alla Kudryavtseva	6–1, 6–4
2007	Not held		
2008	(Slovakia) Magdaléna Rybáriková	(Russia) Anna Lapushchenkova	6–4, 6–2
2009–14	Not held		
2015	(Latvia) Jeļena Ostapenko	(Romania) Patricia Maria Țig	3–6, 7–5, 6–2
↓ WTA Premier tournament ↓
2016	(Italy) Roberta Vinci	(Switzerland) Belinda Bencic	6–4, 6–3
2017	(France) Kristina Mladenovic	(Kazakhstan) Yulia Putintseva	6–2, 6–7^{(3–7)}, 6–4
2018	(Czech Republic) Petra Kvitová	(France) Kristina Mladenovic	6–1, 6–2
2019	(Netherlands) Kiki Bertens	(Croatia) Donna Vekić	7–6^{(7–2)}, 6–4
2020	(Netherlands) Kiki Bertens (2)	(Kazakhstan) Elena Rybakina	6–1, 6–3
↓ WTA 500 tournament ↓
2021	(Russia) Daria Kasatkina	(Russia) Margarita Gasparyan	6–3, 2–1 ret.
2022	(Estonia) Anett Kontaveit	(Greece) Maria Sakkari	5–7, 7–6^{(7–4)}, 7–5

=== Doubles ===
Year	Champions	Runners-up	Score
↓ ITF event ↓
2003	(Russia) Goulnara Fattakhetdinova (Russia) Galina Fokina	(Russia) Irina Bulykina (Belarus) Elena Yaryshka	6–0, 6–3
2004	(Russia) Maria Goloviznina (Russia) Evgenia Kulikovskaya	(Belarus) Darya Kustova (Ukraine) Elena Tatarkova	7–5, 6–1
2005	(Russia) Nina Bratchikova (Russia) Ekaterina Makarova	(Russia) Ekaterina Kosminskaya (Russia) Alla Kudryavtseva	7–6^{(7–2)}, 6–2
2006	(Russia) Anastasia Pavlyuchenkova (Russia) Yulia Solonitskaya	(Ukraine) Yuliya Beygelzimer (Russia) Alla Kudryavtseva	6–1, 6–4
2007	Not held		
2008	(Czech Republic) Nikola Fraňková (Russia) Anastasia Pavlyuchenkova (2)	(Russia) Nina Bratchikova (Russia) Vasilisa Davydova	6–2, 6–2
2009–14	Not held		
2015	(Switzerland) Viktorija Golubic (Belarus) Aliaksandra Sasnovich	(France) Stéphanie Foretz (Croatia) Ana Vrljić	6–4, 7–5
↓ WTA Premier tournament ↓
2016	(Switzerland) Martina Hingis (India) Sania Mirza	(Russia) Vera Dushevina (Czech Republic) Barbora Krejčíková	6–3, 6–1
2017	(Latvia) Jeļena Ostapenko (Poland) Alicja Rosolska	(Croatia) Darija Jurak (Switzerland) Xenia Knoll	3–6, 6–2, [10–5]
2018	(Switzerland) Timea Bacsinszky (Russia) Vera Zvonareva	(Russia) Alla Kudryavtseva (Slovenia) Katarina Srebotnik	2–6, 6–1, [10–3]
2019	(Russia) Margarita Gasparyan (Russia) Ekaterina Makarova (2)	(Russia) Anna Kalinskaya (Slovakia) Viktória Kužmová	7–5, 7–5
2020	(Japan) Shuko Aoyama (Japan) Ena Shibahara	(United States) Kaitlyn Christian (Chile) Alexa Guarachi	4–6, 6–0, [10–3]
↓ WTA 500 tournament ↓
2021	(Ukraine) Nadiia Kichenok (Romania) Raluca Olaru	(United States) Kaitlyn Christian (United States) Sabrina Santamaria	2–6, 6–3, [10–8]
2022	(Russia) Anna Kalinskaya (United States) Caty McNally	(Poland) Alicja Rosolska (New Zealand) Erin Routliffe	6–3, 6–7^{(5–7)}, [10–4]

== See also ==
- St. Petersburg Open – men's tournament
