= Ekaterina Shalimova =

Russian tennis player

Ekaterina Shalimova Екатерина Шалимова
- Full name: Ekaterina Vladimirovna Shalimova
- Country (sports): Russia
- Born: 1 June 2000 (age 26)
- Prize money: $74,120

Singles
- Career record: 159–114
- Career titles: 3 ITF
- Highest ranking: No. 379 (11 April 2022)

Doubles
- Career record: 99–77
- Career titles: 9 ITF
- Highest ranking: No. 340 (14 October 2019)
- Last updated on: 30 August 2026.

Ekaterina Vladimirovna Shalimova (Russian: Екатерина Владимировна Шалимова; born 1 June 2000) is a Russian inactive tennis player.

Shalimova who has career-high WTA rankings of 379 in singles and 340 in doubles, made her WTA Tour debut at the 2019 St. Petersburg Trophy in the doubles draw, partnered with Daria Mishina.

== ITF Circuit finals ==
=== Singles: 6 (3 titles, 3 runner-ups) ===
| Legend W25 tournaments W15 tournaments | Finals by surface Hard (2–3) Carpet (1–0) |

| Result | W–L | Date | Tournament | Tier | Surface | Opponent | Score |
|---|---|---|---|---|---|---|---|
| Win | 1–0 | July 2019 | ITF Don Benito, Spain | W15 | Carpet | (Spain) Maria José Luque Moreno | 6–1, 6–1 |
| Win | 2–0 | Sep 2019 | ITF Ceuta, Spain | W15 | Hard | (Russia) Daria Mishina | 6–4, 1–6, 6–1 |
| Loss | 2–1 | Nov 2021 | ITF Haabneeme, Estonia | W25 | Hard (i) | (United Kingdom) Katie Swan | 6–7^{(3)}, 3–6 |
| Loss | 2–2 | Nov 2022 | ITF Sharm El Sheikh, Egypt | W15 | Hard | (China) Li Zongyu | 3–6, 2–6 |
| Win | 3–2 | Aug 2023 | ITF Monastir, Tunisia | W15 | Hard | (Egypt) Merna Refaat | 3–6, 6–4, 6–2 |
| Loss | 3–3 | Nov 2023 | ITF Sharm El Sheikh, Egypt | W15 | Hard | (Russia) Alexandra Shubladze | 3–6, 5–7 |

=== Doubles: 17 (9 titles, 8 runner-ups) ===
| Legend W25/35 tournaments W15 tournaments | Finals by surface Hard (8–3) Clay (1–5) |

| Result | W–L | Date | Tournament | Tier | Surface | Partner | Opponents | Score |
|---|---|---|---|---|---|---|---|---|
| Win | 1–0 | Aug 2017 | ITF Savitaipale, Finland | W15 | Clay | (Russia) Valeriya Denisenko | (Russia) Aleksandra Kuznetsova (Russia) Gyulnara Nazarova | 7–6^{(6)}, 4–6, [10–6] |
| Loss | 1–1 | Sep 2019 | ITF Ceuta, Spain | W15 | Clay | (Russia) Daria Mishina | (Spain) Noelia Bouzó Zanotti (Spain) Angeles Moreno Barranquero | 3–6, 6–1, [8–10] |
| Loss | 1–2 | Oct 2019 | ITF Santarém, Portugal | W15 | Clay | (Portugal) Sara Lanca | (Spain) Celia Cerviño Ruiz (Portugal) Matilde Jorge | 3–6, 2–6 |
| Win | 2–2 | Jan 2020 | ITF Liepāja, Latvia | W15 | Hard (i) | (Belarus) Katyarina Paulenka | (Poland) Weronika Falkowska (Poland) Martyna Kubka | 4–6, 6–3, [12–10] |
| Loss | 2–3 | Apr 2021 | ITF Antalya, Turkey | W15 | Clay | (Russia) Victoria Mikhaylova | (Colombia) María Paulina Pérez (Italy) Federica Rossi | 6–2, 4–6, [6–10] |
| Loss | 2–4 | May 2021 | ITF Shymkent, Kazakhstan | W15 | Clay | (Russia) Ekaterina Reyngold | (Poland) Martyna Kubka (Kazakhstan) Zhibek Kulambayeva | 6–7^{(3)}, 7–5, [8–10] |
| Loss | 2–5 | Jun 2021 | ITF Shymkent, Kazakhstan | W15 | Clay | (Russia) Ekaterina Reyngold | (Poland) Martyna Kubka (Kazakhstan) Zhibek Kulambayeva | 4–6, 4–6 |
| Loss | 2–6 | Apr 2023 | ITF Sharm El Sheikh, Egypt | W15 | Hard | (Russia) Evgeniya Burdina | (Belarus) Aliona Falei (Russia) Polina Iatcenko | 4–6, 5–7 |
| Loss | 2–7 | Aug 2023 | ITF Monastir, Tunisia | W15 | Hard | (Germany) Julia Zhu | (Italy) Matilde Mariani (Poland) Joanna Zawadzka | 2–6, 2–6 |
| Win | 3–7 | Aug 2023 | ITF Monastir, Tunisia | W15 | Hard | (Slovakia) Radka Zelníčková | (Russia) Anastasiia Gureva (Italy) Beatrice Stagno | 6–7^{(4)}, 6–1, [10–8] |
| Loss | 3–8 | Oct 2023 | ITF Sharm El Sheikh, Egypt | W25 | Hard | (Slovakia) Katarína Kužmová | (Romania) Karola Bejenaru (France) Yasmine Mansouri | 2–6, 6–7^{(5)} |
| Win | 4–8 | Aug 2023 | ITF Monastir, Tunisia | W15 | Hard | (Russia) Mariia Tkacheva | (Switzerland) Paula Cembranos (Switzerland) Jenny Dürst | 6–2, 3–6, [10–6] |
| Win | 5–8 | Feb 2024 | ITF Sharm El Sheikh, Egypt | W15 | Hard | (Romania) Karola Bejenaru | (Belarus) Daria Khomutsianskaya (Belarus) Evialina Laskevich | 6–4, 6–2 |
| Win | 6–8 | Jul 2024 | President's Cup, Kazakhstan | W35 | Hard | (Russia) Anastasia Gasanova | (Russia) Vitalia Diatchenko (Kazakhstan) Zhanel Rustemova | 7–6^{(4)}, 2–6, [10–7] |
| Win | 7–8 | Oct 2024 | ITF Huzhou, China | W35 | Hard | (Russia) Sofya Lansere | (China) Xiao Zhenghua (China) Ye Qiuyu | 6–2, 6–3 |
| Win | 8–8 | Oct 2024 | ITF Qiandaohu, China | W35 | Hard | (Russia) Sofya Lansere | (China) Xun Fangying (China) Zhang Ying | 4–6, 6–4, [10–5] |
| Win | 9–8 | Mar 2025 | ITF Ma'anshan, China | W15 | Hard | (Russia) Daria Egorova | (South Korea) Kim Na-ri (China) Ye Qiuyu | 6–2, 7–5 |
