= Kristina Mladenovic =

French tennis player (born 1993)

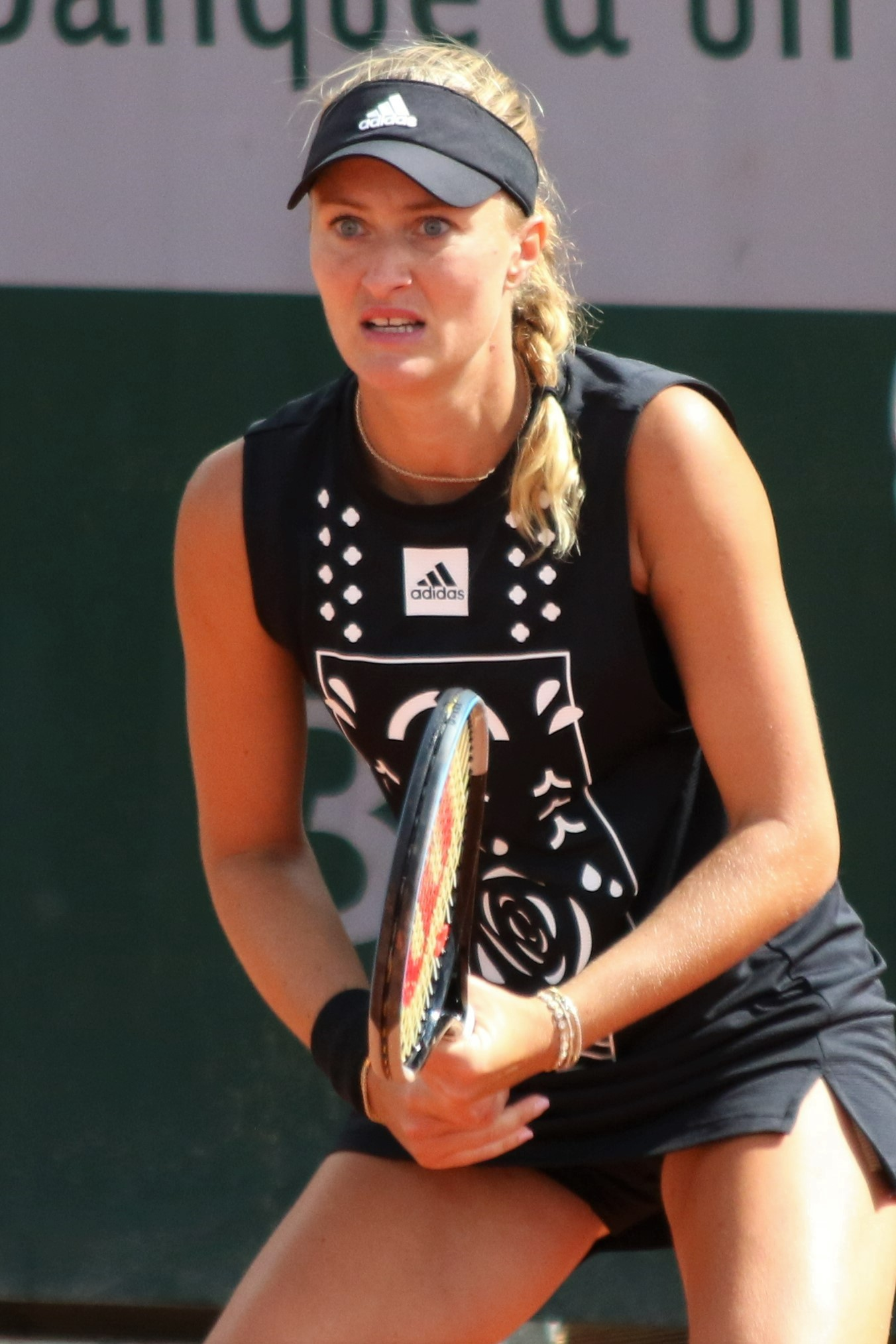
- Mladenovic at the 2022 French Open
- Native name: Kristina Mladenovic
- Country (sports): France
- Residence: Dubai, UAE
- Born: 14 May 1993 (age 33) Saint-Pol-sur-Mer, France
- Height: 1.84 m (6 ft 0 in)
- Turned pro: 2009
- Plays: Right (two-handed backhand)
- Coach: Dženita Mladenović
- Prize money: US$ 15,032,430: 45th in all-time rankings

Singles
- Career record: 447–437
- Career titles: 1
- Highest ranking: No. 10 (23 October 2017)
- Current ranking: No. 825 (28 September 2026)

Grand Slam singles results
- Australian Open: 3R (2016, 2021)
- French Open: QF (2017)
- Wimbledon: 3R (2015, 2018)
- US Open: QF (2015)

Other tournaments
- Tour Finals: Alt (2017)
- Olympic Games: 2R (2016)

Doubles
- Career record: 486–216
- Career titles: 31
- Highest ranking: No. 1 (10 June 2019)
- Current ranking: No. 11 (28 September 2026)

Grand Slam doubles results
- Australian Open: W (2018, 2020)
- French Open: W (2016, 2019, 2020, 2022)
- Wimbledon: W (2026)
- US Open: F (2016, 2018, 2024)

Other doubles tournaments
- Tour Finals: W (2018, 2019)
- Olympic Games: 1R (2012, 2016, 2021)

Mixed doubles
- Career titles: 3

Grand Slam mixed doubles results
- Australian Open: W (2014, 2022)
- French Open: F (2013)
- Wimbledon: W (2013)
- US Open: SF (2013)

Other mixed doubles tournaments
- Olympic Games: 1R (2016, 2021)

Team competitions
- BJK Cup: W (2019), record 30-12
- Hopman Cup: W (2017)
- Last updated on: 6 October 2026.

Kristina "Kiki" Mladenovic (born 14 May 1993) is a French professional tennis player and a former world No. 1 in doubles. Her best singles ranking is world No. 10. She is a ten-time Grand Slam champion, having won the 2016 and 2022 French Open women's doubles titles, partnering Caroline Garcia, and the 2018 Australian Open, 2019 and 2020 French Opens and 2020 Australian Open with Tímea Babos as well as the 2026 Wimbledon Championships, partnering with Guo Hanyu.

In mixed doubles, Mladenovic won the 2013 Wimbledon Championships and 2014 Australian Open alongside Daniel Nestor, and the 2022 Australian Open with Ivan Dodig. She has also reached a further six major finals across women's and mixed doubles. Mladenovic became world No. 1 in doubles for the first time in June 2019, and has held the top ranking for a total of 12 weeks. She has won 30 career doubles titles, including the 2018 and 2019 WTA Finals and four at WTA 1000 level.

Mladenovic has also enjoyed success in singles, and reached her career-high ranking of world No. 10 in October 2017. She has won one WTA Tour singles title, at the 2017 St. Petersburg Trophy, and finished runner-up on seven occasions. Her best Grand Slam performance was reaching the quarterfinals at the 2015 US Open and the 2017 French Open.

Mladenovic has represented France in the Fed Cup and Billie Jean King Cup since 2012, and was part of the team which won the competition in 2019. She has also competed at the Olympic Games on three occasions.

== Personal life ==
Kristina Mladenovic was born in Saint-Pol-sur-Mer, in the Nord department of France. Her father is Dragan Mladenović, a former Serbian and Yugoslav handball player, and her mother Dženita Helić is a Serbian former volleyball player. They moved to France in 1992 when Dragan was signed by Dunkerque HGL. All became French citizens. Mladenovic has a brother named Luka. She dated Austrian tennis player Dominic Thiem from the middle of 2017 until the couple split in November 2019.

== Career ==
=== 2006–2008: Beginnings ===
Mladenovic started playing juniors in May 2006. In 2007, she became the European Under-14 singles champion. Her biggest junior achievement was at the 2009 French Open girls' singles, where she beat Daria Gavrilova of Russia in two sets in the final. Mladenovic began playing on the ITF Women's Circuit in September 2007.

On the WTA Tour, she tried to qualify for 2008 Open Gaz de France but lost her first match to Petra Kvitová.

=== 2009: World No. 1 junior, major and WTA Tour debuts ===
Mladenovic turned professional in 2009, making her Grand Slam debut at that year's Australian Open where she received a wildcard but was defeated by 14th seed Patty Schnyder.

Her highest junior ranking was world No. 1 on 8 June 2009. She advanced to both the girls' singles and doubles finals at the 2009 Wimbledon Championships, losing to Noppawan Lertcheewakarn in the singles. In doubles, with partner Silvia Njirić, lost also to Lertcheewakarn, who partnered with Sally Peers.

In July, she qualified for the 2009 Prague Open and lost in the first round to Zarina Diyas of Kazakhstan.

At the Internationaux de Strasbourg, Mladenovic won her first match on the WTA Tour, coming back from 2–5 in the final set to win the tiebreak against Stefanie Vögele.

Mladenovic played for France at the 2011 Hopman Cup, partnering with Nicolas Mahut. France was drawn in the same group as the United States, Great Britain, and Italy. Mladenovic beat Francesca Schiavone and Laura Robson while losing to Bethanie Mattek-Sands in the singles matches. In the mixed doubles, she and Mahut won one of their three matches.

In 2011, she won her first women's title at a $25k tournament in Sutton, defeating Mona Barthel. This was followed by a win in Stockholm the following week, defeating Arantxa Rus in the final.

=== 2012: Breakthrough ===
At the start of the year, Mladenovic linked up with Biljana Veselinovic but they split just before Wimbledon and since then she had been coached by Thierry Ascione. She claimed her first WTA Tour title of any type in Montreal when she and Klaudia Jans-Ignacik won the doubles title at the Rogers Cup. Mladenovic made it through to the third round of the US Open by defeating Pavlyuchenkova. At the Bell Classic in Québec, she reached her first WTA Tour semifinal with Tatjana Malek, and won her second career doubles title. Following her run, she entered the top 100 in the rankings for the first time. Mladenovic won the first ever WTA 125 event, the Taipei Ladies Open, and took the doubles crown as well.

=== 2013: First major mixed doubles title ===
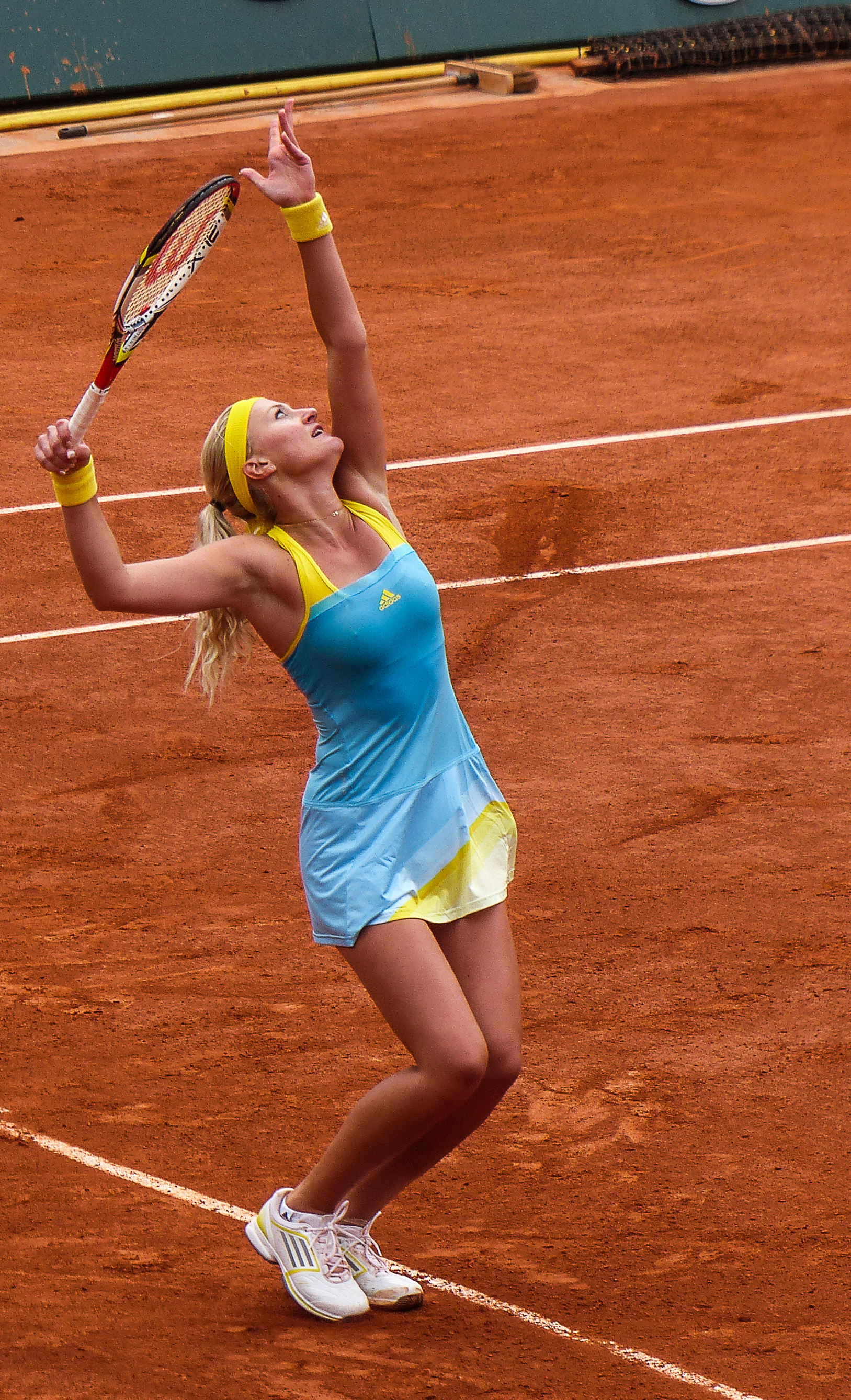
Mladenovic at the 2013 French Open

At the Open GdF Suez, a Premier tournament, Mladenovic made the semifinals, including defeating Petra Kvitová. Teaming with Daniel Nestor, she made it to the final of the French Open in mixed doubles where they were defeated. However, she and Nestor rebounded at the mixed doubles at Wimbledon, capturing her first Grand Slam title.

At the 2013 US Open, she beat Anabel Medina Garrigues in the first round and then lost to the 23rd seed Jamie Hampton in two sets. Mladenovic partnered up with Daniel Nestor to reach the semifinals of the mixed doubles, where they were defeated by the seventh-seeded team of Max Mirnyi and Andrea Hlaváčková in a close three-setter.

=== 2014: Australian Open mixed doubles champion ===
Mladenovic started 2014 off strong, capturing her second mixed-doubles title at the Australian Open partnering again with Nestor. At the Open GdF Suez, she defeated Australian Open quarterfinalist Simona Halep in the first round. Partnering Daniel Nestor she won her second major title in the mixed doubles event.

At Roland Garros, she upset Li Na (world No. 2 and 2011 champion) in the first round, her first top-5 win. She continued her strong performance with a three-set win over Alison Riske in the second round. In the round of 32, she was beaten by eventual semifinalist Andrea Petkovic. Mladenovic opened her grass-court season in Birmingham, but lost her opening match to Shahar Pe'er. She then competed in 's-Hertogenbosch qualifying, managing to win a round but ultimately falling to CoCo Vandeweghe, who would go on to qualify and win the entire tournament. At Wimbledon, she drew Zarina Diyas in the first round, but fell to the Kazakh in a rain delayed straight-set encounter. In the doubles draw, Mladenovic partnered Tímea Babos, and reached their first Grand Slam women's doubles final, ultimately losing to Sara Errani and Roberta Vinci in straight sets. She then stunned at the İstanbul Cup the third seed Klára Koukalová, but lost in the semifinals to No. 1 seed Caroline Wozniacki. Her strong run returned her to the top 100, at No. 81. At Baku, she lost in quarterfinals, losing to Francesca Schiavone in a rematch of the İstanbul Cup quarterfinals. She next competed at the Washington Open, where she stunned top seeded Lucie Šafářová, before defeating qualifier Taylor Townsend. She lost to Kurumi Nara in the quarterfinals. Mladenovic lost in the final round of qualifying to Yanina Wickmayer in Montréal, and also the first round of qualifying in Cincinnati. She played doubles in Montréal, losing in the first round with partner Tímea Babos.

=== 2015: Major quarterfinal, top 30 in singles ===
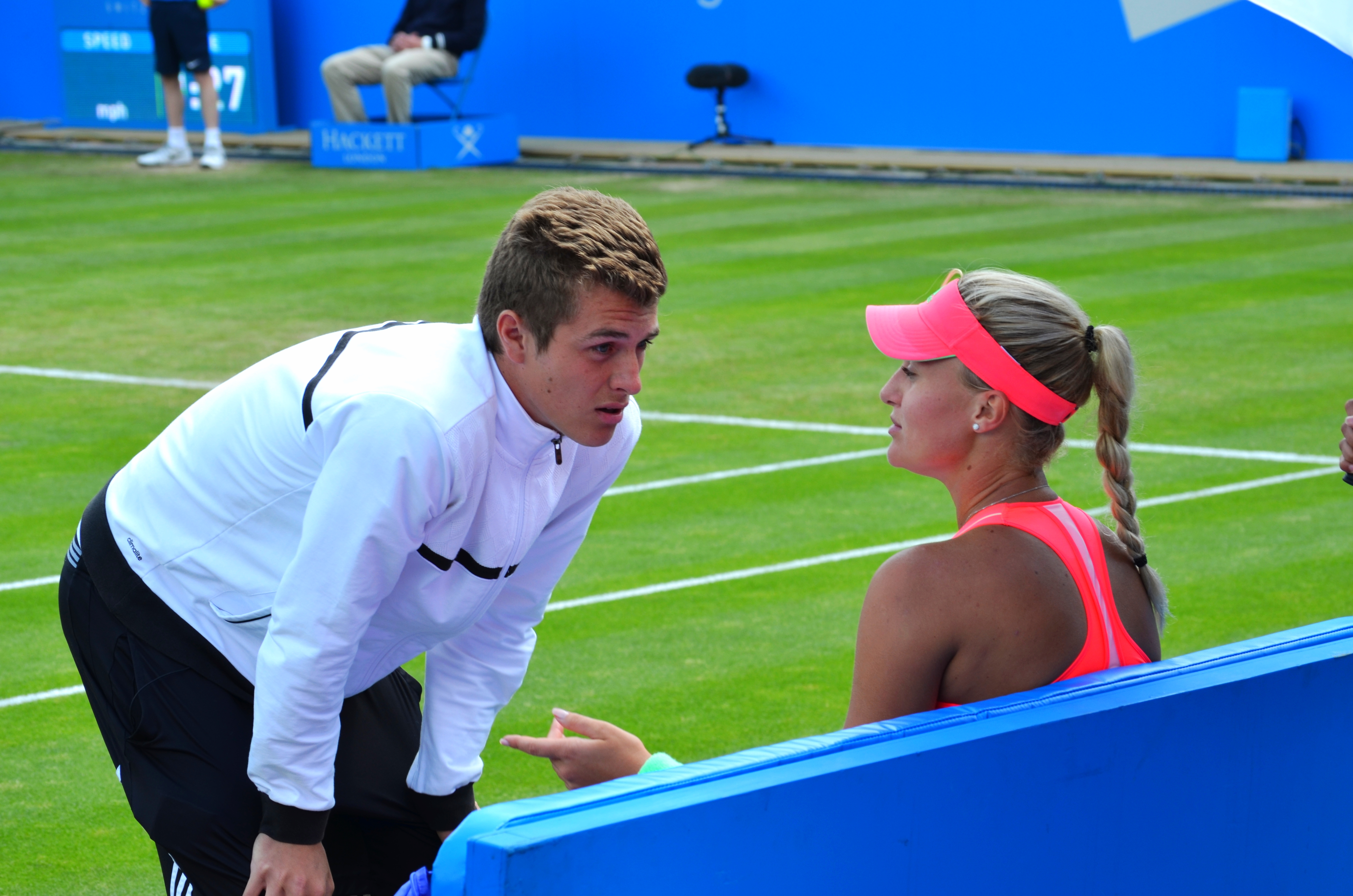
Mladenovic with her brother Luka at the 2015 Birmingham Classic

Mladenovic began the year losing in the second round of the Australian Open to Bethanie Mattek-Sands. She, along with Daniel Nestor, reached the final of the mixed-doubles event. She lost in the second round of the Diamond Games in Antwerp to Lucie Šafářová.

She reached the semifinals of Marrakesh, losing to her doubles partner Tímea Babos. She reached the singles final in Strasbourg, her first ever WTA Tour singles final, where she lost to Samantha Stosur. Her strong showing at both tournaments ensured her entry into the top 50 of the WTA singles rankings.

At the French Open, Mladenovic once again stunned a top-10 player in her opening match by defeating world No. 6, Eugenie Bouchard. She advanced to the third round with a victory over Danka Kovinić but lost to Alison Van Uytvanck in straight sets while fighting for a spot in the last 16.

At the Rosmalen Open, Mladenovic lost to eventual finalist and good friend Belinda Bencic, despite having match points. At the Birmingham Classic, she beat Bouchard again (3–6, 6–4, 6–0), and then once again stunned a top-10 player by defeating world No. 3, Simona Halep, 2–6, 6–0, 7–6.

At the US Open, she reached the quarterfinals with wins over Svetlana Kuznetsova, Bojana Jovanovski, lucky loser Daria Kasatkina and Ekaterina Makarova before losing to eventual finalist Roberta Vinci in the quarterfinals, and entered the top 30 of the WTA singles rankings for the first time in her career.

=== 2016: French Open doubles champion ===
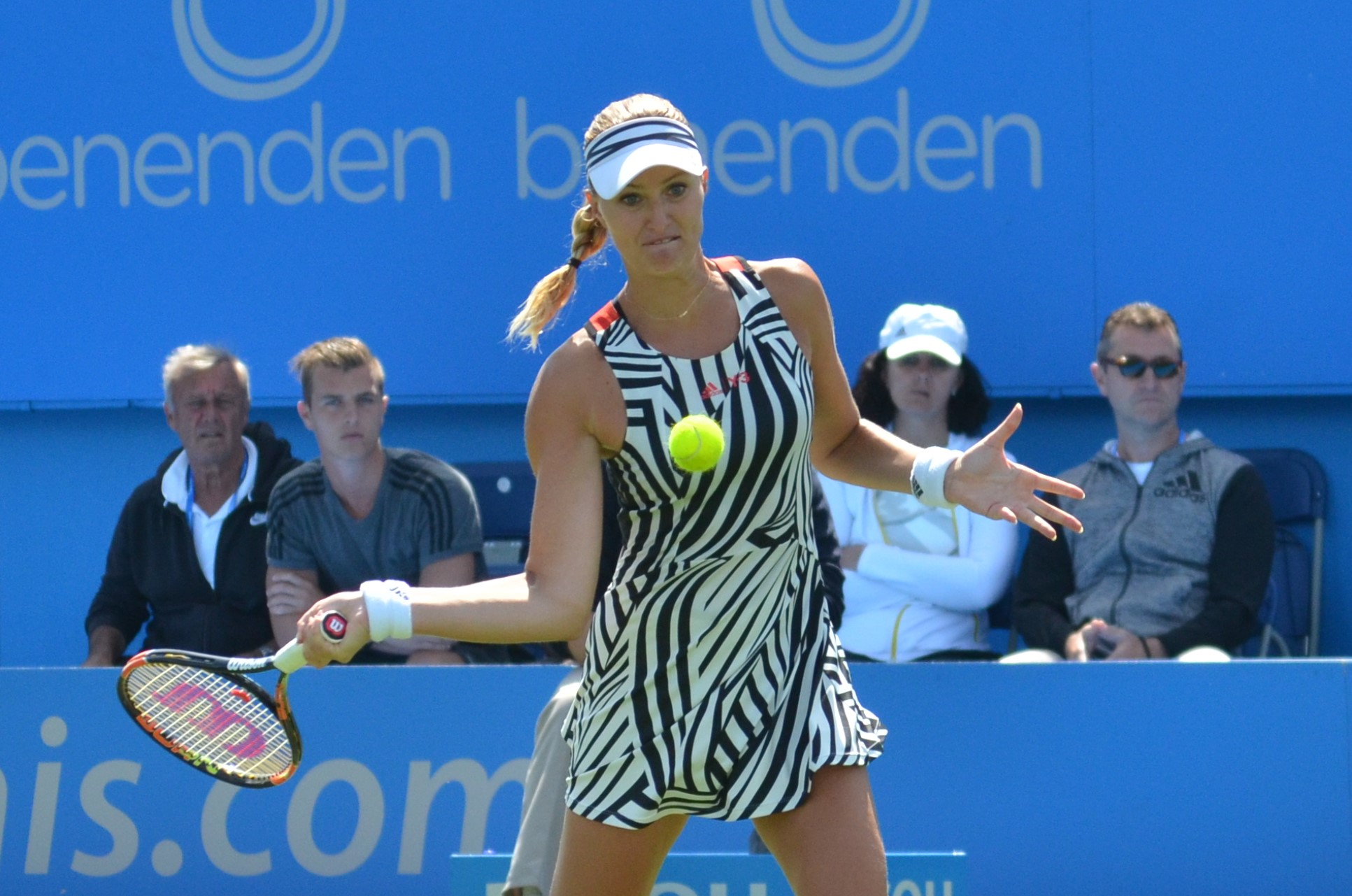
Mladenovic at the 2016 Eastbourne International

In May, Mladenovic reached the singles semifinals of the Internationaux de Strasbourg, but lost to Mirjana Lučić-Baroni.

At the French Open, Mladenovic won her first-round match against the 2010 French Open singles champion Francesca Schiavone, and defeated her former doubles partner Tímea Babos in the second. She lost in the third round to world No. 1 and defending champion, Serena Williams, in two sets, after having a set point at 9–8 in the tiebreak. Mladenovic won the doubles event partnering Caroline Garcia, beating Ekaterina Makarova and Elena Vesnina in the final. It was the first Grand Slam women's doubles crown for Garcia and Mladenovic, and they became the first all-French pair to win the French Open women's doubles title since Gail Chanfreau and Françoise Dürr in 1971. In June, Mladenovic reached her second tour singles final at the Rosmalen Grass Court Championships in which she lost to CoCo Vandeweghe.

Mladenovic participated in the singles, doubles and mixed-doubles events of the London Olympics. In the women's singles, she was defeated in the second round by Madison Keys. In the women's doubles event, Mladenovic partnered Caroline Garcia, with whom she had won the French Open in June. Despite being seeded second, the French duo lost in the first round. Mladenovic (she was paired with Pierre-Hugues Herbert and they were seeded second) also lost in the first round of the mixed-doubles event.

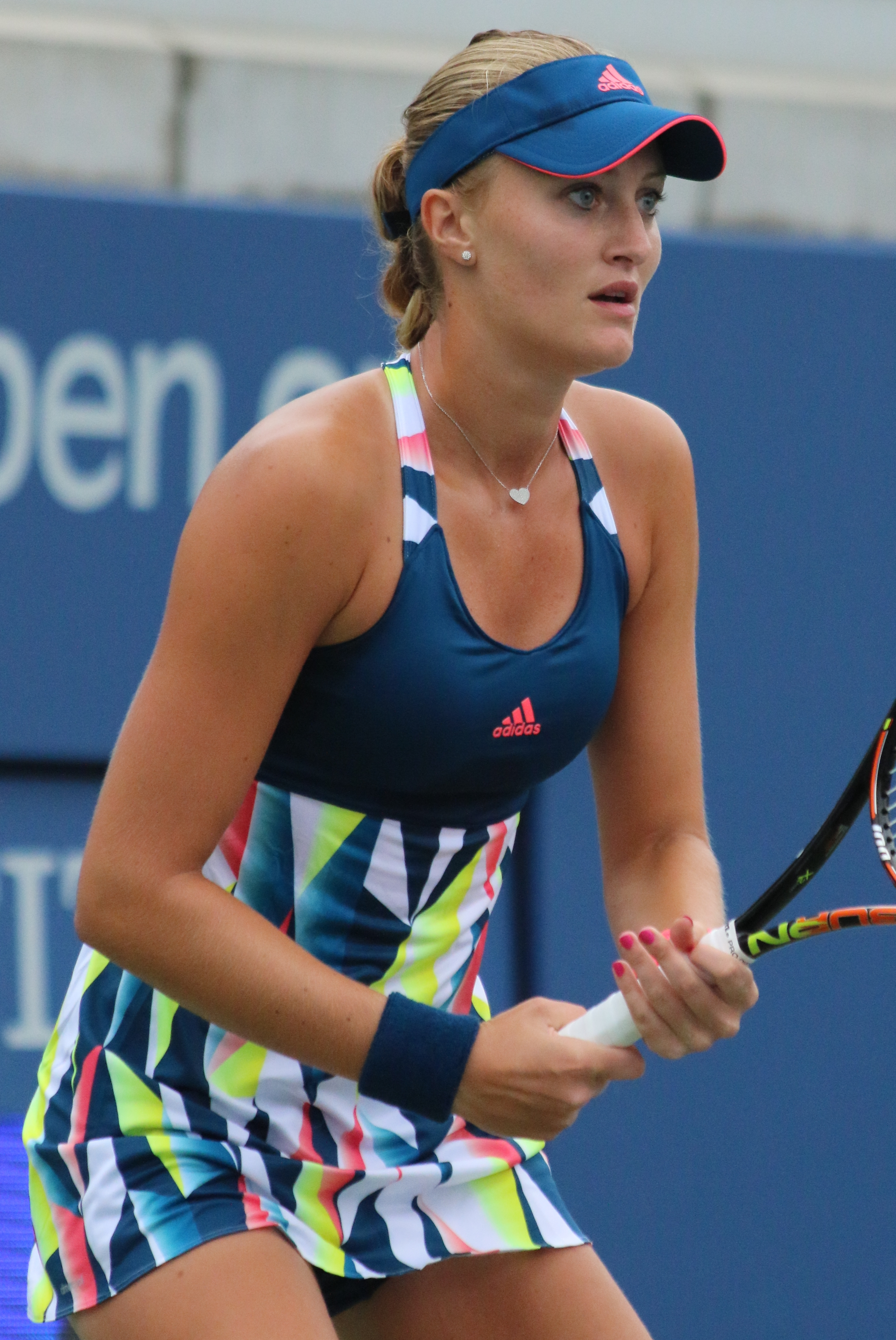
Mladenovic at the 2016 US Open

At the US Open singles event, Mladenovic cleared the first round before falling to Anastasia Pavlyuchenkova in the second, where she played one of the longest sets in tournament history (since the advent of the tiebreak in 1970), the third set running a whopping 94 minutes. In doubles, Mladenovic (partnered with Garcia) reached the final, where the French team was defeated by Bethanie Mattek-Sands and Lucie Šafářová. This allowed Garcia and Mladenovic to qualify for the WTA Finals, becoming the second doubles team yet to do so.

Mladenovic moved on to the Asian swing, starting at the Korea Open. Seeded No. 4, Mladenovic had a surprise loss against Sara Sorribes Tormo, the 139th player in the world. Next, at the Wuhan Open, she faced world No. 1, Angelique Kerber in the second round. Kerber won the match, although Mladenovic captured the first set. In doubles, Mladenovic partnered with Garcia again, and the team was seeded No. 1. Despite this, the French women lost their opening match against Christina McHale and Peng Shuai. In Beijing, Mladenovic defeated Jelena Janković in the first round, before facing eighth seed Madison Keys. Keys won in straight sets. In doubles, Mladenovic and Garcia, once again the No. 1 seeds, made their way to the final, in which they faced Mattek-Sands and Šafářová, in a rematch of the US Open final a few weeks earlier. Mattek-Sands and Šafářová won the final in two sets.

Mladenovic had success in singles at the Hong Kong Open. An unseeded player, she reached the semifinals after defeating doubles rival Mattek-Sands in the quarterfinals. She passed No. 8 seed Daria Gavrilova to enter her second singles final of the year in which she was defeated by former No. 1 Wozniacki.

Shortly before heading into the WTA Finals, Mladenovic and Garcia received the WTA Award for Best Doubles Team of the Year. During the WTA Finals, the French women defeated Julia Görges and Karolína Plíšková in the quarterfinals, but fell to Mattek-Sands and Šafářová in the semifinals.

During the 2016 Fed Cup final between France and the Czech Republic, Mladenovic lost the first rubber narrowly against Karolína Plíšková, a match that lasted 3 hours 48 minutes. She later played doubles with Garcia in the fifth and decisive rubber against Plíšková and Barbora Strýcová, which they lost in straight sets, enabling the Czechs to win the Fed Cup for the fifth time in six years.

In December, Garcia and Mladenovic were named the doubles ITF World Champions of 2016. Mladenovic ended the year ranked No. 42 in singles, and tied No. 2 in doubles (with Garcia).

=== 2017: First WTA title, top 10 in singles ===
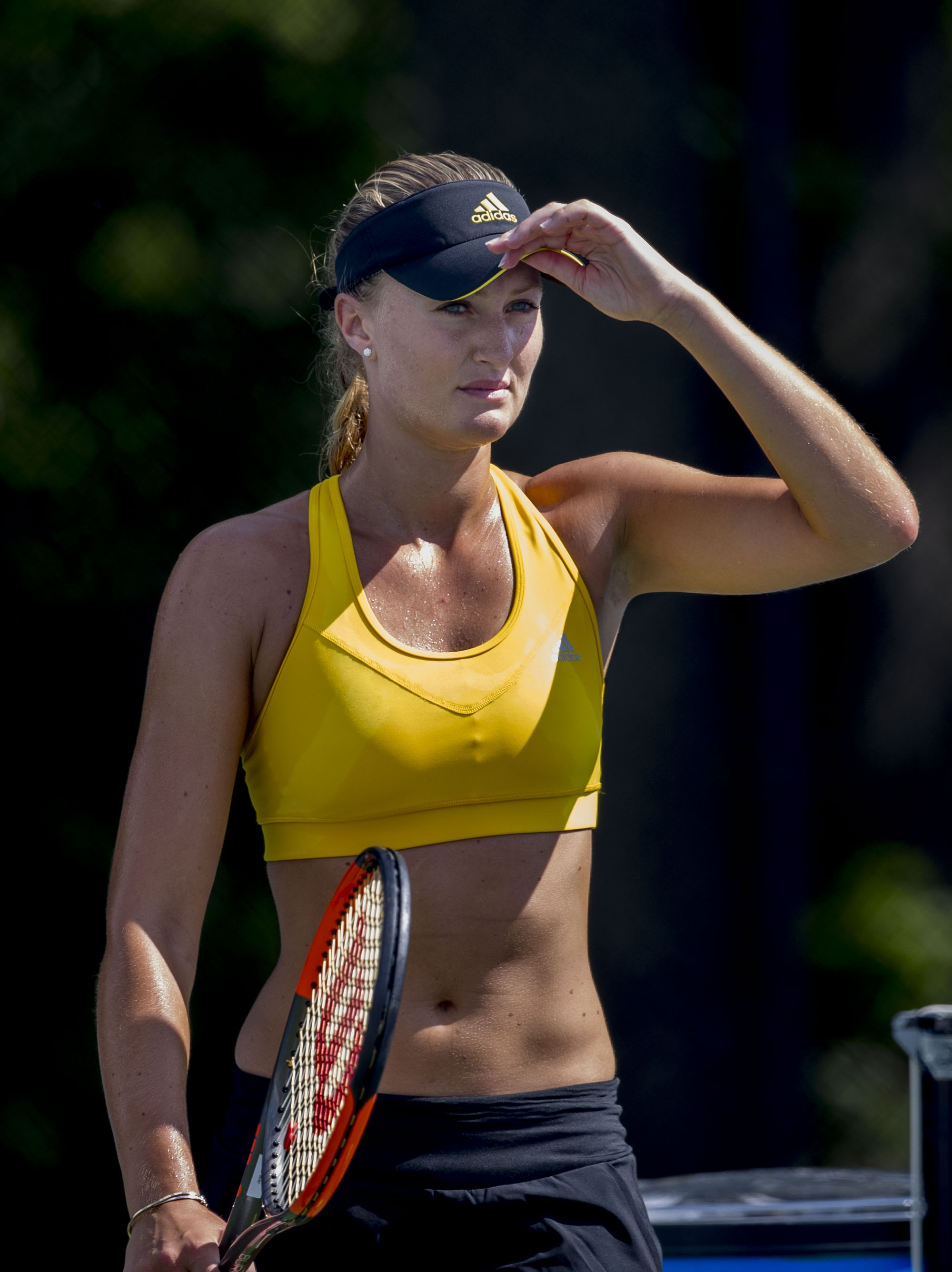
Mladenovic at the 2017 Citi Open

Mladenovic began the year by playing at the Hopman Cup alongside Richard Gasquet. The pair won their first tie against Germany's Andrea Petkovic and Alexander Zverev 2–1 (Mladenovic lost her singles match against Petkovic), and their second tie against Great Britain's Dan Evans and Heather Watson 3–0. In France's third Group A tie against Switzerland which would decide which team would enter the final, Mladenovic (following Gasquet's defeat to Roger Federer) defeated Belinda Bencic and triumphed with Gasquet against the Swiss pair in mixed doubles, winning the tie 2–1. In the final, Mladenovic and Gasquet faced Americans Jack Sock and CoCo Vandeweghe. Although Gasquet won his singles match and Mladenovic lost hers, the French duo won the decisive mixed-doubles match, meaning that France were the 2017 Hopman Cup champions.

Mladenovic had a disappointing run at the Australian Open in singles, losing in the first round to Ana Konjuh. However, in doubles, reunited with partner Caroline Garcia, she reached the semifinals of the event, where they lost to Andrea Hlaváčková and Peng Shuai. At the St. Petersburg Ladies' Trophy, Mladenovic won her first round match against Elise Mertens before upsetting reigning Australian Open finalist Venus Williams to reach the quarterfinals. She continued her fabulous form against sixth seed and defending champion, Roberta Vinci, defeating the Italian veteran in straight sets. In the semifinals, the French woman defeated rising player Natalia Vikhlyantseva to reach the first WTA Premier singles final of her career. In a tense final, Mladenovic defeated Yulia Putintseva, 6–2, 6–7, 6–4 to win the first WTA Tour singles title of her career. Mladenovic became the first French woman to win a WTA Premier singles title since Marion Bartoli in Eastbourne in June 2011. In addition, Mladenovic competed in doubles with Daria Gavrilova (this was the first time Mladenovic played with someone other than Garcia in over a year) but the pair were defeated in the semifinals.

In the Fed Cup World Group quarterfinals against Switzerland, Mladenovic won her first singles match against Belinda Bencic. However, she then lost to Timea Bacsinszky in her next singles match. France lost the tie 1–4, resulting in France needing to win the Fed Cup World Group Play-off tie to earn the right to play in the 2018 World Group.

At Dubai, at the first Premier-5 event of the season, Mladenovic defeated Kateřina Siniaková in the first round before defeating world No. 3, Karolína Plíšková, 6–2, 6–4 in the second round. She then lost to Wang Qiang in the third round. Mladenovic's good form continued at the Mexican Open, where she stormed past Varvara Lepchenko before winning a marathon match against Heather Watson to reach the quarterfinals, in which she defeated Kirsten Flipkens. Mladenovic then won her semifinal encounter with Christina McHale, reaching her second WTA Tour singles final of 2017. Though she did end up losing to Lesia Tsurenko in the final, her success in February allowed Mladenovic to reach a career-high WTA singles ranking of No. 26. Moreover, Mladenovic was nominated for February's WTA Shot of the Month, WTA Breakthrough Player of the Month, and WTA Player of the Month (winning the WTA Breakthrough Player of the Month).

Prior to the Indian Wells Open, Mladenovic announced that her doubles partnership with Caroline Garcia would end because Garcia wanted to focus on her singles career. Mladenovic instead competed with Svetlana Kuznetsova in the doubles draw of Indian Wells. Meanwhile, in singles, the French woman received a bye into the second round, being seeded No. 28. She had a strong opening, defeating Annika Beck of Germany. In the third round, Mladenovic continued her newfound success by defeating world No. 4, Simona Halep, in straight sets, setting up an encounter with Lauren Davis, which she won in straight sets as well, reaching her first career Premier Mandatory singles quarterfinals. Mladenovic continued to shine, defeating Caroline Wozniacki (Mladenovic had never beaten Wozniacki in three previous encounters) before losing to eventual champion Elena Vesnina in the semifinals. Her good performance at Indian Wells enabled Mladenovic to attain a career-high singles ranking of No. 18, and she became the No. 1 French woman once again (passing Caroline Garcia). She also had success with Kuznetsova in the doubles, knocking out the fifth-seeded pair of Andrea Hlaváčková and Peng Shuai in the second round before losing in the quarterfinals.

At the Miami Open, Mladenovic lost her opening singles match to the Romanian qualifier Patricia Maria Țig. In doubles, playing again with Kuznetsova, she faced Hlaváčková and Peng in the quarterfinals, in a repeat of their Indian Wells encounter. This time, Hlaváčková and Peng won the match, and Mladenovic missed the opportunity to become doubles world No. 1.

At the Porsche Tennis Grand Prix, Mladenovic defeated top seed Angelique Kerber in the second round and three-time champion Maria Sharapova (who was playing her first WTA tournament, after serving a 15-month suspension for failing a drug test) in the semifinals to reach her third WTA Tour singles final of the year. Against German wildcard Laura Siegemund (who was playing in her hometown), Mladenovic led 4–1 in the final set tiebreak but ended losing the match 1–6, 6–2, 6–7.

Mladenovic, seeded No. 14, reached her first career Premier Mandatory singles final at the Madrid Open by defeating her doubles partner Svetlana Kuznetsova in the semifinals. In the final, she lost to third seeded Simona Halep in three sets. On 15 May (the day after the Madrid final), Mladenovic reached a career-high WTA singles ranking of No. 14. Seeded No. 13, Mladenovic lost her singles first round match against Julia Görges at the Italian Open. At her home Grand Slam, the French Open, she won her first-round match in a tight three sets against American Jennifer Brady. In the second round, she faced the 2012 finalist Sara Errani whom she defeated in straight sets. In the third round, she had a close match against Shelby Rogers and advanced to the fourth round, her best showing at this tournament. She defeated the fourth seed and defending champion Garbiñe Muguruza in three sets to advance to her second quarterfinal of a Grand Slam tournament in her career. She then lost to Timea Bacsinszky.

Her form declined in the second half of the season. At Wimbledon, she lost in the singles second round, sustaining a right knee injury in the process. Over the next four months, she struggled to get back into shape again and suffered a loss of confidence. This caused Mladenovic to lose all twelve of her remaining singles matches of 2018 after winning her first-round singles match at the Washington Open (she won only two sets in those 12 singles matches) at various hard-court tournaments (including the US Open) in North America, Asia and Europe. Arguably her worst moment came at the Pan Pacific Open, where she suffered a double bagel defeat in the first round against Wang Qiang.

However, due to a consistent first half of the season which saw Mladenovic being constantly in the top eight of the Race to Singapore, she eventually broke into the top ten of the singles rankings for the first time in her career (at No. 10) on 23 October 2017, at the start of the WTA Finals. And because of big results in that half of the season, Mladenovic called the season "still the best of my career", when opening about her singles slump in the second half of the year.

=== 2018: Australian Open doubles title ===
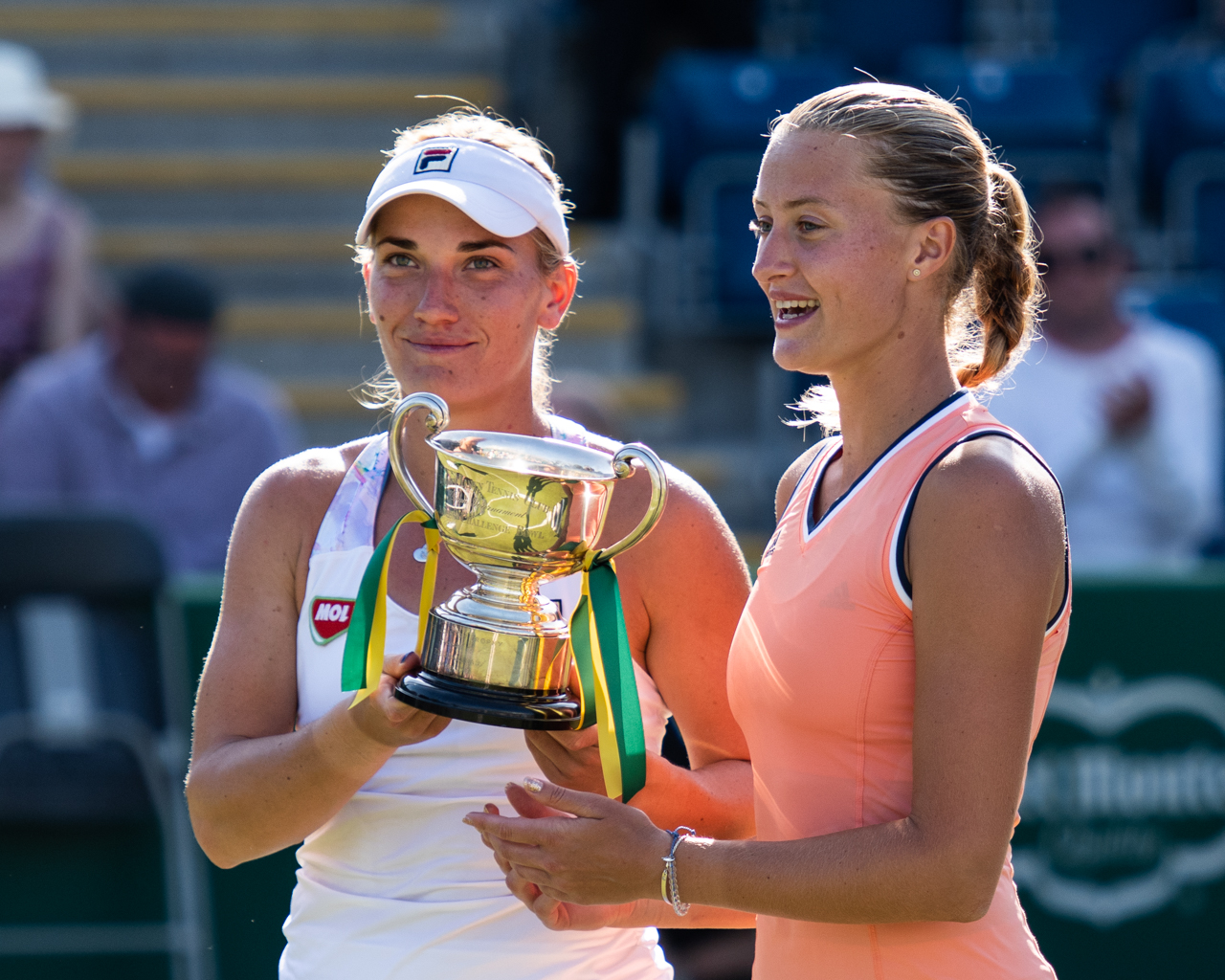
Mladenovic (right) and Tímea Babos at the 2018 Birmingham Classic

Mladenovic started her season at the Brisbane International, where she lost in the first round to the eventual singles finalist Aliaksandra Sasnovich in three sets. In her next tournament, the Sydney International, she retired in second set of her first-round match against the Australian wildcard Ellen Perez due to heat stress. At the Australian Open, Mladenovic's poor form in singles continued, losing her first round match in straight sets to world No. 104, Ana Bogdan from Romania, extending her losing streak in singles to 15 consecutive matches. Opening up about the loss, Mladenovic stated that it was not about injury anymore, that it was just a bad day and that it could not continue like that. Mladenovic turned things around when she won the Australian Open women's doubles with Tímea Babos, thus winning her second career Grand Slam women's doubles title.

Mladenovic next played in St. Petersburg as the defending singles champion. After receiving a first-round bye, Mladenovic showed signs of her top form and confidence which enabled her to reach four WTA singles finals in the first half of 2017 by defeating former top-5 player and 2016 WTA Finals champion Dominika Cibulková in the second round, ending her 15-match losing streak in singles. She then followed up her second round win by beating Kateřina Siniaková in the quarterfinals and Daria Kasatkina in the semifinals (who had beaten the 2018 Australian Open champion Caroline Wozniacki previously), to advance to her first WTA Tour singles final since the Madrid Open the previous year. In the final, she lost to Petra Kvitová in straight sets. Mladenovic won both her singles matches and her doubles match in the Fed Cup World Group quarterfinal tie against Belgium on February 10–11. She lost her singles second round and first round matches in Doha and Dubai, respectively.

Mladenovic losther second singles quarterfinal of the year in Acapulco to the defending champion, Lesia Tsurenko. In Indian Wells, she defeated Samantha Stosur in the second round, before losing to Wang Qiang who improved their head-to-head to 3–0. In the Indian Wells doubles event, Mladenovic partnered Babos and they lost in the semifinals to Ekaterina Makarova and Elena Vesnina. Mladenovic lost her opening singles match in Miami to Petra Martić. She lost her first-round matches in three (Lugano, Stuttgart and Rome) of her next five tournaments, winning a total of three singles matches in the other two (Fed Cup World Group semifinals and Madrid).

At the French Open, the 29th seeded Mladenovic lost in the singles first round to Andrea Petkovic. Mladenovic and Babos were the women's doubles top seeds at that tournament, losing in the quarterfinals to the unseeded Japanese pair of Eri Hozumi and Makoto Ninomiya. On 11 June, Mladenovic's WTA singles ranking fell to world No. 54, compared to No. 31 two weeks earlier. She played her first grass-court tournament of the year in Birmingham, where she lost in the singles second round to the unseeded Magdaléna Rybáriková. Mladenovic and Babos won the Birmingham title defeating Elise Mertens and Demi Schuurs in the final. The following week in Eastbourne, the again unseeded Mladenovic lost in the singles second round to the No. 8 seed Ashleigh Barty. The unseeded Mladenovic was defeated in the third round of Wimbledon by Serena Williams in two sets, and the top-seeded pair of Mladenovic and Babos were eliminated in the quarterfinals.

Mladenovic lost her opening singles matches (both in straight sets) in her next two tournaments, to Tímea Babos and Victoria Azarenka in San Jose and Montreal, respectively. Mladenovic registered her first top-10 singles win of 2018 in Cincinnati when Julia Görges retired in the first round because of a calf injury.

=== 2019: World No. 1, French Open title in doubles ===
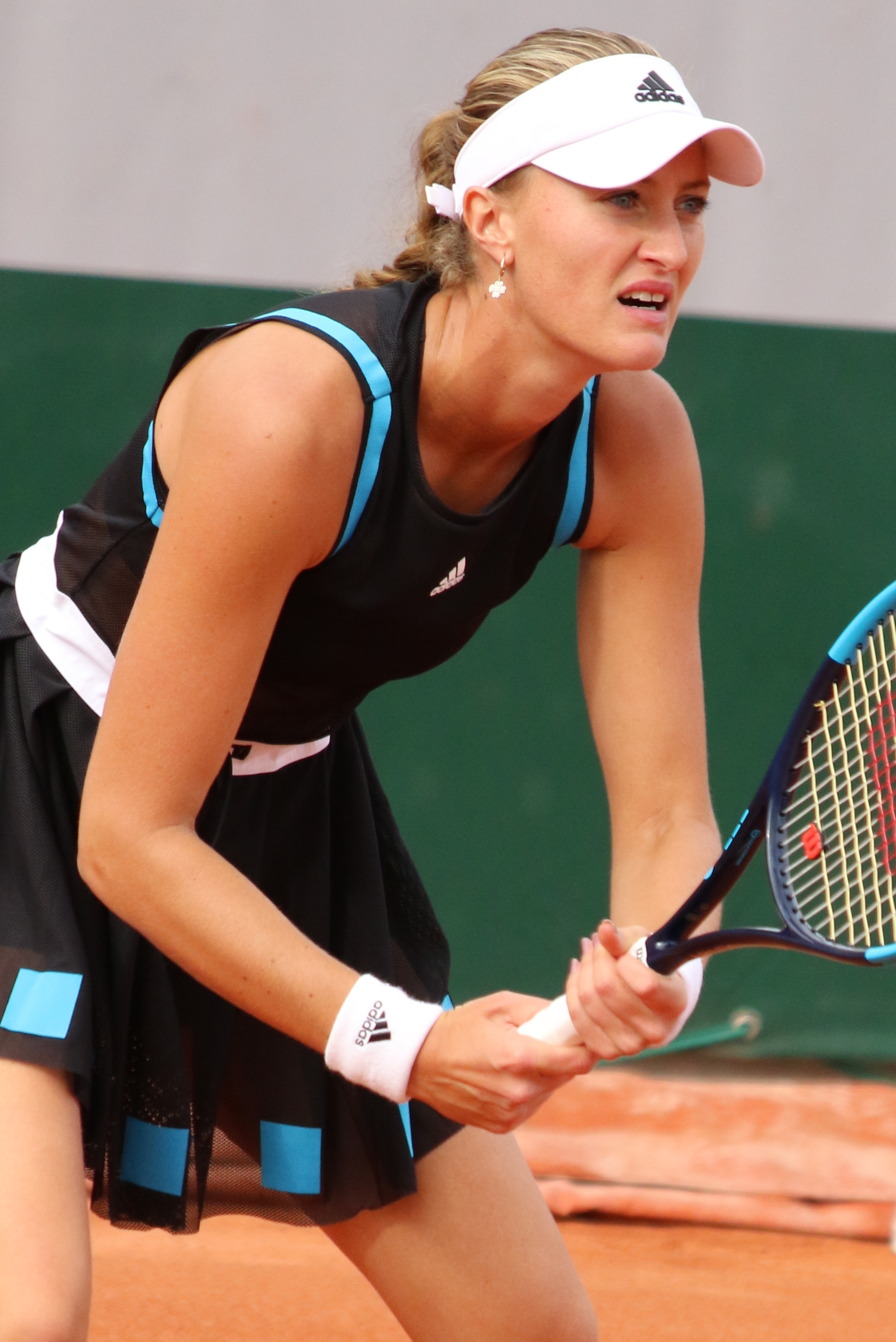
Mladenovic at the 2019 French Open

Mladenovic and Babos were the defending champions at the Australian Open where they lost in the final to Sam Stosur and Zhang Shuai.

In Dubai, Mladenovic defeated world No. 1, Naomi Osaka, in the second round but lost her next match to Carla Suárez Navarro. In April, Mladenovic played for France in the Fed Cup semifinals. She lost her match against Simona Halep. Then, in the deciding doubles rubber, Mladenovic and Garcia defeated Halep and Niculescu.

Mladenovic and Babos made the final of the French Open and in the process, Mladenovic became the number-one doubles player in the world. In the final, they defeated Duan Yingying and Zheng Saisai and won their third major title.

Mladenovic reached the second round of the Wimbledon singles, but lost to Petra Kvitová. At the US Open, she won her first-round match against three-time Grand Slam champion and 14th seed, Angelique Kerber.

In the 2019 Fed Cup final against Australia, Mladenovic was essential in France winning their first title since 2003, winning all three of her rubbers. First, she defeated Ajla Tomljanović 6–1, 6–1, and then upset world No. 1, Ashleigh Barty, in three sets. Finally, Mladenovic and Garcia defeated Barty and Stosur in the decisive doubles rubber, in two sets.

=== 2020–2021: Two major titles, back to world No. 1 in doubles ===
Mladenovic won two more Grand Slam doubles titles with Babos, at the 2020 Australian Open and as the defending champions at the 2020 French Open.

At the 2021 Australian Open, Mladenovic reached the third round in singles only for the second time at this major. She reached the final of the Italian Open, partnering with Czech player Markéta Vondroušová, defeating another Czech top-ten duo, second seeds Krejčíková/Siniaková, in the quarterfinals and multiple Grand Slam doubles winner and local favorite, Sara Errani and her partner Irina Begu, in the semifinals. With this successful run, Mladenovic regained her No. 1 doubles ranking. At the same tournament, she reached the second round in singles as a lucky loser defeating top-20 ranked Belinda Bencic to take revenge over her loss at the Madrid Open. She ended her 2021 season in early October citing physical and mental struggles.

=== 2022: Australian mixed doubles and French Open titles ===
Mladenovic, partnering Ivan Dodig, won the mixed doubles event at the Australian Open. It was her second career mixed-doubles title at this major having been crowned champion in 2014 with Daniel Nestor, and her eighth Grand Slam title overall.

At the French Open, she reached the final as a wildcard pair with compatriot Caroline Garcia, and won her fourth French Open title defeating Jessica Pegula and Coco Gauff. She teamed up with Kateřina Siniaková at the Jasmin Open to win her 28th doubles title in October.

Partnering Yanina Wickmayer, she defeated Asia Muhammad and Sabrina Santamaria to win the doubles title at the Korea Open.

=== 2023–2025: French Open wildcards in singles, US Open finalist in doubles ===
She received wildcards for the singles main draw at the 2023 French Open, and the 2024 French Open.

Partnering Zhang Shuai, she reached her third final in Flushing Meadows at the 2024 US Open defeating en route second seeds Hsieh Su-wei and Elise Mertens in the first round. They lost to Lyudmyla Kichenok and Jelena Ostapenko.

Playing with Veronika Erjavec, Mladenovic won the doubles title at the WTA 125 2024 Cali Open, defeating Tara Würth and Katarina Zavatska in the final.

=== 2026: Wimbledon champion ===
At the 2026 Wimbledon Championships, Mladenovic won her first doubles title at this event with Guo Hanyu, having reached the final in 2014, upsetting second seeds Gabriela Dabrowski and Luisa Stefani. It was Mladenovic's tenth Grand Slam title.

== Playing style ==
Mladenovic employs an all-court playing style, using variety along with her baseline play to win points. Her forehand is her strongest wing, and she is capable of hitting this shot both flat, and with topspin. Her backhand is also a solid shot, and she is capable of hitting her two-hander consistently and can hit backhand winners frequently; she does tend to utilise her sliced backhand more frequently to change the pace of the rally. She possesses a powerful serve, and her height of 1.84 m (6 ft 1/2 in) means that serve aces frequently; this is aided by the fact that her first serve peaks at 116 mph (187 km/h). However, her second serve is much weaker, and she can serve many double faults in a match; during her first round loss to Ekaterina Alexandrova at 2020 Palermo, Mladenovic served 20 double faults. Her doubles success in recent years has allowed her to develop a strong net game; she has begun to approach the net to finish points in singles more frequently due to her increased confidence. She uses her volleys, along with her backhand slice and drop shots, to create a lot of variety in her game. Her movement around the court is very good, considering her height and her footwork, but this can be exposed as a weakness when she needs to recover. Mladenovic's greatest weakness is her fragile mentality, as she finds it difficult to cope with pressure, committing myriad unforced errors, and can lose matches from winning positions – in her second round match at the 2020 US Open, she was leading by 6–1, 5–1 against Varvara Gracheva, holding four match points, before losing in three sets.

== Endorsements ==
Mladenovic wears Lululemon clothing (previously sponsored by Adidas) and uses Wilson rackets, specifically endorsing the Wilson Ultra range of racquets.

== Career statistics ==
=== Grand Slam performance timelines ===
Key
W	F	SF	QF	#R	RR	Q#	DNQ	A	NH

(W) winner; (F) finalist; (SF) semifinalist; (QF) quarterfinalist; (#R) rounds 4, 3, 2, 1; (RR) round-robin stage; (Q#) qualification round; (DNQ) did not qualify; (A) absent; (NH) not held; (SR) strike rate (events won / competed); (W–L) win–loss record.
To avoid confusion and double counting, these charts are updated at the conclusion of a tournament or when the player's participation has ended.

==== Singles ====
Tournament	2009	2010	2011	2012	2013	2014	2015	2016	2017	2018	2019	2020	2021	2022	2023	2024	2025	2026	SR	W–L	Win %
Australian Open	1R	Q3	Q1	Q2	2R	1R	2R	3R	1R	1R	1R	1R	3R	1R	Q3	A	Q2	Q2	0 / 11	6–11	35%
French Open	1R	1R	1R	1R	2R	3R	3R	3R	QF	1R	2R	1R	2R	1R	1R	1R	A	Q1	0 / 16	13–16	45%
Wimbledon	A	A	A	1R	1R	1R	3R	1R	2R	3R	2R	NH	1R	1R	Q1	Q1	A	A	0 / 10	6–10	38%
US Open	1R	A	Q2	3R	2R	1R	QF	2R	1R	2R	2R	2R	1R	Q1	Q1	Q2	A	Q1	0 / 11	11–11	50%
Win–Loss	0–3	0–1	0–1	2–3	3–4	2–4	9–4	5–4	5–4	3–4	3–4	1–3	3–4	0–3	0–1	0–1	0–0	0–0	0 / 48	36–48	43%

==== Doubles ====
Tournament	2008	2009	2010	2011	2012	2013	2014	2015	2016	2017	2018	2019	2020	2021	2022	2023	2024	2025	2026	SR	W–L	Win %
Australian Open	A	A	A	A	3R	1R	2R	2R	3R	SF	W	F	W	A	2R	2R	QF	QF	3R	2 / 14	37–12	76%
French Open	1R	1R	1R	2R	2R	QF	3R	2R	W	3R	QF	W	W	A	W	2R	A	A	QF	4 / 16	41–12	77%
Wimbledon	A	A	A	A	2R	2R	F	SF	QF	QF	QF	SF (Note: 3R w/o, not a win)	NH	1R	A	A	3R	A	W	1 / 11	31–10	76%
US Open	A	A	A	A	2R	3R	1R	3R	F	3R	F	QF	2R (Note: Babos and Mladenovic were forced to withdraw before second-round match due to Mladenovic being in contact with Benoît Paire who was tested positive for COVID-19, despite Mladenovic being tested negative multiple times. Their walkover in the second round is not counted as loss.) (Note: Babos and Mladenovic were forced to withdraw before second-round match due to Mladenovic being in contact with Benoît Paire who was tested positive for COVID-19, despite Mladenovic being tested negative multiple times. Their walkover in the second round is not counted as loss.)	A	QF	A	F	A	1R	0 / 12	29–11	73%
Win–loss	0–1	0–1	0–1	1–1	5–4	6–4	8–4	8–4	16–3	11–4	17–3	17–3	13–0	0–1	10–2	2–2	10–3	3–1	11–3	7 / 53	138–45	75%

==== Mixed doubles ====
Tournament	2010	...	2013	2014	2015	2016	2017	2018	2019	2020	2021	2022	2023	2024	2025	2026	SR	W–L	Win%
Australian Open	A		A	W	F	A	A	A	2R	A	A	W	2R	A	1R	F	2 / 7	20–5	80%
French Open	1R		F	QF	2R	SF	A	2R	A	NH	A	A	A	A	A	2R	0 / 7	12–7	63%
Wimbledon	A		W	SF	QF	A	A	A	A	NH	A	A	A	A	A	1R	1 / 4	10–3	77%
US Open	A		SF	1R	A	A	A	A	A	NH	A	1R	A	A	A	1R	0 / 4	3–4	43%
Win–Loss	0–1		12–2	10–3	7–3	3–1	0–0	1–1	1–1	0–0	0–0	5–1	1–1	0–0	0–1	5–4	3 / 22	45–19	70%

=== Grand Slam tournament finals ===
==== Doubles: 12 (7 titles, 5 runner-ups) ====
Result	Year	Championship	Surface	Partner	Opponents	Score
Loss	2014	Wimbledon	Grass	(Hungary) Tímea Babos	(Italy) Sara Errani (Italy) Roberta Vinci	1–6, 3–6
Win	2016	French Open	Clay	(France) Caroline Garcia	(Russia) Ekaterina Makarova (Russia) Elena Vesnina	6–3, 2–6, 6–4
Loss	2016	US Open	Hard	(France) Caroline Garcia	(United States) Bethanie Mattek-Sands (Czech Republic) Lucie Šafářová	6–2, 6–7^{(5–7)}, 4–6
Win	2018	Australian Open	Hard	(Hungary) Tímea Babos	(Russia) Ekaterina Makarova (Russia) Elena Vesnina	6–4, 6–3
Loss	2018	US Open	Hard	(Hungary) Tímea Babos	(Australia) Ashleigh Barty (United States) CoCo Vandeweghe	6–3, 6–7^{(2–7)}, 6–7^{(6–8)}
Loss	2019	Australian Open	Hard	(Hungary) Tímea Babos	(Australia) Samantha Stosur (China) Zhang Shuai	3–6, 4–6
Win	2019	French Open (2)	Clay	(Hungary) Tímea Babos	(China) Duan Yingying (China) Zheng Saisai	6–2, 6–3
Win	2020	Australian Open (2)	Hard	(Hungary) Tímea Babos	(Chinese Taipei) Hsieh Su-wei (Czech Republic) Barbora Strýcová	6–2, 6–1
Win	2020	French Open (3)	Clay	(Hungary) Tímea Babos	(Chile) Alexa Guarachi (United States) Desirae Krawczyk	6–4, 7–5
Win	2022	French Open (4)	Clay	(France) Caroline Garcia	(United States) Coco Gauff (United States) Jessica Pegula	2–6, 6–3, 6–2
Loss	2024	US Open	Hard	(China) Zhang Shuai	(Latvia) Jeļena Ostapenko (Ukraine) Lyudmyla Kichenok	4–6, 3–6
Win	2026	Wimbledon	Grass	(China) Guo Hanyu	(Canada) Gabriela Dabrowski (Brazil) Luisa Stefani	6–3, 7–5

==== Mixed doubles: 6 (3 titles, 3 runner-ups) ====
Result	Year	Championship	Surface	Partner	Opponents	Score
Loss	2013	French Open	Clay	(Canada) Daniel Nestor	(Czech Republic) Lucie Hradecká; (Czech Republic) František Čermák	6–1, 4–6, [6–10]
Win	2013	Wimbledon	Grass	(Canada) Daniel Nestor	(Brazil) Bruno Soares; (United States) Lisa Raymond	5–7, 6–2, 8–6
Win	2014	Australian Open	Hard	(Canada) Daniel Nestor	(India) Sania Mirza; (Romania) Horia Tecău	6–3, 6–2
Loss	2015	Australian Open	Hard	(Canada) Daniel Nestor	(Switzerland) Martina Hingis; (India) Leander Paes	4–6, 3–6
Win	2022	Australian Open (2)	Hard	(Croatia) Ivan Dodig	(Australia) Jaimee Fourlis (Australia) Jason Kubler	6–3, 6–4
Loss	2026	Australian Open	Hard	(France) Manuel Guinard	(Australia) Olivia Gadecki (Australia) John Peers	6–4, 3–6, [8–10]

== Notes ==
Awards
Preceded by (Thailand) Noppawan Lertcheewakarn	ITF Junior World Champion; 2009	Succeeded by (Russia) Daria Gavrilova
Preceded by (Switzerland) Martina Hingis & (India) Sania Mirza	WTA Doubles Team of the Year (with (France) Caroline Garcia); 2016	Succeeded by (Switzerland) Martina Hingis & (Chinese Taipei) Chan Yung-jan
Preceded by (Switzerland) Martina Hingis & (India) Sania Mirza	ITF Doubles World Champion (with (France) Caroline Garcia); 2016 WTA Tour	Succeeded by (Switzerland) Martina Hingis & (Chinese Taipei) Chan Yung-jan
