= 2019 Bucharest Open – Singles =

Singles
- 2019 Bucharest Open

Final
- Champion: (Kazakhstan) Elena Rybakina
- Runner-up: (Romania) Patricia Maria Tig
- Score: 6–2, 6–0

Details
- Draw: 32
- Seeds: 8

Events
Singles	Doubles
- Bucharest Open

Anastasija Sevastova was the defending champion, but lost in the second round to Patricia Maria Țig.

Elena Rybakina won her first WTA Tour title, defeating Țig in the final, 6–2, 6–0.

== Seeds ==
1. (Latvia) Anastasija Sevastova (second round)
2. (Slovakia) Viktória Kužmová (quarterfinals)
3. (Russia) Veronika Kudermetova (second round, retired)
4. (Slovenia) Tamara Zidanšek (withdrew)
5. (Romania) Sorana Cîrstea (first round)
6. (Germany) Laura Siegemund (semifinals)
7. (Spain) Aliona Bolsova (second round, retired)
8. (Czech Republic) Kristýna Plíšková (quarterfinals)

== Draw ==
Key

- Q = Qualifier
- WC = Wild card
- LL = Lucky loser
- Alt = Alternate
- ITF = ITF entry
- PR = Protected ranking
- SR = Special ranking
- SE = Special exempt
- JE = Junior exempt
- JR = Junior Accelerator Programme entrant
- CO = College Accelerator Programme entrant
- NG = Next Gen Accelerator Program entrant
- w/o = Walkover
- r = Retired
- d = Defaulted

=== Finals ===
Semifinals
Q	(Romania) Patricia Maria Țig	6	6
6	(Germany) Laura Siegemund	3	1
Q	(Italy) Martina Di Giuseppe	3	2
(Kazakhstan) Elena Rybakina	6	6

Final
Q	(Romania) Patricia Maria Țig	2	0
(Kazakhstan) Elena Rybakina	6	6

=== Top half ===
First round
1	(Latvia) A Sevastova	5	7^{7}	7
(Romania) A Bogdan	7	6^{4}	5
LL	(Hungary) A Bondár	2	1
Q	(Romania) PM Țig	6	6
LL	(Croatia) T Mrdeža	3	5
(Belgium) Y Bonaventure	6	7
LL	(Romania) A Cadanțu	5	1
8	(Czech Republic) Kr Plíšková	7	6
LL	(Bulgaria) I Shinikova	7	1	1
(Slovenia) K Juvan	5	6	6
(Romania) I-C Begu	7	6
(Serbia) A Krunić	5	1
Q	(China) S Xu	5	7^{9}	5
(Spain) L Arruabarrena	7	6^{7}	7
(Ukraine) A Kalinina	6	3	4
6	(Germany) L Siegemund	4	6	6

Second round
1	(Latvia) A Sevastova	2	5
Q	(Romania) PM Țig	6	7
(Belgium) Y Bonaventure	0	2
8	(Czech Republic) Kr Plíšková	6	6
(Slovenia) K Juvan	4	3
(Romania) I-C Begu	6	6
(Spain) L Arruabarrena	5	3
6	(Germany) L Siegemund	7	6

Quarterfinals
Q	(Romania) PM Țig	6	3	6
8	(Czech Republic) Kr Plíšková	3	6	3
(Romania) I-C Begu	5	2
6	(Germany) L Siegemund	7	6

Semifinals
Q	(Romania) PM Țig	6	6
6	(Germany) L Siegemund	3	1

=== Bottom half ===
First round
7	(Spain) A Bolsova	6	6
(Russia) V Flink	3	2
WC	(Romania) E-G Ruse	3	6	2
(Czech Republic) B Krejčíková	6	0	6
(United States) V Lepchenko	6	1	6^{3}
Q	(Italy) M Di Giuseppe	3	6	7^{7}
(Netherlands) A Rus	2	4
3	(Russia) V Kudermetova	6	6
5	(Romania) S Cîrstea	4	6	2
WC	(Romania) J Cristian	6	4	6
(Spain) P Badosa	5	6^{4}
(Kazakhstan) E Rybakina	7	7^{7}
Q	(Australia) J Fourlis	6	7^{8}
WC	(Romania) I Bara	3	6^{6}
(Slovenia) D Jakupović	2	2
2	(Slovakia) V Kužmová	6	6

Second round
7	(Spain) A Bolsova	0	2^{r}
(Czech Republic) B Krejčíková	6	3
Q	(Italy) M Di Giuseppe	2	5
3	(Russia) V Kudermetova	6	4^{r}
WC	(Romania) J Cristian	1	0
(Kazakhstan) E Rybakina	6	6
Q	(Australia) J Fourlis	5	2
2	(Slovakia) V Kužmová	7	6

Quarterfinals
(Czech Republic) B Krejčíková	4	4
Q	(Italy) M Di Giuseppe	6	6
(Kazakhstan) E Rybakina	7^{7}	6
2	(Slovakia) V Kužmová	6^{4}	3

Semifinals
Q	(Italy) M Di Giuseppe	3	2
(Kazakhstan) E Rybakina	6	6

== Qualifying ==
=== Seeds ===
1. (Czech Republic) Tereza Martincová (first round, retired)
2. (Georgia (country)) Ekaterine Gorgodze (first round)
3. (Hungary) Anna Bondár (qualifying competition, lucky loser)
4. (Croatia) Tereza Mrdeža (qualifying competition, lucky loser)
5. (Germany) Anna Zaja (first round, retired)
6. (Romania) Alexandra Cadanțu (qualifying competition, lucky loser)
7. (Italy) Martina Di Giuseppe (qualified)
8. (Turkey) Başak Eraydın (second round)

=== Qualifiers ===
1. (Romania) Patricia Maria Țig
2. (China) Xu Shilin
3. (Italy) Martina Di Giuseppe
4. (Australia) Jaimee Fourlis

=== Lucky losers ===
1. (Hungary) Anna Bondár
2. (Croatia) Tereza Mrdeža
3. (Romania) Alexandra Cadanțu
4. (Bulgaria) Isabella Shinikova

=== Draw ===
==== First qualifier ====
First round
1	(Czech Republic) Tereza Martincová	6	6^{5}	3^{r}
(Italy) Sara Errani	1	7^{7}	3
(Italy) Anastasia Grymalska	4	2
(Bulgaria) Isabella Shinikova	6	6
WC	(Romania) Patricia Maria Țig	6	6
WC	(Romania) Oana Georgeta Simion	4	4
(Russia) Marina Melnikova	6	0
5	(Germany) Anna Zaja	3	0^{r}

Second round
(Italy) Sara Errani	3	7^{7}	3
(Bulgaria) Isabella Shinikova	6	6^{4}	6
WC	(Romania) Patricia Maria Țig	5	6	6
(Russia) Marina Melnikova	7	1	1

Qualifying competition
(Bulgaria) Isabella Shinikova	3	2
WC	(Romania) Patricia Maria Țig	6	6

==== Second qualifier ====
First round
2	(Georgia (country)) Ekaterine Gorgodze	4	3
(Romania) Cristina Dinu	6	6
(United Kingdom) Naiktha Bains	5	6	5
(China) Xu Shilin	7	2	7
(Romania) Nicoleta Dascălu	6	6
(Germany) Jasmin Jebawy	0	4
(Romania) Irina Fetecău	6	3	3
6	(Romania) Alexandra Cadanțu	1	6	6

Second round
(Romania) Cristina Dinu	3	3
(China) Xu Shilin	6	6
(Romania) Nicoleta Dascălu	7^{7}	6^{8}	6^{4}
6	(Romania) Alexandra Cadanțu	6^{3}	7^{10}	7^{7}

Qualifying competition
(China) Xu Shilin	5	6	6
6	(Romania) Alexandra Cadanțu	7	0	2

==== Third qualifier ====
First round
3	(Hungary) Anna Bondár	6	6
(Romania) Laura Ioana Paar	2	2
WC	(Hungary) Fanni Gécsek	0	2
(Belgium) Marie Benoît	6	6
(Russia) Sofya Lansere	6	3	4
(Chile) Daniela Seguel	3	6	6
(United Kingdom) Francesca Jones	3	4
7	(Italy) Martina Di Giuseppe	6	6

Second round
3	(Hungary) Anna Bondár	7^{9}	0	7^{7}
(Belgium) Marie Benoît	6^{7}	6	6^{5}
(Chile) Daniela Seguel	0	3
7	(Italy) Martina Di Giuseppe	6	6

Qualifying competition
3	(Hungary) Anna Bondár	3	4
7	(Italy) Martina Di Giuseppe	6	6

==== Fourth qualifier ====
First round
4	(Croatia) Tereza Mrdeža	6	6
WC	(Hungary) Ágnes Bukta	1	2
(Cyprus) Raluka Șerban	7^{7}	6^{4}	6^{3}
(Romania) Miriam Bulgaru	6^{5}	7^{7}	7^{7}
(Australia) Jaimee Fourlis	6	6
(Romania) Gabriela Talabă	4	2
(United States) Louisa Chirico	2	2
8	(Turkey) Başak Eraydın	6	6

Second round
4	(Croatia) Tereza Mrdeža	6	6
(Romania) Miriam Bulgaru	3	3
(Australia) Jaimee Fourlis	7	6
8	(Turkey) Başak Eraydın	5	3

Qualifying competition
4	(Croatia) Tereza Mrdeža	3	6	2
(Australia) Jaimee Fourlis	6	4	6
