= 2019 Bucharest Open =

- Date: 15–21 July
- Edition: 6th
- Category: WTA International
- Draw: 32S / 16D
- Prize money: $250,000
- Surface: Clay
- Location: Bucharest, Romania
- Venue: Arenele BNR

Champions

Singles
- (Kazakhstan) Elena Rybakina

Doubles
- (Slovakia) Viktória Kužmová / (Czech Republic) Kristýna Plíšková
- Bucharest Open

The 2019 BRD Bucharest Open was a women's professional tennis tournament played on outdoor clay courts. It was the sixth and last edition of the tournament and part of the International category of the 2019 WTA Tour. It was held from 15 July until 21 July 2019 at the Arenele BNR in Bucharest, Romania. Unseeded Elena Rybakina won the singles title.

== Finals ==
=== Singles ===
- (Kazakhstan) Elena Rybakina defeated (Romania) Patricia Maria Tig, 6–2, 6–0

=== Doubles ===
- (Slovakia) Viktória Kužmová / (Czech Republic) Kristýna Plíšková defeated (Romania) Jaqueline Cristian / (Romania) Elena-Gabriela Ruse, 6–4, 7–6^{(7–3)}

== Points and prize money ==
=== Point distribution ===
Event	W	F	SF	QF	Round of 16	Round of 32	Q	Q3	Q2	Q1
Singles	280	180	110	60	30	1	18	14	10	1
Doubles	280	180	110	60	1	—N/a	—N/a	—N/a	—N/a	—N/a

=== Prize money ===
Event	W	F	SF	QF	Round of 16	Round of 32	Q3	Q2	Q1
Singles	$43,000	$21,400	$11,300	$5,900	$3,310	$1,925	$1,005	$730	$530
Doubles	$12,300	$6,400	$3,435	$1,820	$960	—N/a	—N/a	—N/a	

== Singles main-draw entrants ==
=== Seeds ===
Country	Player	Rank^{1}	Seed
LAT	Anastasija Sevastova	12	1
SVK	Viktória Kužmová	47	2
RUS	Veronika Kudermetova	59	3
~~SLO~~	~~Tamara Zidanšek~~	~~61~~	~~4~~
ROU	Sorana Cîrstea	77	5
GER	Laura Siegemund	82	6
ESP	Aliona Bolsova	92	7
CZE	Kristýna Plíšková	94	8

- ^{1} Rankings as of 1 July 2019.

=== Other entrants ===
The following players received wildcards into the singles main draw:

- (Romania) Irina Bara
- (Romania) Jaqueline Cristian
- (Romania) Elena-Gabriela Ruse

The following player received entry using a protected ranking into the singles main draw:

- ~~(United States) Bethanie Mattek-Sands~~

The following players received entry from the qualifying draw:

- (Italy) Martina Di Giuseppe
- (Australia) Jaimee Fourlis
- (Romania) Patricia Maria Țig
- (China) Xu Shilin

The following players received entry as lucky losers:

- (Hungary) Anna Bondár
- (Romania) Alexandra Cadanțu
- (Croatia) Tereza Mrdeža
- (Bulgaria) Isabella Shinikova

=== Withdrawals ===
- (Russia) Margarita Gasparyan → replaced by (Slovenia) Kaja Juvan
- (Slovenia) Polona Hercog → replaced by (Hungary) Anna Bondár
- (Serbia) Ivana Jorović → replaced by (Bulgaria) Isabella Shinikova
- (Estonia) Kaia Kanepi → replaced by (Spain) Aliona Bolsova
- (United States) Bethanie Mattek-Sands → replaced by (Croatia) Tereza Mrdeža
- (Kazakhstan) Yulia Putintseva → replaced by (Czech Republic) Barbora Krejčíková
- (Slovakia) Anna Karolína Schmiedlová → replaced by (Spain) Paula Badosa
- (Czech Republic) Tereza Smitková → replaced by (Russia) Varvara Flink
- (Spain) Sara Sorribes Tormo → replaced by (Kazakhstan) Elena Rybakina
- (Belgium) Alison Van Uytvanck → replaced by (United States) Varvara Lepchenko
- (Slovenia) Tamara Zidanšek → replaced by (Romania) Alexandra Cadanțu

=== Retirements ===
- (Spain) Aliona Bolsova (right ankle injury)
- (Russia) Veronika Kudermetova (right ankle injury)

== WTA doubles main-draw entrants ==
=== Seeds ===
Country	Player	Country	Player	Rank^{1}	Seed
ROU	Irina-Camelia Begu	ROU	Raluca Olaru	80	1
~~SRB~~	~~Aleksandra Krunić~~	~~USA~~	~~Bethanie Mattek-Sands~~	~~134~~	~~2~~
ESP	Lara Arruabarrena	ROU	Andreea Mitu	145	3
SVK	Viktória Kužmová	CZE	Kristýna Plíšková	191	4

- Rankings are as of July 1, 2019

=== Other entrants ===
The following pairs received wildcards into the doubles main draw:

- (Romania) Irina Bara / (Romania) Patricia Maria Țig
- (Romania) Georgia Crăciun / (Romania) Irina Fetecău

The following pair received entry as alternates:

- (Romania) Elena Bogdan / (Romania) Alexandra Cadanțu

=== Withdrawals ===
Before the tournament

- (Serbia) Ivana Jorović (right elbow injury)
- (United States) Bethanie Mattek-Sands (knee pain)

During the tournament

- (Spain) Aliona Bolsova (right ankle injury)
- (Romania) Patricia Maria Țig (left wrist injury)
