= 2019 Bucharest Open – Doubles =

Doubles
- 2019 Bucharest Open

Final
- Champions: (Slovakia) Viktória Kužmová (Czech Republic) Kristýna Plíšková
- Runners-up: (Romania) Jaqueline Cristian (Romania) Elena-Gabriela Ruse
- Score: 6–4, 7–6^{(7–3)}

Details
- Draw: 16
- Seeds: 4

Events
Singles	Doubles
- Bucharest Open

Irina-Camelia Begu and Andreea Mitu were the defending champions, but chose to participate with different partners. Begu played alongside Raluca Olaru, while Mitu teamed up with Lara Arruabarrena. Both teams lost to Jaqueline Cristian and Elena-Gabriela Ruse in the semifinals and quarterfinals, respectively.

Viktória Kužmová and Kristýna Plíšková won the title, defeating Cristian and Ruse in the final, 6–4, 7–6^{(7–3)}.

== Seeds ==
1. (Romania) Irina-Camelia Begu / (Romania) Raluca Olaru (semifinals)
2. (Serbia) Aleksandra Krunić / (United States) Bethanie Mattek-Sands (withdrew)
3. (Spain) Lara Arruabarrena / (Romania) Andreea Mitu (quarterfinals)
4. (Slovakia) Viktória Kužmová / (Czech Republic) Kristýna Plíšková (champions)

== Draw ==
Key

- Q = Qualifier
- WC = Wild card
- LL = Lucky loser
- Alt = Alternate
- ITF = ITF entry
- PR = Protected ranking
- SR = Special ranking
- SE = Special exempt
- JE = Junior exempt
- JR = Junior Accelerator Programme entrant
- CO = College Accelerator Programme entrant
- NG = Next Gen Accelerator Program entrant
- w/o = Walkover
- r = Retired
- d = Defaulted

=== Draw ===
First round
1	(Romania) I-C Begu (Romania) R Olaru	6	6
(Italy) G Marchetti (Brazil) L Pigossi	4	2
WC	(Romania) I Bara (Romania) PM Țig	6	7
(Spain) C Bucșa (India) P Thombare	2	5
3	(Spain) L Arruabarrena (Romania) A Mitu	7^{8}	6
WC	(Romania) G Crăciun (Romania) I Fetecău	6^{6}	3
Alt	(Romania) E Bogdan (Romania) A Cadanțu	4	3
(Romania) J Cristian (Romania) E-G Ruse	6	6
(Canada) S Fichman (Serbia) N Stojanović	6^{6}	6	[10]
(Belgium) M Benoît (Belgium) Y Bonaventure	7^{8}	2	[4]
(United Kingdom) N Bains (Italy) A Grymalska	6	3	[7]
4	(Slovakia) V Kužmová (Czech Republic) Kr Plíšková	4	6	[10]
(Uzbekistan) A Amanmuradova (Romania) C Dinu	6	6^{4}	[9]
(Spain) A Bolsova (Croatia) T Mrdeža	2	7^{7}	[11]
(Romania) A Bogdan (Bulgaria) I Shinikova	w/o
2	(Serbia) A Krunić (United States) B Mattek-Sands

Quarterfinals
1	(Romania) I-C Begu (Romania) R Olaru	w/o
WC	(Romania) I Bara (Romania) PM Țig
3	(Spain) L Arruabarrena (Romania) A Mitu	3	6	[11]
(Romania) J Cristian (Romania) E-G Ruse	6	1	[13]
(Canada) S Fichman (Serbia) N Stojanović	6	6^{3}	[6]
4	(Slovakia) V Kužmová (Czech Republic) Kr Plíšková	3	7^{7}	[10]
(Spain) A Bolsova (Croatia) T Mrdeža	2	7^{7}	[10]
(Romania) A Bogdan (Bulgaria) I Shinikova	6	6^{3}	[7]

Semifinals
1	(Romania) I-C Begu (Romania) R Olaru	6	3	[7]
(Romania) J Cristian (Romania) E-G Ruse	3	6	[10]
4	(Slovakia) V Kužmová (Czech Republic) Kr Plíšková	w/o
(Spain) A Bolsova (Croatia) T Mrdeža

Final
(Romania) J Cristian (Romania) E-G Ruse	4	6^{3}
4	(Slovakia) V Kužmová (Czech Republic) Kr Plíšková	6	7^{7}
