= 2019 St. Petersburg Ladies' Trophy – Doubles =

Doubles
- 2019 St. Petersburg Ladies' Trophy

Final
- Champions: (Russia) Margarita Gasparyan (Russia) Ekaterina Makarova
- Runners-up: (Russia) Anna Kalinskaya (Slovakia) Viktória Kužmová
- Score: 7–5, 7–5

Events
Singles	Doubles
← 2018 ·	St. Petersburg Ladies' Trophy	· 2020 →

Timea Bacsinszky and Vera Zvonareva were the defending champions but lost in the first round to Anna Kalinskaya and Viktória Kužmová.

Margarita Gasparyan and Ekaterina Makarova won the title, defeating Kalinskaya and Kužmová in the final, 7–5, 7–5.

== Seeds ==
1. (United States) Raquel Atawo / (Slovenia) Katarina Srebotnik (first round)
2. (France) Kristina Mladenovic / (Kazakhstan) Galina Voskoboeva (first round)
3. (Japan) Shuko Aoyama / (Belarus) Lidziya Marozava (first round)
4. (Switzerland) Timea Bacsinszky / (Russia) Vera Zvonareva (first round)

== Draw ==
=== Key ===
- Q = Qualifier
- WC = Wild card
- LL = Lucky loser
- Alt = Alternate
- SE = Special exempt
- PR = Protected ranking
- ITF = ITF entry
- JE = Junior exempt
- w/o = Walkover
- r = Retired
- d = Defaulted
- SR = Special ranking

=== Draw ===
First round
1	(United States) R Atawo (Slovenia) K Srebotnik	6^{9}	6^{1}
(Russia) V Kudermetova (Belarus) V Lapko	7^{11}	7^{7}
(Belgium) K Flipkens (Belgium) A Van Uytvanck	6	5	[10]
(Poland) P Kania (Russia) Y Sizikova	3	7	[7]
4	(Switzerland) T Bacsinszky (Russia) V Zvonareva	1	3
(Russia) A Kalinskaya (Slovakia) V Kužmová	6	6
(Australia) M Adamczak (Australia) J Moore	2	4
WC	(Russia) D Mishina (Russia) E Shalimova	6	6
(Russia) M Gasparyan (Russia) E Makarova	6	2	[10]
(Belarus) V Azarenka (Australia) D Gavrilova	1	6	[8]
(Serbia) O Danilović (Serbia) A Krunić	6	6
3	(Japan) S Aoyama (Belarus) L Marozava	4	4
(Latvia) J Ostapenko (Czech Republic) R Voráčová	6^{4}	2
(Romania) A Mitu (Romania) R Olaru	7^{7}	6
(Spain) L Arruabarrena (Russia) A Panova	6	4	[10]
2	(France) K Mladenovic (Kazakhstan) G Voskoboeva	3	6	[7]

Quarterfinals
(Russia) V Kudermetova (Belarus) V Lapko	6	1	[3]
(Belgium) K Flipkens (Belgium) A Van Uytvanck	4	6	[10]
(Russia) A Kalinskaya (Slovakia) V Kužmová	6	6
WC	(Russia) D Mishina (Russia) E Shalimova	0	3
(Russia) M Gasparyan (Russia) E Makarova	7	6
(Serbia) O Danilović (Serbia) A Krunić	5	1
(Romania) A Mitu (Romania) R Olaru	5	6	[10]
(Spain) L Arruabarrena (Russia) A Panova	7	4	[12]

Semifinals
(Belgium) K Flipkens (Belgium) A Van Uytvanck	4	6	[7]
(Russia) A Kalinskaya (Slovakia) V Kužmová	6	2	[10]
(Russia) M Gasparyan (Russia) E Makarova	6	6
(Spain) L Arruabarrena (Russia) A Panova	0	2

Final
(Russia) A Kalinskaya (Slovakia) V Kužmová	5	5
(Russia) M Gasparyan (Russia) E Makarova	7	7
