= Bucharest Open =

BRD Bucharest Open

Defunct tennis tournament
- Founded: 2014; 12 years ago
- Editions: 5 (2018)
- Location: Bucharest; Romania
- Venue: Arenele BNR
- Category: WTA International
- Surface: Clay (red) - outdoors
- Draw: 32S / 32Q / 16D
- Prize money: US$250,000 (2019)
- Website: brdbucharestopen.ro

Current champions (2019)
- Women's singles: (Kazakhstan) Elena Rybakina
- Women's doubles: (Slovakia) Viktória Kužmová (Czech Republic) Kristýna Plíšková

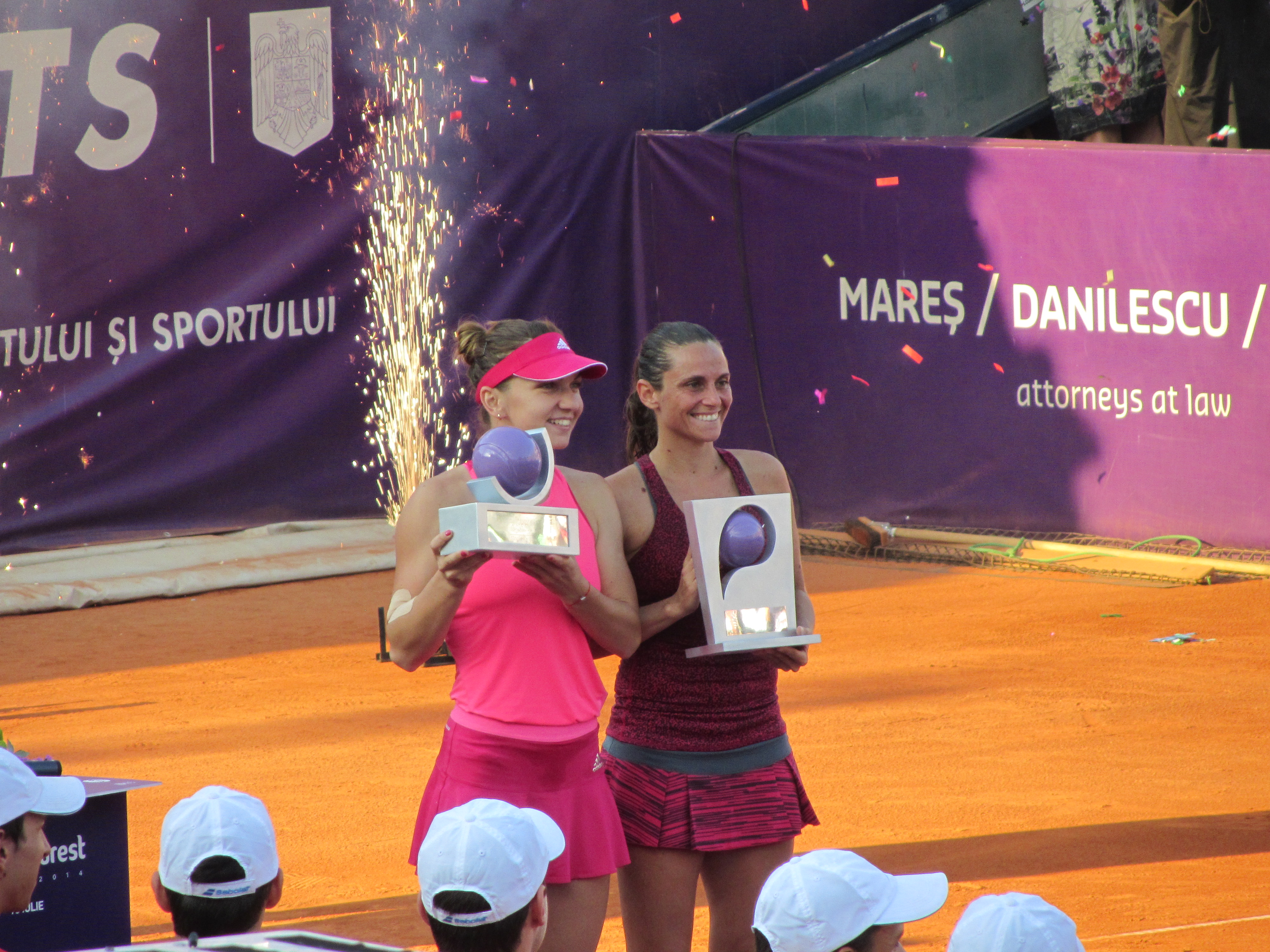
Simona Halep won in 2014 the first edition of the event held in Bucharest, and would win the tournament once again in 2016

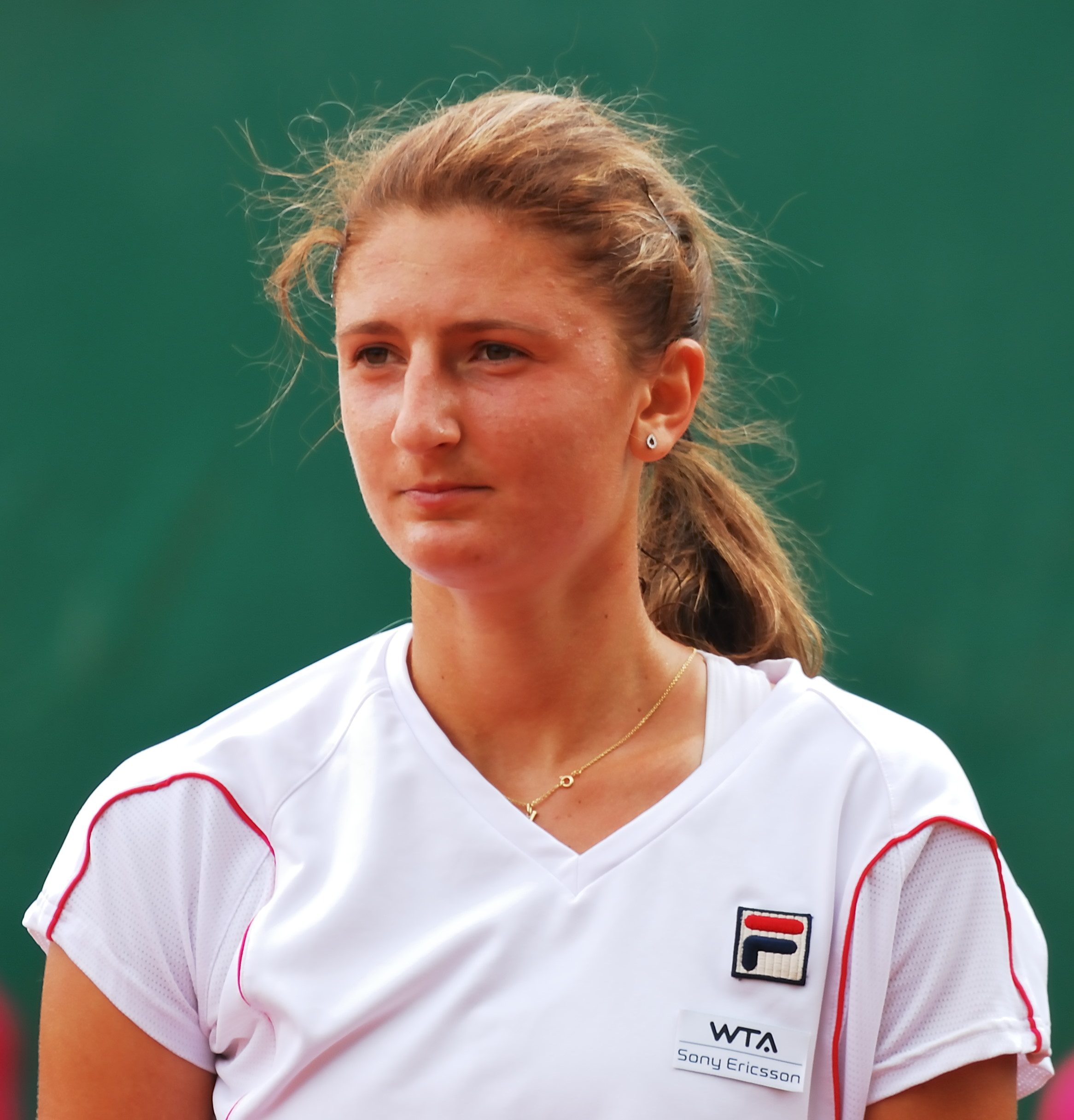
Irina-Camelia Begu won singles and doubles titles in Bucharest

The Bucharest Open established in 2014 was a professional tennis tournament played on outdoor clay courts in Bucharest, Romania. It was part of the Women's Tennis Association (WTA) Tour. It was held annually in July at the Arenele BNR the week after the Wimbledon.

== Past finals ==
=== Singles ===
Year	Champions	Runners-up	Score
2014	(Romania) Simona Halep	(Italy) Roberta Vinci	6–1, 6–3
2015	(Slovakia) Anna Karolína Schmiedlová	(Italy) Sara Errani	7–6^{(7–3)}, 6–3
2016	(Romania) Simona Halep (2)	(Latvia) Anastasija Sevastova	6–0, 6–0
2017	(Romania) Irina-Camelia Begu	(Germany) Julia Görges	6–3, 7–5
2018	(Latvia) Anastasija Sevastova	(Croatia) Petra Martić	7–6^{(7–4)}, 6–2
2019	(Kazakhstan) Elena Rybakina	(Romania) Patricia Maria Țig	6–2, 6–0

=== Doubles ===
Year	Champions	Runners-up	Score
2014	(Romania) Elena Bogdan (Romania) Alexandra Cadanțu	(Turkey) Çağla Büyükakçay (Italy) Karin Knapp	6–4, 3–6, [10–5]
2015	(Georgia (country)) Oksana Kalashnikova (Netherlands) Demi Schuurs	(Romania) Andreea Mitu (Romania) Patricia Maria Țig	6–2, 6–2
2016	(Australia) Jessica Moore (Thailand) Varatchaya Wongteanchai	(Romania) Alexandra Cadanțu (Poland) Katarzyna Piter	6–3, 7–6^{(7–5)}
2017	(Romania) Irina-Camelia Begu (Romania) Raluca Olaru	(Belgium) Elise Mertens (Netherlands) Demi Schuurs	6–3, 6–3
2018	(Romania) Irina-Camelia Begu (2) (Romania) Andreea Mitu	(Montenegro) Danka Kovinić (Belgium) Maryna Zanevska	6–3, 6–4
2019	(Slovakia) Viktória Kužmová (Czech Republic) Kristýna Plíšková	(Romania) Jaqueline Cristian (Romania) Elena-Gabriela Ruse	6–4, 7–6^{(7–3)}

== See also ==
- BRD Năstase Țiriac Trophy
