= Viktória Hrunčáková =

Slovak tennis player (born 1998)

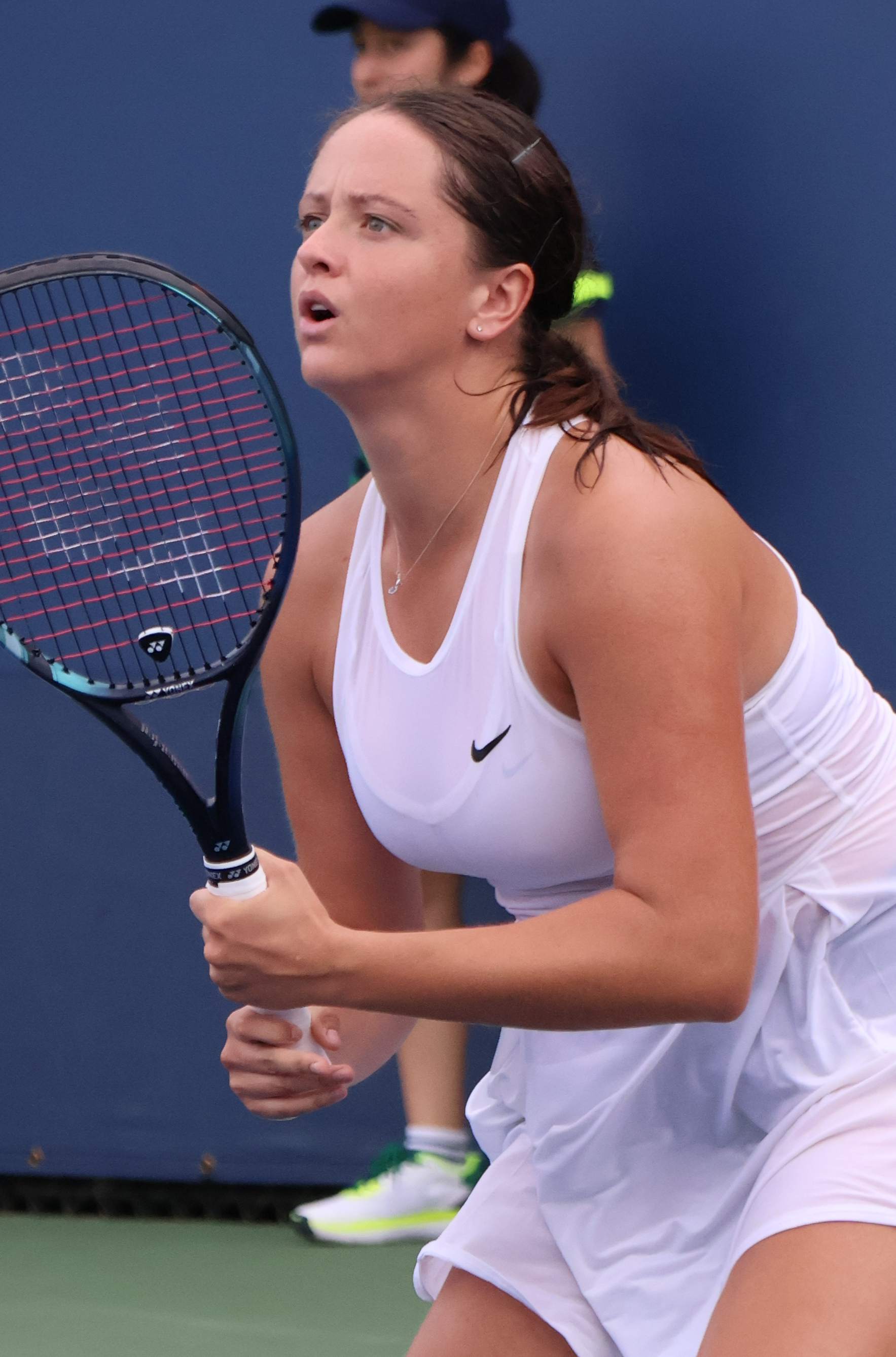
- Hrunčáková at the 2023 US Open
- Country (sports): Slovakia
- Residence: Košice, Slovakia
- Born: 11 May 1998 (age 28) Košice
- Height: 1.80 m (5 ft 11 in)
- Turned pro: 2014
- Plays: Right-handed (two-handed backhand)
- Coach: Ján Sabovčík (–2018), Michal Mertiňák (2018–2020), Tomáš Hrunčák (2020-present)
- Prize money: US$ 2,844,715

Singles
- Career record: 432–260
- Career titles: 17 ITF
- Highest ranking: No. 43 (4 March 2019)
- Current ranking: No. 227 (15 June 2026)

Grand Slam singles results
- Australian Open: 2R (2019)
- French Open: 3R (2019)
- Wimbledon: 1R (2018, 2019, 2023)
- US Open: 2R (2022)

Doubles
- Career record: 167–108
- Career titles: 5 WTA 250, 9 ITF
- Highest ranking: No. 27 (8 March 2021)
- Current ranking: No. 440 (27 October 2025)

Grand Slam doubles results
- Australian Open: 3R (2020, 2021, 2022)
- French Open: 3R (2020)
- Wimbledon: 3R (2021, 2023)
- US Open: SF (2019)

Team competitions
- Fed Cup: F (2024); Record 18–10
Medal record
Women's tennis
Representing Slovakia
European Youth Summer Olympic Festival
| Gold medal – first place | 2013 Utrecht | Girls' singles |
| Gold medal – first place | 2013 Utrecht | Girls' doubles |
- Last updated on: 31 October 2025.

Viktória Hrunčáková (née Kužmová; born 11 May 1998) is a Slovak professional tennis player. She has been ranked as high as No. 43 in singles and No. 27 in doubles in the world by the WTA. Hrunčáková has won five doubles titles on the WTA Tour and 26 titles (17 in singles, 9 in doubles) on the ITF Circuit. She also ended runner-up at the Premier-level 2019 St. Petersburg Trophy and at the 2021 Yarra Valley Classic in doubles, along with Anna Kalinskaya. With the Slovakia team, she contributed to achieve for the first time the final for her country at 2024 Billie Jean King Cup, losing only in the final to Italian Lucia Bronzetti.

As a junior, she won the girls' doubles event at the 2015 US Open alongside Aleksandra Pospelova, defeating Kalinskaya and Anastasia Potapova in the final. A year later, she entered final of the 2016 US Open in the girls' singles, where she lost to Kayla Day. She continued her success at majors as a senior, reaching the 2019 US Open semifinal in the women's doubles alongside Aliaksandra Sasnovich, where they lost to Ashleigh Barty and Victoria Azarenka.

== Early life and background ==
Kužmová was born 1998 in Košice to mother Ingrid and father Radovan. Sister Katarína, who is three years younger, followed her into the world of professional tennis, and obtained her WTA first ranking points in 2018. Kužmová was introduced to tennis at age four by her father, who used to run a tennis club.

== Juniors ==
Kužmová reached a career-high ranking of No. 24 as a junior. She began playing on the ITF Junior Circuit in January 2012 at age 13, and in September of the same year won her first singles and doubles titles at the low-level Grade-5 Mostar Open. The following year, she won the Grade-4 Nazmi Bari Cup in the singles event, and a week later she finished as runner-up in the singles and as champion in the doubles at another Grade-4, the Montenegro Open. During her quarterfinal match at the 2013 Losinj Juniors Cup, against another Slovak player, Nikola Dolakova, she was forced to retire in the second set due to injury. She spent rest of the 2013 season out of tennis.

She returned in early 2014, when she reached her first Grade-2 final in the singles event at the Slovak Junior Indoor. A month later, partnering with Kristína Schmiedlová, she won the doubles title at the Grade-1 Mediterranee Avenir in Casablanca, after being awarded a walkover victory due to the withdrawal of Ioana Ducu and Anna Bondár. Later, again with Schmiedlová, she won another doubles title at the Grade-1 Perin Memorial in Umag. Kužmová made her junior major debut in 2014 at the French Open, reaching only the first round in both the singles and the doubles. Then, she went one round further at Wimbledon, reaching the second round in both the singles and the doubles. At the US Open, she lost in the second round in singles but partnered with Schmiedlová to make her first semifinal at a Grand Slam tournament.

In January 2015, in her debut at the Australian Open, she reached her first major third round in singles, while in doubles, she failed in the first round. Despite an early loss at the French Open in both singles and doubles, Kužmová then reached her first singles major semifinal at Wimbledon, but lost to eventual champion Sofya Zhuk. She also made progress in doubles, winning the 2015 US Open alongside Russian player Aleksandra Pospelova. They defeated Potapova and Kalinskaya on their way to the title. Next year, she failed in defending her US Open doubles title but finished runner-up in singles, losing to Kayla Day. During her junior career, she also won two doubles titles with her younger sister Katarina at the Grade-4 Ziliona Junior Open in August 2015 and 2016.

== Career ==
=== 2017–18: WTA Tour & major debut ===
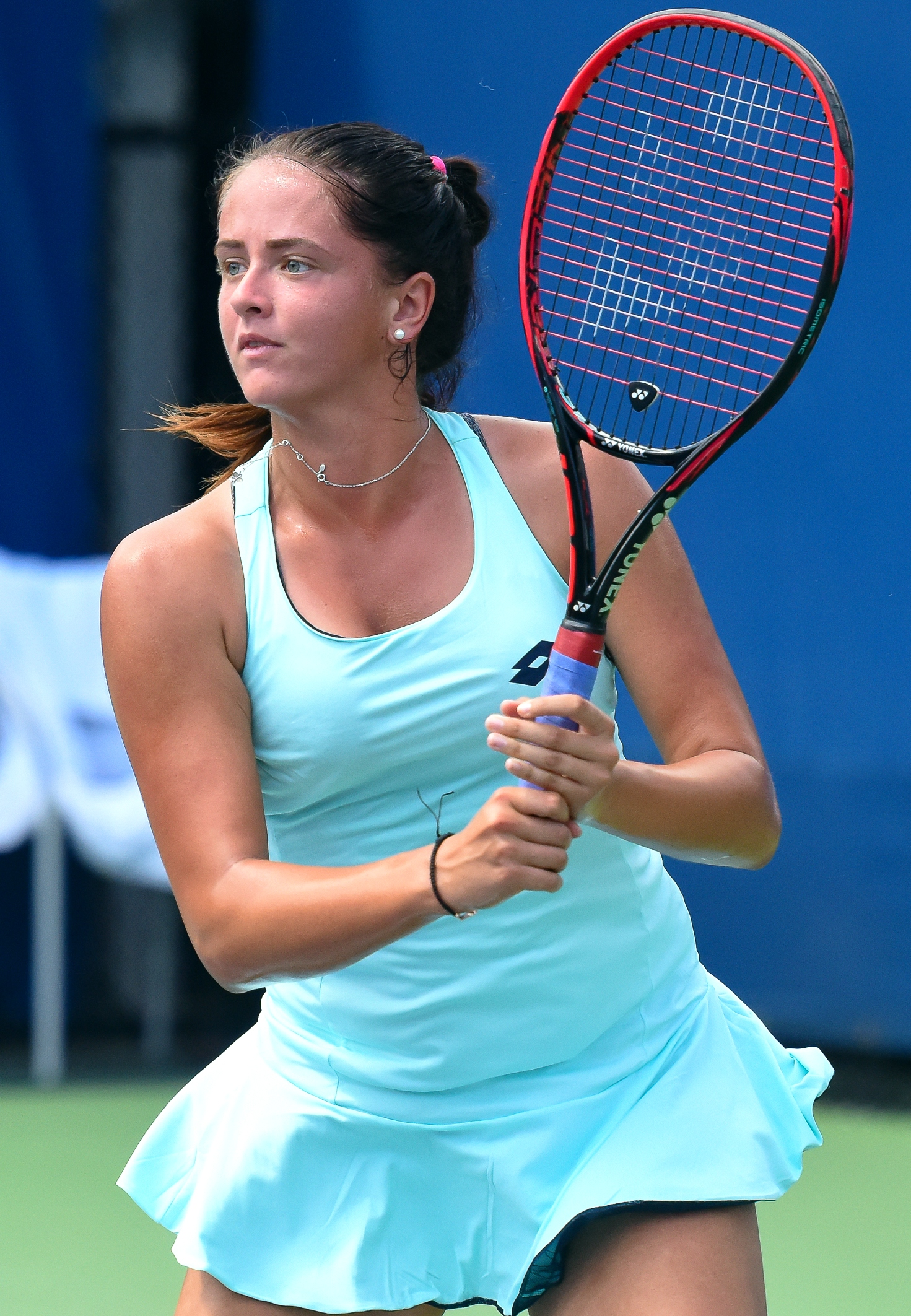
Viktória Kužmová at the 2017 US Open

Kužmová made her major debut at the 2017 US Open. After qualifying, she lost in the first round of the main draw to Venus Williams. She also qualified for the Linz Open and marked her first singles win on WTA Tour, defeating Anna-Lena Friedsam before she lost to another German player, Tatjana Maria. In 2017, Kužmová also appeared at Roland Garros and Wimbledon, but lost at both in qualifying. On 6 March 2017, Kužmová entered the top 200 for the first time, getting to 190th place. On 16 October, she reached No. 130 – her best ranking until 2018. She finished 2017 season at world No. 132.

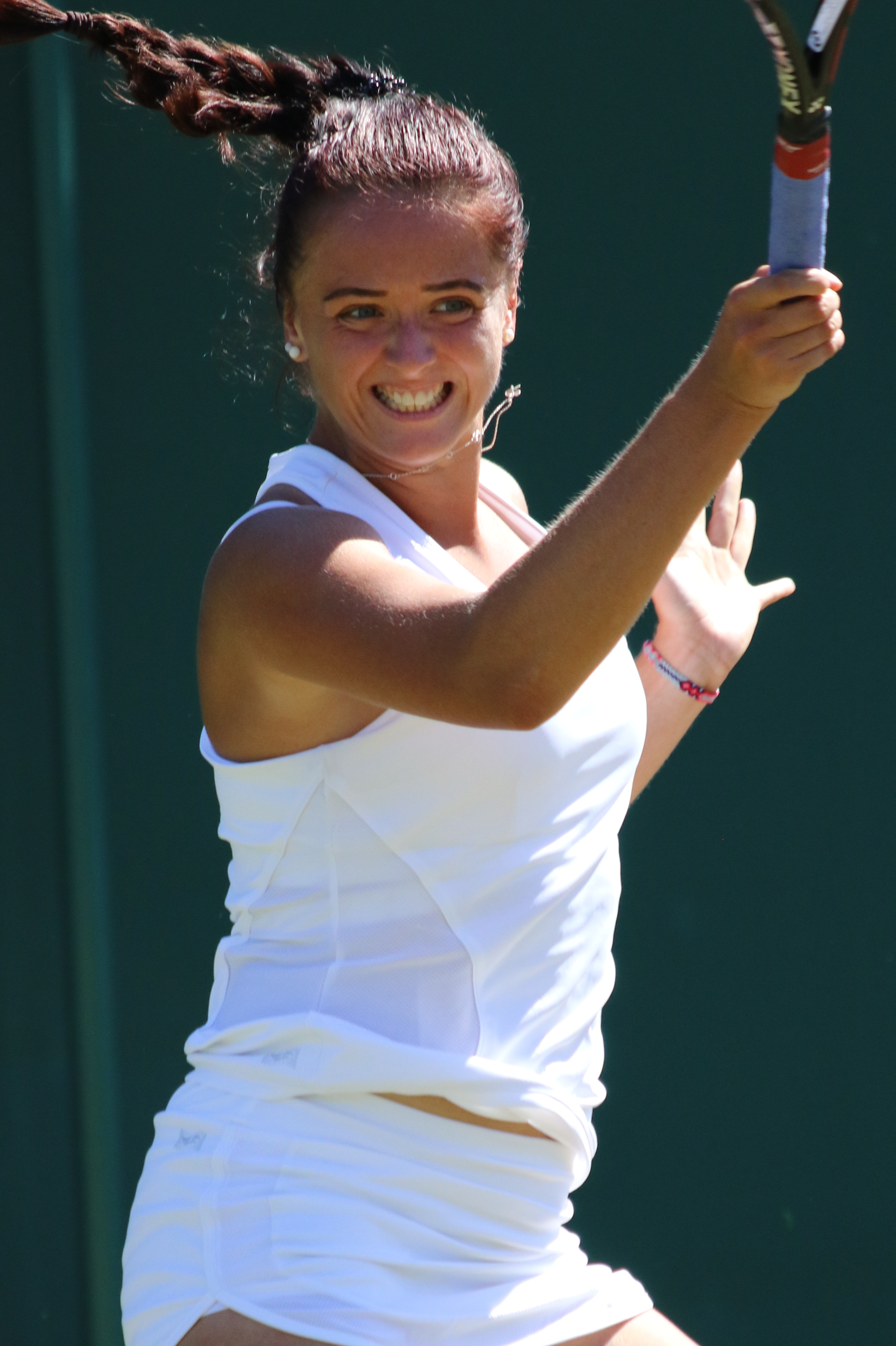
Kužmová at the 2018 Wimbledon Championships

Being outside the top 100, Kužmová was forced to play qualifying at many tournaments. Her first event in 2018 was the Auckland Open, where she reached the main draw and marked her first win in 2018, defeating Jade Lewis but lost to Julia Görges in the second round. At her first Australian Open, she qualified but still was not ready to mark her first major main-draw win, losing to Elise Mertens. At the St. Petersburg Trophy, she passed qualifying but then lost to Daria Kasatkina in the first round of the main draw. At the Hungarian Open, Kužmová made her first WTA Tour semifinal and was then stopped by Alison Van Uytvanck.

In the clay-court season, Kužmová lost in the first round of the Prague Open. A few days after turning 20, she won the 100k Empire Slovak Open, and the following week, on 21 May 2018, she debuted in the top 100, being noted 84th. At her French Open debut, she marked her first major main-draw match win, defeating former French Open champion, Francesca Schiavone. In the second round, she lost to No. 4 seed, Elina Svitolina, in straight sets. She started grass-court season, reaching her second tour singles semifinal at the Rosmalen Championships, where she lost to Kirsten Flipkens. At the Mallorca Open, she had to qualify and succeeded, before she lost to Polona Hercog in the first round. She finished her grass-court season with her main-draw debut at Wimbledon, where she was defeated by Rebecca Peterson – but with that match she completed participation at all four major events in the main draw. After that, she competed on the ITF Circuit. At the Hungarian Ladies Open, she won the title defeating Ekaterina Alexandrova; it was her second 100k singles career title.

Returning to WTA Tour, she played at the Swiss Open in Gstaad and at the Moscow River Cup. In Gstaad, she defeated Martina Trevisan in the first round, and then lost to Veronika Kudermetova. In Moscow, she lost in the first round of the main draw to Görges. She then went to the US Open Series, first at the Cincinnati Open, where she played her first Premier 5 qualifying and beat Caroline Dolehide and Camila Giorgi, securing her place in the main draw. There she marked her first Premier 5 win, defeating another qualifier, Sasnovich, in three sets. In the second round, she lost to Kristina Mladenovic. At the US Open, she lost to Azarenka in the first round of the main draw. In September, Kužmová went to China to play at the Guangzhou Open, where she defeated Ivana Jorović in the first round but lost in the next round to Bernarda Pera. Her next step was the Premier 5 Wuhan Open, where she lost in the first round of qualifying to Wang Xiyu. Back in Europe, she lost in the first rounds of the Linz Open and the Luxembourg Open. On 17 December 2018, after winning the 100k Dubai Tennis Challenge, Kužmová debuted in the top 50. She finished the year as No. 56.

=== 2019: Success in doubles, Dubai quarterfinal & first top-10 win in singles ===
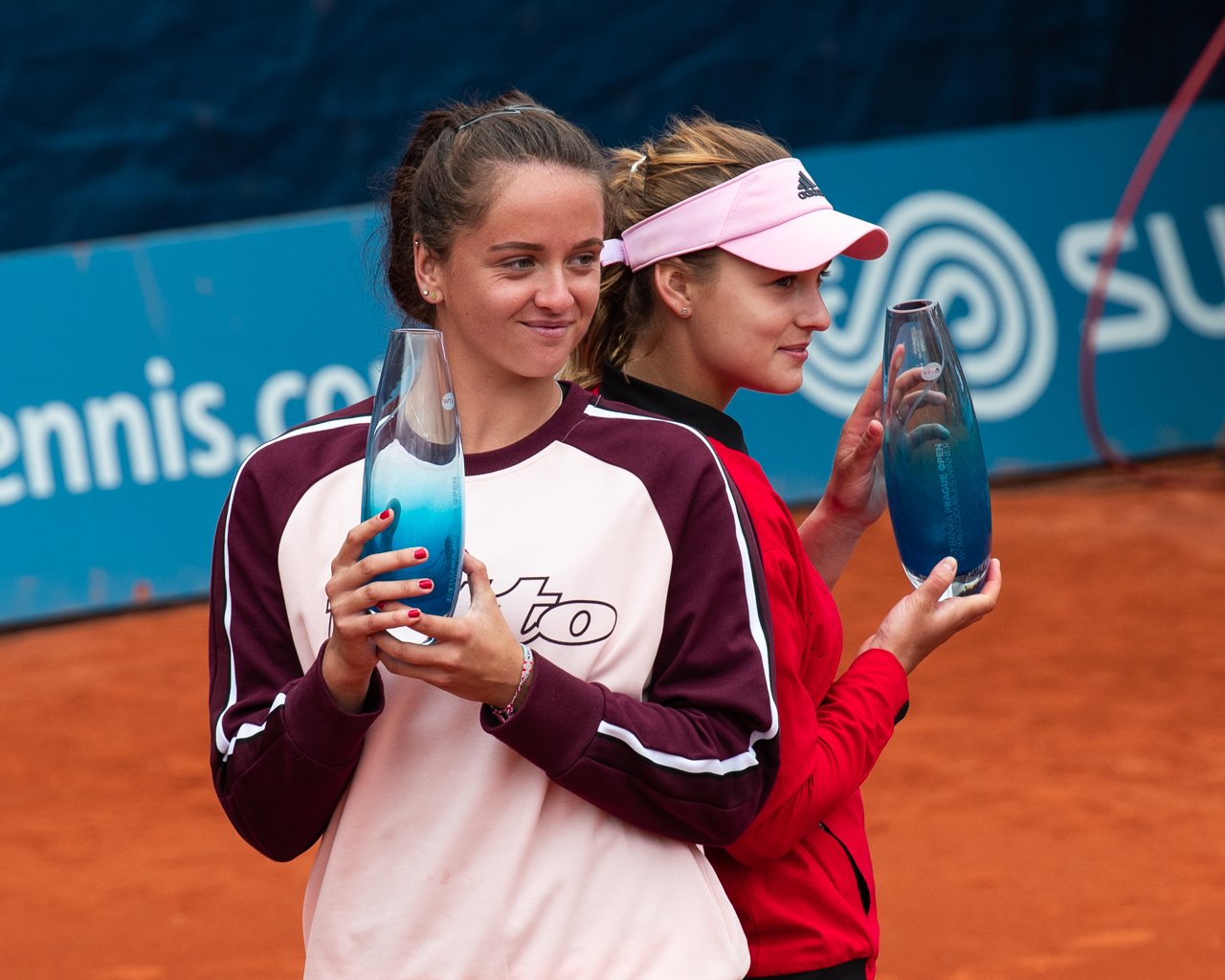
Kužmová (left, along with Anna Kalinskaya) won two doubles titles on the 2019 WTA Tour

==== Singles: Continuing progress ====
Kužmová started the year really well, getting to the semifinal at the Auckland Open, where Julia Görges stopped her achieving her first WTA singles final. Then, at both the Hobart International and Australian Open, she was eliminated in the second round, losing to Flipkens in Hobart, and then to Svitolina in Melbourne (Australian Open). At the Dubai Tennis Championships, she reached her first Premier 5 quarterfinal, winning against Pera, Kiki Bertens and Sofia Kenin, before she lost to Petra Kvitová. The win against Bertens in the second round of the Dubai Championships was her first top-ten win. She then traveled to the United States to play the Premier-Mandatory Indian Wells Open, where she lost in the first round to Zhang Shuai. This was followed up by a third round on her debut of another Premier Mandatory tournament, the Miami Open, where she was eliminated by Bertens.

Her first tournament of the clay-court season was the Ladies Open Lugano, where she went to the second round before losing to Iga Świątek. She then lost in the first round of the Istanbul Cup to Barbora Strýcová, followed by another first-round loss at the Prague Open to Anna Karolína Schmiedlová. At the Premier Mandatory-level Madrid Open, she won against Julia Görges and Carla Suárez Navarro, in the first two rounds, and then failed to reach her first Premier Mandatory quarterfinal, losing to Simona Halep in the third round. The next week, at the Premier 5 Italian Open, she was better than Sara Errani in the first round but then lost to Barty in three sets. She closed out this part of the season with her performance at the French Open. During the first set in the second round, her opponent, seed No. 4 Bertens, was forced to retire due to injury. This provided Kužmová her first appearance in the third round of a Grand Slam tournament. She then lost to Johanna Konta.

After the clay-court season, Kužmová did not do well, losing in the first round at all of the grass tournaments: at the Rosmalen Championships to Margarita Gasparyan, at the Mallorca Open to Maria Sharapova, and at Wimbledon to Polona Hercog. At the clay-played Bucharest Open, she went to the quarterfinal, where eventual champion Elena Rybakina defeated her. At the Palermo Ladies Open, she was eliminated by Arantxa Rus in the second round. On the US hardcourt series, she suffered three first-round losses: at the Cincinnati Open she lost to Zheng Saisai, winning only four games, then at the Bronx Open, she lost to Karolína Muchová, while at the US Open she lost to Van Uytvanck. After that, she made two quarterfinals, at the Tashkent Open, where Kristýna Plíšková eliminated her and at the Linz Open, where Andrea Petkovic sent her out the tournament. The Luxembourg Open was the last WTA tournament for Kužmová in 2019, where she lost in the second round to Laura Siegemund.

==== Doubles: Top 30, US Open semifinals, two titles on WTA Tour ====
2019 was also successful for Kužmová in the doubles. She reached three WTA doubles finals. The most significant one is Premier-level St. Petersburg Trophy, where she partnered with Anna Kalinskaya and lost to Russian combination Gasparyan and Ekaterina Makarova. However, she won another two finals, two International-level ones. First, in May, she won the Prague Open alongside Kalinskaya defeating Nicole Melichar and Květa Peschke. Then, in July, she won the Bucharest Open final, this time with Kristýna Plíšková. They beat Romanian combination Jaqueline Cristian and Elena-Gabriela Ruse. On 4 February 2019, after reaching the final in St. Petersburg, Kužmová debuted in the top 100, at world No. 94. And on 9 September 2019, after reaching semifinals at the US Open, she entered the top 30 for the first time.

=== 2020: Premier 5 semifinal in doubles ===
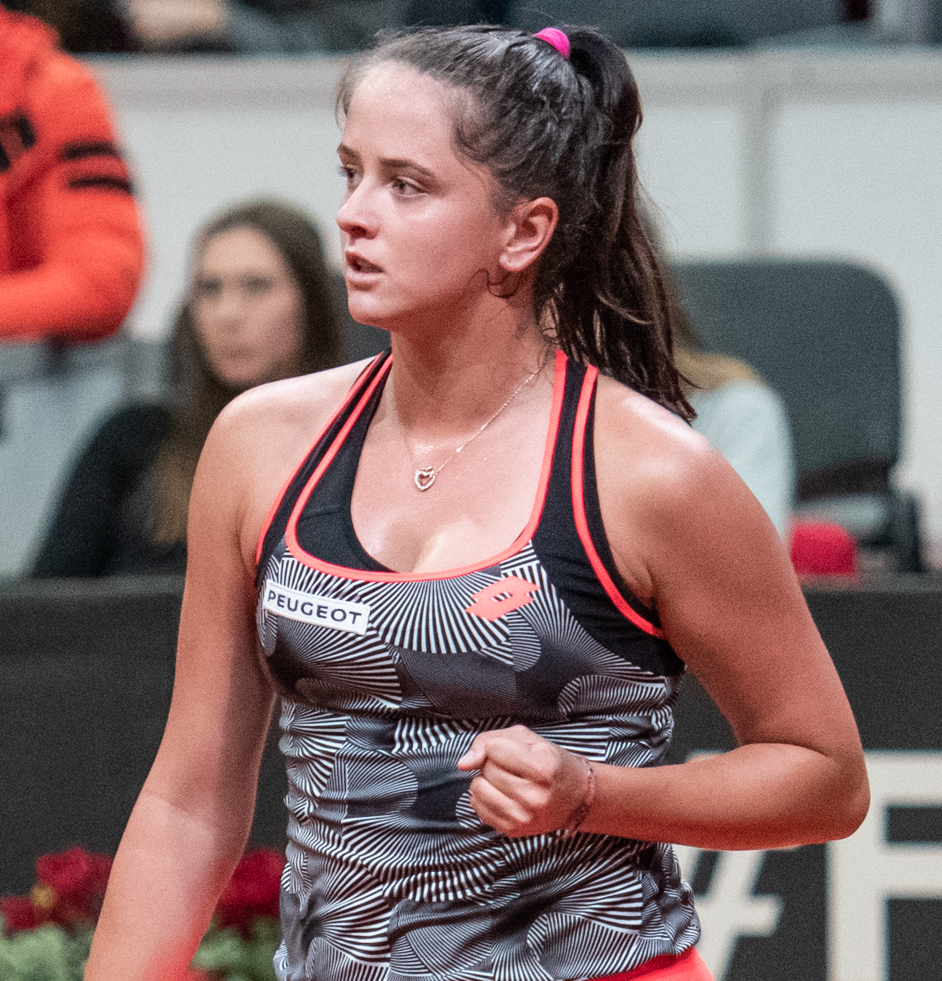
Kužmová in 2020

Kužmová kicked off her 2020 season at the Auckland Open. She lost in the first round to Coco Gauff. The following week at Hobart, she was defeated in the second round by top seed and two-time champion, Elise Mertens. Then, at the Australian Open, Kužmová lost in the first round to Julia Görges. There she also played in the doubles, reaching the third round alongside Sasnovich. She followed up this by her performance at the Premier-level St. Petersburg Trophy, where she lost in the first round to Océane Dodin, winning only four games. At the newly introduced International-level Lyon Open, she got to her first singles quarterfinal in 2020, before losing to Anna-Lena Friedsam and also reaching the semifinal in doubles.

Restarting the tour after the COVID-19 pandemic outbreak, Kužmová lost in the first round of the US Open to Caty McNally, at the Istanbul Cup to Van Uytvanck and at the French Open to Kristýna Plíšková, and failed to qualify at the Cincinnati Open. Despite the loss in singles qualifying at the Cincinnati Open, she got to her first Premier 5/Premier Mandatory semifinal in doubles. She partnered Iga Świątek but they failed to reach the final, losing to Nicole Melichar and Xu Yifan. She finished the 2020 season with another first-round loss at the Linz Open, losing there to Stefanie Vögele.

=== 2023: Guangzhou Open quarterfinal, Linz doubles title ===
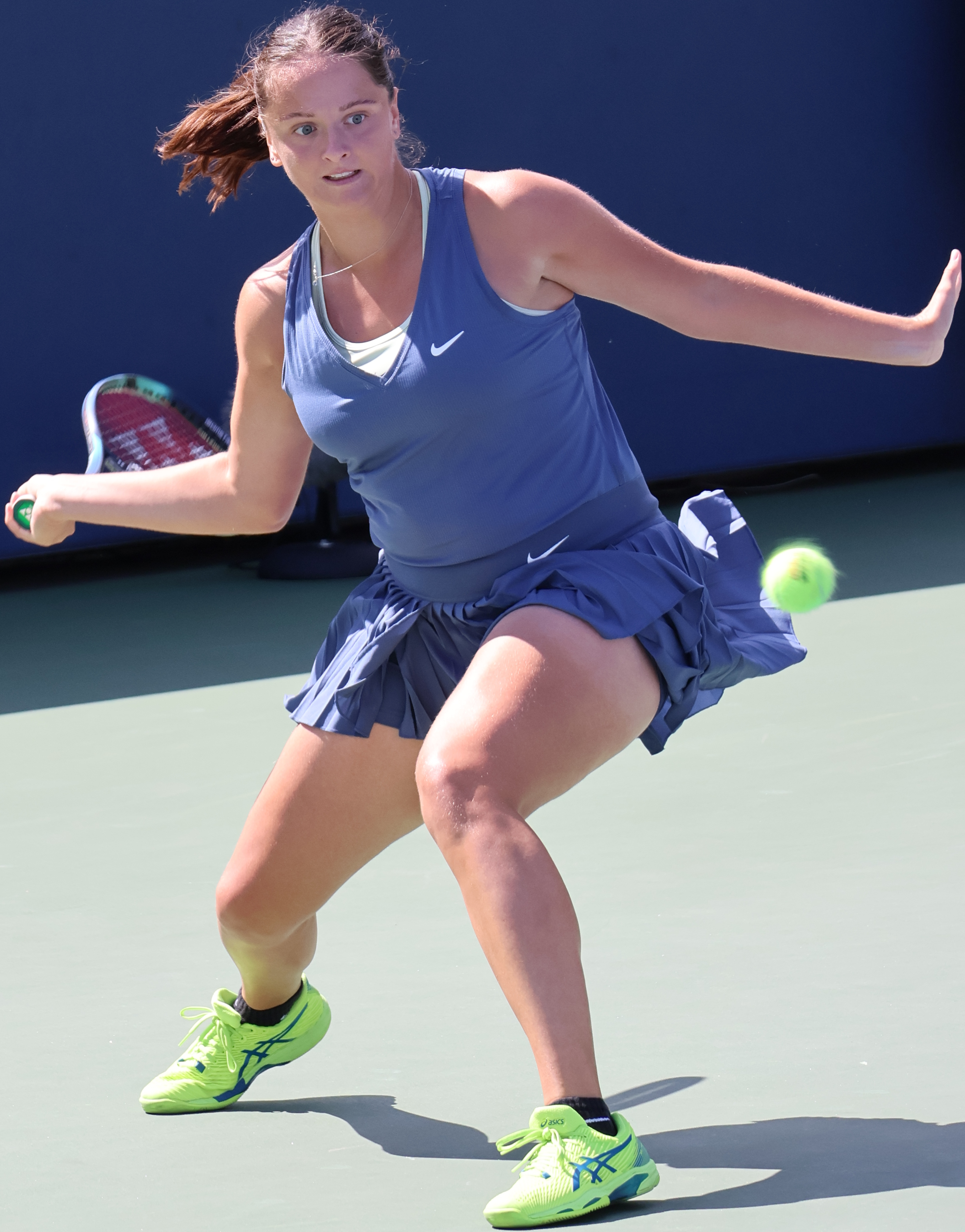
Hrunčáková at the 2023 US Open

Partnering Natela Dzalamidze, Hrunčáková won the doubles title at the Linz Open, defeating Anna-Lena Friedsam and Nadiia Kichenok in the final.

She entered the French Open as a lucky loser after an absence in the main draw at this major since 2020, but lost in the first round to 28th seed Elise Mertens.

At the Rosmalen Open, Hrunčáková reached the semifinal in singles, her first since Auckland 2019, defeating sixth seed Bianca Andreescu and Ashlyn Krueger, before losing to top seed Veronika Kudermetova At the same tournament she also made the doubles final with compatriot Tereza Mihalíková, where they lost to third seeds Shuko Aoyama and Ena Shibahara.

She qualified for Wimbledon, but lost in the first round to Elise Martens for the second Grand Slam tournament in succession.

Hrunčáková also entered the main draw of the US Open as a lucky loser, once again going out in the first round, this time to Wang Xiyu.

Again entering as a lucky loser at the Guangzhou Open, she defeated Anna Kalinskaya and wildcard Yuan Yue to reach the quarterfinals where she lost to Wang Xiyu in three sets.

Hrunčáková qualified for the Ningbo Open but lost to fourth seed Anna Blinkova. At the same tournament in doubles, she reached the semifinals with Arantxa Rus.

=== 2024: Billie Jean King Cup finalist ===
Hrunčáková started the 2024 season by winning the doubles title at the WTA 250 tournament in Auckland. With Anna Danilina, she defeated the top seeds Marie Bouzková and Bethanie Mattek-Sands in the final.

In November at the BJK Cup finals, Hrunčáková paired with Tereza Mihalíková in the doubles to defeat Ashlyn Krueger and Taylor Townsend to secure Slovakia a 2-1 win over the United States in the first round. In the quarterfinals against Australia, she played singles and won her match against Kimberly Birrell, leading to a 2-0 victory. Against Great Britain in the semifinals, Hrunčáková was defeated by Emma Raducanu, but later redeemed herself by winning the deciding doubles match with Mihalíková against Olivia Nicholls and Heather Watson to seal a 2-1 victory in the overall tie. In the final against Italy, she lost to Lucia Bronzetti, and Slovakia were defeated 2-0.

== National representation ==
=== Junior competitions ===
In August 2014, she made her first appearance at the Youth Olympic Games but lost to Jeļena Ostapenko in the first round. In the doubles, she was also eliminated in the first round, partnering with Kristína Schmiedlová, and also played in the mixed doubles alongside Martin Blasko, reaching the second round. A month later, Kužmová represented Slovakia at the Junior Fed Cup in 2014. In the round-robin, Slovakia faced France, Egypt and Japan and defeated all three teams. During the round-robin, Kužmová won all of her three singles matches against Tessah Andrianjafitrimo from France, Habiba Lasheen from Egypt and Chihiro Muramatsu from Japan. In the doubles, she recorded another two wins in the round-robin, partnering with Tereza Mihalíková against Japan and Tamara Kupkova against Egypt. Slovakia then advanced to the semifinal, where they played against Hungary. She defeated Hungarian player Fanny Stollár in three sets. After Slovakia beat Hungary 2–1, they advanced to the final, in order to fight for the trophy against the United States. Slovakia lost all three-matches, including Kužmová's loss against CiCi Bellis.

The following year, she played at the European Summer Cups. In the first round, Slovakia faced Russia. Kužmová lost her match against Anna Kalinskaya, while Tereza Mihalíková defeated Anna Blinkova, leaving some hopes for her team to qualify to the next round. The decisive match belonged to Russia, where Kalinskaya and Aleksandra Pospelova defeated Kužmová and Mihalíková. Slovakia then has to fight for 5th-8th place, and first faced the United Kingdom. Kužmová won her singles match against Maia Lumsden, but lost in the doubles alongside Martina Okalova to Emily Arbuthnott and Ema Lazic. This meant that Slovakia needed to fight for seventh place against the Netherlands. Kužmová only played in the doubles as the decisive match, and won alongside Mihalíková after losing only one game.

=== Fed Cup / Billie Jean King Cup ===
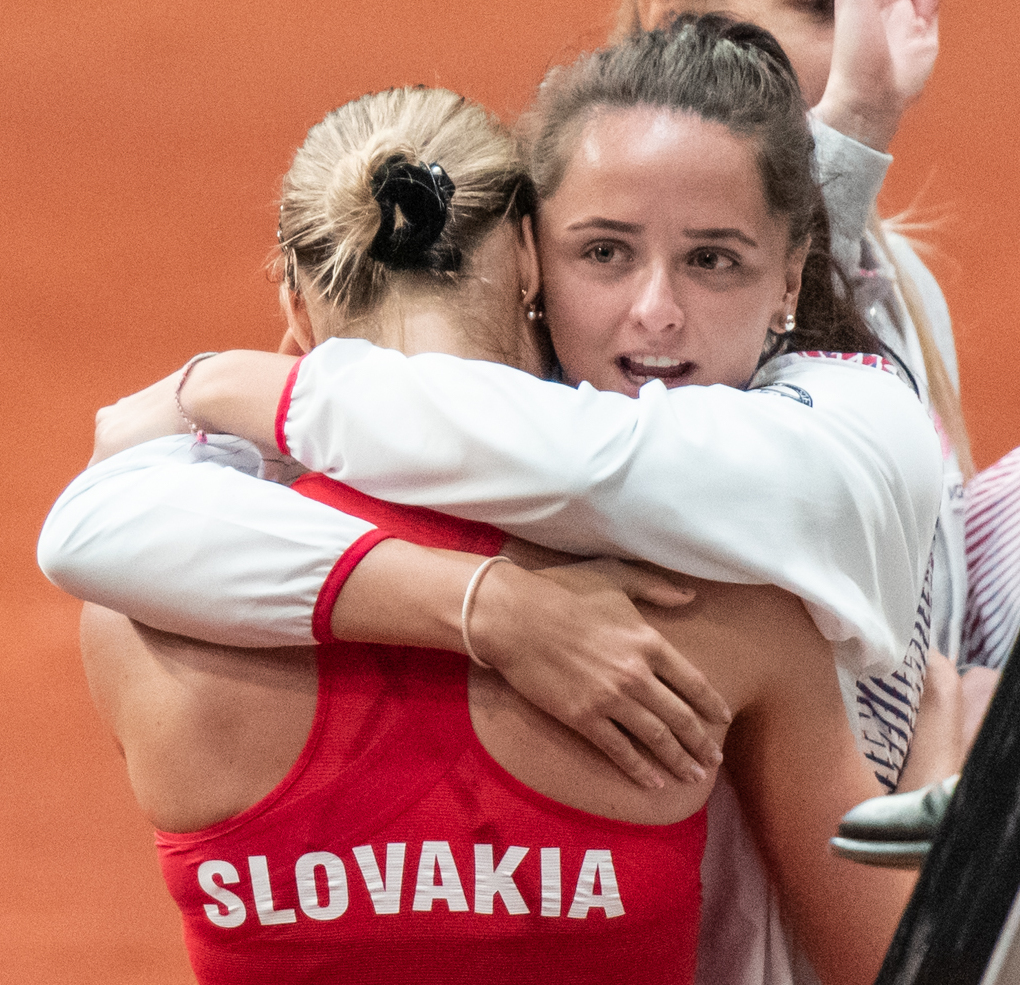
With Schmiedlová at the 2020 Fed Cup

Kužmová made her senior Fed Cup debut for Slovakia in 2018. In 2020, the tournament changed its name to the Billie Jean King Cup. She has played in 18 ties, compiling an overall record of 21–11 split between 15–6 in singles and 6–5 in doubles. When Kužmová debuted for Slovakia, they were in World Group II, playing against Russia. She debuted with a singles loss against Natalia Vikhlyantseva but in the next match, she defeated Anastasia Potapova. Slovakia defeated Russia 4–1, and advanced to the World Group Play–offs, where they played against Belarus for a spot in the World Group following year. Despite the fact that Slovakia lost, Kužmová won both of her singles matches, against Aryna Sabalenka and Sasnovich. In a decisive match against Lidziya Marozava and Vera Lapko, Kužmová and Anna Karolína Schmiedlová failed to send their country in the World Group. The following year, in her first match in the World Group II play-offs against Brazil, she faced Beatriz Haddad Maia and won. Since it was obvious that Slovakia had won, Kužmová's match against Carolina Alves was cancelled but she played doubles alongside Rebecca Šramková and they lost in straight sets. In 2020, for the third year in a row, Kužmová was part of the team. Playing against Great Britain, she defeated Harriet Dart.

In November 2024, Hrunčáková partnered Tereza Mihalíková to win the deciding doubles match against the USA pair of Taylor Townsend and Ashlyn Krueger that saw Slovakia qualify for the 2024 Billie Jean King Cup quarterfinals. She then defeated Kimberly Birrell as Slovakia overcame Australia to reach the semifinals. Hrunčáková lost to Emma Raducanu in the opening singles match of the semi-final against Great Britain, but returned to partner Mihalíková to defeat Olivia Nicholls and Heather Watson in the doubles and earn Slovakia a place in the final for the first time since 2002. Hrunčáková lost the opening singles match of the final to Lucia Bronzetti as Slovakia were defeated by Italy.

== Playing style ==
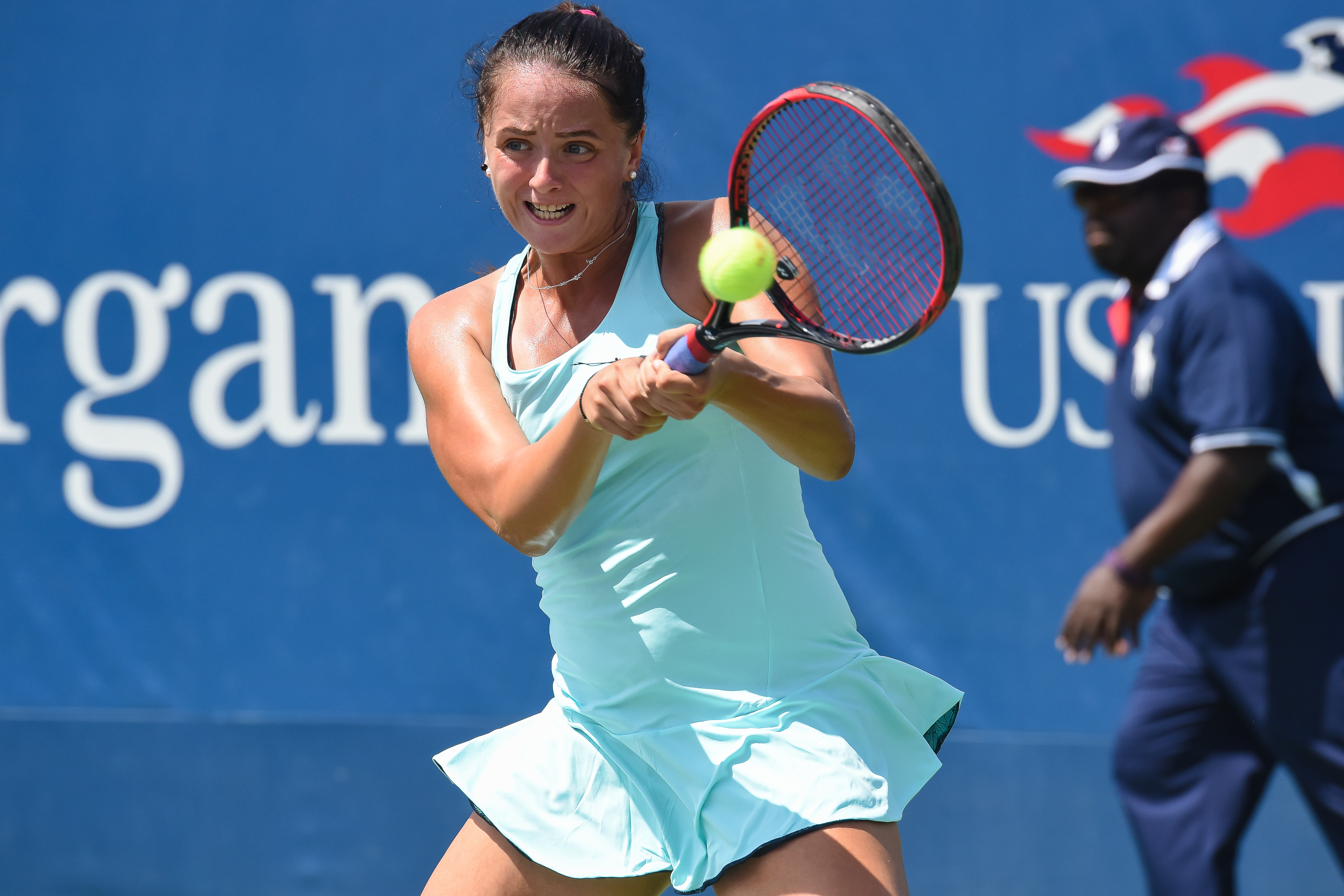
Kužmová's backhand

Kužmová is most known for her fast and aggressive style of play. She is also talented striker of the ball. She has the ability to create easy pace off both wings, which makes her hard to play against as she presents problems from both sides. Despite growing up on clay as only surface available in her hometown Košice, she prefers hardcourt. There, with her strong serve, she is able to win many points but she also enjoys playing on other surfaces, especially grass.

== Apparel and equipment ==
Kužmová is sponsored by Yonex. She uses the VCORE-100 racquet and Tourna grip.

== Coach ==
During her junior ages, she was coached by Ján Sabovčík with whom she triumphed at the 2015 US Open in the doubles event. They split in late 2017. Then in December 2017, she started collaboration with Slovak tennis player Michal Mertiňák. In June 2020, she ended her collaboration with him. She is currently "coached" by her husband, Tomáš Hrunčák.

== Personal life ==
Hrunčáková resides in Košice in Slovakia. In October 2018, she began studying International Relations and Diplomacy at a Czech university with a campus in Bratislava. Along with tennis, she enjoys reading books, and also photography. Her favourite place is Long Island City. Growing up, she enjoyed watching Ana Ivanovic and Rafael Nadal. She plays for VSE TK Akademik Košice tennis club. She is a member of the "STARS for STARS" project.

She won the award for the Slovak Talent of the Year in 2012 and 2014. Kužmová was nominated for the 2018 Fed Cup Heart Award, after making two important wins against Aryna Sabalenka and Aliaksandra Sasnovich, but lost to Eugenie Bouchard.

She married her coach, Tomáš Hrunčák, in September 2022, and changed to competing under her married name, Hrunčáková as of April 2023.

== Performance timelines ==
Key
| W | F | SF | QF | #R | RR | Q# | P# | DNQ | A | Z# | PO | G | S | B | NMS | NTI | P | NH |

(W) winner; (F) finalist; (SF) semifinalist; (QF) quarterfinalist; (#R) rounds 4, 3, 2, 1; (RR) round-robin stage; (Q#) qualification round; (P#) preliminary round; (DNQ) did not qualify; (A) absent; (Z#) Davis/Fed Cup Zonal Group (with number indication) or (PO) play-off; (G) gold, (S) silver or (B) bronze Olympic/Paralympic medal; (NMS) not a Masters tournament; (NTI) not a Tier I tournament; (P) postponed; (NH) not held; (SR) strike rate (events won / competed); (W–L) win–loss record.
To avoid confusion and double counting, these charts are updated at the conclusion of a tournament or when the player's participation has ended.

Only main-draw results in WTA Tour, Grand Slam tournaments, Billie Jean King Cup, United Cup, Hopman Cup and Olympic Games are included in win–loss records.

=== Singles ===
Current through the 2024 Wuhan Open.

| Tournament | 2017 | 2018 | 2019 | 2020 | 2021 | 2022 | 2023 | 2024 | 2025 | SR | W–L | Win % |
|---|---|---|---|---|---|---|---|---|---|---|---|---|
Grand Slam tournaments
| Australian Open | A | 1R | 2R | 1R | 1R | 1R | Q1 | Q1 | Q1 | 0 / 5 | 1–5 | 17% |
| French Open | Q2 | 2R | 3R | 1R | Q2 | Q3 | 1R | Q1 | A | 0 / 4 | 3–4 | 43% |
| Wimbledon | Q3 | 1R | 1R | NH | Q1 | Q2 | 1R | Q1 | A | 0 / 3 | 0–3 | 0% |
| US Open | 1R | 1R | 1R | 1R | Q1 | 2R | 1R | Q1 | Q1 | 0 / 6 | 1–6 | 14% |
| Win–loss | 0–1 | 1–4 | 3–4 | 0–3 | 0–1 | 1–2 | 0–3 | 0–0 | 0–0 | 0 / 18 | 5–18 | 22% |
National representation
| Billie Jean King Cup (Note: Formerly known as Fed Cup until 2020.) | A | PO | WG2 | RR (Note: Edition is split into the two years due to COVID-19.) | | RR | QR | F | QR | 0 / 3 | 12–5 | 71% |
WTA 1000
| Dubai / Qatar Open (Note: The first Premier 5 event of the year has switched back and forth between the Dubai Tennis Championships and the Qatar Ladies Open since 2009. Dubai was classified as a Premier 5 event from 2009 to 2011 before being succeeded by Doha for the 2012–2014 period. In 2015, Dubai regained its Premier 5 status while Doha was demoted to Premier status. The Premier 5 tournaments were reclassified as WTA 1000 tournaments in 2021.) | A | A | QF | A | A | A | A | A | A | 0 / 1 | 3–1 | 75% |
| Indian Wells Open | A | A | 1R | NH | A | A | Q1 | A | A | 0 / 1 | 0–1 | 0% |
| Miami Open | A | A | 3R | NH | Q2 | A | A | A | A | 0 / 1 | 2–1 | 67% |
| Madrid Open | A | A | 3R | NH | A | A | Q1 | A | A | 0 / 1 | 2–1 | 67% |
| Italian Open | A | A | 2R | A | A | A | A | A | A | 0 / 1 | 1–1 | 50% |
| Canadian Open | A | A | A | NH | A | A | A | A | | 0 / 0 | 0–0 | – |
| Cincinnati Open | A | 2R | 1R | Q2 | A | A | A | A | | 0 / 2 | 1–2 | 33% |
| Guadalajara Open | NH | | | | | A | A | A | | 0 / 0 | 0–0 | – |
| China Open | A | A | A | NH | | | A | A | | 0 / 0 | 0–0 | – |
| Wuhan Open | A | Q1 | A | NH | | | | A | | 0 / 0 | 0–0 | – |
| Win–loss | 0–0 | 1–1 | 8–6 | 0–0 | 0–0 | 0–0 | 0–0 | 0–0 | 0-0 | 0 / 7 | 9–7 | 56% |
Career statistics
| | 2017 | 2018 | 2019 | 2020 | 2021 | 2022 | 2023 | 2024 | 2025 | SR | W–L | Win % |
| Tournaments | 2 | 16 | 23 | 9 | 8 | 5 | 11 | | | Career total: 74 | | |
| Titles | 0 | 0 | 0 | 0 | 0 | 0 | 0 | | | Career total: 0 | | |
| Finals | 0 | 0 | 0 | 0 | 0 | 0 | 0 | | | Career total: 0 | | |
| Overall win–loss | 1–2 | 14–17 | 25–23 | 4–9 | 8–8 | 2–6 | 12–12 | | | 0 / 74 | 66–77 | 46% |
| Win (%) | 33% | 45% | 52% | 31% | 50% | 25% | 50% | | | Career total: 46% | | |
| Year-end ranking (Note: 2014: WTA ranking–703, 2014: WTA ranking–440, 2014: WTA ranking–225.) | 132 | 56 | 52 | 96 | 174 | 146 | 117 | 241 | | $2,600,473 | | |

=== Doubles ===
Current through the 2023 Linz Open.

| Tournament | 2016 | 2017 | 2018 | 2019 | 2020 | 2021 | 2022 | 2023 | SR | W–L | Win % |
|---|---|---|---|---|---|---|---|---|---|---|---|
Grand Slam tournaments
| Australian Open | A | A | A | 1R | 3R | 3R | 3R | A | 0 / 4 | 6–4 | 60% |
| French Open | A | A | 2R | 2R | 3R | 1R | 1R | A | 0 / 5 | 4–5 | 44% |
| Wimbledon | A | A | Q2 | 1R | NH | 3R | 2R | 3R | 0 / 4 | 5–4 | 56% |
| US Open | A | A | 2R | SF | 1R | 1R | A | A | 0 / 4 | 5–4 | 56% |
| Win–loss | 0–0 | 0–0 | 2–2 | 5–4 | 4–3 | 4–4 | 3–3 | 2–1 | 0 / 17 | 20–17 | 54% |
WTA 1000
| Dubai / Qatar Open | A | A | A | 2R | A | A | A | | 0 / 1 | 1–1 | 50% |
| Indian Wells Open | A | A | A | A | NH | A | A | | 0 / 0 | 0–0 | – |
| Miami Open | A | A | A | A | NH | A | A | | 0 / 0 | 0–0 | – |
| Madrid Open | A | A | A | A | NH | A | A | | 0 / 0 | 0–0 | – |
| Italian Open | A | A | A | A | A | A | A | | 0 / 0 | 0–0 | – |
| Canadian Open | A | A | A | A | NH | A | A | | 0 / 0 | 0–0 | – |
| Cincinnati Open | A | A | A | A | SF | A | A | | 0 / 1 | 3–1 | 75% |
| Wuhan Open | A | A | A | A | NH | | | | 0 / 0 | 0–0 | – |
| China Open | A | A | A | A | NH | | | | 0 / 0 | 0–0 | – |
| Guadalajara Open | NH | | | | | | A | | 0 / 0 | 0–0 | – |
Career statistics
| Tournaments | 1 | 0 | 5 | 15 | 5 | 11 | 9 | 2 | Career total: 48 | | |
| Titles | 0 | 0 | 0 | 2 | 0 | 1 | 0 | 1 | Career total: 4 | | |
| Finals | 0 | 0 | 0 | 3 | 0 | 3 | 0 | 1 | Career total: 7 | | |
| Overall win–loss | 0–1 | 0–0 | 4–6 | 23–13 | 9–5 | 17–11 | 9–9 | 6–1 | 4 / 48 | 68–46 | 60% |
| Year-end ranking | 441 | 554 | 127 | 29 | 29 | 57 | 89 | 78 | | | |

== WTA Tour finals ==
=== Doubles: 9 (5 titles, 4 runner-ups) ===
| Legend Grand Slam WTA 1000 WTA 500 (0–2) WTA 250 (5–2) | Finals by surface Hard (3–3) Clay (2–0) Grass (0–1) | Finals by setting Outdoor (3–3) Indoor (2–1) |

| Result | W–L | Date | Tournament | Tier | Surface | Partner | Opponents | Score |
|---|---|---|---|---|---|---|---|---|
| Loss | 0–1 | Feb 2019 | St. Petersburg Trophy, Russia | Premier (Note: The WTA Tier II tournaments were reclassified as WTA Premier tournaments in 2009 and later as WTA 500 tournaments in 2021.) | Hard (i) | (Russia) Anna Kalinskaya | (Russia) Ekaterina Makarova (Russia) Margarita Gasparyan | 5–7, 5–7 |
| Win | 1–1 | May 2019 | Prague Open, Czech Republic | International (Note: The WTA International tournaments were reclassified as WTA 250 tournaments in 2021.) | Clay | (Russia) Anna Kalinskaya | (United States) Nicole Melichar (Czech Republic) Květa Peschke | 4–6, 7–5, [10–7] |
| Win | 2–1 | Jul 2019 | Bucharest Open, Romania | International | Clay | (Czech Republic) Kristýna Plíšková | (Romania) Jaqueline Cristian (Romania) Elena-Gabriela Ruse | 6–4, 7–6^{(3)} |
| Loss | 2–2 | Feb 2021 | Yarra Valley Classic, Australia | WTA 500 | Hard | (Russia) Anna Kalinskaya | (Japan) Shuko Aoyama (Japan) Ena Shibahara | 3–6, 4–6 |
| Win | 3–2 | Mar 2021 | Lyon Open, France | WTA 250 | Hard (i) | (Netherlands) Arantxa Rus | (Canada) Eugenie Bouchard (Serbia) Olga Danilović | 3–6, 7–5, [10–7] |
| Loss | 3–3 | Jul 2021 | Prague Open, Czech Republic | WTA 250 | Hard | (Serbia) Nina Stojanović | (Czech Republic) Marie Bouzková (Czech Republic) Lucie Hradecká | 6–7^{(4)}, 4–6 |
| Win | 4–3 | Feb 2023 | Ladies Linz, Austria | WTA 250 | Hard (i) | (Georgia (country)) Natela Dzalamidze | (Germany) Anna-Lena Friedsam (Ukraine) Nadiia Kichenok | 4–6, 7–5, [12–10] |
| Loss | 4–4 | Jun 2023 | Rosmalen Open, Netherlands | WTA 250 | Grass | (Slovakia) Tereza Mihalíková | (Japan) Shuko Aoyama (Japan) Ena Shibahara | 3–6, 3–6 |
| Win | 5–4 | Jan 2024 | Auckland Open, New Zealand | WTA 250 | Hard | (Kazakhstan) Anna Danilina | (Czech Republic) Marie Bouzková (United States) Bethanie Mattek-Sands | 6–3, 6–7^{(5–7)}, [10–8] |

== WTA Challenger finals ==
=== Doubles: 2 (titles) ===
| Result | W–L | Date | Tournament | Surface | Partner | Opponents | Score |
|---|---|---|---|---|---|---|---|
| Win | 1–0 | Feb 2026 | Oeiras Indoors, Portugal | Hard (i) | (Czech Republic) Gabriela Knutson | (United States) Carmen Corley (United States) Ivana Corley | 7–6^{(9–7)}, 6–3 |
| Win | 2–0 | Jun 2026 | Figueira da Foz Open, Portugal | Hard | (Slovakia) Katarína Kužmová | (Australia) Elena Micic (France) Kristina Mladenovic | 6–4, 6–4 |

== ITF Circuit finals ==
=== Singles: 36 (17 titles, 19 runner-ups) ===
| Legend W100 tournaments (2–1) W60/75 tournaments (1–2) W40/50 tournaments (1–3) W25/35 tournaments (5–11) W10 tournaments (8–2) | Finals by surface Hard (9–13) Clay (4–3) Grass (1–0) Carpet (3–3) |

| Result | W–L | Date | Tournament | Tier | Surface | Opponent | Score |
|---|---|---|---|---|---|---|---|
| Win | 1–0 | Oct 2014 | ITF Heraklion, Greece | W10 | Hard | (Austria) Barbara Haas | 6–4, 6–3 |
| Win | 2–0 | Apr 2015 | ITF Heraklion, Greece | W10 | Hard | (Greece) Valentini Grammatikopoulou | 6–3, 6–4 |
| Win | 3–0 | May 2015 | ITF Antalya, Turkey | W10 | Hard | (Ukraine) Alyona Sotnikova | 6–3, 7–6^{(5)} |
| Win | 4–0 | Sep 2015 | ITF Sharm El Sheikh, Egypt | W10 | Hard | (United Kingdom) Freya Christie | 7–6^{(4)}, 7–5 |
| Win | 5–0 | Oct 2015 | ITF Sharm El Sheikh, Egypt | W10 | Hard | (China) Lu Jiaxi | 6–2, 6–1 |
| Loss | 5–1 | Feb 2016 | ITF Antalya, Turkey | W10 | Clay | (Germany) Anne Schäfer | 6–2, 2–6, 0–6 |
| Win | 6–1 | Mar 2016 | ITF Sharm El Sheikh, Egypt | W10 | Hard | (Russia) Varvara Flink | 4–6, 6–2, 6–1 |
| Loss | 6–2 | Apr 2016 | ITF Antalya, Turkey | W10 | Hard | (Bulgaria) Viktoriya Tomova | 6–7^{(5)}, 2–6 |
| Win | 7–2 | Jul 2016 | ITF Banja Luka, Bosnia & Herzegovina | W10 | Clay | (Slovenia) Manca Pislak | 6–0, 6–1 |
| Win | 8–2 | Jul 2016 | ITF Niš, Serbia | W10 | Clay | (Austria) Mira Antonitsch | 6–1, 6–2 |
| Win | 9–2 | Sep 2016 | ITF Lubbock, United States | W25 | Hard | (United Kingdom) Freya Christie | 6–0, 7–5 |
| Loss | 9–3 | Oct 2016 | Brisbane QTC International, Australia | W25 | Hard | (Australia) Lizette Cabrera | 2–6, 4–6 |
| Loss | 9–4 | Oct 2016 | ITF Cairns, Australia | W25 | Hard | (Australia) Olivia Rogowska | 1–6, 5–7 |
| Loss | 9–5 | Feb 2017 | ITF Perth, Australia | W25 | Hard | (Australia) Destanee Aiava | 1–6, 1–6 |
| Win | 10–5 | Mar 2017 | ITF Mildura, Australia | W25 | Grass | (United Kingdom) Katie Boulter | 6–2, 6–4 |
| Loss | 10–6 | Apr 2017 | ITF Istanbul, Turkey | W25 | Hard | (Bulgaria) Viktoriya Tomova | 4–6, 6–4, 2–6 |
| Win | 11–6 | Jul 2017 | ITF Imola, Italy | W25 | Carpet | (Italy) Stefania Rubini | 6–3, 6–3 |
| Loss | 11–7 | Aug 2017 | ITF Chiswick, United Kingdom | W25 | Hard | (Russia) Vitalia Diatchenko | 3–6, 4–6 |
| Win | 12–7 | Mar 2018 | Pingshan Open, China | W60 | Hard | (Russia) Anna Kalinskaya | 7–5, 6–3 |
| Win | 13–7 | May 2018 | Empire Slovak Open, Slovakia | W100 | Clay | (Paraguay) Verónica Cepede Royg | 6–4, 1–6, 6–1 |
| Win | 14–7 | Jul 2018 | Budapest Pro Ladies Open, Hungary | W100 | Clay | (Russia) Ekaterina Alexandrova | 6–3, 4–6, 6–1 |
| Loss | 14–8 | Dec 2018 | Dubai Tennis Challenge, UAE | W100 | Hard | (China) Peng Shuai | 3–6, 0–6 |
| Loss | 14–9 | Jun 2022 | Pörtschach Trophy, Austria | W60 | Clay | (Germany) Laura Siegemund | 2–6, 2–6 |
| Loss | 14–10 | Nov 2022 | Internazionali di Ortisei, Italy | W25 | Hard (i) | (Croatia) Ana Konjuh | 6–3, 5–7, 6–7^{(2)} |
| Loss | 14–11 | Jan 2023 | ITF Tallinn, Estonia | W40 | Hard (i) | (Turkey) Zeynep Sönmez | 6–7^{(5)}, 6–3, 3–6 |
| Win | 15–11 | Mar 2024 | ITF Solarino, Italy | W35 | Carpet | (United States) Robin Anderson | 6–2, 6–3 |
| Win | 16–11 | Mar 2024 | ITF Murska Sobota, Slovenia | W50 | Hard | (Russia) Valeria Savinykh | 6–0, 6–3 |
| Win | 17–11 | Jul 2024 | ITF Don Benito, Spain | W35 | Carpet | (Serbia) Natalija Stevanović | 6–2, 3–6, 6–4 |
| Loss | 17–12 | Feb 2025 | ITF Birmingham, United Kingdom | W50 | Hard (i) | (United States) Clervie Ngounoue | 6–4, 2–6, 3–6 |
| Loss | 17–13 | Mar 2025 | ITF Solarino, Italy | W35 | Carpet | (Chinese Taipei) Joanna Garland | 6–7^{(4)}, 2–6 |
| Loss | 17–14 | Apr 2025 | ITF Sharm El Sheikh, Egypt | W35 | Hard | (Russia) Polina Iatcenko | 2–6, 2–6 |
| Loss | 17–15 | Jul 2025 | ITF Don Benito, Spain | W35 | Carpet | (United Kingdom) Katie Swan | 6–7^{(5)}, 1–6 |
| Loss | 17–16 | Oct 2025 | Challenger de Saguenay, Canada | W75 | Hard (i) | (Russia) Anastasia Tikhonova | 3–6, 2–6 |
| Loss | 17–17 | Nov 2025 | ITF Orlando, United States | W35 | Clay | (Netherlands) Eva Vedder | 3–6, 6–7^{(6)} |
| Loss | 17–18 | Apr 2026 | ITF Roehampton, United Kingdom | W50 | Hard | (Czech Republic) Vendula Valdmannová | 2–3 ret. |
| Loss | 17–19 | Jul 2026 | ITF Don Benito, Spain | W35 | Carpet | (Switzerland) Valentina Ryser | 4–6, 4–6 |

=== Doubles: 22 (13 titles, 9 runner-ups) ===
| Legend $100,000 tournaments (1–0) $60/75,000 tournaments (6–2) $40/50,000 tournaments (1–4) $25/35,000 tournaments (3–0) $10,000 tournaments (2–3) | Finals by surface Hard (11–7) Clay (1–2) Carpet (1–0) |

| Result | W–L | Date | Tournament | Tier | Surface | Partner | Opponents | Score |
|---|---|---|---|---|---|---|---|---|
| Loss | 0–1 | Mar 2015 | ITF Heraklion, Greece | W10 | Hard | (Czech Republic) Petra Rohanová | (Greece) Valentini Grammatikopoulou (Russia) Anastasiya Komardina | 5–7, 2–6 |
| Win | 1–1 | Oct 2015 | ITF Heraklion, Greece | W10 | Hard | (Romania) Raluca Șerban | (Belgium) Steffi Distelmans (Netherlands) Kelly Versteeg | 6–2, 6–0 |
| Win | 2–1 | Jan 2016 | ITF Antalya, Turkey | W10 | Hard | (Slovakia) Petra Uberalová | (North Macedonia) Lina Gjorcheska (Romania) Ioana Loredana Roșca | 7–6^{(3)}, 6–7^{(6)}, [10–5] |
| Loss | 2–2 | Jul 2016 | ITF Banja Luka, Bosnia & Herzegovina | W10 | Clay | (Bulgaria) Julia Stamatova | (Slovakia) Barbara Kötelesová (Slovenia) Manca Pislak | 7–6^{(5)}, 4–6, [5–10] |
| Loss | 2–3 | Aug 2016 | ITF Slovenská Ľupča, Slovakia | W10 | Clay | (Slovakia) Barbara Kötelesová | (Czech Republic) Petra Krejsová (Slovakia) Chantal Škamlová | 2–6, 1–6 |
| Win | 3–3 | Oct 2016 | ITF Toowoomba, Australia | W25 | Hard | (Hungary) Dalma Gálfi | (Brazil) Gabriela Cé (Slovakia) Tereza Mihalíková | 6–4, 7–6^{(4)} |
| Win | 4–3 | Sep 2017 | Batumi Ladies Open, Georgia | W25 | Hard | (Belgium) Ysaline Bonaventure | (Georgia (country)) Tatia Mikadze (Georgia (country)) Sofia Shapatava | 6–1, 6–3 |
| Win | 5–3 | Mar 2018 | Pingshan Open, China | W60 | Hard | (Russia) Anna Kalinskaya | (Montenegro) Danka Kovinić (China) Wang Xinyu | 6–4, 1–6, [10–7] |
| Win | 6–3 | Mar 2018 | Open de Seine-et-Marne, France | W60 | Hard (i) | (Russia) Anna Kalinskaya | (Czech Republic) Petra Krejsová (Czech Republic) Jesika Malečková | 7–6^{(7)}, 6–1 |
| Win | 7–3 | Nov 2021 | Dubai Tennis Challenge, UAE | W100 | Hard | (Kazakhstan) Anna Danilina | (Russia) Angelina Gabueva (Russia) Anastasia Zakharova | 4–6, 6–3, [10–2] |
| Loss | 7–4 | Nov 2022 | Bratislava Open, Slovakia | W60 | Hard (i) | (Slovakia) Katarína Kužmová | (Czech Republic) Jesika Malečková (Czech Republic) Renata Voráčová | 6–2, 5–7, [11–13] |
| Win | 8–4 | Apr 2024 | ITF Lopota, Georgia | W50 | Hard | (Czech Republic) Tereza Valentová | (Japan) Nagi Hanatani (Poland) Urszula Radwańska | 6–2, 6–1 |
| Loss | 8–5 | Feb 2025 | ITF Birmingham, UK | W50 | Hard (i) | (Poland) Alicja Rosolska | (Portugal) Francisca Jorge (Portugal) Matilde Jorge | 2–6, 6–4, [5–10] |
| Win | 9–5 | Mar 2025 | ITF Solarino, Italy | W35 | Carpet | (Slovakia) Katarína Kužmová | (Belgium) Sofia Costoulas (Germany) Katharina Hobgarski | 6–7^{(4)}, 6–4, [10–5] |
| Loss | 9–6 | Sep 2025 | Templeton Open, US | W75 | Hard | (United States) Usue Maitane Arconada | (Russia) Maria Kozyreva (Slovakia) Martina Okáľová | 2–6, 5–7 |
| Win | 10–6 | Oct 2025 | ITF Toronto, Canada | W75 | Hard (i) | Anastasia Tikhonova | (United States) Fiona Crawley (United States) Jaeda Daniel | 6–4, 6–2 |
| Win | 11–6 | Nov 2025 | ITF Fujairah, UAE | W75 | Hard | (Czech Republic) Vendula Valdmannová | (Australia) Olivia Gadecki (United Kingdom) Mika Stojsavljevic | 6–4, 6–3 |
| Win | 12–6 | Jan 2026 | ITF Manama, Bahrain | W75 | Hard | Anastasia Tikhonova | (Belgium) Polina Bakhmutkina (Germany) Mina Hodzic | 6–4, 6–3 |
| Loss | 12–7 | Mar 2026 | ITF Helsinki, Finland | W50 | Hard (i) | (United Kingdom) Emily Appleton | (Sweden) Caijsa Hennemann (Sweden) Lisa Zaar | 6–2, 3–6, [8–10] |
| Win | 13–7 | Apr 2026 | ITF Portorož, Slovenia | W75 | Clay | (Czech Republic) Anna Sisková | (United States) Rasheeda McAdoo (Sweden) Lisa Zaar | 6–2, 6–4 |
| Loss | 13–8 | Apr 2026 | ITF Roehampton, United Kingdom | W50 | Hard | (United Kingdom) Emily Appleton | (United Kingdom) Freya Christie (United Kingdom) Eden Silva | 6–7^{(7)}, 6–3, [6–10] |
| Loss | 13–9 | Jun 2026 | Guimarães Ladies Open, Portugal | W50 | Hard | (Slovakia) Katarína Kužmová | (United States) Savannah Broadus (United States) Abigail Rencheli | 3–6, 4–6 |

== Junior Grand Slam finals ==
=== Singles: 1 (runner–up) ===
| Result | Year | Tournament | Surface | Opponent | Score |
|---|---|---|---|---|---|
| Loss | 2016 | US Open | Hard | (United States) Kayla Day | 3–6, 2–6 |

=== Doubles: 1 (title) ===
| Result | Year | Tournament | Surface | Partner | Opponents | Score |
|---|---|---|---|---|---|---|
| Win | 2015 | US Open | Hard | (Russia) Aleksandra Pospelova | (Russia) Anna Kalinskaya (Russia) Anastasia Potapova | 7–5, 6–2 |

== Wins over top 10 players ==
- Hrunčáková's match record against players who were, at the time the match was played, ranked in the top 10.

| No. | Player | Rank | Event | Surface | Rd | Score | VKR |
|---|---|---|---|---|---|---|---|
2019
| 1. | (Netherlands) Kiki Bertens | 8 | Dubai Championships, UAE | Hard | 2R | 6–2, 4–6, 7–6^{(6)} | 46 |
| 2. | (Netherlands) Kiki Bertens | 4 | French Open, France | Clay | 2R | 3–1 ret. | 46 |
