= Elena-Gabriela Ruse =

Romanian tennis player (born 1997)

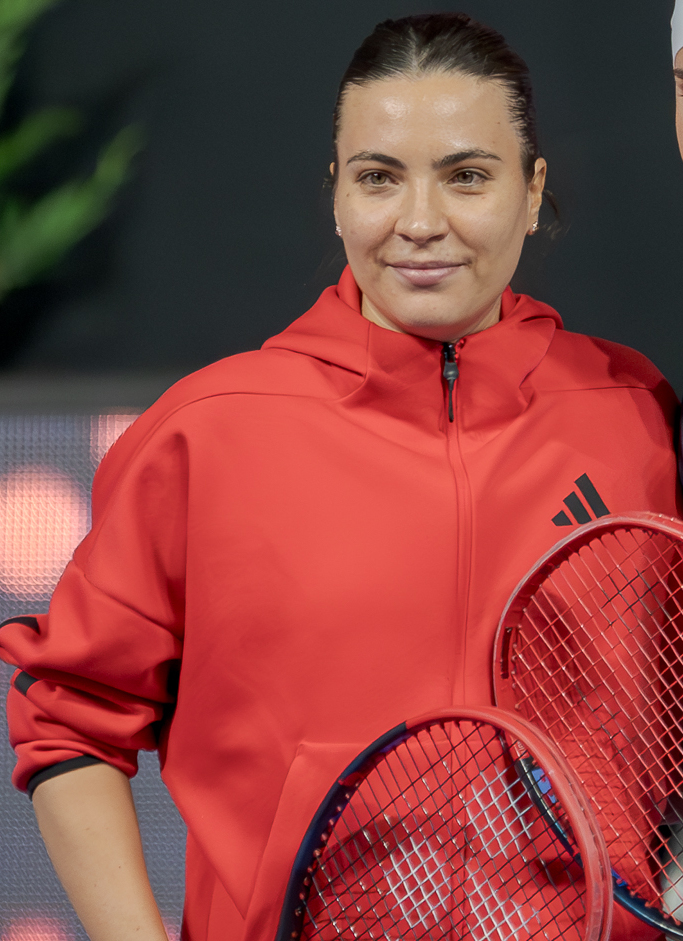
- Ruse at the 2025 Transylvania Open
- Country (sports): Romania
- Residence: Bucharest, Romania
- Born: 6 November 1997 (age 28) Bucharest
- Height: 1.73 m (5 ft 8 in)
- Plays: Right (two-handed backhand)
- Prize money: $4,051,650

Singles
- Career record: 358–228
- Career titles: 1
- Highest ranking: No. 51 (23 May 2022)
- Current ranking: No. 60 (19 October 2026)

Grand Slam singles results
- Australian Open: 3R (2026)
- French Open: 2R (2025)
- Wimbledon: 1R (2018, 2019, 2022, 2024, 2025, 2026)
- US Open: 3R (2024)

Doubles
- Career record: 178–104
- Career titles: 0 WTA, 11 ITF
- Highest ranking: No. 32 (8 May 2023)
- Current ranking: No. 94 (19 October 2026)

Grand Slam doubles results
- Australian Open: SF (2023)
- French Open: SF (2024)
- Wimbledon: 3R (2024, 2026)
- US Open: QF (2021)

Team competitions
- Fed Cup: 2–3
- Last updated on: 19 October 2026.

Elena-Gabriela Ruse (born 6 November 1997) is a Romanian professional tennis player. She has a career-high WTA singles ranking of No. 51 and a best doubles ranking of world No. 32, achieved in May 2022 and 2023, respectively.

Ruse won her maiden WTA Tour singles title at the 2021 Hamburg European Open. She has also won seven singles and eleven doubles titles on the ITF Circuit.

== Career ==
=== 2012–2016: Juniors, WTA Tour debut ===
Ruse won two junior singles titles and eight junior doubles titles. The biggest title of her junior career was the Grade-1 Canadian Open Junior Championships, where she beat Katie Swan in the final. Ruse also reached the semifinals of the 2014 Wimbledon girls' singles event in 2014 and the final of Eddie Herr. On the ITF Junior Circuit, she had a career-high combined ranking of No. 7, achieved on 18 May 2015.

In July 2015, she made her WTA Tour main-draw debut as a wildcard player at the Bucharest Open in the doubles event, partnering Jaqueline Cristian. She also received a wildcard into the qualifying draw in singles at the same tournament and beat Alexandra Cadanțu, before losing her next match to Maria Sakkari. She reached semifinals at $10k events in Bucharest and Antalya.

In December 2015, Ruse won her first professional singles title at Antalya, beating Ekaterine Gorgodze in the final. She finished 2015 with a year-end ranking of No. 642 in singles and No. 575 in doubles.

In January 2016, she qualified for the $25k event in Sunrise, beating former top-30 player Laura Robson along the way, and reached the quarterfinals. After that event, she won ten singles matches and eight doubles matches in a row and won two singles and two doubles titles at $10k events in Antalya. In March, Ruse reached two straight finals at $10k events in Hammamet, Tunisia. She lost the first one to Claudia Giovine in straight sets, snapping her 14-match winning streak in singles, and in the second one she beat Julia Grabher. At the end of April, Ruse qualified for a $25k event in Chiasso, Switzerland and reached the semifinals, where she lost to fellow qualifier Amanda Carreras.

After taking time off for her high school graduation, Ruse returned to competition in June at the $50k event in Essen, Germany. As the last direct acceptance, Ruse shocked top seed Aliaksandra Sasnovich in three sets for her first win over a top-100 player. Due to rain delays in Essen, she had to play her second-round match the same day and lost in straight sets to qualifier Olga Sáez Larra.

=== 2018–2019: Major debut, WTA Tour doubles final ===
Ruse qualified for her major main-draw debut at the 2018 Wimbledon Championships.

She reached her first WTA Tour tournament final at the 2019 Bucharest Open, partnering again with Jaqueline Cristian; they were defeated by Viktória Kužmová and Kristýna Plíšková in the championship match.

=== 2021: Major doubles quarterfinal, WTA Tour singles title ===
She made her WTA 1000 debut at the Indian Wells Open as a qualifier.

Ruse won her maiden WTA Tour singles title at the Hamburg European Open, defeating Andrea Petkovic in the final. As a result of this run, she climbed 65 positions and entered the top 150 in singles at a new career-high of world No. 133. Following her run in Hamburg, Ruse reached a second consecutive final later that month, at the Palermo Ladies Open; however, she lost it in straight sets to Danielle Collins.

She made her US Open debut as a qualifier, but lost in the first round to Markéta Vondroušová. At the same tournament she reached her first Grand Slam doubles quarterfinal partnering Monica Niculescu.

She reached another new career-high of No. 83, on 18 October 2021, and finished the year ranked world No. 85.

=== 2022: Top-10 win & new career-high ranking ===
In Dubai, she qualified into the main draw and defeated world No. 5 and third seed, Paula Badosa, for her first top-10 win.

She reached a new career-high ranking of No. 51, on 23 May 2022.

=== 2023: First singles final since 2021 ===
In doubles at the Australian Open, she reached the semifinals, partnering Marta Kostyuk. She reached the second round at the Monterrey Open as a qualifier, defeating Mérida Open champion, Camila Giorgi.

She qualified for her only major of the season in singles at the US Open. At the same tournament in doubles, she reached the third round with Kostyuk. Ranked No. 188, she reached her first final in more than two years and for the season as a wildcard at the Transylvania Open.

=== 2024: US Open third round, second top 10 win, back to top 100 ===
At the 2024 French Open, she reached the doubles semifinals for the first time at this major, partnering again Marta Kostyuk, with wins over ninth seeds Leylah Fernandez and Erin Routliffe, and then Mirra Andreeva and Vera Zvonareva by walkover.

She reached the semifinals at the WTA 125 Ladies Hamburg Open defeating two seeds en-route, eighth seed Laura Pigossi and second seed Tamara Korpatsch, and returned to the top 125 in the rankings on 12 August 2024.

Ranked No. 122, she qualified for the main draw at the US Open defeating Julia Grabher and then upsetting eighth seed Barbora Krejčíková, her second top-10 win, to advance to the third round of a major for the first time in her career. She lost to 26th seed Paula Badosa in the third round, in a deciding set tiebreak. She returned to the top 100 in the singles rankings, at world No. 93 on 23 September 2024.

Alongside Monica Niculescu, she won the doubles draw at the Hong Kong 125 Open in October, defeating Nao Hibino and Makoto Ninomiya in the final. Partnering Niculescu, Ruse won the doubles title at the WTA 125 Open Angers, defeating Belinda Bencic and Celine Naef in the final.

=== 2025: WTA 1000 third round, first grass-court final ===
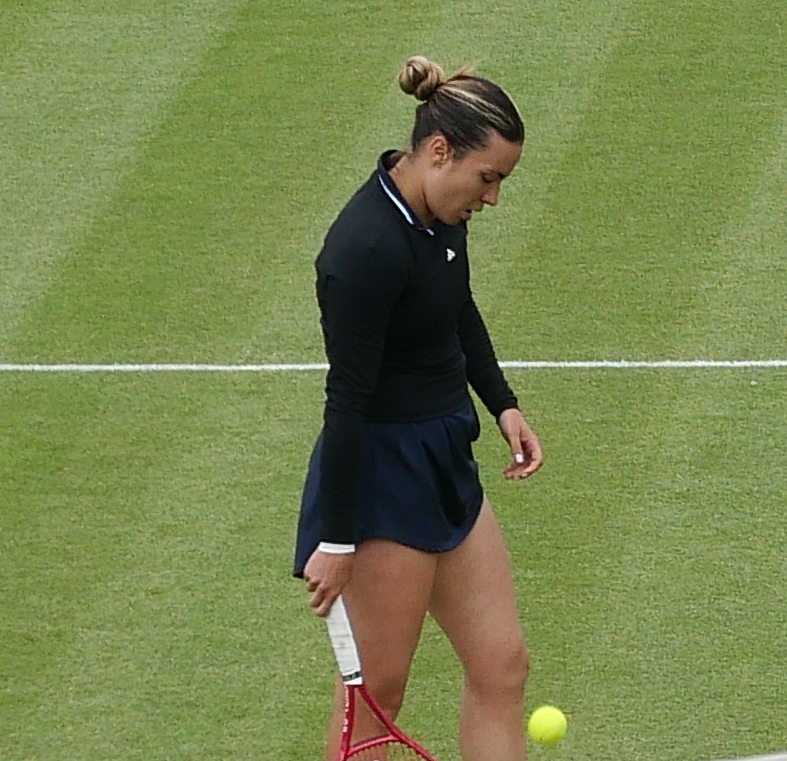
Ruse at the 2026 Rosmalen Open

Ruse defeated wildcard entrant Elsa Jacquemot, qualifier Camilla Rosatello and lucky loser Jessika Ponchet to reach the semifinals at the Rouen Open, in which she lost to top seed and eventual champion Elina Svitolina.

She qualified for the WTA 1000 Italian Open and defeated Polina Kudermetova to make it through to the second round, where she lost to 29th seed Danielle Collins.

In June, Ruse qualified for the grass-court Rosmalen Open and went on to reach the final, losing to third seed Elise Mertens.

=== 2026: WTA 500 semifinals, back to top 75 ===
At the Australian Open, Ruse defeated 26th seed Dayana Yastremska and Ajla Tomljanović to make it into the third round, where her run was ended by eighth seed Mirra Andreeva. In April at the WTA 500 Linz Open, she reached the semifinals, defeating fourth seed Jeļena Ostapenko en route, but lost to top seed and eventual champion Mirra Andreeva in the last four.

In June at the Rosmalen Open, Ruse recorded wins over Tamara Korpatsch and, in a reversal of the previous year's final, third seed Elise Mertens to make it through to the quarterfinals, at which point she lost to eighth seed Barbora Krejčíková. At the WTA 500 Bad Homburg Open, she reached again the semifinals, as a qualifier, defeating top-10 player Linda Nosková en route, but lost to eventual champion, Karolína Muchová.

== Performance timelines ==
Key
W	F	SF	QF	#R	RR	Q#	P#	DNQ	A	Z#	PO	G	S	B	NMS	NTI	P	NH

(W) winner; (F) finalist; (SF) semifinalist; (QF) quarterfinalist; (#R) rounds 4, 3, 2, 1; (RR) round-robin stage; (Q#) qualification round; (P#) preliminary round; (DNQ) did not qualify; (A) absent; (Z#) Davis/Fed Cup Zonal Group (with number indication) or (PO) play-off; (G) gold, (S) silver or (B) bronze Olympic/Paralympic medal; (NMS) not a Masters tournament; (NTI) not a Tier I tournament; (P) postponed; (NH) not held; (SR) strike rate (events won / competed); (W–L) win–loss record.
To avoid confusion and double counting, these charts are updated at the conclusion of a tournament or when the player's participation has ended.

Only main-draw results in WTA Tour, Grand Slam tournaments, Billie Jean King Cup, United Cup, Hopman Cup and Olympic Games are included in win–loss records.

=== Singles ===
Current through the 2026 Wimbledon.

Tournament	2016	2017	2018	2019	2020	2021	2022	2023	2024	2025	2026	SR	W–L	Win %
Grand Slam tournaments
Australian Open	A	A	A	A	Q3	A	2R	Q2	A	2R	3R	0 / 3	4–3	57%
French Open	A	A	A	A	Q3	Q2	1R	Q2	Q3	2R	1R	0 / 3	1–3	25%
Wimbledon	A	A	1R	1R	NH	Q1	1R	Q2	1R	1R	1R	0 / 6	0–6	0%
US Open	A	A	Q1	Q3	A	1R	2R	1R	3R	1R	1R	0 / 6	3–6	38%
Win–loss	0–0	0–0	0–1	0–1	0–0	0–1	2–4	0–1	2–2	2–4	2–4	0 / 18	8–18	31%
National representation
BJK Cup (Note: Formerly known as Fed Cup until 2020.)	A	A	A	A	QR (Note: Edition is split into the two years due to COVID-19.)		A	A	1R	A		0 / 0	1–1	50%
WTA 1000
Qatar Open (Note: The first Premier 5 event of the year has switched back and forth between the Dubai Tennis Championships and the Qatar Ladies Open from 2009 until 2024. Dubai was classified as a Premier 5 event from 2009 to 2011 before being succeeded by Doha for the 2012–2014 period. In 2015, Dubai regained its Premier 5 status while Doha was demoted to Premier status. The Premier 5 tournaments were reclassified as WTA 1000 tournaments in 2021.)	A	A	A	A	A	A	A	A	A	1R	A	0 / 1	0–1	0%
Dubai	A	A	A	A	A	A	A	A	A	Q1	1R	0 / 1	0–1	0%
Indian Wells	A	A	A	A	NH	1R	1R	Q2	A	A	1R	0 / 3	0–3	0%
Miami Open	A	A	A	A	NH	A	2R	A	A	3R	2R	0 / 3	4–3	57%
Madrid Open	A	A	A	A	NH	A	A	1R	A	Q1	2R	0 / 2	1–2	33%
Italian Open	A	A	A	A	A	A	2R	2R	A	2R	2R (Note: 1R bye, LL entry 2R)	0 / 4	3–4	43%
Canadian Open	A	A	A	A	NH	A	A	A	A	1R	2R	0 / 2	1–2	33%
Cincinnati Open	A	A	A	A	A	Q2	A	A	A	1R	2R	0 / 2	1–2	33%
Wuhan Open	A	A	A	A	NH				A	A		0 / 0	0–0	–
China Open	A	A	A	A	NH			A	1R	2R		0 / 2	1–2	33%
Win–loss	0–0	0–0	0–0	0–0	0–0	0–1	2–3	1–2	0–1	4–6	4–7	0 / 18	9–18	33%
Career statistics
	2016	2017	2018	2019	2020	2021	2022	2023	2024	2025	2026	SR	W–L	Win %
Tournaments	1	1	4	4	1	7	19	8	7	15	16	Career total: 81		
Titles	0	0	0	0	0	1	0	0	0	0	0	Career total: 1		
Finals	0	0	0	0	0	2	0	1	0	1	0	Career total: 4		
Hard win–loss	0–0	0–0	0–0	0–1	0–1	3–4	7–10	6–6	2–4	4–10	3–7	0 / 45	27–45	38%
Clay win–loss	0–1	1–1	1–2	0–1	0–1	8–2	1–6	1–2	3–2	5–3	4–4	1 / 25	24–25	49%
Grass win–loss	0–0	0–0	0–2	2–2	0–0	0–0	1–3	0–0	0–1	4–2	5–3	0 / 13	12–13	48%
Overall win–loss	0–1	1–1	1–4	2–4	0–2	11–6	9–19	7–8	5–7	13–15	12–14	1 / 83	63–83	43%
Year-end ranking (Note: 2015: WTA ranking-642.)	254	265	243	182	177	85	104	125	90	88		$3,815,950		

=== Doubles ===
Current through the 2026 US Open.

Tournament	2015	2016	2017	2018	2019	2020	2021	2022	2023	2024	2025	2026	SR	W–L	Win %
Grand Slam tournaments
Australian Open	A	A	A	A	A	A	A	1R	SF	A	QF	A	0 / 3	7–3	70%
French Open	A	A	A	A	A	A	A	QF	3R	SF	A	A	0 / 3	9–3	75%
Wimbledon	A	A	A	A	A	A	A	1R	2R	3R	2R	3R	0 / 5	6–5	55%
US Open	A	A	A	A	A	A	QF	1R	3R	2R	3R	2R	0 / 6	9–6	60%
Win–loss	0–0	0–0	0–0	0–0	0–0	0–0	3–1	3–4	9–4	7–3	6–3	3–2	0 / 17	31–17	65%
National representation
BJK Cup	A	A	A	A	A	QR		A	A	1R	A		0 / 1	0–1	0%
WTA 1000
Qatar Open	A	A	A	A	A	A	A	A	A	A	1R	A	0 / 1	0–1	0%
Dubai	A	A	A	A	A	A	A	A	A	A	A	SF	0 / 1	3–1	75%
Indian Wells	A	A	A	A	A	NH	2R	A	1R	A	A	1R	0 / 3	1–3	25%
Miami Open	A	A	A	A	A	NH	A	A	A	A	A	A	0 / 0	0–0	–
Madrid Open	A	A	A	A	A	NH	A	A	SF	A	A	A	0 / 1	2–1	67%
Italian Open	A	A	A	A	A	A	A	2R	2R	A	2R	A	0 / 3	3–3	50%
Canadian Open	A	A	A	A	A	NH	A	A	A	A	A	A	0 / 0	0–0	–
Cincinnati Open	A	A	A	A	A	A	A	A	A	A	1R	A	0 / 1	0–1	0%
Wuhan Open	A	A	A	A	A	NH			A	A	A		0 / 0	0–0	–
China Open	A	A	A	A	A	NH			A	A	A		0 / 0	0–0	–
Win–loss	0–0	0–0	0–0	0–0	0–0	0–0	1–1	1–1	3–3	0–0	1–3	3–1	0 / 9	9–9	50%
Career statistics
	2015	2016	2017	2018	2019	2020	2021	2022	2023	2024	2025	2026	SR	W–L	Win %
Tournaments	1	1	1	2	4	1	4	10	10	5	9	2	Career total: 50		
Titles	0	0	0	0	0	0	0	0	0	0	0	0	Career total: 0		
Finals	0	0	0	0	1	0	0	0	0	0	0	0	Career total: 1		
Overall win–loss	0–1	1–1	0–1	3–2	8–4	0–2	6–4	7–8	17–10	7–5	10–9	5–2	0 / 49	59–49	55%
Year-end ranking	575	250	285	200	119	124	99	93	37	62	77				

== WTA Tour finals ==
=== Singles: 4 (1 title, 3 runner-ups) ===
Legend WTA 1000 WTA 500 WTA 250 (1–3)	Finals by surface Hard (0–1) Clay (1–1) Grass (0–1)	Finals by setting Outdoor (1–2) Indoor (0–1)

Result	W–L	Date	Tournament	Tier	Surface	Opponent	Score
Win	1–0	Jul 2021	Hamburg European Open, Germany	WTA 250	Clay	(Germany) Andrea Petkovic	7–6^{(8–6)}, 6–4
Loss	1–1	Jul 2021	Palermo Ladies Open, Italy	WTA 250	Clay	(United States) Danielle Collins	4–6, 2–6
Loss	1–2	Oct 2023	Transylvania Open, Romania	WTA 250	Hard (i)	(Germany) Tamara Korpatsch	3–6, 4–6
Loss	1–3	Jun 2025	Rosmalen Open, Netherlands	WTA 250	Grass	(Belgium) Elise Mertens	3–6, 6–7^{(3–7)}

=== Doubles: 1 (runner-up) ===
Legend WTA 250 (0–1)	Finals by surface Clay (0–1)

Result	Date	Tournament	Tier	Surface	Partner	Opponents	Score
Loss	Jul 2019	Bucharest Open, Romania	International (Note: The WTA International tournaments were reclassified as WTA 250 tournaments in 2021.)	Clay	(Romania) Jaqueline Cristian	(Slovakia) Viktória Kužmová (Czech Republic) Kristýna Plíšková	4–6, 6–7^{(3–7)}

== ITF Circuit finals ==
=== Singles: 10 (7 titles, 3 runner-ups) ===
Legend $50/75,000 tournaments (1–1) $25,000 tournaments (1–1) $10/15,000 tournaments (5–1)	Finals by surface Hard (1–2) Clay (6–1)

Result	W–L	Date	Tournament	Tier	Surface	Opponent	Score
Win	1–0	Dec 2015	ITF Antalya, Turkey	10,000	Clay	(Georgia (country)) Ekaterine Gorgodze	1–6, 7–6^{(3)}, 6–2
Win	2–0	Feb 2016	ITF Antalya, Turkey	10,000	Clay	(France) Josephine Boualem	7–6^{(3)}, 0–6, 6–1
Win	3–0	Feb 2016	ITF Antalya, Turkey	10,000	Clay	(Slovenia) Nina Potočnik	7–5, 4–6, 6–2
Loss	3–1	Mar 2016	ITF Hammamet, Tunisia	10,000	Clay	(Italy) Claudia Giovine	4–6, 0–6
Win	4–1	Apr 2016	ITF Hammamet, Tunisia	10,000	Clay	(Austria) Julia Grabher	6–4, 6–1
Loss	4–2	Oct 2016	Open de Touraine, France	50,000	Hard (i)	(Belgium) Maryna Zanevska	3–6, 3–6
Win	5–2	Aug 2017	ITF Bad Saulgau, Germany	25,000	Clay	(United States) Chiara Scholl	6–1, 6–2
Win	6–2	Aug 2017	ITF Arad, Romania	15,000	Clay	(Slovenia) Nina Potočnik	6–4, 6–1
Loss	6–3	Mar 2019	Yokohama Challenger, Japan	W25	Hard	(Belgium) Greet Minnen	4–6, 1–6
Win	7–3	Nov 2025	Trnava Indoor, Slovakia	W75	Hard (i)	(Czech Republic) Lucie Havlíčková	5–7, 6–4, 6–0

=== Doubles: 20 (11 titles, 9 runner-ups) ===
Legend $100,000 tournaments (2–0) $50/60,000 tournaments (2–2) $25,000 tournaments (3–5) $10,000 tournaments (4–2)	Finals by surface Hard (2–3) Clay (7–6) Grass (2–0)

Result	W–L	Date	Tournament	Tier	Surface	Partner	Opponents	Score
Win	1–0	Aug 2015	ITF Arad, Romania	10,000	Clay	(Romania) Jaqueline Cristian	(Romania) Andreea Ghițescu (Slovakia) Katarína Strešnáková	6–3, 6–4
Loss	1–1	Aug 2015	ITF Bucharest, Romania	10,000	Clay	(Romania) Oana Georgeta Simion	(Romania) Diana Buzean (Romania) Cristina Dinu	0–6, 2–6
Loss	1–2	Dec 2015	ITF Antalya, Turkey	10,000	Clay	(Denmark) Julie Noe	(Ukraine) Alona Fomina (Germany) Christina Shakovets	6–7^{(4)}, 2–6
Win	2–2	Feb 2016	ITF Antalya, Turkey	10,000	Clay	(Bulgaria) Petia Arshinkova	(Greece) Eleni Daniilidou (Uzbekistan) Arina Folts	7–6^{(0)}, 6–4
Win	3–2	Feb 2016	ITF Antalya, Turkey	10,000	Clay	(United States) Dasha Ivanova	(Croatia) Adrijana Lekaj (Bulgaria) Viktoriya Tomova	7–6^{(1)}, 6–1
Win	4–2	Apr 2016	ITF Hammamet, Tunisia	10,000	Clay	(Germany) Katharina Hobgarski	(Egypt) Ola Abou Zekry (India) Snehadevi Reddy	6–4, 6–4
Loss	4–3	Jun 2016	Bredeney Ladies Open, Germany	50,000	Clay	(Belgium) Elyne Boeykens	(Spain) Laura Pous Tió (Germany) Anne Schäfer	2–6, 3–6
Win	5–3	Aug 2017	ITF Hódmezővásárhely, Hungary	25,000	Clay	(Netherlands) Eva Wacanno	(Italy) Martina Di Giuseppe (Italy) Anna-Giulia Remondina	6–3, 6–1
Win	6–3	Sep 2017	ITF Mamaia, Romania	25,000	Clay	(Russia) Anastasiya Komardina	(Bosnia and Herzegovina) Dea Herdželaš (Romania) Oana Georgeta Simion	3–6, 6–1, [10–6]
Loss	6–4	Sep 2017	Sofia Cup, Bulgaria	25,000	Clay	(Greece) Valentini Grammatikopoulou	(Romania) Jaqueline Adina Cristian (Russia) Anastasiya Komardina	3–6, 0–6
Loss	6–5	Oct 2017	Open de Touraine, France	25,000	Hard (i)	(Romania) Jaqueline Cristian	(United Kingdom) Sarah Beth Grey (United Kingdom) Samantha Murray	6–7^{(3)}, 3–6
Win	7–5	Sep 2018	Montreux Ladies Open, Switzerland	60,000	Clay	(Romania) Andreea Mitu	(Brazil) Laura Pigossi (Belgium) Maryna Zanevska	4–6, 6–3, [10–4]
Loss	7–6	Sep 2018	ITF Dobrich, Bulgaria	25,000	Clay	(Romania) Jaqueline Cristian	(Romania) Cristina Dinu (Venezuela) Aymet Uzcategui	6–7^{(3)}, 2–6
Loss	7–7	Jan 2019	Open Andrézieux-Bouthéon, France	W60	Hard (i)	(Romania) Andreea Mitu	(Sweden) Cornelia Lister (Czech Republic) Renata Voráčová	1–6, 2–6
Loss	7–8	Feb 2019	Open de l'Isère, France	W25	Hard (i)	(Romania) Andreea Mitu	(France) Estelle Cascino (France) Elixane Lechemia	2–6, 2–6
Win	8–8	Jan 2020	Open Andrézieux-Bouthéon, France	W60	Hard (i)	(Romania) Jaqueline Cristian	(Cyprus) Raluca Șerban (Georgia (country)) Ekaterine Gorgodze	7–6^{(6)}, 6–7^{(4)}, [10–8]
Win	9–8	Oct 2020	ITF Istanbul, Turkey	W25	Hard (i)	(Romania) Jaqueline Cristian	(United Kingdom) Maia Lumsden (Turkey) Melis Sezer	6–3, 6–4
Loss	9–9	May 2021	ITF Prague, Czech Republic	W25	Hard (i)	(Switzerland) Xenia Knoll	(Hungary) Anna Bondár (Belgium) Kimberley Zimmermann	6–7^{(5)}, 2–6
Win	10–9	Jun 2021	Nottingham Trophy, United Kingdom	W100	Grass	(Romania) Monica Niculescu	(Australia) Priscilla Hon (Australia) Storm Sanders	7–5, 7–5
Win	11–9	Jun 2024	Ilkley Trophy, United Kingdom	W100	Grass	(France) Kristina Mladenovic	(United States) Quinn Gleason (China) Tang Qianhui	6–2, 6–2

== Top 10 wins ==
=== Record against top-10 players ===
- She has a 3–4 (43%) record against players who were, at the time the match was played, ranked in the top 10.

#.	Player	Rank	Event	Surface	Round	Score	Rank
2022
1.	(Spain) Paula Badosa	No. 5	Dubai Championships, UAE	Hard	1R	6–3, 5–7, 6–4	No. 59
2024
2.	(Czech Republic) Barbora Krejčíková	No. 8	US Open, United States	Hard	2R	6–4, 7–5	No. 122
2026
3.	(Czech Republic) Linda Nosková	No. 10	Bad Homburg, Germany	Grass	1R	6–1, 6–3	No. 105
