= Irina Fetecău =

Romanian tennis player (born 1996)

- Country (sports): Romania
- Born: 17 April 1996 (age 30) Romania
- Plays: Right (two-handed backhand)
- Prize money: $186,310

Singles
- Career record: 290–209
- Career titles: 3 ITF
- Highest ranking: No. 207 (6 December 2021)
- Current ranking: No. 1,314 (29 June 2026)

Grand Slam singles results
- Australian Open: Q1 (2022)
- Wimbledon: Q1 (2021)
- US Open: Q1 (2021)

Doubles
- Career record: 87–96
- Career titles: 4 ITF
- Highest ranking: No. 310 (28 January 2019)
- Last updated on: 30 June 2026.

Irina Fetecău (born 17 April 1996) is a Romanian professional tennis player.

In her career, Fetecău has won three singles and four doubles titles on the ITF Women's Circuit. On 6 December 2021, she achieved her career-high singles ranking of world No. 207. On 28 January 2019, she peaked at No. 310 in the doubles rankings.

Fetecău made her WTA Tour main-draw debut at the 2019 Bucharest Open, having been handed a wildcard into the doubles event, partnering fellow Romanian Georgia Crăciun.

In April 2025, she was given a 10-month suspension from tennis after providing a positive doping test. Her sample contained the banned stimulant 4-Methylpentan-2-amin which the International Tennis Integrity Agency accepted she had accidentally ingested via a contaminated supplement. Fetecău's ban will end on 24 February 2026.

== Grand Slam singles performance timelines ==
Key
W	F	SF	QF	#R	RR	Q#	DNQ	A	NH

(W) winner; (F) finalist; (SF) semifinalist; (QF) quarterfinalist; (#R) rounds 4, 3, 2, 1; (RR) round-robin stage; (Q#) qualification round; (DNQ) did not qualify; (A) absent; (NH) not held; (SR) strike rate (events won / competed); (W–L) win–loss record.
To avoid confusion and double counting, these charts are updated at the conclusion of a tournament or when the player's participation has ended.

Tournament	2021	2022	W–L
Australian Open	A	Q1	0–0
French Open	A	A	0–0
Wimbledon	Q1	A	0–0
US Open	Q1	A	0–0
Win–loss	0–0	0–0	0–0

== ITF Circuit finals ==
=== Singles: 12 (3 titles, 9 runner-ups) ===
Legend
W25/35 tournaments (2–3)
W10/15 tournaments (1–6)

Result	W–L	Date	Tournament	Tier	Surface	Opponent	Score
Loss	0–1	Aug 2015	ITF Târgu Jiu, Romania	W10	Clay	(Italy) Martina Spigarelli	6–2, 1–6, 4–6
Loss	0–2	Jun 2016	ITF Galați, Romania	W10	Clay	(Moldova) Alexandra Perper	2–6, 6–7^{(4)}
Loss	0–3	Apr 2017	ITF Cairo, Egypt	W15	Clay	(Bosnia and Herzegovina) Dea Herdželaš	3–6, 1–6
Loss	0–4	Sep 2017	ITF Hammamet, Tunisia	W15	Clay	(Colombia) María Herazo González	6–1, 5–7, 2–6
Win	1–4	Apr 2018	ITF Cairo, Egypt	W15	Clay	(Ecuador) Charlotte Römer	6–1, 6–1
Loss	1–5	Feb 2019	ITF Antalya, Turkey	W15	Clay	(Russia) Victoria Kan	2–6, 2–6
Loss	1–6	Nov 2019	ITF Orlando, United States	W25	Clay	(Netherlands) Arantxa Rus	3–6, 2–6
Win	2–6	Feb 2020	ITF Nonthaburi, Thailand	W25	Hard	(Romania) Patricia Maria Țig	6–3, ret.
Loss	2–7	May 2021	ITF Naples, United States	W25	Clay	(Hungary) Panna Udvardy	0–6, 3–6
Win	3–7	Nov 2021	ITF Daytona Beach, United States	W25	Clay	(United States) Alycia Parks	6–1, 6–2
Loss	3–8	Feb 2024	ITF Nakhon, Thailand	W35	Clay	(Thailand) Peangtarn Plipuech	6–2, 3–6, 2–6
Loss	3–9	Mar 2025	ITF Alaminos, Cyprus	W15	Clay	(Switzerland) Jenny Dürst	3–6, 6–3, 3–6

=== Doubles: 8 (4 titles, 4 runner-ups) ===
Legend
W25 tournaments (3–1)
W10/15 tournaments (1–3)

Result	W–L	Date	Tournament	Tier	Surface	Partner	Opponents	Score
Loss	0–1	Nov 2015	ITF Casablanca, Morocco	W10	Clay	(Romania) Camelia Hristea	(Spain) Olga Parres Azcoitia (Italy) Camilla Rosatello	4–6, 3–6
Loss	0–2	Jul 2016	ITF Iași, Romania	W10	Clay	(France) Kassandra Davesne	(Romania) Elena-Teodora Cadar (Italy) Giorgia Marchetti	6–7^{(7)}, 7–6^{(1)}, [9–11]
Win	1–2	Apr 2017	ITF Cairo, Egypt	W15	Clay	(Czech Republic) Anna Slováková	(Georgia (country)) Mariam Bolkvadze (Belgium) Margaux Bovy	7–6^{(2)}, 2–6, [10–5]
Win	2–2	Apr 2018	ITF Canberra, Australia	W25	Clay	(Australia) Kaylah McPhee	(Austria) Pia König (Japan) Michika Ozeki	6–1, 4–6 [10–5]
Win	3–2	Jul 2018	ITF Stuttgart, Germany	W25	Clay	(Venezuela) Aymet Uzcátegui	(Bosnia and Herzegovina) Anita Husarić (Australia) Tammi Patterson	6–2, 3–6, [10–4]
Loss	3–3	Feb 2019	ITF Antalya, Turkey	W15	Clay	(Romania) Cristina Dinu	(Italy) Gaia Sanesi (Italy) Camilla Scala	7–6^{(4)}, 4–6, [8–10]
Win	4–3	Sep 2019	ITF St. Pölten, Austria	W25	Clay	(Hungary) Panna Udvardy	(Hungary) Anna Bondár (Hungary) Réka Luca Jani	7–6^{(5)}, 0–6, [11–9]
Loss	4–4	Jan 2022	ITF Sharm El Sheikh, Egypt	W25	Hard	(Switzerland) Simona Waltert	(Netherlands) Isabelle Haverlag (Lithuania) Justina Mikulskyte	1–6, 2–6
