= Cibulka =

Cibulka (feminine: Cibulková) is a Czech and Slovak surname. The word cibulka is a diminutive of cibule, meaning 'onion'. The surname could refer to an onion grower or seller, but also to someone whose plump figure resembled an onion. Notable people with the surname include:

- Dominika Cibulková (born 1989), Slovak tennis player
- Franz Cibulka (1946–2016), Austrian composer
- Hanns Cibulka (1920–2004), German poet
- Heinz Cibulka (born 1942), Austrian photographer
- Katarína Cibulková (born 1962), Slovak politician
- Katharina Cibulka (born 1975), Austrian filmmaker and artist
- Petr Cibulka (born 1950), Czech politician
- Vilma Cibulková (born 1963), Czech actress

== See also ==
- Czibulka
