= Katharina Cibulka =

Austrian artist (born 1975)

- Born: 1975 (age 50–51); Innsbruck, Austria
- Education: Academy of Fine Arts Vienna
- Notable work: "SOLANGE" installations
- Website: www.katharina-cibulka.com

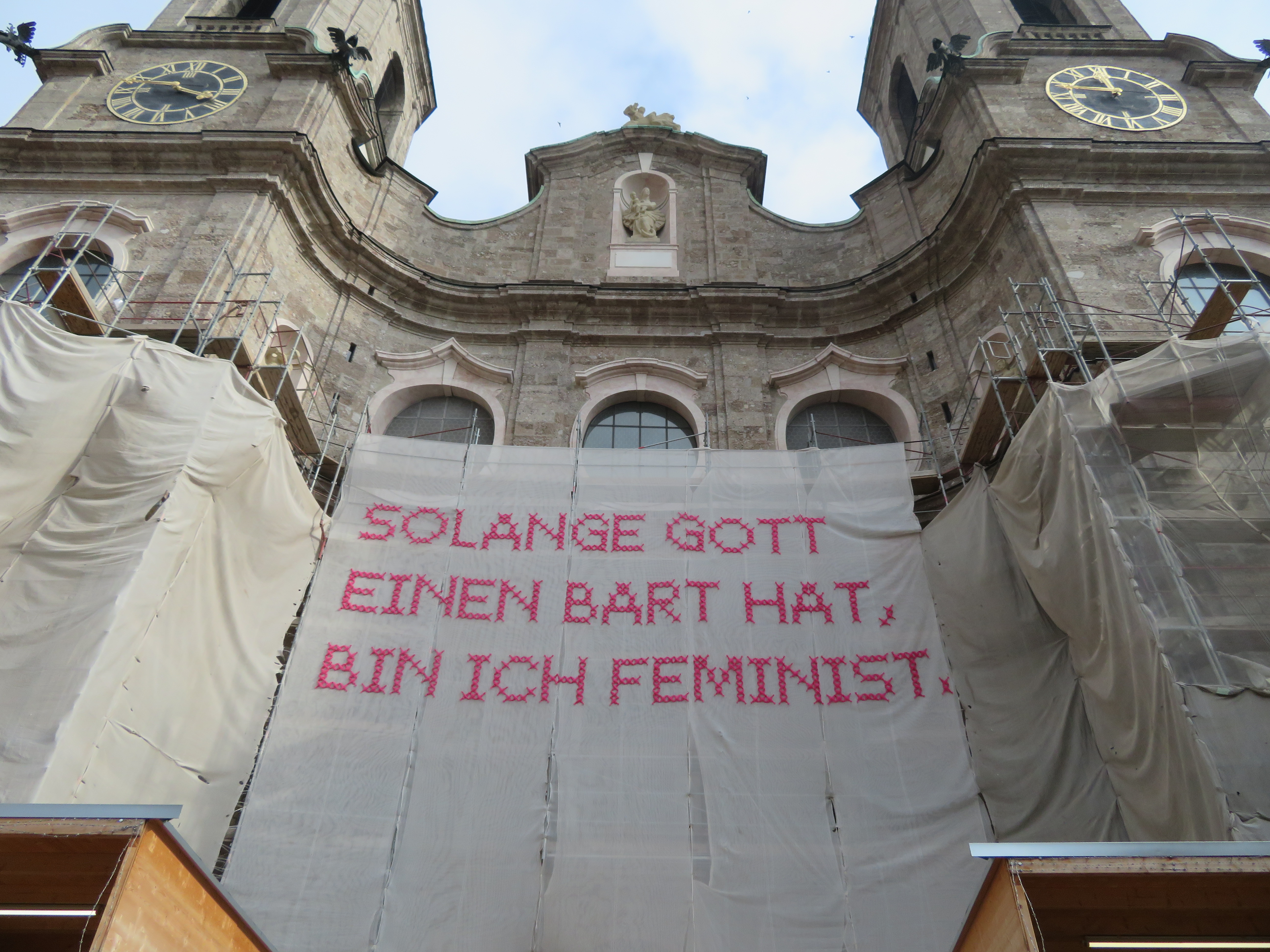
"Solange Gott einen Bart hat, bin ich Feminist" ("As long as God has a beard, I'm a feminist"), Innsbruck Cathedral

External videos
- Katharina Cibulka: Making SOLANGE #27 for NMWA, 2022.

Katharina Cibulka (born 1975) is an Austrian feminist artist, filmmaker and photographer whose work addresses gender-based inequity and power structures through public art projects such as her series of installations "SOLANGE" (German for "as long as"). For her SOLANGE installations, Cibulka covers scaffolding at construction sites with monumental cross-stitch messages in bright pink tulle on white mesh fabric, following the pattern "As long as ... I will be a feminist." At least 27 SOLANGE installations have appeared in at least 21 cities, in countries including Austria, Slovenia, Morocco, Germany, and the United States. In 2021, Cibulka received the Tyrolean Prize for Contemporary Art from the State of Tyrol.

== Education ==
Katharina Cibulka was born in Innsbruck, Austria, in 1975.

Cibulka has studied at the New York Film Academy (1999), the School for Artistic Photography in Vienna, founded by Friedl Kubelka, (2000–01), and the Academy of Fine Arts Vienna (2004–10). In 2010 Cibulka received her diploma in performance art from the Academy of Fine Arts in Vienna, after submitting the video Getting my name up there.

== Video works ==
Cibulka's video Getting my name up there is based on two films made in New York, interviewing five musicians ten years apart. The film focuses on their personal development and the changes in their goals. Another video, "Do not leave any traces", documented the words before and after they were painted on a wall of the exhibition room.

Cibulka had solo shows at the Ursula Blickle Video Lounge of the Kunsthalle Wien in 2006, and at Andechs Galleries in Innsbruck in 2011.

== Installations ==
Cibulka began developing the "SOLANGE" series in 2016. She intentionally chose to place a traditional female practice – cross-stitch – into a traditionally male setting – a construction site. On the protective covering of the scaffolding at construction sites, Cibulka writes monumental messages in cross-stitch using pink tulle on white mesh. Messages follow the pattern "As long as ... I will be a feminist." The messages chosen for her works are often developed through discussion with local communities.

"As long as the art market is a boys’ club, I will be a feminist." appeared at the Academy of Fine Arts in Vienna in 2018. The Academy, Cibulka's alma mater, is the only university in Europe or the United States that has achieved an equal gender ratio in its staff and students. The message challenged the imbalance towards male artists in the international art market as identified by the Guerrilla Girls and others. Other messages have appeared in at least 21 cities, including the twin cities of Innsbruck, Austria and Freiburg, Germany; Landek, Austria; Tuchlauben, Golden Quarter, Vienna; Ljubljana, Slovenia and Rabat, Morocco.

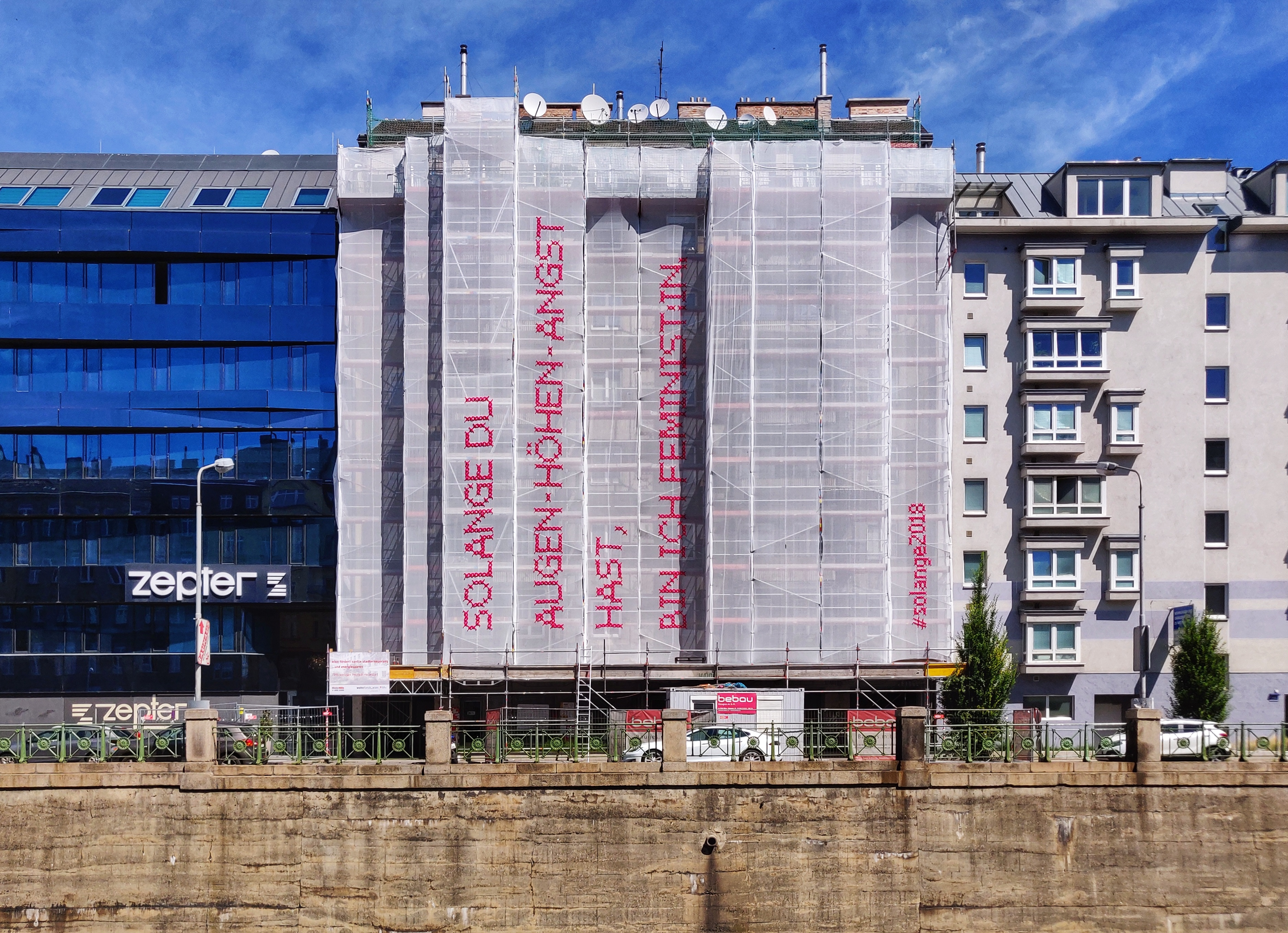
"As long as you are afraid of being eye-level, I will be a feminist", Wohnhausanlage Mollardgasse, Vienna, Austria

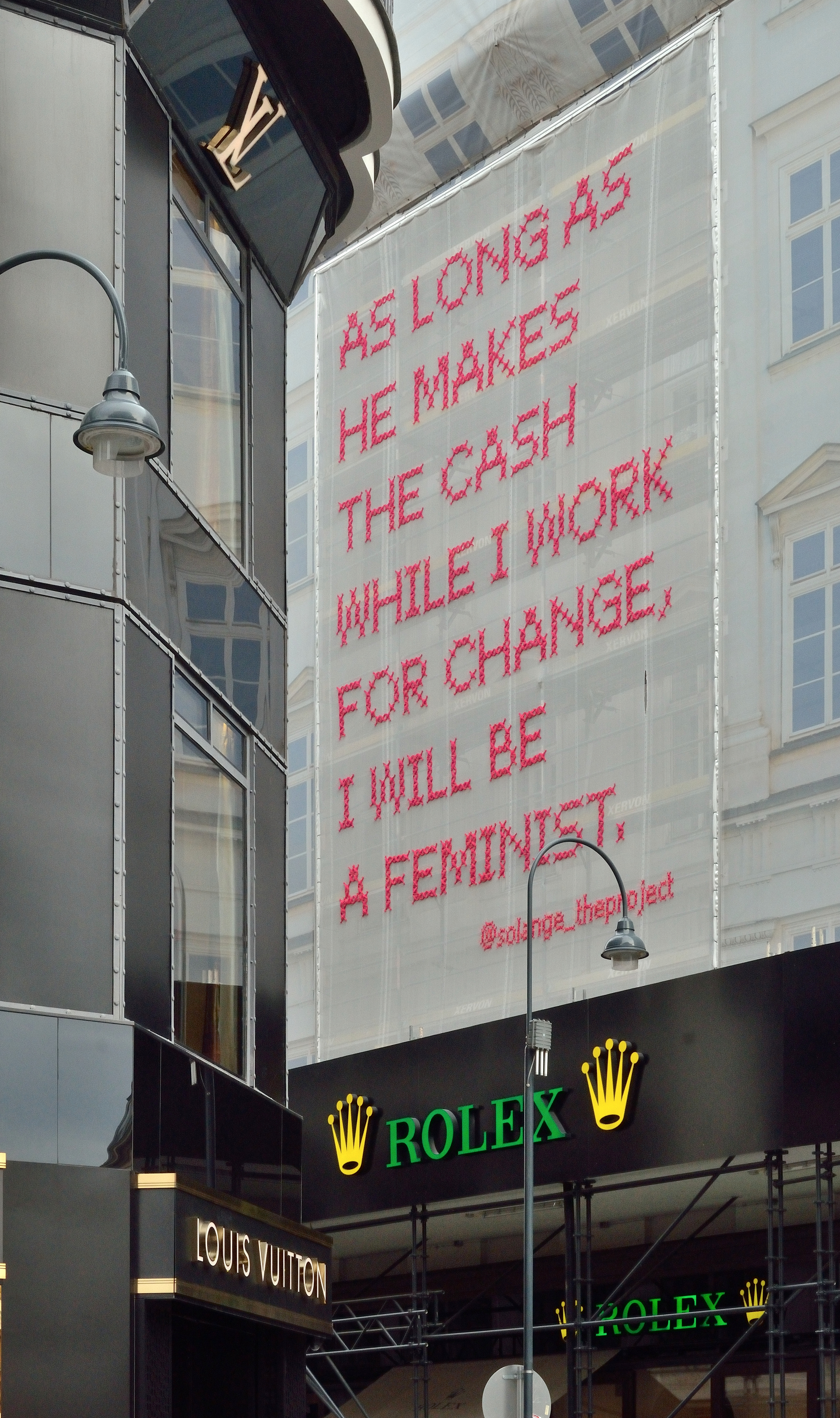
"As long as he makes the cash while I work for change, I will be a feminist.", Tuchlauben, Vienna, Austria

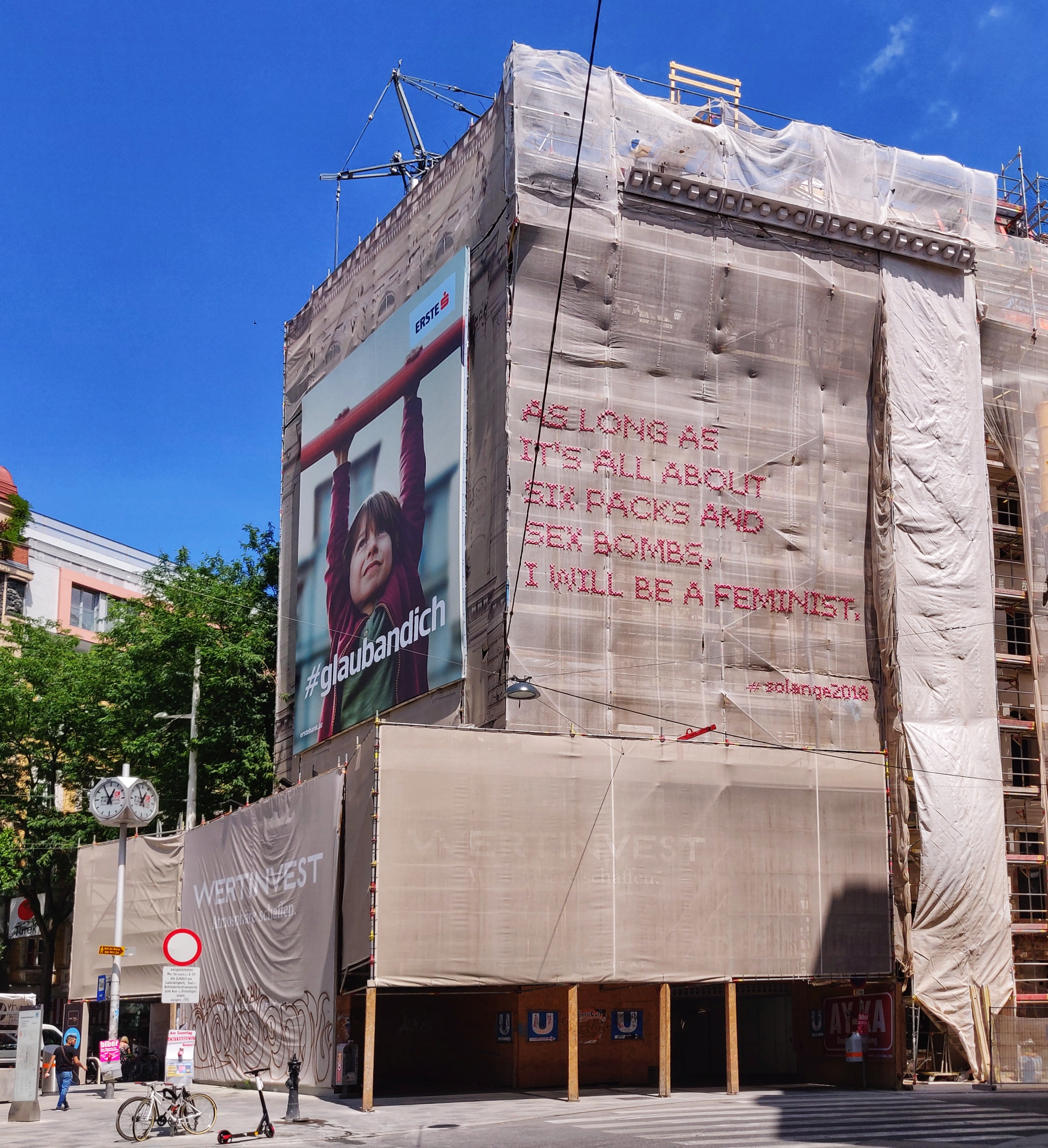
"As long as it's all about six packs and sex bombs, I will be a feminist.", Hotel Kummer, Mariahilf, Vienna

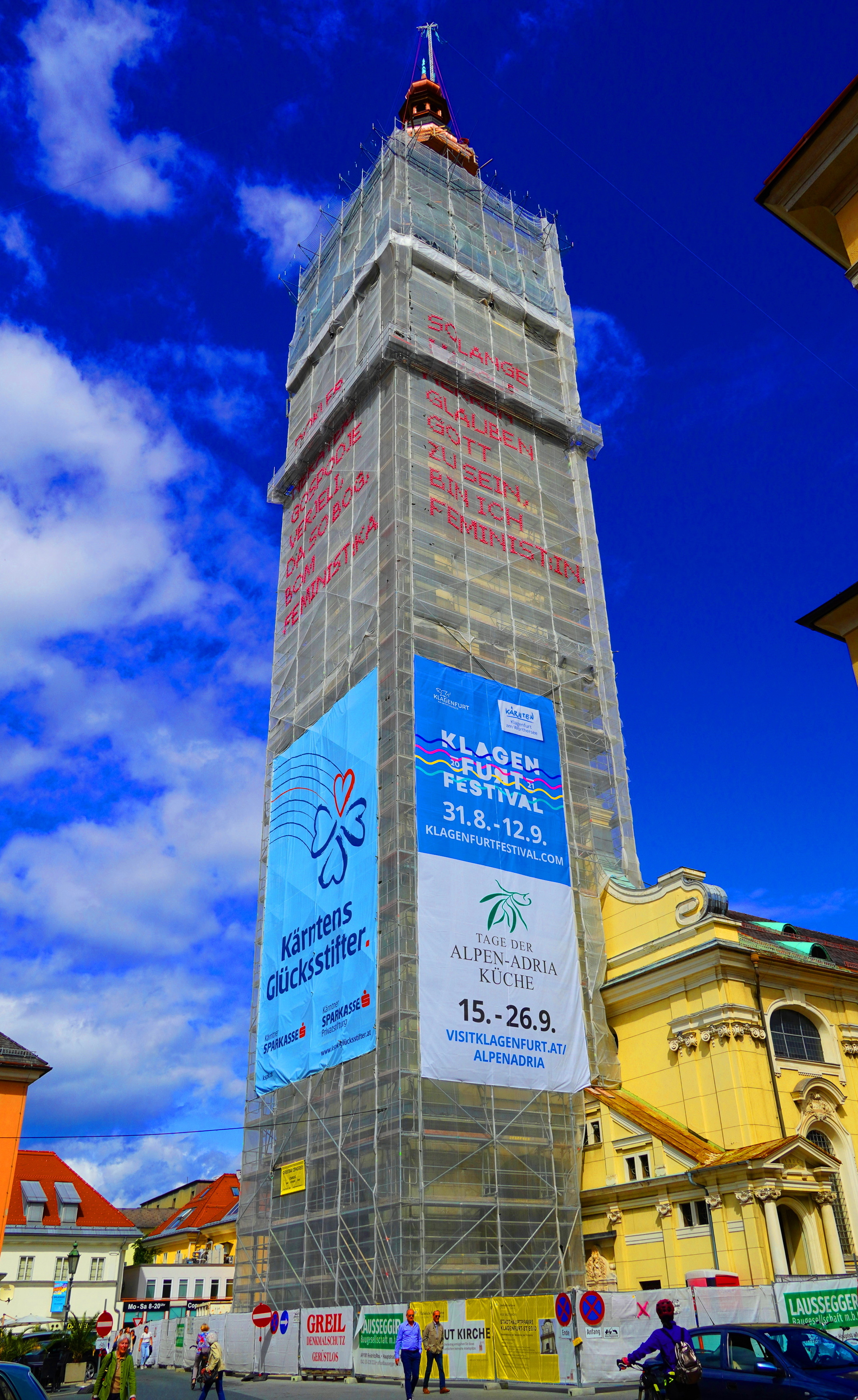
"As long as some men believe they are God, I will be a feminist.", Church of St. Egid, Klagenfurt am Wörthersee, Austria

On 4 May 2021, the message "As long as the hope we spread is stronger than the fear we face, I will be a feminist" in Ljubljana, the capitol of Slovenia, was partially destroyed by vandals. The work had been installed at Cukrarna, a former sugar refinery turned art gallery. It was part of a larger exhibition of sixteen artists, "When Gesture Becomes Event", which opened on 30 April 2021. After the destruction the words "Hope... fear... we face" remained. The City Art Gallery of Ljubljana requested that the damaged work continue to be displayed "as a mirror to all of us, reminding us where we’re heading as a society and how much fear is still present among us".

Cibulka's first installation in the United States, part of the SOLANGE series, covers the north-facing façade of the National Museum of Women in the Arts in Washington, D.C. It carries the message (in English) "As long as generations change but our struggles stay the same, I will be a feminist." Cibulka followed Miss Chelove as one of several women artists who were chosen to present monumental works in the National Museum of Women in the Arts' Lookout series of installations while the museum is being renovated.

Cibulka serves on the board of the Tyrolean Artists' Association (Tiroler Künstlerschaft).

== Exhibitions ==
Works by Cibulka have been included in exhibitions and film festivals such as the Neue Galerie, Innsbruck; Fotogalerie Wien, Vienna; St. Claude Gallery, New Orleans Glucksman Gallery, Cork; Golden Thread Gallery, Belfast; Kunstverein, Bonn; and Künstlerhaus, Vienna.

== Awards ==
Awards received include:

- 2021, Tyrolean Prize for Contemporary Art, State of Tyrol
- 2020, Hilde Zach Art Scholarship of the City of Innsbruck
