= Czibulka =

Czibulka or Czybulka is a surname, a Germanised form of the Czech surname Cibulka. Notable people with the surname include:

- Alphons Czibulka (1842–1894), Austrian-Hungarian composer
- Alfons von Czibulka (1888–1969), Czech-Austrian writer and painter
