= Cita Sadeli =

American artist

Cita Sadeli (also known as Miss Chelove or CHELOVE) is a D.C.-based art director, muralist, designer and illustrator. Sadeli has worked with the D.C. Commission on the Arts and Humanities and the Smithsonian Institution.

== Personal life ==
Sadeli was born in Bloomington, Indiana. Sadeli's family moved to the Washington, D.C., area when she was four, and she grew up in Hyattsville, Maryland. She has cultural ties to Java, Indonesia.

== Career ==
Sadeli was the co-founder of Protein Media, an interactive art agency based in Washington, D.C., and Brooklyn, NY, from 2000-2013.

Sadeli's mural was one of six original pieces to populate the D.C. Alley Museum at its opening in 2015. In 2016, Sadeli completed a commission for &pizza's Washington, D.C., Chinatown location. Sadeli is one of the many artists who worked on a collaborative 400-foot piece called “Mural23". In 2017, she finished a commission for the Mexican restaurant, La Puerta Verde, that included animal masks and cacti. Sadeli designed artwork for the 2017 Smithsonian Folklife festival. In 2018, she completed a colorful, floral mural on the Unity Health Care building to celebrate the cultural diversity of Columbia Heights for the D.C. Commission on the Arts and Humanities' initiative MuralsDC. Sadeli completed another mural for Murals DC titled “You Are Welcome” (3020 14th St.). Her piece "She Smiles 100 Suns" is located near Kennedy St NW in Washington, D.C.

In 2020, Sadeli completed “Guardians of the Four Directions,” a seven-story painting of two warrior women on the outside of Hotel Zena in Thomas Circleduring the beginning of the COVID-19 pandemic. She also completed a mural depicting Zitkala-Sa (meaning “Red Bird”) and suffragist Mary Church Terrell to commemorate the contributions of the Native and African-American communities in the D.C. area.

In 2021, Sadeli painted “Crossroads" in collaboration with Colbert Kennedy and Pose 2 (Maxx Moses) that depicted Asian-style demons racing cyclists on the adjacent Metropolitan Branch Trail in NoMa.

Sadeli is one of several women artists who were chosen to present monumental works in the National Museum of Women in the Arts's Lookout series of installations while the museum was being renovated. In 2022, Chelove's four-story mural Reseeded: A Forest Floor Flow was printed on mesh fabric and displayed over the scaffolding on the museum’s façade. It showed a woman surrounded by Indonesian botanicals, emphasizing the importance of the natural world, women, and ecological activism.
