= Katarína Cibulková =

Slovak politician (born 1962)

Member of the National Council
- In office 4 July 2006 – 4 April 2012

Personal details
- Born: 14 January 1962 (age 64) Vráble, Czechoslovakia (now Slovakia)
- Party: Slovak Democratic and Christian Union – Democratic Party
- Spouse: Milan Cibulka
- Children: Dominika Cibulková
- Education: Comenius University

Katarína Cibulková (born 14 January 1962 in Vráble) is a Slovak politician, former member of the National Council in the Slovak Democratic and Christian Union – Democratic Party caucus.

Cibulková graduated in law from the Comenius University in 1984. She worked as in house counsel and from 1996 an attorney. Between 2006 and 2012 she served as an MP of the National Council.

In 1998-2010 she served as a town councilor in Piešťany. In 2009-2013 she served as a member of the Trnava region assembly.

Together with her husband Milan she has one daughter - the tennis player Dominika Cibulková. In 2010 she was penalized by the Speaker of the National Council for missing votes due to attending her daughter's matches.
