= Dominika Cibulková =

Slovak tennis player

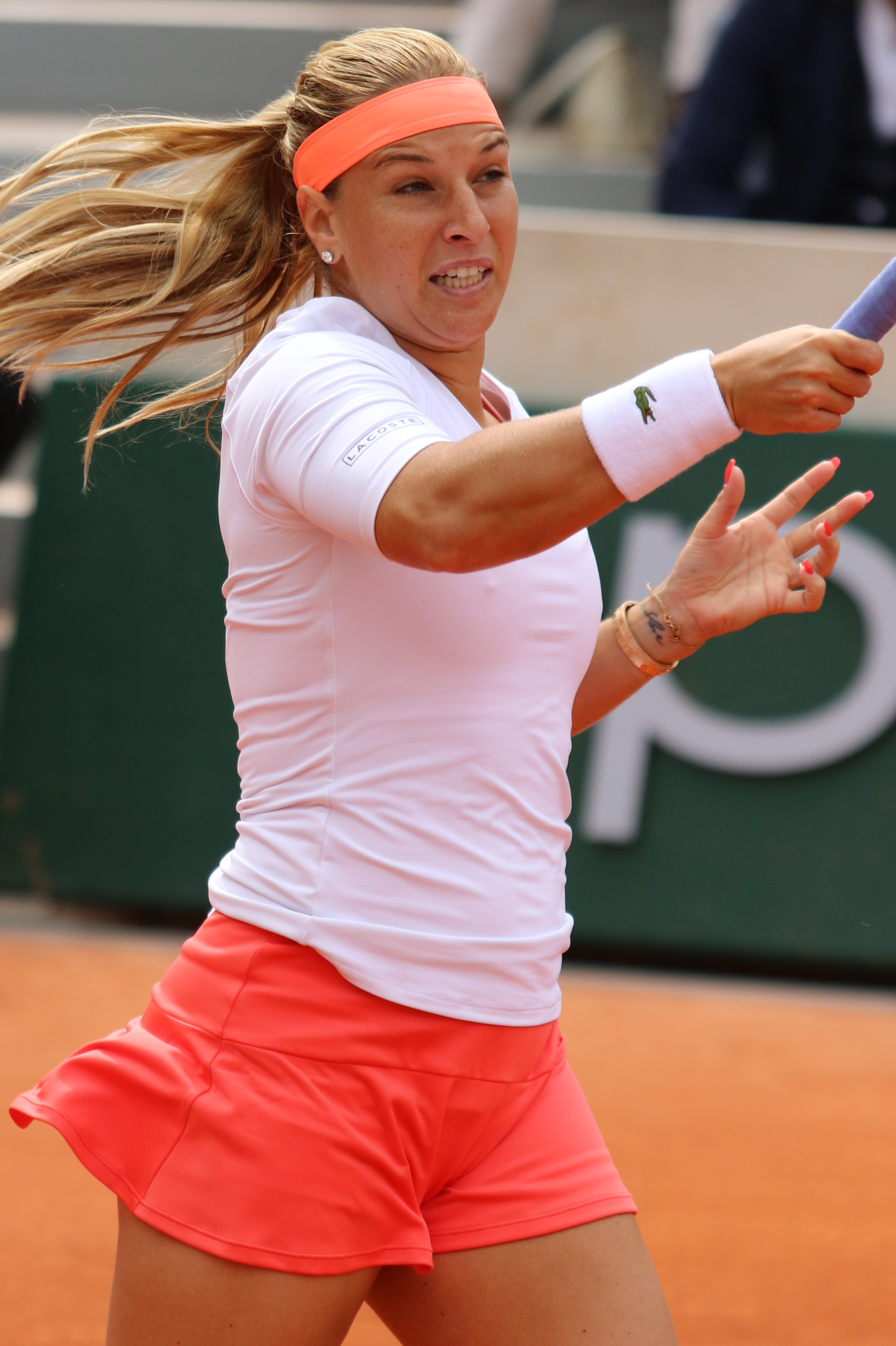
- Cibulková at the 2019 French Open
- Full name: Dominika Navara Cibulková
- Country (sports): Slovakia
- Residence: Dubai, United Arab Emirates
- Born: 6 May 1989 (age 37) Bratislava, Czechoslovakia
- Height: 1.60 m (5 ft 3 in)
- Turned pro: 2004
- Retired: 2019
- Plays: Right-handed (two-handed backhand)
- Coach: Matej Lipták
- Prize money: $13,725,520: 44th in all-time rankings

Singles
- Career record: 450–299
- Career titles: 8
- Highest ranking: No. 4 (20 March 2017)

Grand Slam singles results
- Australian Open: F (2014)
- French Open: SF (2009)
- Wimbledon: QF (2011, 2016, 2018)
- US Open: QF (2010)

Other tournaments
- Tour Finals: W (2016)
- Olympic Games: 3R (2008)

Doubles
- Career record: 55–81
- Career titles: 1
- Highest ranking: No. 59 (13 August 2012)

Grand Slam doubles results
- Australian Open: 3R (2016)
- French Open: 2R (2010, 2014)
- Wimbledon: 3R (2010)
- US Open: QF (2008)

Team competitions
- Fed Cup: SF (2013), record 21–19
- Hopman Cup: W (2009)

Dominika Cibulková (Slovak pronunciation: [ˈdɔminika ˈtsibulkɔʋaː]; born 6 May 1989) is a Slovak former professional tennis player. She is the 2016 WTA Finals champion, becoming the fourth player (after Serena Williams in 2001, Maria Sharapova in 2004 and Petra Kvitová in 2011) to win the tournament on her debut. She won eight WTA Tour singles titles and two on the ITF Circuit.

Cibulková reached the quarterfinals or better of all four Grand Slam tournaments at least once. One of her most notable achievements was a final appearance at the 2014 Australian Open. Although she lost to Li Na, she was the first Slovak woman to reach the final of a Grand Slam tournament.

== Career ==
=== Early years ===
Early in her career, Cibulková predominantly competed on the ITF Women's Circuit, and managed to win two tournaments: the Amarante event in Portugal in 2005, and the Bratislava event in 2006.

=== 2007: Major debut ===
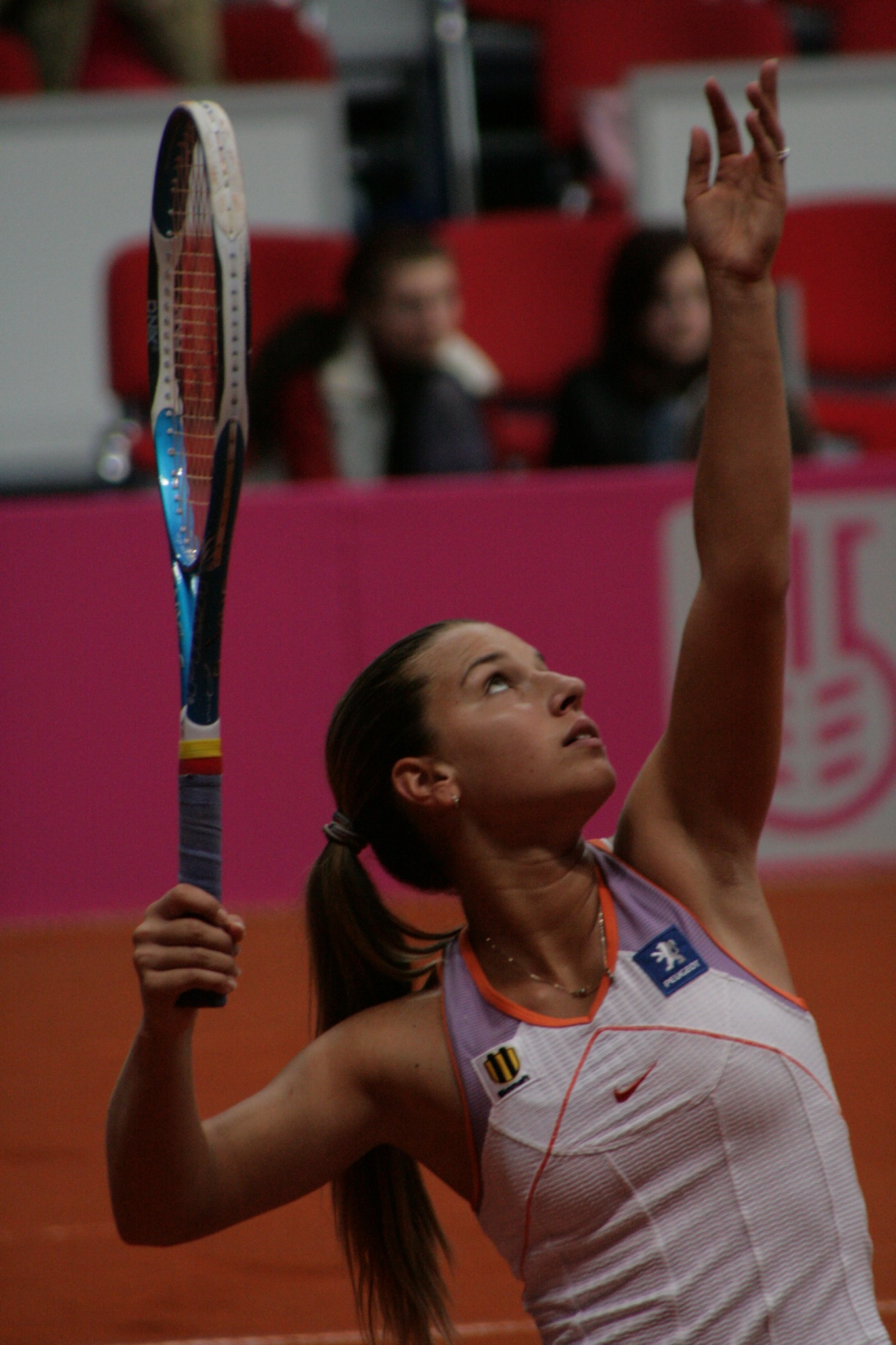
Cibulková during the 2007 season

She started the season with a win over Tara Iyer in the first round of the Bangalore Open, but lost to No. 4 seed Jelena Kostanić Tošić in the second round.

At the French Open, Cibulková qualified and made her Grand Slam main-draw debut, reaching the third round. In the second, she upset Martina Müller after beating Sun Tiantian but eventually lost to Svetlana Kuznetsova. She also reached the third round in Amelia Island, beating Anabel Medina Garrigues but losing to fellow Slovak Daniela Hantuchová, and the quarterfinals of the ECM Prague Open, beating Gisela Dulko before falling to Victoria Azarenka.

Her best finish of the year came in September, when she exited at the semifinal stage at the Guangzhou International Open in China where she lost to eventual champion Virginie Razzano.

=== 2008: First WTA Tour final ===
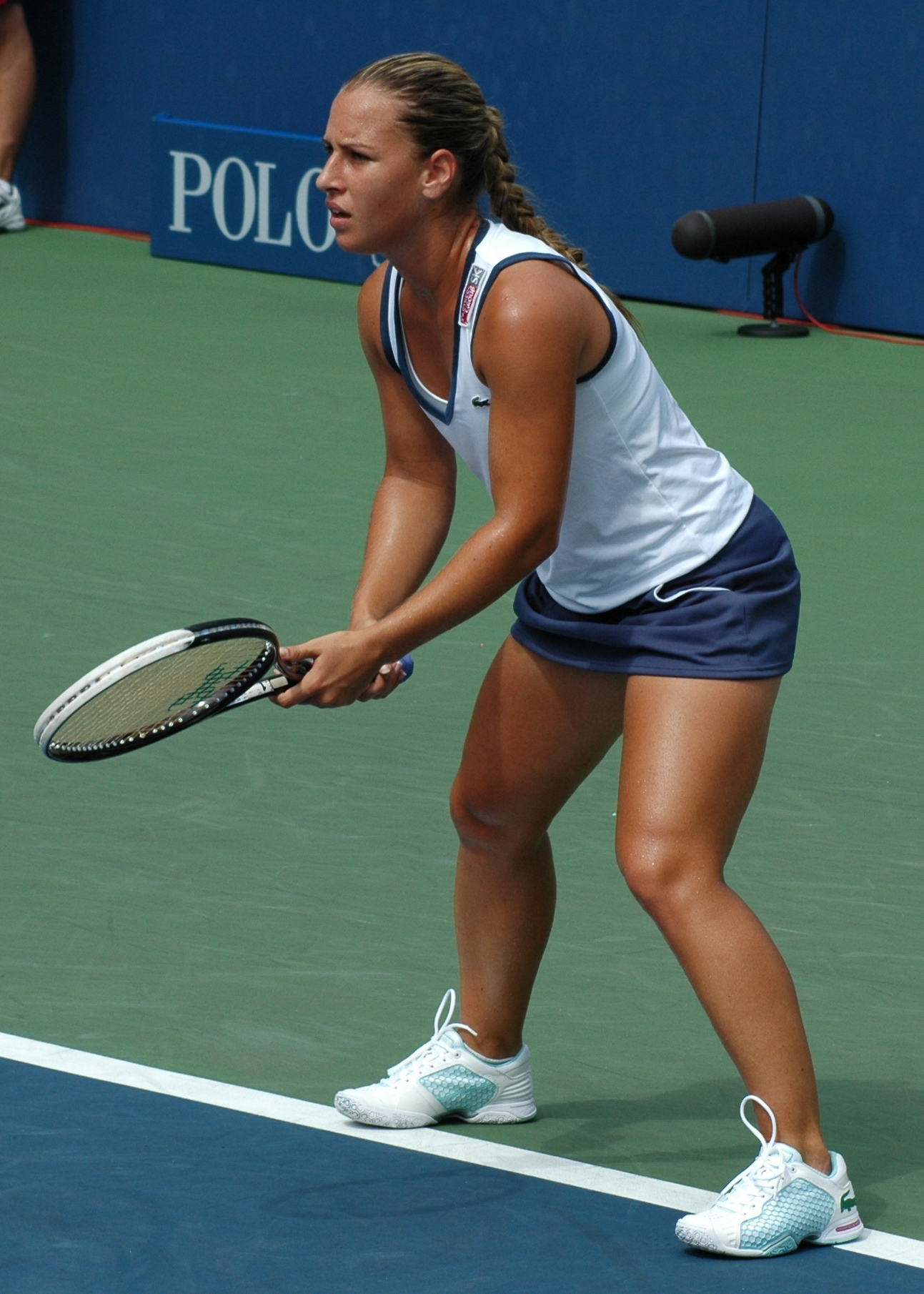
Cibulková at the 2008 US Open

At the Australian Open, Cibulková lost in the first round to Flavia Pennetta. Playing for Slovakia in the first round of Fed Cup against the Czech Republic in Brno, she split her two singles matches as her country lost the tie 2–3.

At the Qatar Ladies Open, Cibulková reached her first-ever Tier-I quarterfinal, defeating former world No. 1, Venus Williams, in the third round, before losing to Agnieszka Radwańska in the quarterfinals. In April, Cibulková reached the final of a WTA Tour event for the first time. At the Tier-II clay-court Amelia Island Championships, she lost the final to Maria Sharapova. Cibulková was seeded 30th in singles at Wimbledon but lost in the first round to unseeded wildcard player and eventual semifinalist, Zheng Jie of China. She reached the third round of the women's singles at the 2008 Olympics. At the Rogers Cup in Montreal, Cibulková defeated second-seeded Jelena Janković in the quarterfinals and Marion Bartoli in the semifinals, but lost the final to seventh-seeded Dinara Safina.

=== 2009: French Open semifinal ===
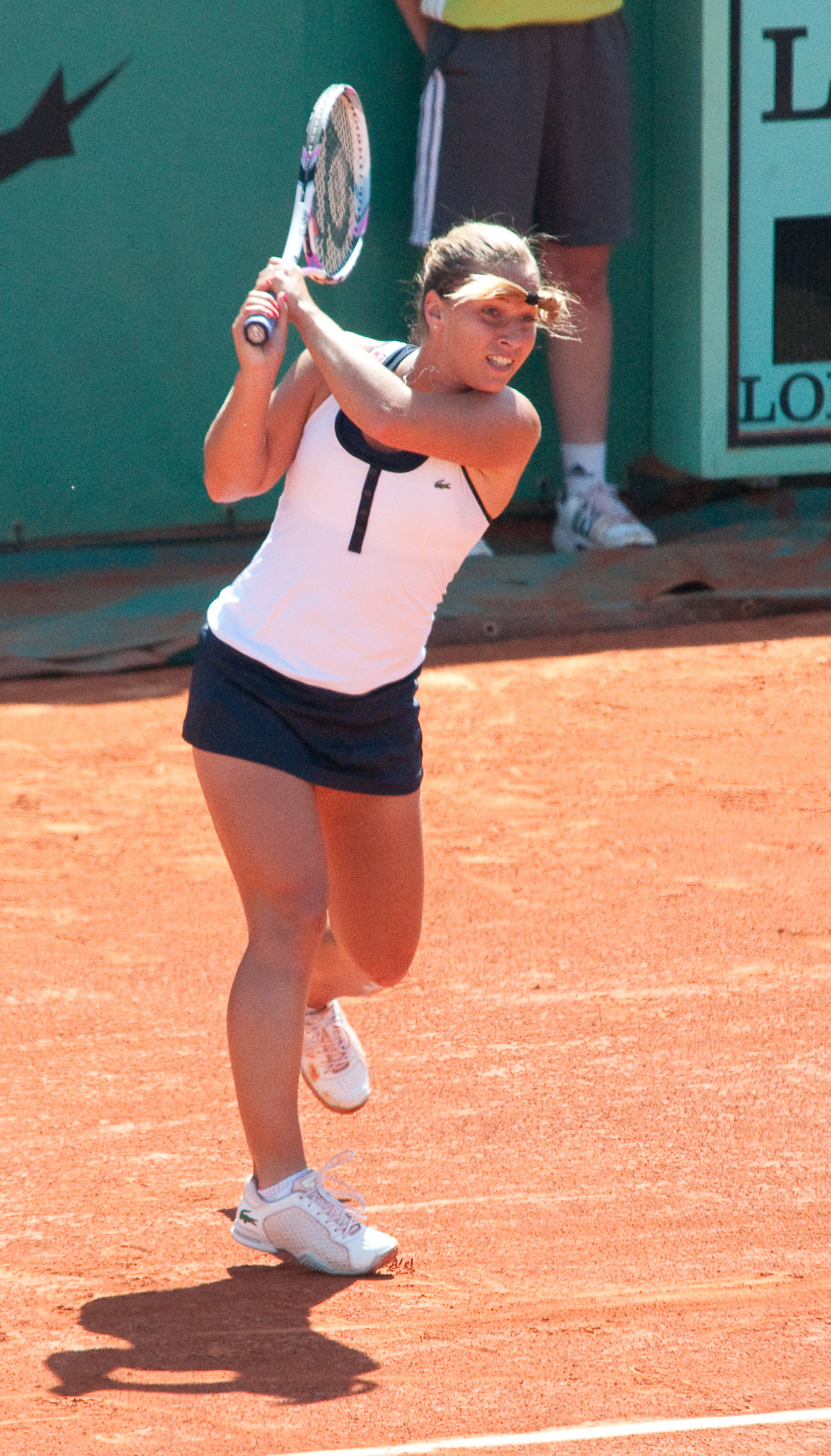
Cibulková at the 2009 French Open

At the Australian Open, Cibulková advanced to the fourth round and lost to Elena Dementieva. She began the clay-court season at the MPS Group Championships and Family Circle Cup, losing to Elena Vesnina and Elena Dementieva respectively.

At the French Open, she was seeded 20th and defeated Alona Bondarenko, Kirsten Flipkens, Gisela Dulko, and Ágnes Szávay to reach her first Grand Slam quarterfinal. She then defeated Maria Sharapova in straight sets, but lost to Dinara Safina in the semifinal. In this successful phase of her career, she worked with tennis coach Vladimír Pláteník and fitness coach Maroš Molnár from Slovakia. Seeded 14th at Wimbledon, she beat Julie Coin and Urszula Radwańska, but lost to Elena Vesnina in the third round. She then competed at the Swedish Open where she lost to Gisela Dulko in the quarterfinals. She withdrew from the US Open and several of the following hard-court tournaments due to a rib injury.

=== 2010: US Open quarterfinal ===
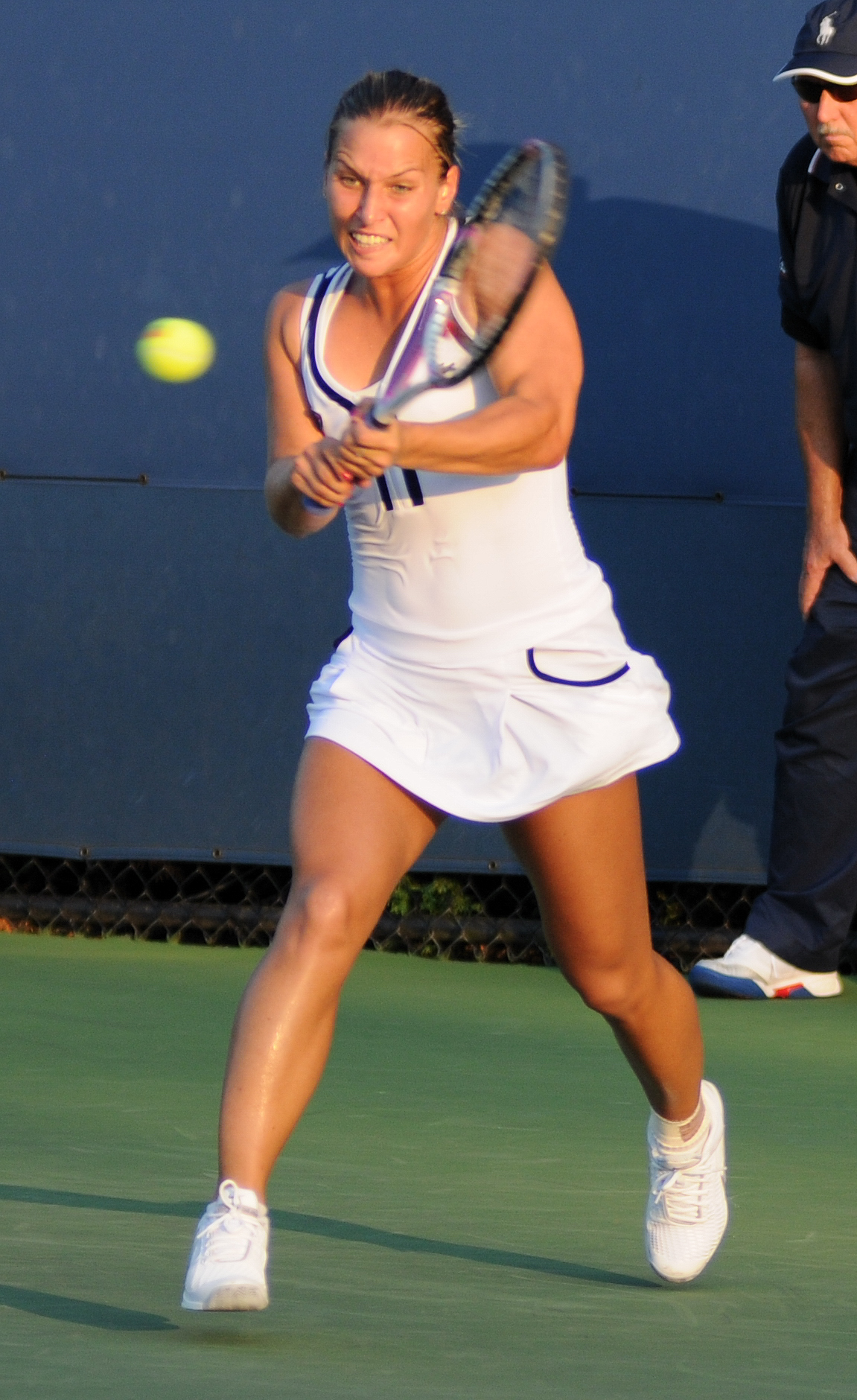
Cibulková at the 2010 US Open

Cibulková started 2010 by reaching the quarterfinals of the Auckland Open where she lost to top seed Flavia Pennetta. At the Australian Open, where she was seeded 23rd, Cibulková was upset by Vania King in the first round.

At the Monterrey Open, she was the fourth seed. Cibulková came from a set down to beat No. 5 seed Ágnes Szávay in the quarterfinals. She fell to No. 2 seed, Daniela Hantuchová, in three sets. At the Indian Wells Open she was upset by Sara Errani in the second round, after receiving a bye.

She then played at the Rosmalen Open, losing her quarterfinal match to Kirsten Flipkens. At Wimbledon, where she upset Lucie Šafářová and Ayumi Morita, she lost in the third round to world No. 1, Serena Williams. At the US Open, Cibulková advanced to her second career major quarterfinal, after defeating Stefanie Vögele, 2009 quarterfinalist Kateryna Bondarenko, Lourdes Domínguez Lino, and 11th seed Svetlana Kuznetsova. She lost to the top seed Caroline Wozniacki in the quarterfinals.

=== 2011: First title on WTA Tour ===
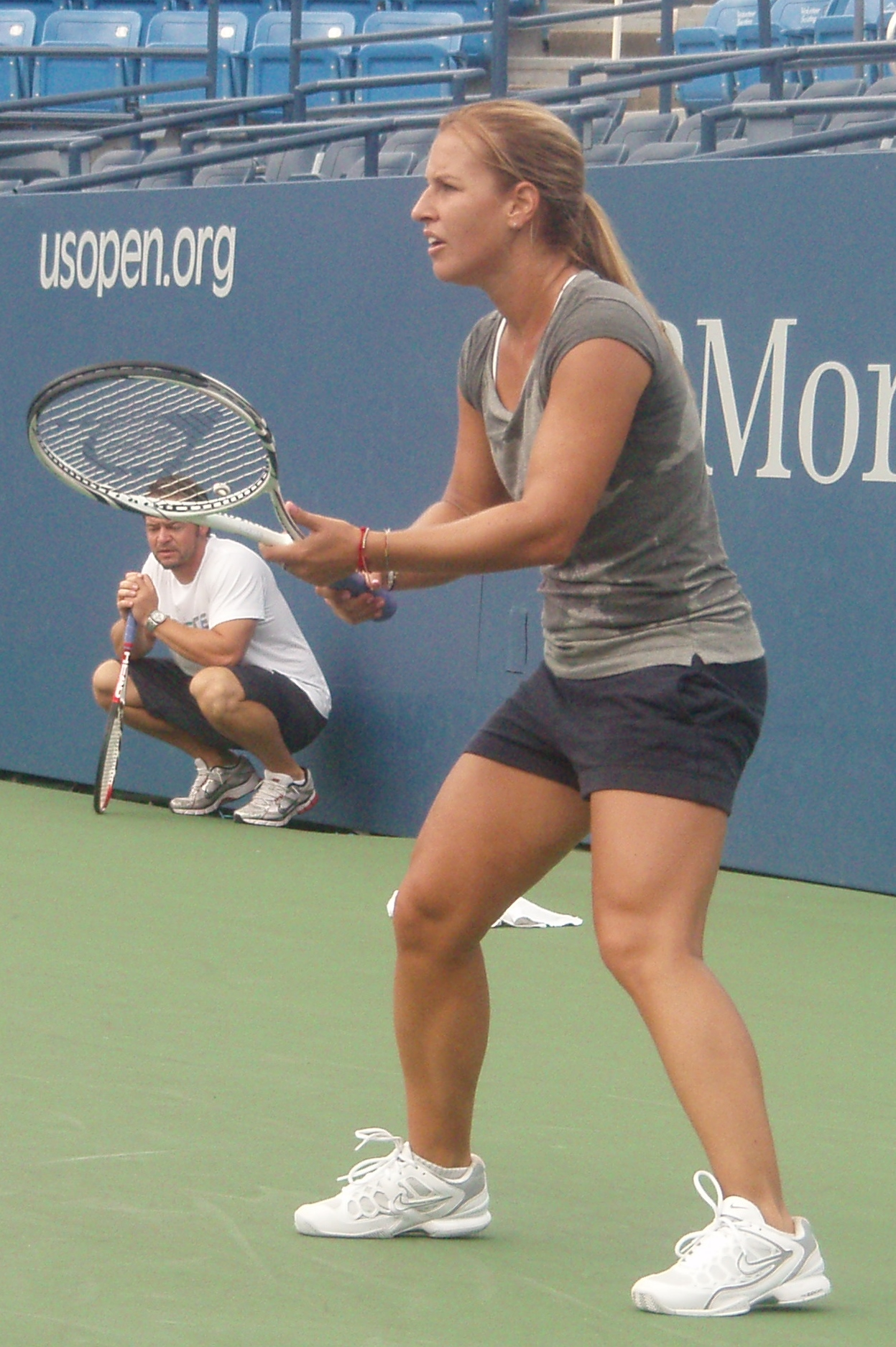
Cibulková at the 2011 US Open

Cibulková began the year at the Brisbane International where she reached quarterfinals defeating Sara Errani and Roberta Vinci. She lost her quarterfinal match to eventual champion Petra Kvitová, 0–6, 4–6. She then entered the Sydney International and defeated Maria Kirilenko in the first round, in two sets. In the second, she beat world No. 1, Caroline Wozniacki, in straight sets before she was defeated by Alisa Kleybanova in the quarterfinals. Seeded 29th at the Australian Open, Cibulková won her first two rounds against Angelique Kerber and Alberta Brianti. In the third round, she lost to top-seeded Caroline Wozniacki, in straight sets.

In the Fed Cup tie versus the Czech Republic, Cibulková played one rubber in which she was upset by Petra Kvitová. The Czech Republic ended up defeating Slovakia 3–2. Seeded eighth at the Open GdF Suez, Cibulková advanced to the quarterfinals beating qualifier Ana Vrljić and Melanie Oudin losing there to third seed Kaia Kanepi. At Dubai, Cibulková lost in the first round to Jarmila Groth. At the Qatar Open, she was defeated in the second round by second seed and eventual champion, Vera Zvonareva 6–1, 6–2. Seeded 25th at the Indian Wells Open, Cibulková got a first-round bye. She won her second- and third-round matches over wildcard Sania Mirza and third seed Vera Zvonareva but lost in round four to 23rd seed Yanina Wickmayer. Seeded 25th at the Miami Open, Cibulková again got a first-round bye. She was defeated in the third round by eighth seed and eventual champion Victoria Azarenka.

In the World Group play-offs tie against Serbia, she won her first rubber against Bojana Jovanovski in three sets. She faced Ana Ivanovic in her final rubber and won the first set 6–4; it was tied 3–3 in the second set when Ivanovic retired due to an abdominal muscle problem. Her two wins were not enough as Serbia defeated Slovakia 3–2.

Cibulková began her clay-court season at the Porsche Tennis Grand Prix where she lost in the first round to German wildcard Sabine Lisicki in two narrow sets.

At Wimbledon, Cibulková repeated the upset from Sydney by beating Wozniacki in three sets, losing in the quarterfinals to Maria Sharapova.

She won her first tour title at the Kremlin Cup, edging Kaia Kanepi in three sets. Her win represents the first time a player has captured their maiden title at the Kremlin Cup.

=== 2012 ===
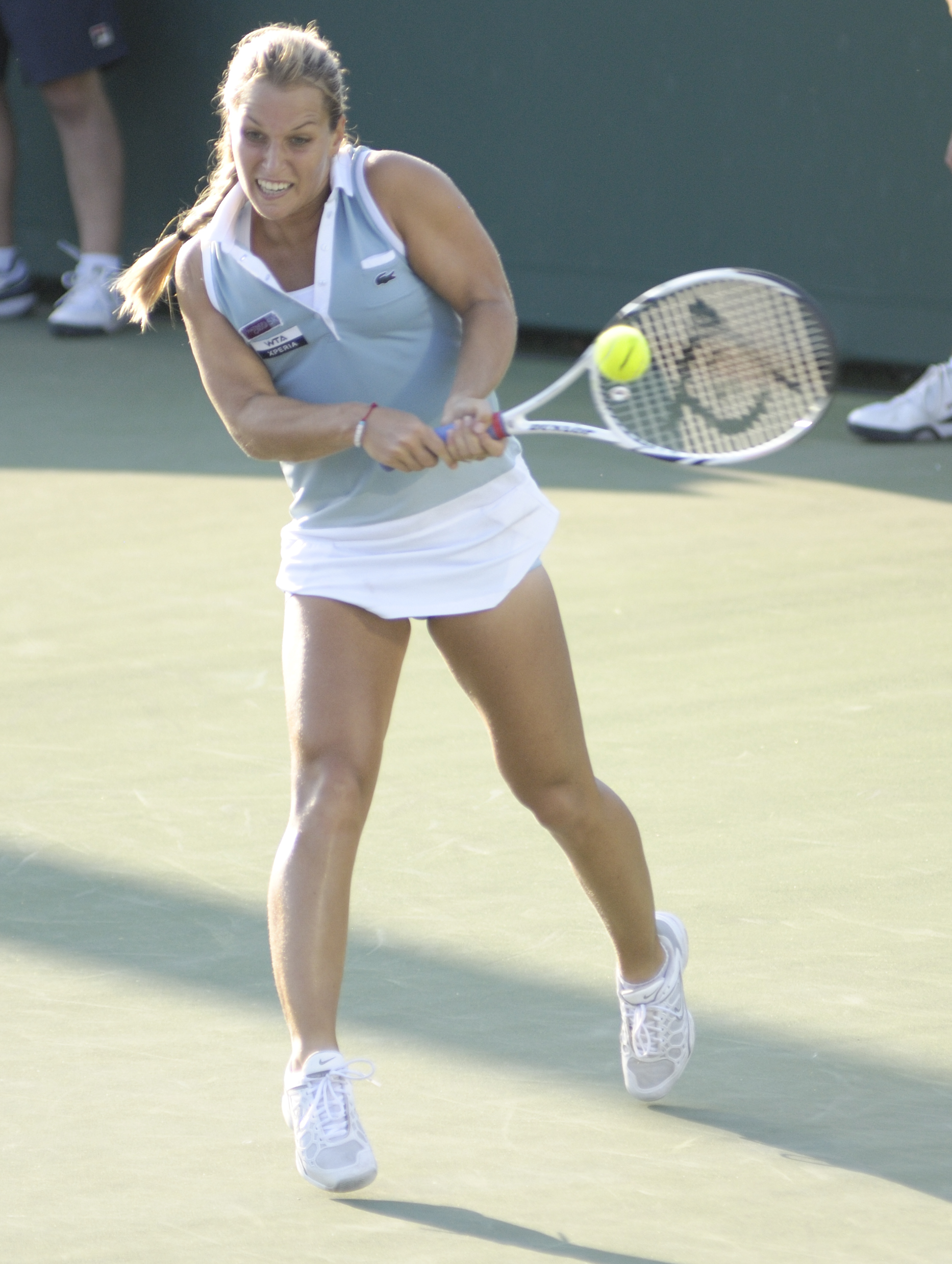
Cibulková at the 2012 Miami Open

Seeded 17th in the Australian Open, Cibulková lost her second-round match to Gréta Arn. At the Miami Open, she came close to beating then-world No. 1, Victoria Azarenka, leading her by a set and 5–2 before Azarenka prevailed. Cibulková then reached the finals of the Barcelona Open, losing to Sara Errani. At the French Open, she avenged her Miami loss to Azarenka, beating the world No. 1 in straight sets in the fourth round. She subsequently reached the quarterfinals for the second time, but lost to Samantha Stosur.

Her only Wimbledon warm up tournament was the Rosmalen Championships. She reached the quarterfinals before losing to eventual champion Nadia Petrova. She lost in the first round at Wimbledon to Klára Zakopalová. At the 2012 Summer Olympics, she competed in the women's singles and the women's doubles with Daniela Hantuchova, but lost in the first round of each.

She defeated Marion Bartoli in straight sets to win the Carlsbad Open in California, picking up the second title of her career. She reached the third round of the US Open, losing to Roberta Vinci.

=== 2013 ===
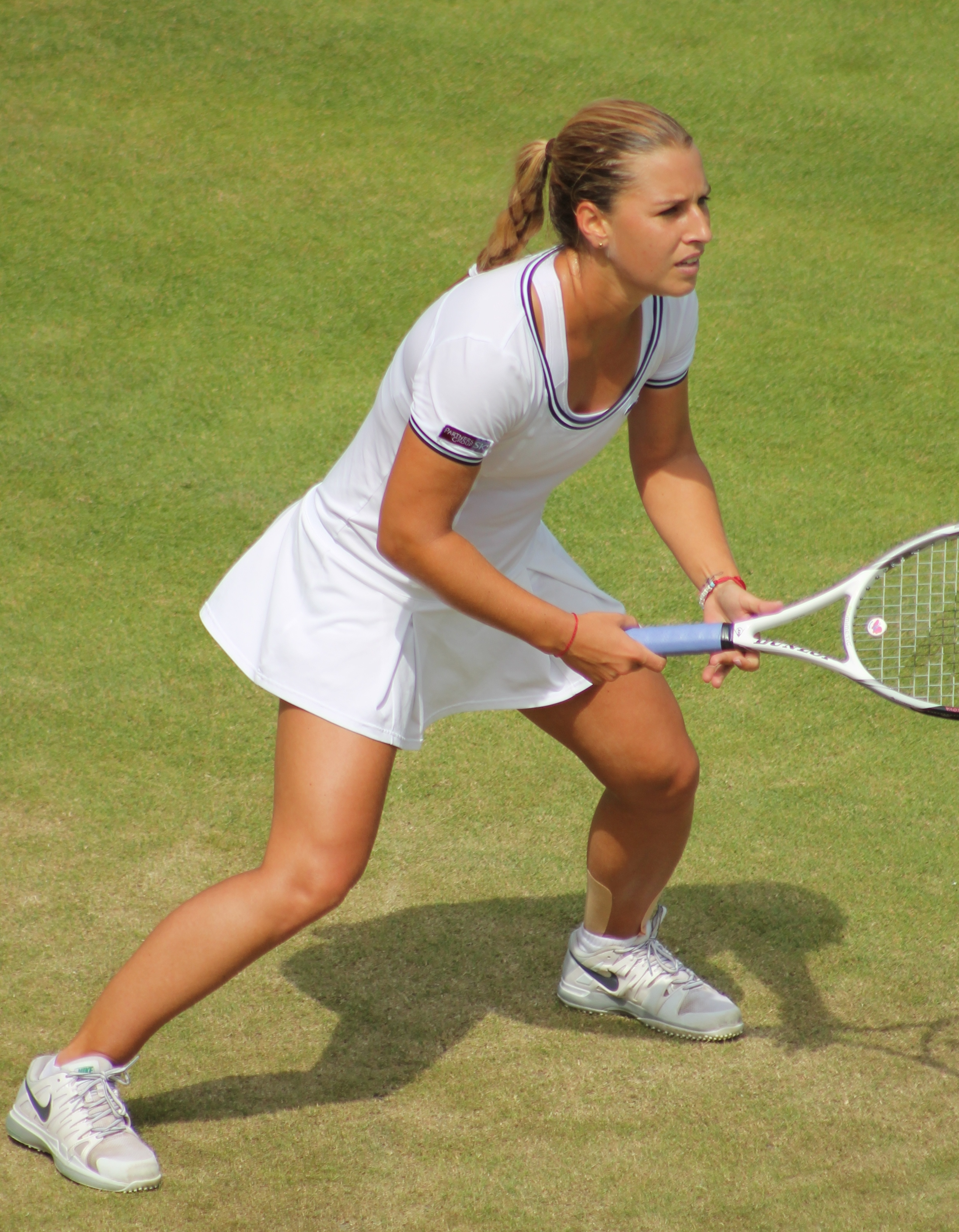
Cibulková at the 2013 Wimbledon Championships

Cibulková began her 2013 season at the Brisbane International. She lost in the first round to Sloane Stephens. After Brisbane, Cibulková competed at the Sydney International. She reached the final after wins over fifth seed Petra Kvitová, Ekaterina Makarova, third seed Sara Errani, and second seed Angelique Kerber. In the championship match, she was defeated by top seed Agnieszka Radwańska; she failed to win a single game during the match. Seeded 15th at the Australian Open, Cibulková lost in the second round to qualifier Valeria Savinykh.

Seeded fourth at the Paris Indoors, Cibulková was defeated in the second round by lucky loser Kiki Bertens. During the Fed Cup tie versus Serbia, Cibulková retired from her match against Vesna Dolonc due to a calf injury. Slovakia was still able to win the tie 3–2. At the Dubai Championships, Cibulková lost in the first round to Nadia Petrova. Seeded twelfth at the Indian Wells Open, Cibulková was defeated in the third round by 19th seed Klára Zakopalová. Seeded 13th at the Miami Open, Cibulková advanced to the fourth round where she lost to top seed and eventual champion, Serena Williams. Playing in the semifinal Fed Cup tie versus Russia, Cibulková won her first match over Anastasia Pavlyuchenkova but lost her second match to Maria Kirilenko. Russia defeated Slovakia 3–2 to advance to the Fed Cup Final.

Cibulková started her clay-court season at the Portugal Open. Seeded second, she was defeated in the first round by Urszula Radwańska. Seeded 15th at the Madrid Open, Cibulková lost in the second round to Sabine Lisicki. Seeded 14th at the Italian Open, Cibulková was defeated in the third round by top seed and eventual champion, Serena Williams. Seeded third at the Brussels Open, Cibulková lost in the first round to eventual champion Kaia Kanepi. Seeded 16th at the French Open, Cibulková was defeated in the second round by Marina Erakovic.

Beginning her grass-court season as the second seed at the Rosmalen Championships, Cibulková reached the quarterfinal where she lost to qualifier Garbiñe Muguruza. Seeded 18th at Wimbledon, Cibulková was defeated in the third round by 11th seed Roberta Vinci.

Cibulková kicked off her US Open Series at Stanford. Seeded third, she won her third WTA Tour singles title beating top seed Agnieszka Radwańska in the final. Despite being the defending champion at the Southern California Open, Cibulková lost in the first round to seventh seed Ana Ivanovic. At the Canadian Open, Cibulková made it to the quarterfinal where she was defeated by fourth seed Li Na. In Ohio at the Cincinnati Open, Cibulková fell in the first round to qualifier Polona Hercog. Seeded eighth at the New Haven Open at Yale, Cibulková lost in the first round to Klára Zakopalová. Seeded 17th at the US Open, Cibulková was defeated in the first round by Elina Svitolina.

Seeded sixteenth in Tokyo at the Pan Pacific Open, Cibulková lost in the third round to second seed Agnieszka Radwańska. At the China Open, Cibulková was defeated in the first round by Madison Keys. Seeded seventh at the Generali Ladies Linz, Cibulková lost in her quarterfinal match to third seed, two-time champion, and eventual finalist, Ana Ivanovic. Cibulková played her final tournament of the season at the Kremlin Cup. Seeded ninth, she was defeated in the first round by qualifier Vesna Dolonc.

Cibulková ended the year ranked 23.

=== 2014: First major final and inconsistencies ===
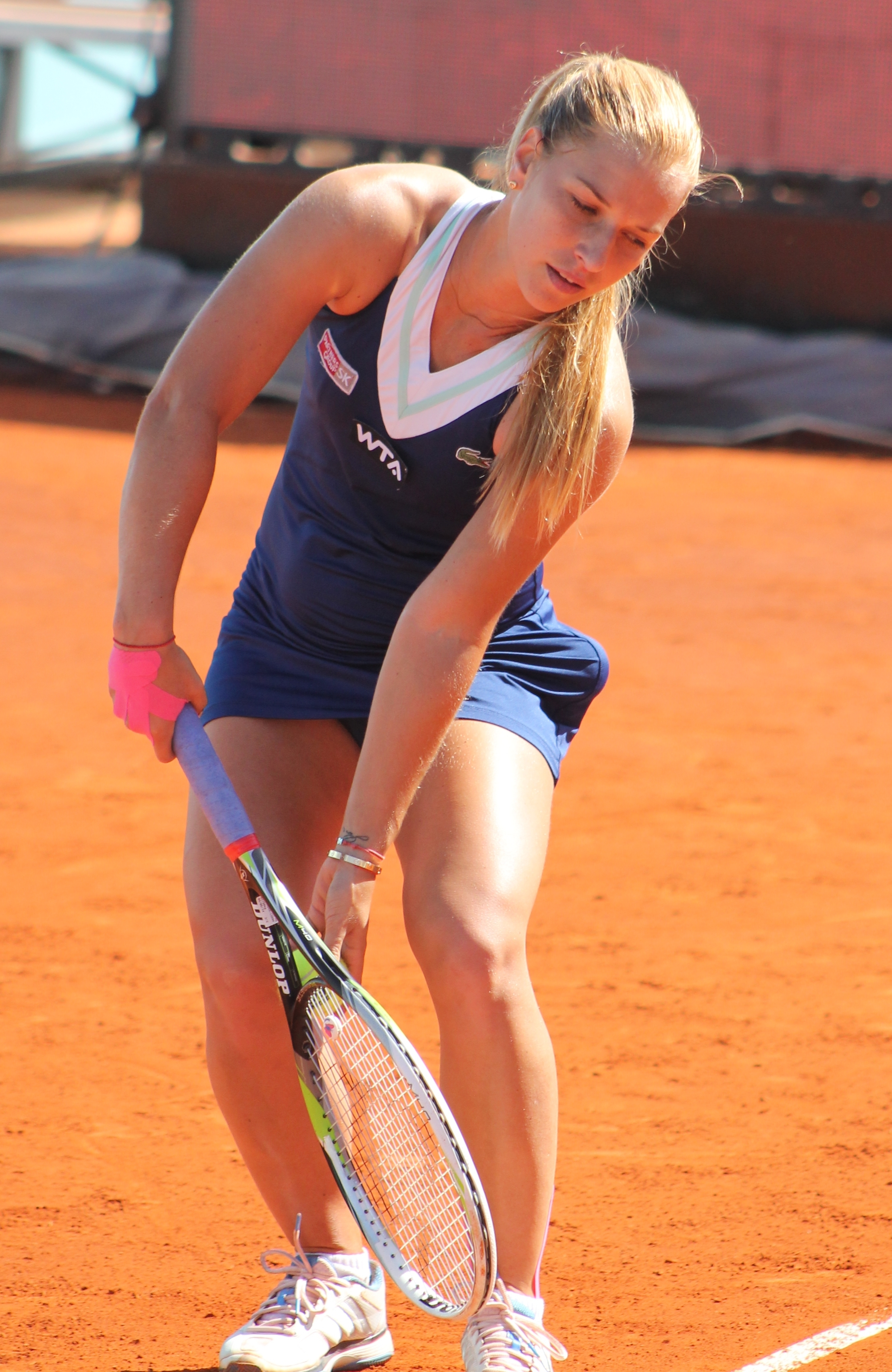
Cibulková at the 2014 Madrid Open

Cibulková began the season at the Brisbane International, where she dropped a quarterfinal match to Serena Williams. At the Australian Open, she won her first three matches in straight sets, setting up her first hardcourt meeting with Maria Sharapova, whom she defeated in three sets. She then defeated Simona Halep to reach her first Grand Slam semifinal since the 2009 French Open. Following her semifinal upset over Radwańska, Cibulková was featured on the January 24 cover of The Washington Post. She faced Li Na in her first major final, losing the first set in a tie-break and the second set without winning a game.

In February, she played for Slovakia in a Fed Cup match against Germany. She lost both her matches, against Andrea Petkovic and Angelique Kerber. Slovakia was eliminated from the competition.

Cibulková won the Mexican Open in Acapulco with a victory over Christina McHale. She reached the quarterfinals of the Indian Wells Open, losing to Li Na. At the Miami Open, she defeated Agnieszka Radwańska in a three-set quarterfinal. With this victory, Cibulková entered the WTA top 10 for the first time in her career. She exited the tournament in the semifinals, losing to Li Na in three sets. She then reached the final of the Malaysian Open, which she lost to Donna Vekić. After that final, Cibulková's struggled with form were noticeable, as she won just nine matches and lost fifteen till the end of season. At Grand Slam tournaments, she reached the third round of the French Open and Wimbledon. She exited in the first round of the US Open, losing to CiCi Bellis in three sets.

=== 2015: Achilles surgery ===
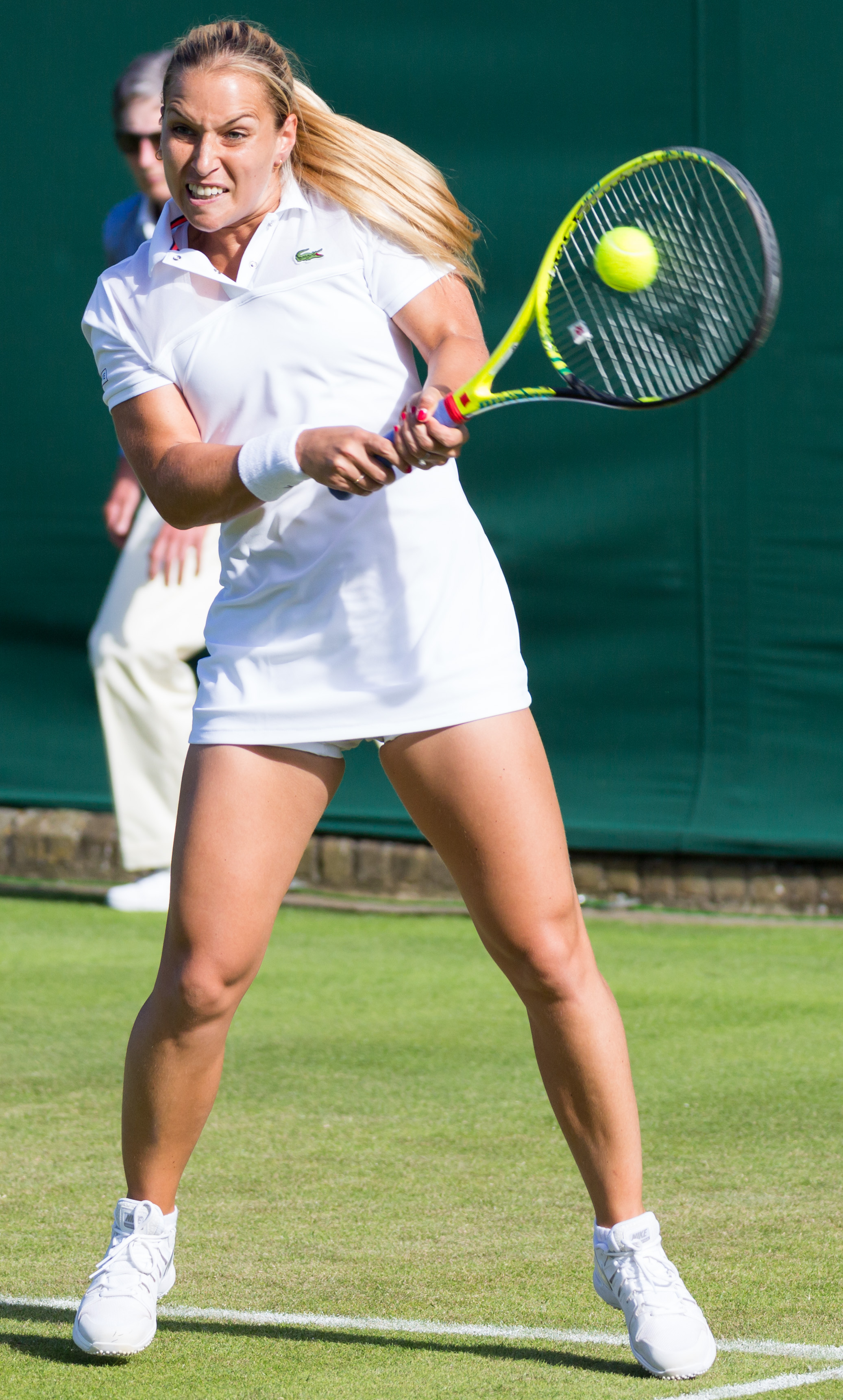
Cibulková at the 2015 Wimbledon Championships

Seeded fourth at the Brisbane International, Cibulková lost in the first round to Madison Keys. Seeded seventh at Sydney, she was defeated in the second round by Jarmila Gajdošová. Seeded 11th at the Australian Open, Cibulková reached the quarterfinals by beating Kirsten Flipkens, Tsvetana Pironkova, Alizé Cornet, and Victoria Azarenka. In her quarterfinal match, she lost to top seed and eventual champion Serena Williams.

Seeded sixth at Antwerpen, she reached the quarterfinals where she was defeated by eventual champion Andrea Petkovic. During that match, she struggled with a left Achilles tendon injury. Cibulková underwent surgery for her left Achilles tendon in February and missed the North American hardcourt and all of the clay-court season.

Cibulková returned for the grass-court season at the Eastbourne International. She lost in the third round to Tsvetana Pironkova. At the Wimbledon Championships, she fell in the first round to Daniela Hantuchová.

At the İstanbul Cup, Cibulková lost in the first round to fifth seed Camila Giorgi. Seeded third at the Baku Cup, she was defeated in the first round by eventual champion Margarita Gasparyan.

At the Canadian Open, she lost in the second round to Alizé Cornet. In Cincinnati at the Western & Southern Open, Cibulková was defeated in the first round by Flavia Pennetta. At the Connecticut Open, she lost in her quarterfinal match to fourth seed and eventual finalist, Lucie Šafářová. In New York at the US Open, Cibulková stunned seventh seed and former world No. 1, Ana Ivanovic, in the first round. She was defeated in the third round by 25th seed Eugenie Bouchard.

In Tokyo at the Pan Pacific Open, Cibulková reached the semifinal where she lost to seventh seed and eventual champion, Agnieszka Radwańska. At the Wuhan Open, Cibulková was defeated in the first round by Madison Brengle. Playing in Beijing at the China Open, Cibulková lost in the second round to tenth seed Angelique Kerber. Cibulková competed in her final tournament of the season at the Kremlin Cup. She was defeated in the second round by fifth seed Carla Suárez Navarro.

Cibulková ended the year ranked 38.

=== 2016: Resurgence, WTA Finals champion ===
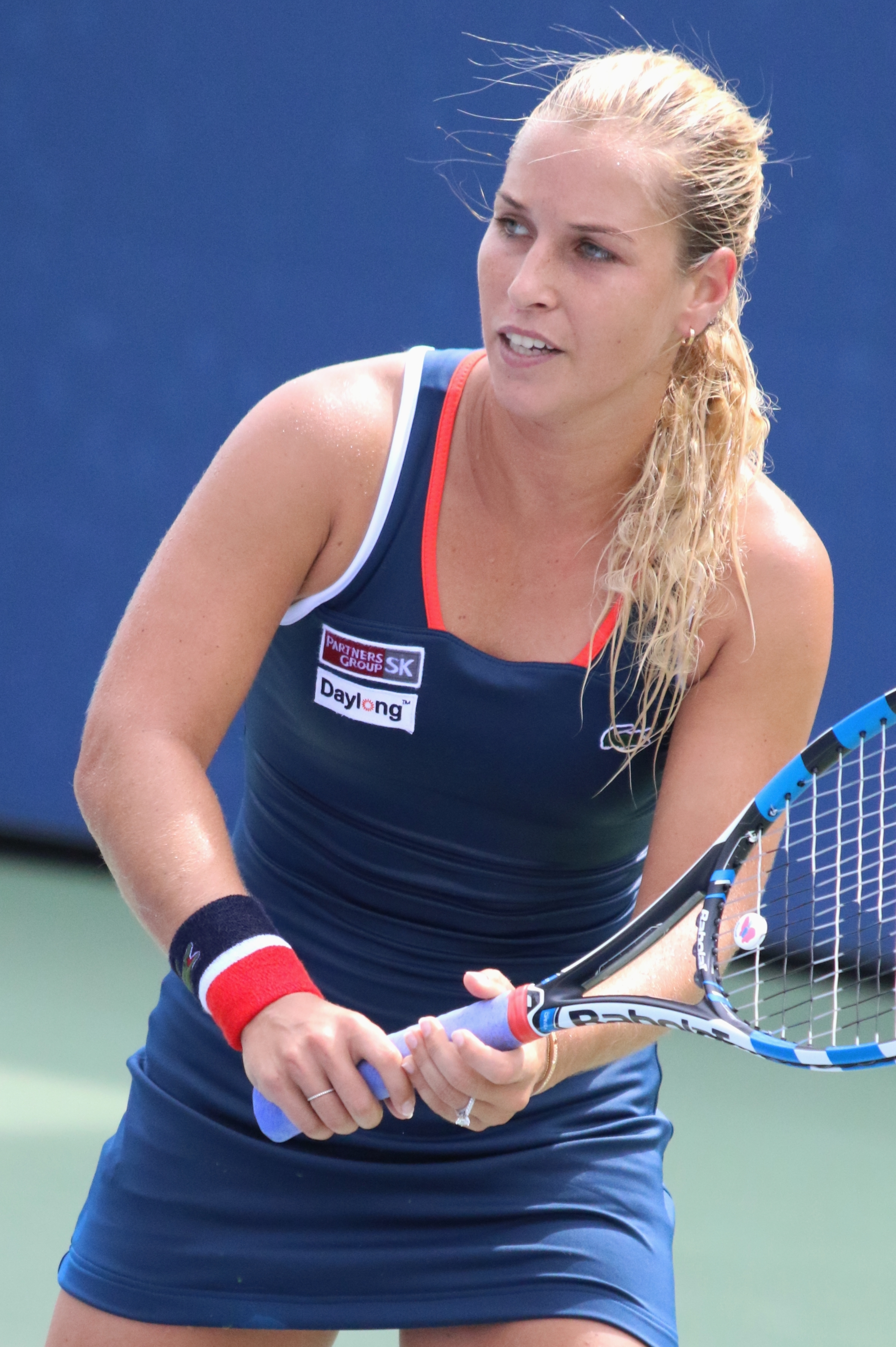
Cibulková at the 2016 US Open

Cibulková started her 2016 year at the Brisbane International. In the first round, she beat Yanina Wickmayer in three sets followed by a second-round loss to eight seed Roberta Vinci in straight sets. Next, she played at the Hobart International where she was the third seed. She reached the semifinals by beating Johanna Konta, Australian wildcard Kimberly Birrell and qualifier Kiki Bertens. In the semifinals, Cibulková lost to Eugenie Bouchard in a three-set match. At the Australian Open, she lost in the first round to 28th seed Kristina Mladenovic in two sets, thus failing to defend her quarterfinal points from 2015.

In February, she played one match for Slovakia in the Fed Cup tie against Australia. She won her match against Kimberly Birrell, but Slovakia lost to Australia 2–3.

Cibulková reached the final in Acapulco, where she lost to the second seed Sloane Stephens. In Indian Wells, she lost to Agnieszka Radwańska in the second round, despite leading 5–3 and having a match point in the third set. She won the Katowice Open by defeating Camila Giorgi in the final. This was her first WTA title of the season. She then reached the final of the Madrid Open, but was runner-up to Simona Halep.

At the rain-drenched French Open that year, in muddy and heavy conditions, she reached the third round before falling to Carla Suarez Navarro. Cibulková won her first grass-court title at the Eastbourne International, defeating Karolína Plíšková in the final. She then reached the quarterfinals of the Wimbledon Championships where she was defeated by Elena Vesnina.

Following early exits in the US Open and the Pan Pacific Open, she reached the final in Wuhan, opposite Petra Kvitová, but finished as runner-up. Nevertheless, this strong performance in the tournament, including having to play two matches on the same day at one point, saw her reach a career high of No. 8 in the rankings.

Cibulková won the Ladies Linz with a straight-sets victory over Viktorija Golubic, earning her third WTA Tour title of the year and seventh overall. It also ensured that she qualified for the WTA Finals in Singapore for the first time in her career. After dropping a three-set match to Angelique Kerber, and a second match to Madison Keys, Cibulková defeated Simona Halep in straight sets to advance to the semifinals. She then defeated Svetlana Kuznetsova in three sets, advancing to the championship round. She beat world No. 1, Angelique Kerber, in straight sets to claim the WTA Finals title in her first appearance at the tournament. She ended the year with four titles and a career-high ranking of world No. 5.

=== 2017: First doubles title, out of top 20 ===
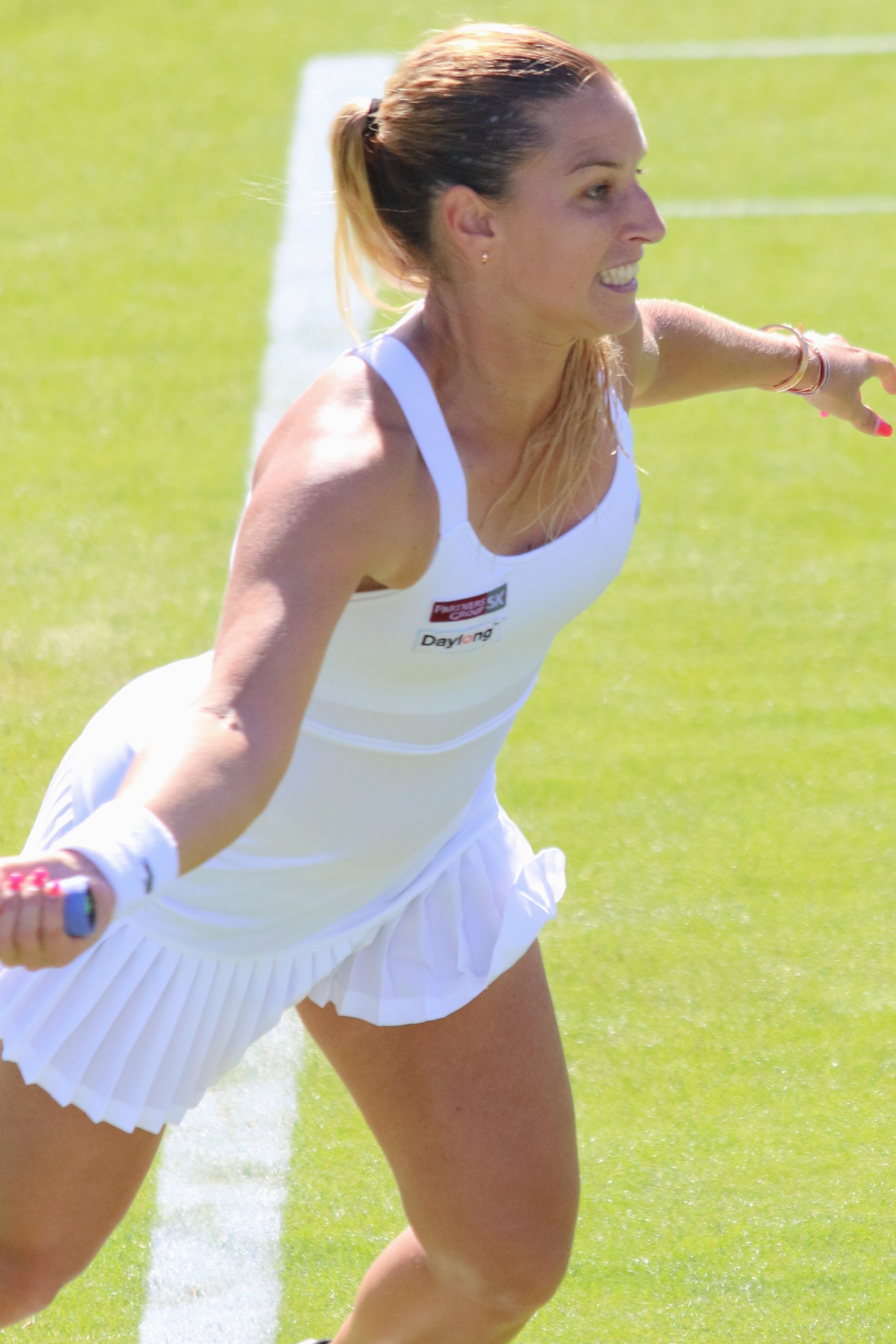
Cibulková at the 2017 Eastbourne International

Cibulková started her 2017 season at the Brisbane International. Seeded second, she lost in her quarterfinal match to eventual finalist Alizé Cornet. Seeded third at the Sydney International, Cibulková was defeated in the second round by Eugenie Bouchard. Seeded sixth at the Australian Open, Cibulková lost in the third round to 30th seed Ekaterina Makarova.

Seeded second at the St. Petersburg Ladies' Trophy, Cibulková reached the semifinal where she was defeated by Yulia Putintseva. Seeded third at the Qatar Open, Cibulková lost in her semifinal match to second seed and eventual champion Karolína Plíšková. Seeded third in Dubai at the Dubai Championships, Cibulková was defeated in the second round by Ekaterina Makarova. Seeded fifth at the Indian Wells Open, Cibulková advanced to the fourth round where she lost to nineteenth seed Anastasia Pavlyuchenkova. Nevertheless, this result saw her rise to a new career-high of No. 4 in the WTA rankings. Seeded fourth at the Miami Open, Cibulková reached the fourth round where she was defeated by Lucie Šafářová.

Cibulková was due to play in Stuttgart at the Porsche Grand Prix but withdrew at the last minute due to a wrist injury she sustained in practice. Seeded fourth and last year finalist at the Madrid Open, Cibulková defeated Jelena Janković in the first round but lost in the second round to qualifier Océane Dodin. Seeded fourth in Rome at the Italian Open, Cibulková was defeated in the second round by Ekaterina Makarova. This was Cibulková's third loss to Makarova this season. Seeded sixth at the French Open, Cibulková suffered a second-round upset at the hands of lucky loser Ons Jabeur.

As the top seed at the Ricoh Open, her first grass-court tournament of the season, Cibulková suffered a shocking first-round upset at the hands of German qualifier Antonia Lottner. However, she managed to win the doubles title alongside Kirsten Flipkens. This was her first WTA title in doubles, although this was already her third doubles final at this tournament. Seeded third at the Birmingham Classic, Cibulková lost in the first round to Lucie Šafářová. Seeded fourth and the defending champion at the Eastbourne International, Cibulková was defeated in the second round by British wildcard Heather Watson. Seeded eighth at the Wimbledon Championships, Cibulková beat Andrea Petkovic in a two-hour-and-43-minute-long first round match. She then defeated Jennifer Brady in the second round; she lost in her third-round match to 27th seed Ana Konjuh.

Seeded 11th at the Rogers Cup, Cibulková was defeated in the second round by Lucie Šafářová. Seeded 11th in Ohio at the Western & Southern Open, Cibulková lost in the third round to seventh seed Johanna Konta. Seeded second at the Connecticut Open, Cibulková advanced to her first final of the year where she was defeated by Daria Gavrilova. Seeded eleventh at the final Grand Slam tournament of the year, the US Open, Cibulková lost in the second round to eventual champion Sloane Stephens.

Seeded fifth in Tokyo at the Pan Pacific Open, Cibulková retired during the third set of her quarterfinal match against third seed and defending champion Caroline Wozniacki due to a right thigh injury. Cibulková returned from injury at the Wuhan Open. Seeded seventh, she was defeated in the third round by eventual champion Caroline Garcia. Seeded eighth at the China Open, Cibulková lost in the first round to Elise Mertens. Cibulková withdrew from the Upper Austria Ladies Linz, the tournament she won last year, due to injury. She also missed the Kremlin Cup.

Cibulková ended the year ranked 26.

=== 2018: Continued struggles ===
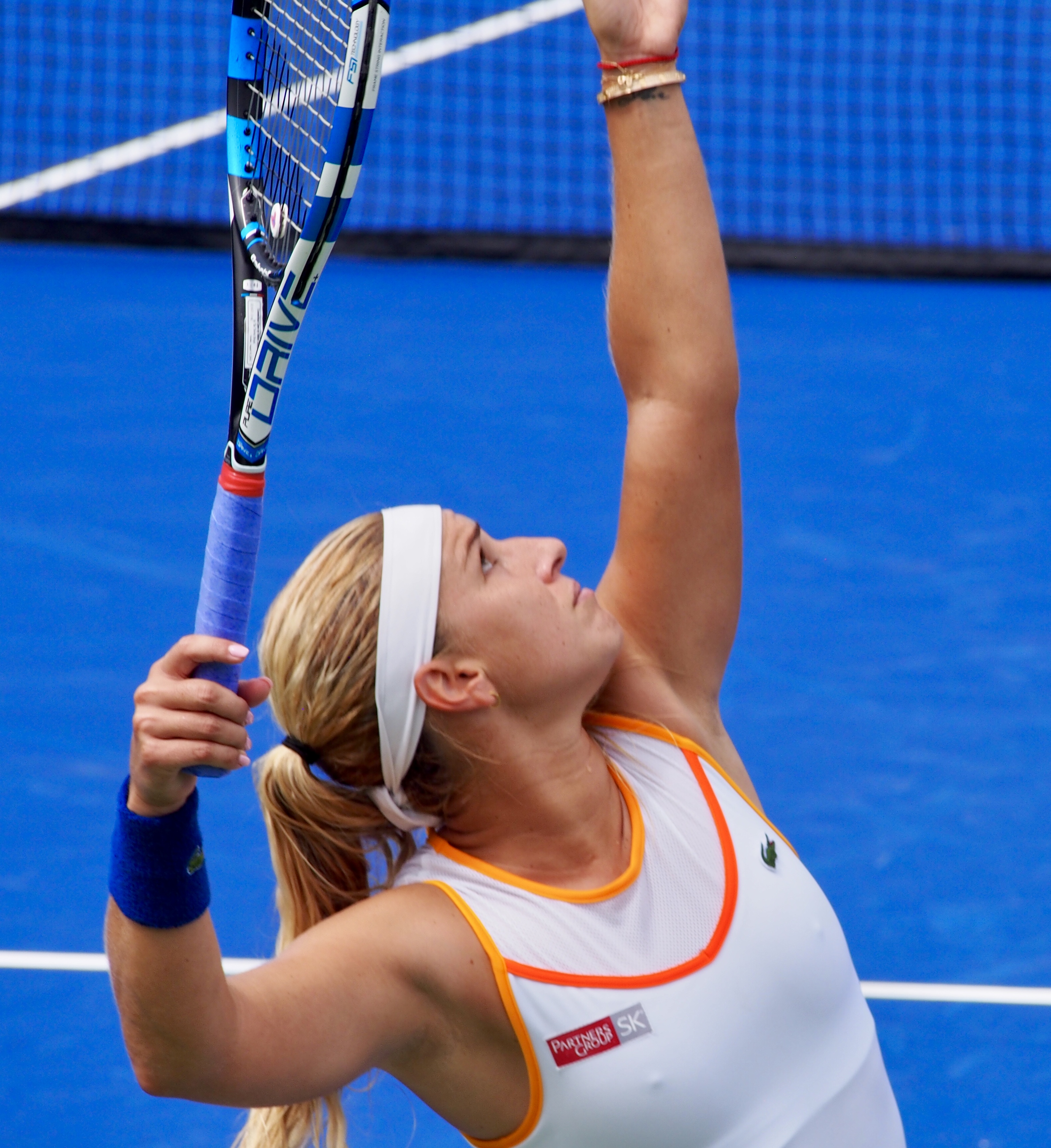
Cibulková at the 2018 Connecticut Open

Cibulková started her 2018 season at the Sydney International. She reached the quarterfinal where she lost to eventual champion Angelique Kerber. Seeded 24th at the Australian Open, Cibulková was defeated in the first round by Kaia Kanepi.

At the St. Petersburg Ladies' Trophy, Cibulková lost in the second round to fourth seed, defending champion, and eventual finalist Kristina Mladenovic. At the Qatar Open, Cibulková defeated Anastasia Pavlyuchenkova in the first round before losing to seventh seed Caroline Garcia in the second round. As the top seed at the Hungarian Ladies Open, Cibulková reached the final where she was defeated by Alison Van Uytvanck. Seeded 30th at the Indian Wells Open, Cibulková suffered a second-round upset at the hands of American wildcard Caroline Dolehide. Cibulková withdrew from the Miami Open due to illness.

Seeded second at the Morocco Open, Cibulková lost in the first round to Polona Hercog. At the Madrid Open, Cibulková was defeated in the first round by seventh seed Caroline Garcia. In Rome at the Italian Open, Cibulková lost in the second round to three-time champion Maria Sharapova. Seeded fifth at the Internationaux de Strasbourg, Cibulková reached the final where she was defeated by third seed Anastasia Pavlyuchenkova. This championship match lasted for three hours and thirty-five minutes; she had two match points but failed to convert. At the French Open, Cibulková lost in the first round to 11th seed Julia Görges.

Cibulková began her grass-court season at the Birmingham Classic. She was defeated in the first round by Daria Gavrilova. In Eastbourne at the Eastbourne International, Cibulková lost in the second round to fourth seed Angelique Kerber. At the Wimbledon Championships, Cibulková reached the quarterfinal after wins over Alizé Cornet, twenty-second seed Johanna Konta, fifteenth seed Elise Mertens, and Hsieh Su-wei. She was defeated in her quarterfinal match by 12th seed Jeļena Ostapenko.

Cibulková withdrew from the Canadian Open and the Western & Southern Open due to illness. Cibulková returned to action at the Connecticut Open where she had reached the final the year before. She lost in the first round to fifth seed Julia Görges.

In December she opened her own tennis academy, Love4Tennis, in Bratislava and took part in a film about Li Na, to whom she lost in the final of the Australian Open in 2014.

=== 2019: End of career ===
Cibulková started her 2019 season in Sydney with a first-round loss to Samantha Stosur. Seeded 26th at the Australian Open, Cibulková was defeated in the first round by Zhang Shuai.

At the Dubai Championships, Cibulková defeated qualifier Lara Arruabarrena in the first round, before falling in the second round to fourth seed Karolína Plíšková. Seeded thirty-second at the Indian Wells Open, Cibulková received a first-round bye; she lost in the second round to eventual champion Bianca Andreescu. At the Miami Open, Cibulková was defeated in the first round by Victoria Azarenka. During the Fed Cup tie versus Brazil, Cibulková won both of her rubbers beating Carolina Alves and Beatriz Haddad Maia. Slovakia won the tie 3–1.

Beginning her clay-court season at the Porsche Tennis Grand Prix, Cibulková lost in the first round to qualifier Greet Minnen. In Madrid at the Madrid Open, Cibulková was defeated in the first round by Naomi Osaka. At the Italian Open, Cibulková lost in the second round to top seed Naomi Osaka. In Paris at the French Open, Cibulková was defeated in the first round by 11th seed Aryna Sabalenka.

She did not play another singles match, and by the end of the season, she had sunk to No. 315 on the WTA rankings. Cibulková retired from professional tennis at the end of the season. Coincidentally, her final match of the year was at the French Open in doubles, partnered with Lucie Šafářová. The pair lost in the first round to Sofia Kenin/Andrea Petkovic and Šafářová retired after this tournament, meaning that both retired players' last match was with each other.

== Playing style ==
In 2014, Steve Tignor of Tennis.com called Cibulková "a threat to everyone". In describing her style, he later suggested that "any player, from top pros to rank amateurs, can learn a thing or two from how Cibulková approaches the game," citing aggression, enthusiasm, and a quick pace between points.

Self-described as a player with "a lot of energy", Cibulková employed an aggressive style that was largely founded on speed and power. She was known for her remarkable racquet-head speed, which enabled her to produce deep groundstrokes with her forehand and powerful shots with her backhand. She was also known for approaching the net and finishing points with swing volleys. Her aggressive shots have been noted for their ability to force errors or produce winners during extended rallies.

When a point ended, Cibulková "refocused right away," using the pace to pressure opponents or avoid negativity. She typically employed a high ball toss and a hard serve.

On defense, she often attacked second serves with quick forehands, and hit prompt returns while taking the ball on the rise. Occasionally, she did break a prolonged rally by mixing in a drop shot. Her lower-body strength created quickness around the court, enabling her to reach and return shots.

== Career statistics ==
=== Grand Slam tournament finals ===
==== Singles: 1 (runner-up) ====
Result	Year	Championship	Surface	Opponent	Score
Loss	2014	Australian Open	Hard	(China) Li Na	6–7^{(3–7)}, 0–6

=== Year-end championships finals ===
==== Singles: 1 (title) ====
Result	Year	Championship	Surface	Opponent	Score
Win	2016	WTA Finals, Singapore	Hard (i)	(Germany) Angelique Kerber	6–3, 6–4

== Grand Slam singles performance timeline ==
Key
W	F	SF	QF	#R	RR	Q#	DNQ	A	NH

(W) winner; (F) finalist; (SF) semifinalist; (QF) quarterfinalist; (#R) rounds 4, 3, 2, 1; (RR) round-robin stage; (Q#) qualification round; (DNQ) did not qualify; (A) absent; (NH) not held; (SR) strike rate (events won / competed); (W–L) win–loss record.

Tournament	2007	2008	2009	2010	2011	2012	2013	2014	2015	2016	2017	2018	2019	SR	W–L
Australian Open	Q1	1R	4R	1R	3R	2R	2R	F	QF	1R	3R	1R	1R	0 / 12	19–12
French Open	3R	3R	SF	3R	1R	QF	2R	3R	A	3R	2R	1R	1R	0 / 12	21–12
Wimbledon	Q1	1R	3R	3R	QF	1R	3R	3R	1R	QF	3R	QF	A	0 / 11	22–11
US Open	2R	3R	A	QF	2R	3R	1R	1R	3R	3R	2R	4R	A	0 / 11	18–11
Win–loss	3–2	4–4	10–3	8–4	7–4	7–4	4–4	10–4	6–3	8–4	6–4	7–4	0–2	0 / 46	80–46

== Records ==
Time span	Selected records	Players matched
2001–present	Won WTA Finals on debut (since inception of current round-robin format)	Serena Williams; Maria Sharapova; Petra Kvitová; Ashleigh Barty

== Controversies ==
=== Early COVID-19 Vaccination ===
In January 2021, Dominika Cibulková and her husband were vaccinated against COVID-19 at the Kramáre University Hospital despite not being part of any prioritized groups such as healthcare workers or critical infrastructure staff. They were reportedly added to the vaccination list without proper authorization. The hospital acknowledged the breach, stating the employee responsible would be barred from administering vaccinations moving forward. Prime Minister Igor Matovič called the incident a regrettable failure. Cibulková later apologized, citing misunderstanding and insisting she would not have accepted the vaccine had she known she was skipping the line.

=== Undisclosed paid promotion ===
Cibulková faced criticism for posting photos from a luxury resort on the Maldives without disclosing that the content was a paid collaboration, which falls under hidden advertising—prohibited under Slovak law. In a television interview, she admitted having an agreement with the hotel but acknowledged that she did not properly label the posts as sponsored.

== Personal life ==
Cibulková was introduced to tennis at the age of eight in Piešťany. She was eleven when her family moved to Bratislava. Her mother is the Slovak lawyer and politician Katarína Cibulková.

Her signature expression, "Pome," is the slang spelling of "Poďme", which translates to "Let's go" or "Come on" in English. With the help of her friend Marion Bartoli, she began a clothing line featuring this statement in 2014.

On 9 July 2016, Cibulková married her fiancé Michal Navara. In December 2019, not long after announcing her retirement, she announced that she was expecting her first child, who was born in June 2020. In September 2022, she announced her second pregnancy. Cibulková and Navara announced their marriage ended and they were seeking divorce in January 2026.

Awards
Preceded by (United States) Venus Williams	WTA Comeback Player of the Year; 2016	Succeeded by (United States) Sloane Stephens
